= Saeco =

Italian manufacturer

- Type: Private
- Industry: Home appliances
- Founded: Gaggio Montano, Italy, 1981; 45 years ago
- Founder: Sergio Zappella and Arthur Schmed
- Headquarters: Gaggio Montano, Italy
- Area served: Worldwide
- Products: Espresso machines
- Parent: Evoca Group, Philips

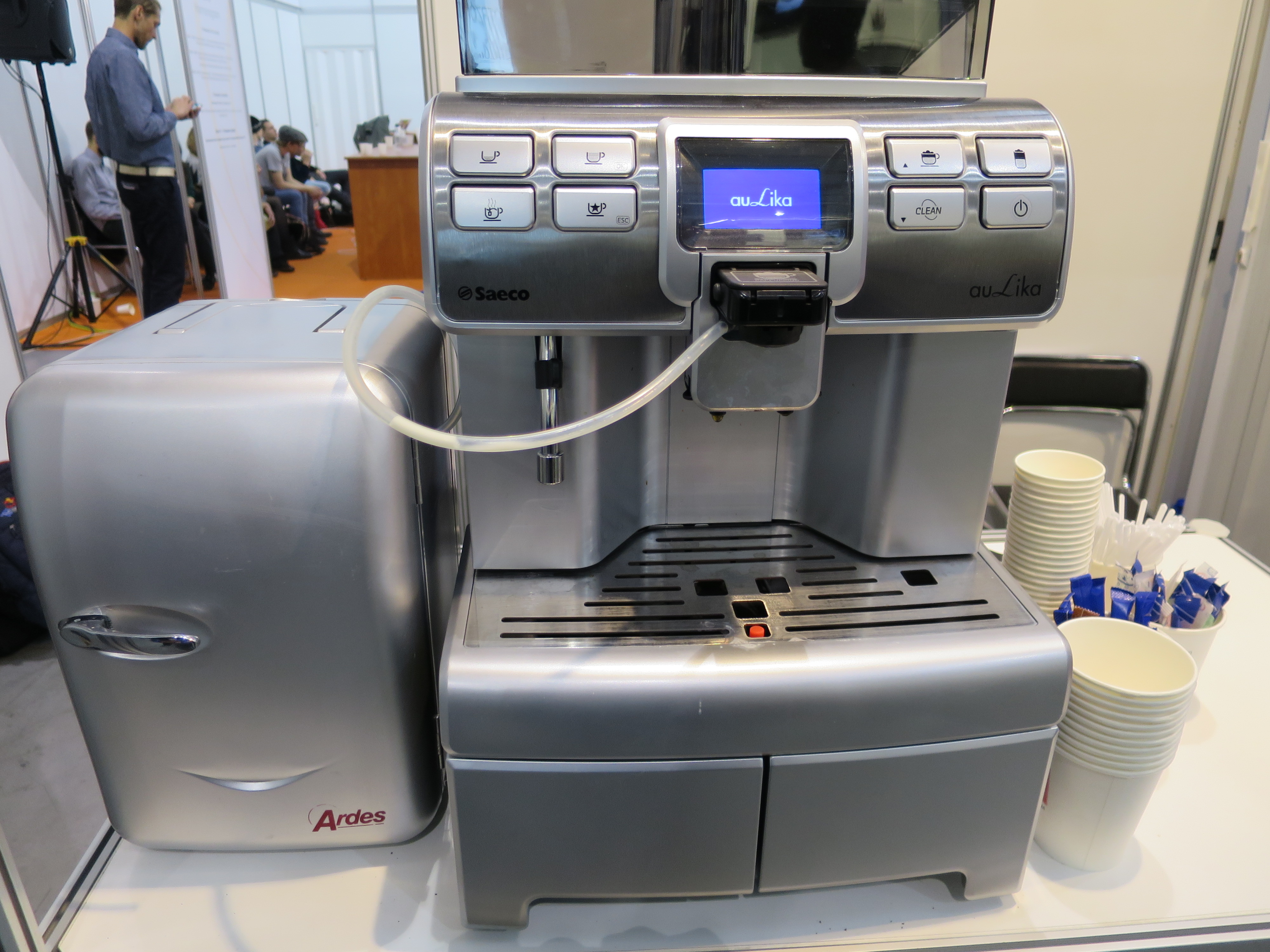
The Saeco AuLika professional machine

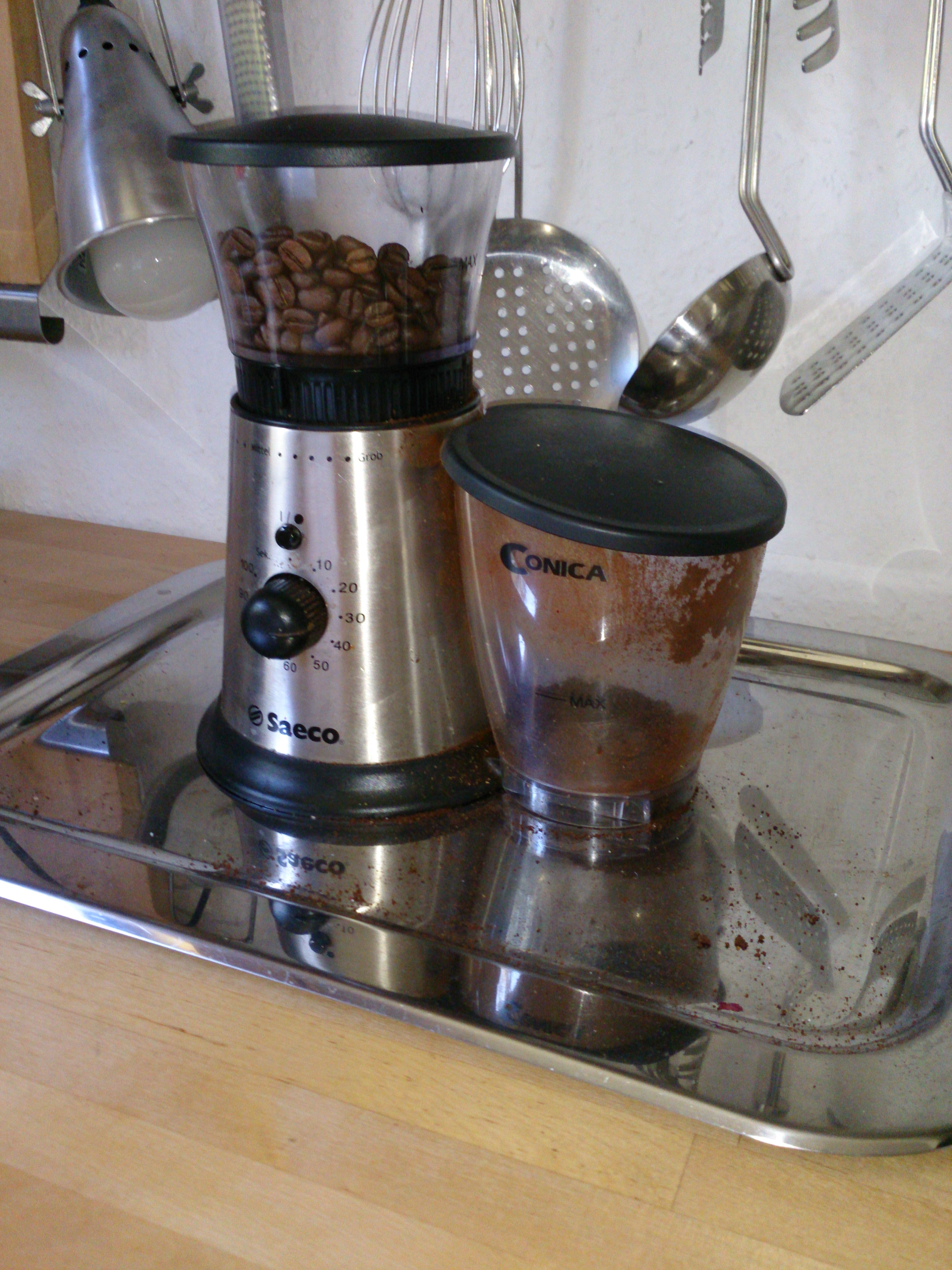
The Saeco Conica Coffee grinder - Coffeemill

Philips Saeco S.p.A., or short Saeco, is an Italian manufacturer of manual, super-automatic and capsule espresso machines and other electrical goods with headquarters and factories in Gaggio Montano near Bologna.

== History ==
The company was founded by Italian businessman Sergio Zappella and Swiss inventor Arthur Schmed in 1981 as Sergio, Arthur e Compagnia.

In 1985, they launched the first completely automatic espresso machine for domestic use, called Superautomatica and in 1999 they bought the historic espresso brand Gaggia.

In May 2009, the company board agreed to a purchase offer from Dutch manufacturer Philips, owner of the Senseo coffee system, subject to shareholder and bank approval.

Other relevant contributions to the technology used in espresso machines include the cappuccinatore (introduced in 1996) as well as the automatic brewing pressure adaptation "SBS" (1999) and most recently, the announcement of the bluetooth-enabled GranBaristo Avanti (2013).

The Saeco brand belonged to the Dutch electronics company Philips from July 2009. In 2017, Philips sold the Saeco Professional division (also with the Gaggia brand) to N&W Global Vending SpA, an Italian Bergamo based company leader in vending machines for drinks and snacks, born in 2000 from the integration of Necta and Wittenberg and controlled by a US fund, Lone Star. The production of professional coffee machines is carried out in the historical site of Gaggio Montano near Bologna. The domestic coffee machine division is now owned by Philips spinoff Versuni, itself owned by Chinese firm Hillhouse Investment. In November 2017 N&W changed its name to Evoca Group.

== See also ==
- Bialetti
- De'Longhi
- Faema
- FrancisFrancis
- Gaggia
- La Marzocco
- La Pavoni
- Lelit
- Rancilio
- List of Italian companies
