= Lelit =

Italian coffee equipment manufacturer

- Trade name: LELIT (formerly L'EL.IT) S.r.l.
- Native name: L'Elettrodomestico Italiano, Società a responsabilità limitata
- Company type: Subsidiary
- Industry: Coffee
- Founded: 1986; 40 years ago
- Founders: Maria Bellini and Edoardo Epis
- Headquarters: Baitella, Brescia, Italy
- Area served: Worldwide
- Key people: Mauro Epis (CEO)
- Products: Espresso machines, coffee products, and ironing products
- Owner: Breville Group
- Website: lelit.com

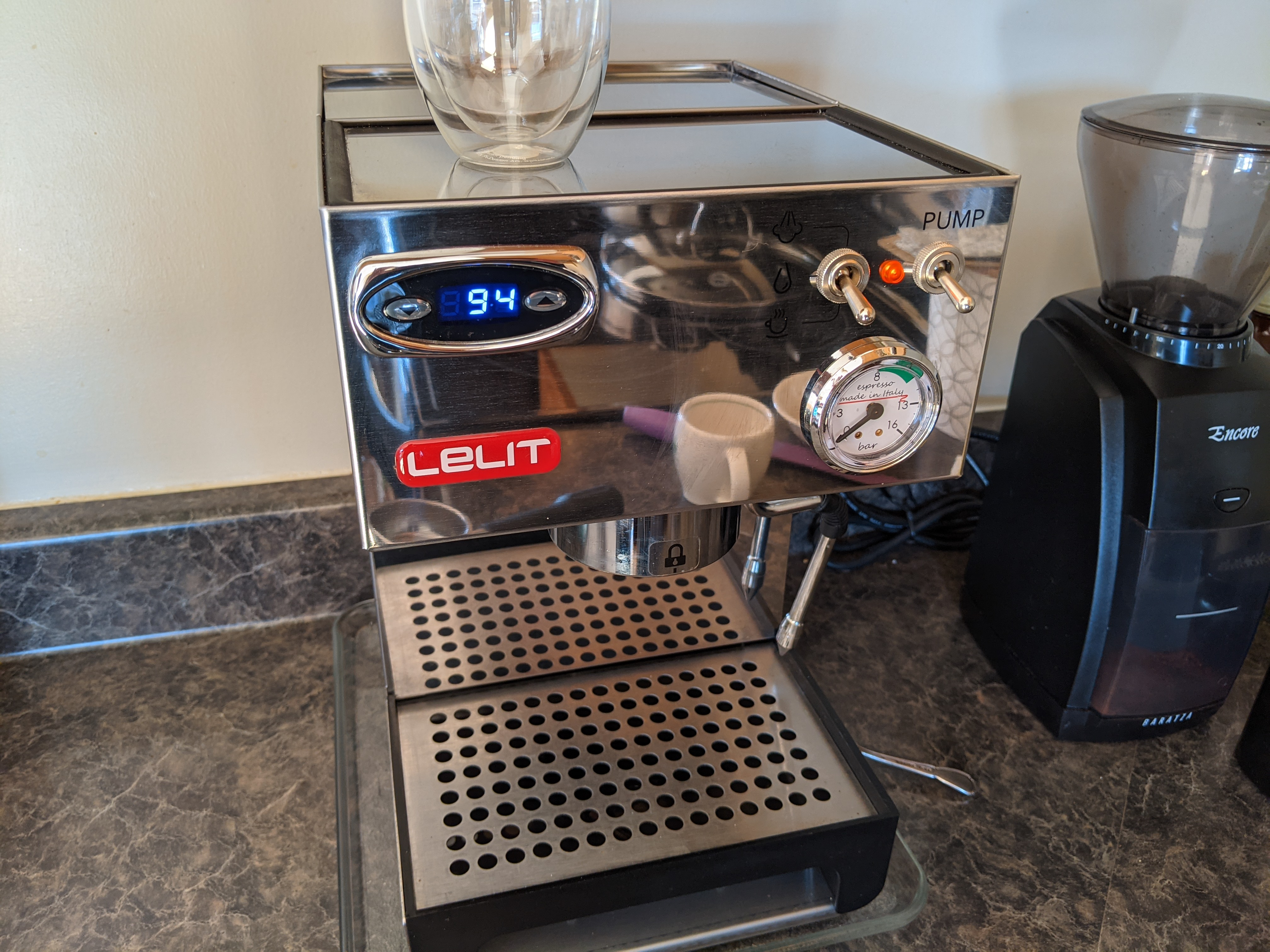
Lelit Anna espresso machine with PID controller and pressure gauge, 2021

Lelit (L'Elettrodomestico Italiano) S.r.l. is an Italian manufacturer of coffee equipment and ironing products, best known for their espresso machines. Since 2022, Lelit has operated as part of the Breville Group.

== History ==
Lelit was founded in 1986 by Maria Bellini and her husband Edoardo Epis in Baitella, Italy, near Brescia. The company initially focussed on ironing products, before expanding into coffee equipment with a focus on semi-automatic espresso machines, starting in 2002, under the management of the couple's four sons, Emanuele, Giorgio, Marco, and Mauro Epis; the latter is the current CEO of Lelit.

Lelit entered the prosumer espresso machine market in 2017 with the Lelit Bianca, adding the more compact and less expensive Lelit MaraX in 2019.

The company reported significant growth in 2020 (82% increase in revenue over 2019) and 2021 (a further 65% increase over 2020), selling 48,000 espresso machines in 2020 and nearly tripling its employees in a single month, from 80 in March to 230 in April 2020, to keep up with demand.

In 2022, Breville acquired Lelit for US$124 million (€113 million). In a statement, Breville CEO Jim Clayton said, "The acquisition of LELIT brings together the two great coffee cultures of the world: Italy and Australia... we look forward to working alongside LELIT... while preserving the values that underpin its Italian identity." The company has continued to operate as part of the Breville Group since.

As of February 2025, Women account for 74% of Lelit's workforce.

== Products ==
Lelit markets three lines of semi-automatic espresso machines: consumer single-boiler (SBDU) models with their proprietary 57mm (LELIT57) group, premium prosumer models with their 58mm E-61 derivative group (L58E), and models with a standard non-E61 58mm (LELIT58) group, which may fall into either category.

57mm group models include the Anna (PL41), Anita (PL042), and Grace (PL81, discontinued); the Anita features a built-in conical burr grinder. The current models of the Anna and Anita (PL41TEM and PL042TEMD) include PID controllers to manage brew temperature and a pressure gauge to measure brew pressure. All models in this line feature a user-adjustable overpressure valve (OPV) to control brew pressure, a 250cc brass boiler, a three-way solenoid valve, and a commercial steam wand. (Older versions of the Anna and Anita share these features, but may lack a pressure gauge or PID; some earlier models had a less effective pannarello-style steam wand.)

Standard 58mm group models include the Victoria (PL91), Kate (PL82, built-in conical burr grinder), Glenda (PL41PLUST, discontinued), and the dual-boiler Elizabeth (PL92). All models in this line (except the Elizabeth) are SBDU machines with 300cc brass boilers; the Elizabeth has a 300cc brass brew boiler and a dedicated 600cc brass steam boiler, and is consistently characterized as a prosumer machine.

Prosumer E61-derived models include the heat-exchanger MaraX (PL62X) and dual-boiler Bianca (PL162T).

Lelit also makes standalone coffee grinders, coffee accessories, and ironing products.

== Critical reception ==
James Hoffmann featured the Lelit Anna in his September 2020 "Best Espresso Machine Under £500" survey, despite "Lelit was not a brand I knew particularly well" prior to that review. He was impressed with the Anna's value and consistently sweet shots of espresso, and for being both the only machine in his survey to be set at 9 bar brew pressure from the factory and to come equipped with a pressure gauge to show that setting. The version of the Anna reviewed did not include a PID controller, and was equipped with an earlier, pannarello-style steam wand cover, an ineffectual design that Hoffmann removed prior to testing. Despite this, he found that the Anna still produced good milk texture: somewhat underpowered compared to the Rancilio Silvia (V3) and Gaggia Classic (2019), but notably superior to the Breville Bambino and Delonghi Dedica. (Later versions of the Lelit Anna have a commercial steam wand similar to the Silvia V3 and later Gaggia Classics.)

Hoffmann also included the Lelit MaraX in his June 2021 "Best Espresso Machine Under £1,500" survey, in which the MaraX was by far the least expensive machine reviewed, at just 2/3 of the maximum budget. Hoffmann praised its build quality, overall value, and compact design (the smallest footprint among those tested), noting that the machine did not compromise on user interface or experience despite packing the same features into a smaller space. He noted the Lelit MaraX's pressure gauge as the only one in that survey to give an accurate representation of brew pressure at the E61 grouphead, though he expressed frustration that the default setting for brew pressure on the adjustable OPV was higher than it should have been, and required user adjustment for optimal shots of espresso. He generally admired the MaraX's build quality, with the notable exception of its rubber feet, though he also criticised the unusual design of the spouts on the portafilter.

Asser Christensen concurred with Hoffmann about the MaraX's build quality and the persistent annoyance of the machine's feet, and expressed frustration with its thermal management, especially in maintaining consistent brew temperature, and with Lelit's documentation and customer support related to managing those thermal issues.

Lance Hedrick, conversely, described the Lelit Mara X as the 'best value heat-exchanger' machine in April 2023, and called the Lelit Elizabeth as the 'best value dual-boiler' espresso machine in May 2025, introducing the Elizabeth as "one of the best kept secrets" in espresso.

Hedrick subsequently awarded Lelit two of his three highest rankings on his June 2025 "Prosumer Espresso Machine Tier List," giving 'A' ratings to both the MaraX and Elizabeth models.

Hedrick also gave the Lelit Anna and Victoria 'B' grades in his May 2025 "Ultimate Budget Espresso Machine Tier List," describing them as strong competitors to the current Gaggia Classic Pro and Rancilio Silvia, as well as the Profitec GO and Gemilai Owl. (Just one machine was given an 'A' grade in this survey.)

== See also ==
- Bialetti
- De'Longhi
- Faema
- FrancisFrancis
- Gaggia
- La Marzocco
- La Pavoni
- Rancilio
- List of Italian companies
