= Pavoni =

Pavoni is a surname. Notable people with the surname include:

- Desiderio Pavoni, founder of La Pavoni, an Italian espresso machine manufacturer.
- José Luis Pavoni (born 1954), Argentine football coach
- Matías Pavoni (born 1980), Argentine footballer
- Pierfrancesco Pavoni, Italian athlete
- Pier Ludovico Pavoni, Italian cinematographer, director, producer, and screenwriter
- Ricardo Pavoni (born 1943), Uruguayan footballer
