= E-61 =

Class of espresso machines

Faema E-61

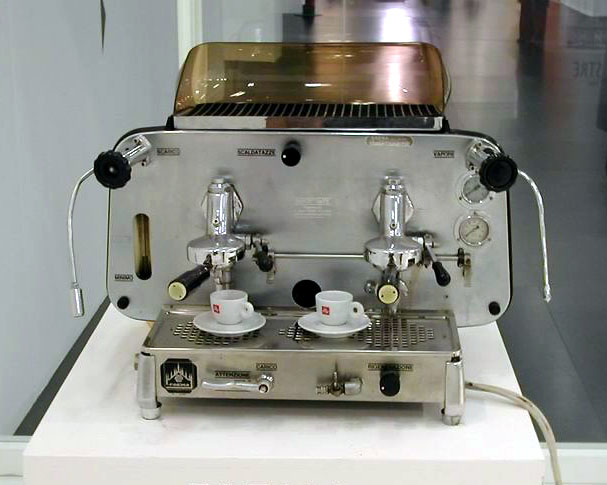
- Faema E61 (1961)
- Type: Espresso machine brew group
- Inventor: Ernesto Valente
- Inception: 1961; 65 years ago
- Manufacturer: Faema
- Available: Yes (as E61 Legend)
- Website: faema.com/uk-en/product/E61

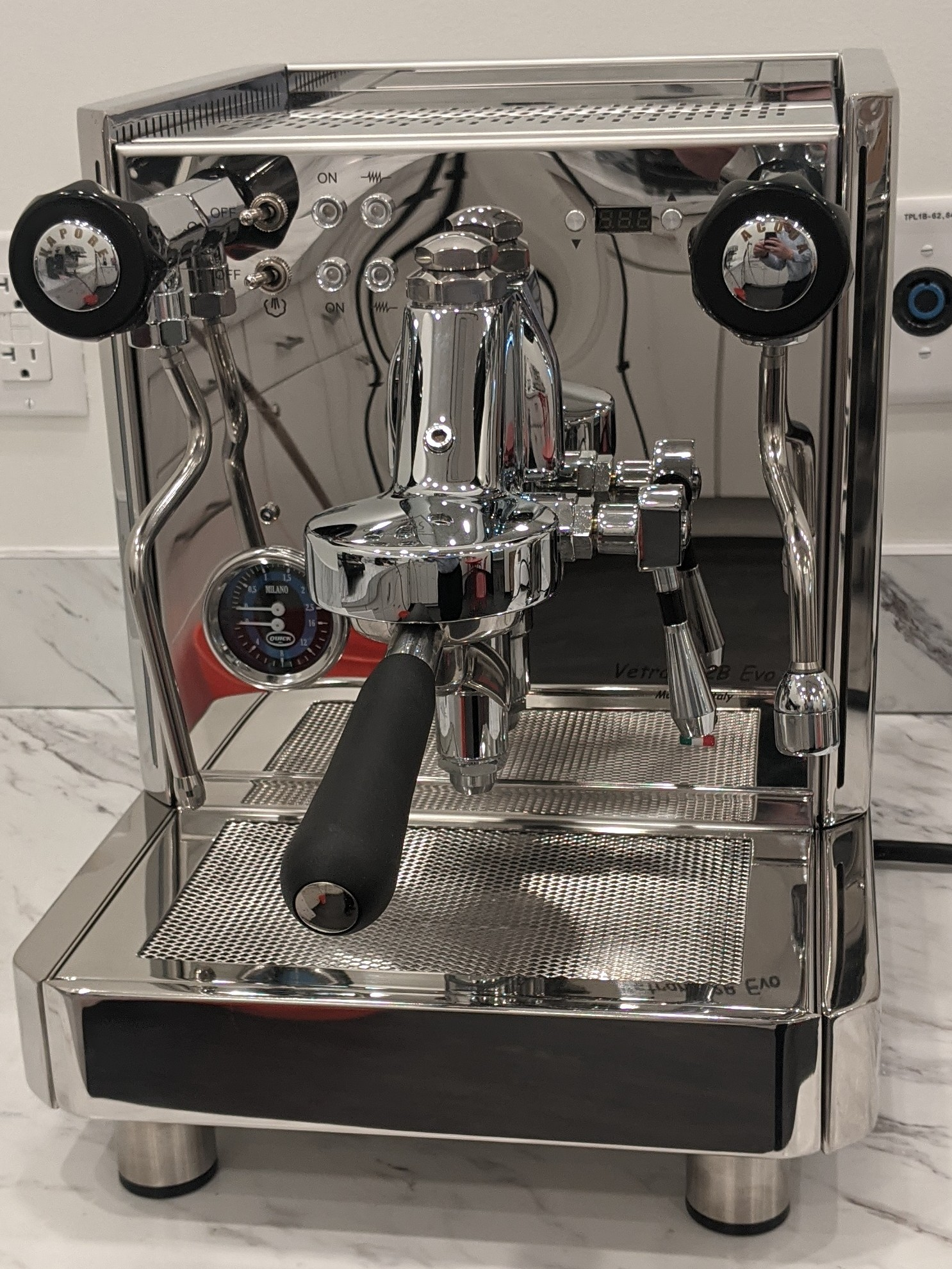
Vetrano 2B Evo espresso machine with E61 group (2020)

E61 machine brewing espresso (2014)

External videos
- Animation: mechanics of the E61
- Internals of an E61 Brew Head
- How it Works: Cutaway Espresso Machine with E61 Brew Group
- Skeletal E61-style machine
- How It Works: E61-style Deep Dive

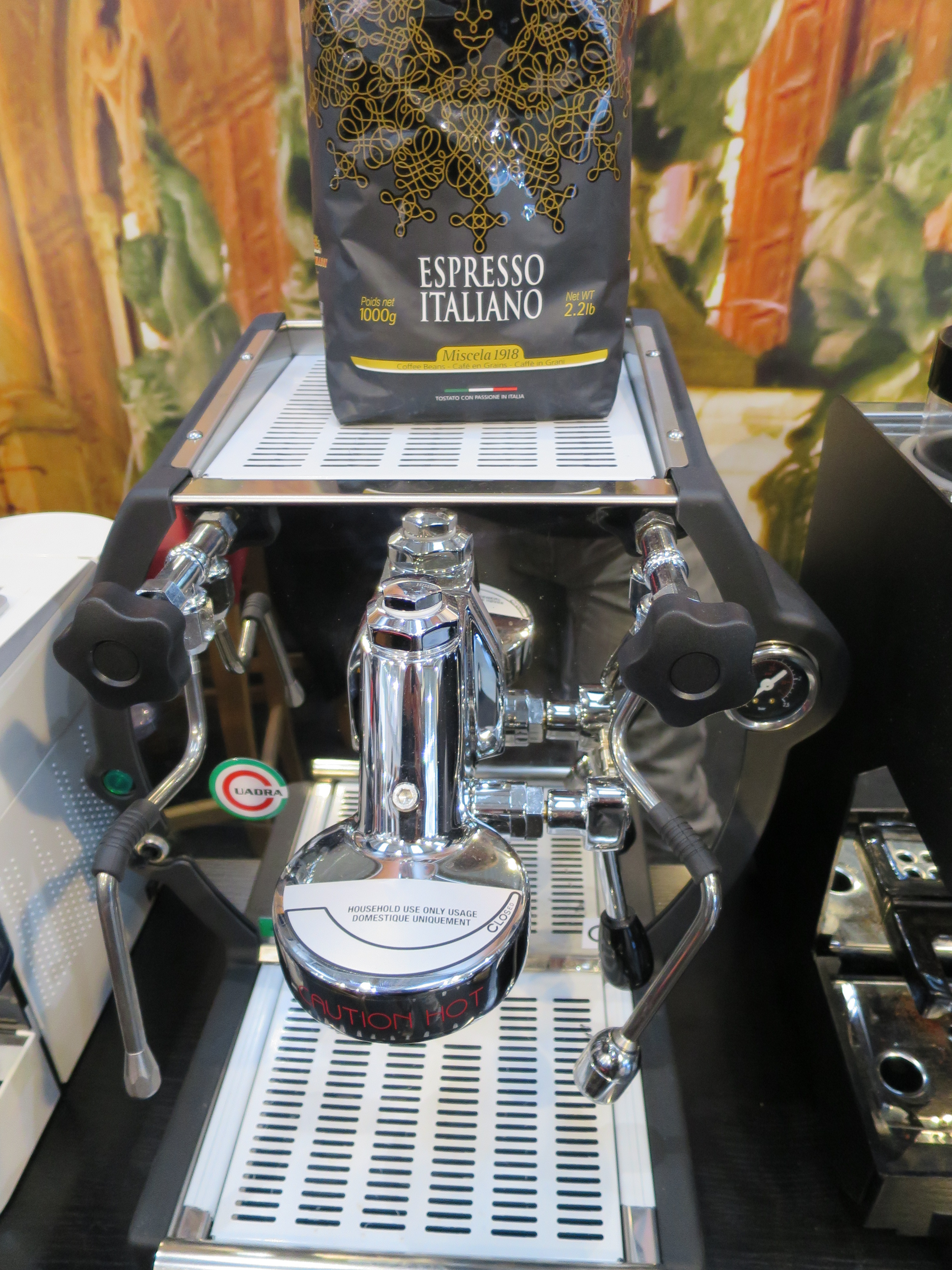
Elevated view of La Nuova Era Cuadra espresso machine with E61 group (2015)

E-61 (commonly E61) is a type of espresso machine brew group, invented and patented by Ernesto Valente and introduced by Faema in 1961.

The term E61 comes from the Faema espresso machine of the same name, which introduced the technology, and was in turn named for the solar eclipse in its year of introduction. It is also used as a genericized trademark for machines using brew groups of this type. The E61 is regarded as "revolutionary" in espresso, and one of "the most influential coffee machines of history."

== History ==
Prior to the introduction of the E61, the Gaggia spring-lever design, patented by Achille Gaggia in 1947, was predominant among espresso machines. This design requires the user (e.g. a barista) to pull a lever to tension a spring, which then drives a piston to pressurize heated brew water to the approximately 9 bars of pressure required to produce espresso, and afforded the user a considerable degree of manual control over the process.

Ernesto Valente's company Faema had been the original manufacturer of Gaggia's 1948 machine, but their collaboration ended after disagreement over the market for espresso machines. Where Gaggia saw them as niche, high-end appliances for specialized operators in commercial establishments that could afford them, Valente saw opportunity in a larger market for inexpensive, automated machines.

In 1960, Valente filed a patent in Italy (subsequently filed and granted in the United States) describing an espresso machine group with "alternately seating valves". This valve system within the group head allowed the machine to automatically saturate the ground coffee in the filter basket with brew temperature water at the much lower pressure in the boiler, prior to applying higher, pump-driven pressure (9 bar) brew water to the puck of coffee to produce espresso. As Valente discusses in his patent, this pre-infusion phase (which Valente calls "preparation of infusion") is a notable feature of Gaggia's spring-lever design, as well as direct lever espresso machines without a spring-driven piston (e.g. La Pavoni Europiccola), and crucial to the preparation of good espresso.

Valente's group allowed the Faema E61 to become the first espresso machine to use automatic pre-infusion, the first to incorporate an electric pump, and the first to incorporate a thermosiphon for managing the temperature of the group head. The combination of the thermosiphon and the mass of brass in the E61 group head, in excess of 4 kilograms (8.8 lb), gives E61 machines desirable thermal inertia in operation, maintaining a stable brew temperature while pulling shots of espresso in succession. In the E61 machine, operation was substantially automated, using an on-off switch to control an electric pump. It entered the market at a time when much of Italy gained electricity for the first time. Water was drawn directly from the plumbing, pressurized to 9 bars (900 kPa), and sent through a copper pipe inside a boiler. As it travelled, the water was maintained at a temperature considered by the manufacturers to be ideal for brewing. For the barista, there was no longer a need to pause between espressos as the boiler came back to temperature. In addition, the use of a horizontal boiler orientation lowered the top of the machine, allowing eye-level conversation with customers waiting for coffee.

The patent on the E61 group expired in 1996; the design is now in the public domain.

Beyond Faema, E61 groups have been used on espresso machines made by Bezzera (Aria, DUO), Profitec (700 series, Drive, Ride), ECM (Classika, Synchonika, Mechanika, Puristika), Rocket Espresso (Appartamento, Giotto, Mozzafiato), La Nuova Era (Cuadra, Altea), Sanremo, Vetrano, Expobar, Lelit (Bianca, MaraX), and La Pavoni (Cellini), among others.
