= Faema (cycling team) =

Cycling teams with the name Faema, sponsored by Faema, include:

- Faema (cycling team, 1955–1962), known as Faema from 1955 to 1962
- Flandria (cycling team), known as Flandria–Faema in 1963
- Faemino–Faema, known as Faema in 1968 and 1969
