= Luigi Bezzera =

Inventor of the first removable portafilter espresso machine

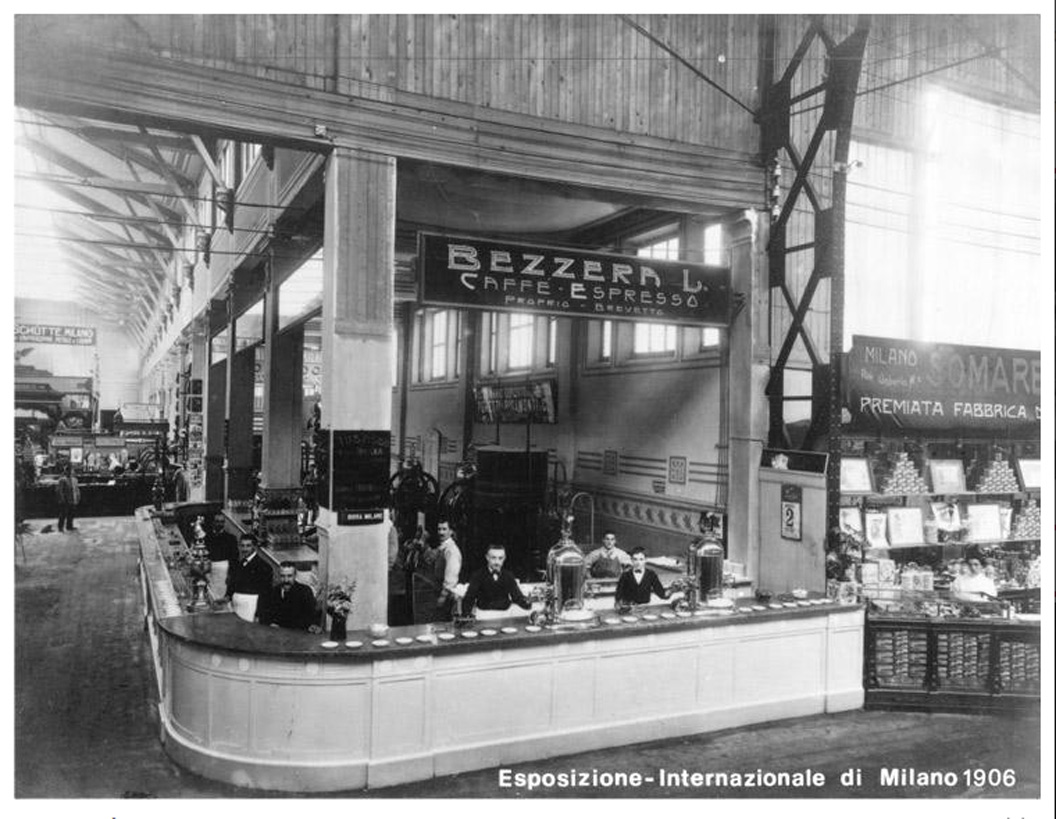
- Born: 19th century
- Died: 20th century Italy
- Occupation: Mechanic
- Known for: Inventor of the removable portafilter espresso coffee machine

Signature
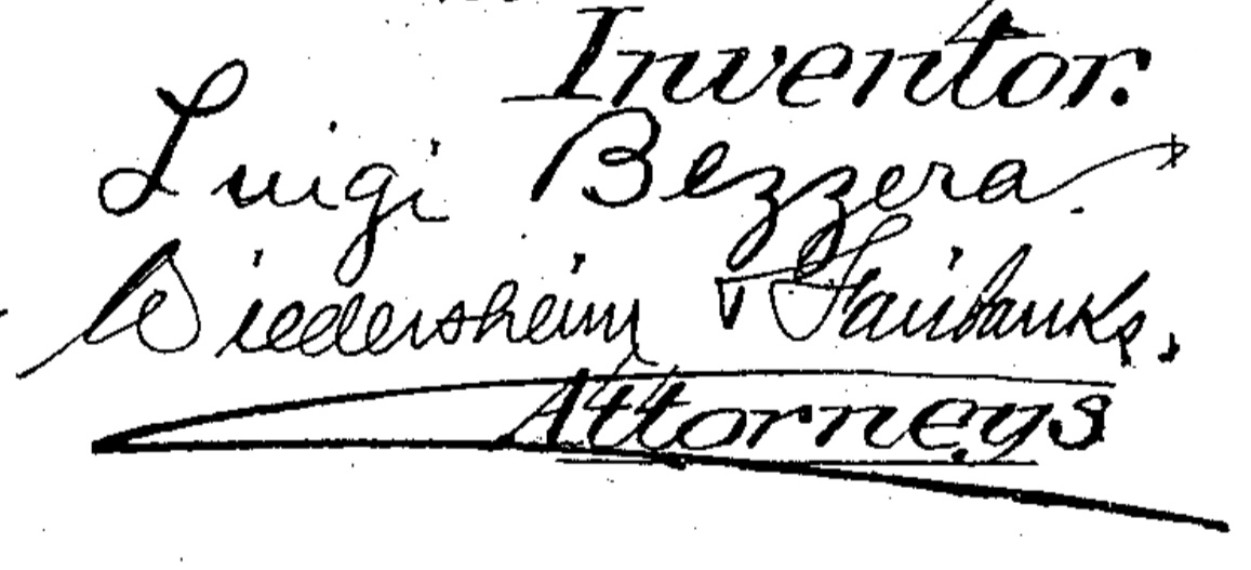

Luigi Bezzera (born in the 19th century; died in the 20th century) was an Italian mechanic and innovator. He is the inventor of the first removable portafilter espresso machine, while Angelo Moriondo holds the first recorded patent for the espresso machine, he hired a mechanic in Milan to build it. Some believe that mechanic to be Luigi Bezzera.

== Career ==
Although the original patent for the rapid extraction of coffee with steam and hot water was granted to Angelo Moriondo on 16 May 1884, the method was not initially practical, and machines on this basis were found only in the immediate vicinity of Turin. Bezzera improved this concept and applied for a patent for his innovations on 19 December 1901. These improvements enabled machines with significantly increased throughput and cost-effectiveness. This was crucial for the concept's subsequent success. Bezzera's patent (153/94, 61707) was acquired by Desiderio Pavoni, who founded the company La Pavoni in 1905 .

Pavoni initially kept the old name and began working with Bezzera on mass production in a workshop in Via Parini in Milan. Bezzera had neglected this aspect. In 1906, the espresso machine was exhibited under the name Bezzera L. Caffè Espresso at the World's Fair in Milan.

The term espresso for coffee prepared in this way was used for the first time on this occasion.

Pavoni soon promoted the machine as the "ideal" coffee machine and marketed it under the commercial name Ideale for La Pavoni. Subsequently, Bezzera and Pavoni built independent companies.

The Bezzera company is now run by Luigi Bezzera's great-grandson Luca Bezzera.

The name Bezzera comes from Portuguese and is pronounced in Italy with emphasis on the first syllable.
