= Breville Group =

Australian multinational home appliances manufacturer

Breville Group Limited
- Type: Public
- Traded as: ASX: BRG; S&P/ASX 200 component
- Industry: Home appliances
- Founded: January 11, 1932; 94 years ago
- Headquarters: Alexandria, New South Wales, Australia
- Area served: Worldwide
- Key people: Jim Clayton (CEO)
- Revenue: ▲ A$1.48 billion (2023)
- Operating income: ▲ A$172.02 million (2023)
- Net income: ▲ A$110.21 million (2023)
- Total assets: ▲ A$1.37 billion (2023)
- Total equity: ▲ A$769.66 million (2023)
- Website: brevillegroup.com

Breville Group Limited, or simply Breville, is an Australian multinational manufacturer and marketer of home appliances, headquartered in Alexandria, New South Wales, Australia. The company's brands include Breville, Sage, Kambrook, Baratza, and Lelit. Breville markets its products worldwide using its namesake Breville brand, except in Europe, where the Sage brand is used. Breville is best known for its home appliances.

== History ==
=== Breville ===
The company was established in 1932, by Bill O’Brien and Harry Norville, who combined their two surnames to form the company name. The company originally manufactured radios. During World War II, it made mine detectors. By 1953, the radio business had been taken over by A.W. Jackson Industries Pty. Ltd., which manufactured radiograms and, later, television sets under the Breville brand. In the 1960s, Breville turned its attention to manufacturing kitchen appliances.

The O'Brien family continued developing the Breville business for three generations. In 1974, Breville released the toasted sandwich maker, making the Breville brand a household name in Australia. Soon after this, the Breville toasted sandwich maker was launched in New Zealand and the United Kingdom, where it was met with similar success.

Breville has been listed on the Australian Securities Exchange since 1999.

=== Housewares International Limited ===
The company was founded in 1957 as Housewares International Limited, and imported homeware products. In 2001, Housewares International bought the Breville companies in Australia, New Zealand and Hong Kong.

=== Breville Group Limited ===
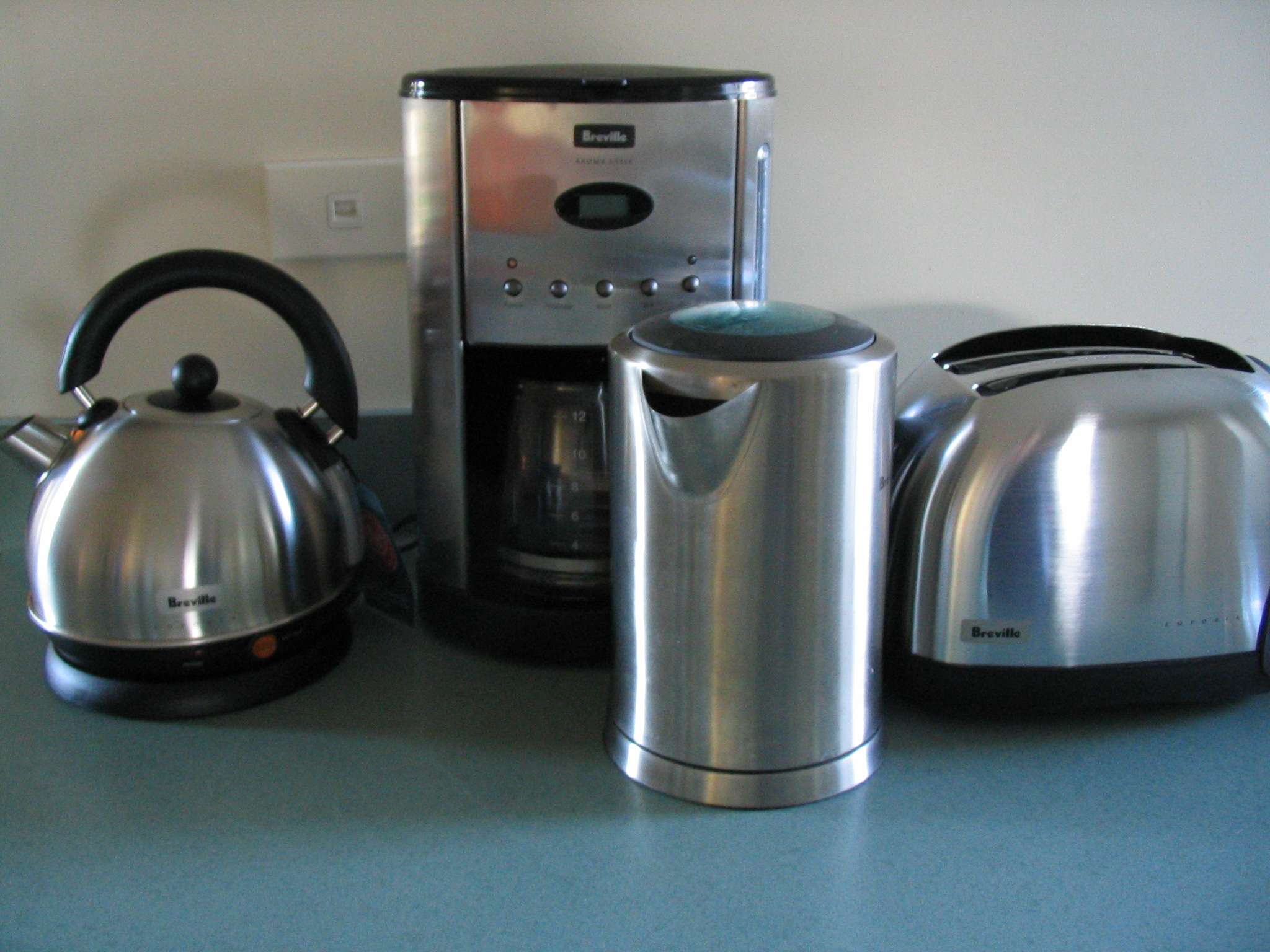
An assortment of Breville appliances

In 2008, Housewares International Limited officially changed its name to the Breville Group Limited. The Breville Group Limited also owns the Kambrook and Sage brands. It markets most of its product under the Sage brand in the UK and Europe, since the Breville brand is owned by the unrelated Newell Brands company in the UK.
