= Fabio De'Longhi =

Italian businessman

- Born: 1967 (age 58–59)
- Education: Bocconi University
- Parent: Giuseppe De'Longhi

Fabio De'Longhi (born 1967) is an Italian businessman and former CEO and general manager of De'Longhi.

== Early life ==
He was born in 1967, and is the son of Giuseppe De'Longhi. He studied economics at Bocconi University.

== Career ==
He became CEO of De'Longhi in June 2005. The De'Longhi family owns 67% of the shares.

In May 2020 he resigned as CEO and general manager, and handed over to Massimo Garavaglia. In September 2022, he became CEO once again.
