= Giuseppe De'Longhi =

Italian billionaire businessman

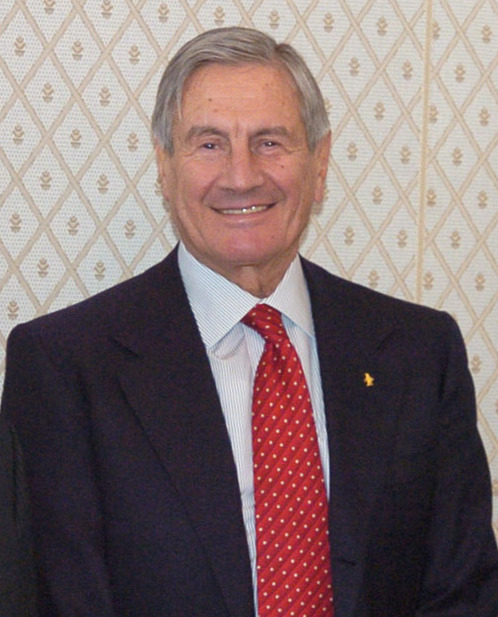
- De'Longhi in 2006
- Born: 24 April 1939 (age 86); Treviso, Italy
- Education: Ca' Foscari University of Venice
- Occupation(s): President, De'Longhi
- Spouse: Divorced
- Children: 2, including Fabio De'Longhi

Giuseppe De'Longhi (born 24 April 1939) is an Italian billionaire businessman, and the president of De'Longhi.

== Early life ==
He was born in Treviso, Italy, on 24 April 1939.

He graduated from Ca' Foscari University of Venice.

== Career ==
As of July 2024, he had a net worth estimated by Forbes at US$4.7 billion.

== Personal life ==
He is divorced, with two children, and lives in Treviso, Italy. His son, Fabio De'Longhi, is CEO of De'Longhi.
