= De' Longhi =

Italian small appliance manufacturer

De'Longhi S.p.A.
- Type: Public
- Traded as: BIT: DLG; FTSE Italia Mid Cap
- Industry: Home appliances
- Founded: 1902; 124 years ago
- Headquarters: Treviso, Italy
- Area served: Worldwide
- Key people: Giuseppe De'Longhi; Fabio De'Longhi (chairman and CEO)
- Products: Heaters, air conditioners, vacuum cleaners, espresso machines, kitchen appliances and small appliances
- Revenue: €2351.3 million (2020)
- Number of employees: 9000 (2020)
- Website: www.delonghigroup.com

De'Longhi S.p.A. (Italian pronunciation: [deˈloŋɡi]; stylized as DēLonghi) is an Italian small appliance manufacturer based in Treviso, Italy.

== History and trading ==
The company was founded by the De'Longhi family in 1902 as a small industrial parts manufacturing workshop. The company incorporated in 1950. Historically a major producer of portable heaters and air conditioners, the company has expanded to include nearly every category of small domestic appliances in the food preparation and cooking, as well as household cleaning and ironing, segments.

== Products ==
De'Longhi is especially well known for the Artista Series espresso machines, the De'Longhi gelato maker as well as the Pinguino portable air conditioner.

De'Longhi is known for the design of its products. Its Esclusivo line of kitchen appliances won the Red Dot design award in 2007. Home Furnishing News recognized the firm's Design Director Giacomo Borin as one of the 50 most influential designers in the world in 2006.

De'Longhi's 2000 acquisition of Climaveneta S.p.A. and DLRadiators allowed De'Longhi to enter the commercial HVACR (heating, ventilation, air conditioning and refrigeration) market.

== Merger and acquisitions ==
Its acquisition of the British appliance maker Kenwood for £45.9 million (about $66.7 million) in 2001 gave it access to Kenwood's Chinese factory. As a result, many of De'Longhi's products are now imported from China, while design and engineering remain largely in Italy.

Acquisition of a majority stake in RC Group, a leading player in datacenter cooling, in 2006 has strengthened its presence in the HVACR market.

In all, the company operates 13 production facilities and 30 international subsidiaries that support sales to 75 countries worldwide. International sales account for nearly 75 percent of the group's total revenues, which topped €1.63 billion in 2010.

In January 2012 the DeLclima group was set up as a demerger from De'Longhi.

In April 2012, De'Longhi bought perpetual rights to manufacture Braun branded products from Procter & Gamble in the small appliance segment. Procter & Gamble will continue to own the Braun brand. €50 million was paid immediately and €90 million will be paid over the next 15 years.

In 2017, De'Longhi acquired a 40% stake in Eversys Group, a Swiss espresso machine manufacturer. In 2021, De'Longhi acquired the remaining 60%, taking full ownership.

In 2018, India-based Orient Electric partnered with De'Longhi to market small kitchen appliances in India.

In November 2020, De'Longhi announced the acquisition of Capital Brands, which specialized in mixers, for 420 million euros.

== Public trading ==
Shares in the company are traded on Milan's stock exchange under the ticker symbol DLG. Revenues have steadily increased to nearly double the revenue from 2014. In 2022, revenue was €3,160,000,000.

In October 2017, the Asthma and Allergy Foundation of America and Allergy Standards Limited announced that five De'Longhi dehumidifiers have earned the Asthma and Allergy Friendly Certification. These are the first dehumidifiers to receive the program's mark.

== Controversies ==
De'Longhi faced criticism for continuing its operations in Russia following the country's invasion of Ukraine in 2022. Although the company paused new investments and development in March 2022, it maintained its existing operations, including a production plant in Tatarstan. Reports indicated that household appliances from De'Longhi, initially produced for the Ukrainian market, were redirected to Russia and sold through marketplaces and electronics store chains. Additionally, De'Longhi's Russian website remained active, job vacancies were posted for positions in Russia, and advertisements continued on platforms like YouTube, leading to further scrutiny over the company's ongoing business activities in the region.

== See also ==
- Bialetti
- Faema
- FrancisFrancis
- Gaggia
- La Marzocco
- La Pavoni
- Rancilio
- Saeco
