= Bialetti =

Italian cookware manufacturer

- Current owner: Bialetti Industries
- Country: Italy
- Introduced: 1933
- Markets: Moka Express; Cookware; Kitchenware
- Previous owners: Alfonso Bialetti
- Website: bialetti.com

Bialetti is an Italian brand of coffee machines, cookware, and small kitchen appliances founded by Alfonso Bialetti. Its best-known product is the moka pot line of stovetop coffeemakers.

== History ==
Alfonso Bialetti first acquired his metal-working skills by working for a decade in the French aluminium industry. By 1919, he had established his own metal and machine workshop in Crusinallo (in his native Piedmont) to make aluminium products: this was the foundation of the Bialetti company. He transformed his workshop – Alfonso Bialetti & C. Fonderia in Conchiglia – into a studio for design and production. In 1933, Bialetti founded the brand and invented moka pots. The company was later operated by his son Renato Bialetti.

After a period of crisis in the 1970s and 1980s, Bialetti merged with Rondine Italia in 1993 and founded a new company named Bialetti Industrie S.p.A., based in Brescia.

Francesco Ranzoni acts as both President and CEO of the company.

At the end of 2015, the company's income statement registered a total revenue of €172.4 million, 6.9% more than 2014 (€161.2 million).

In 2010, a study calculated that 90% of Italian families own a moka pot made by Bialetti.

In April 2025 Nuo Capital, a Luxembourg-based fund controlled by Stephen Cheng, has signed an agreement to purchase 78.567% of Bialetti's shares.

== See also ==
- De'Longhi
- Faema
- FrancisFrancis
- Gaggia
- La Marzocco
- La Pavoni
- Lelit
- Rancilio
- Saeco
- List of Italian companies
