= La Marzocco =

Italian espresso machine manufacturer

Coordinates: 43.9625048°N 11.351572°E

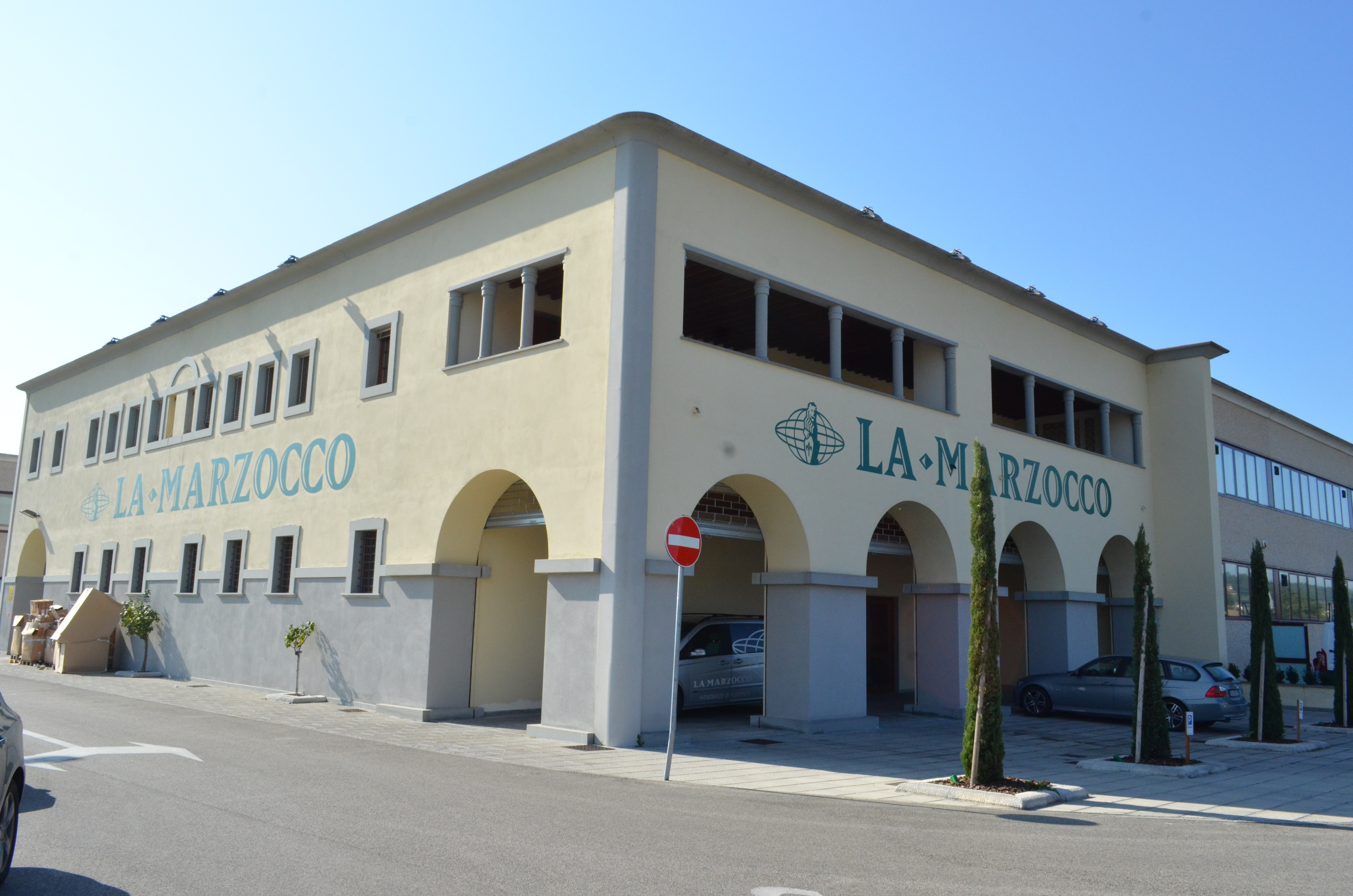
- La Marzocco's headquarters (2012)
- Company type: Subsidiary
- Industry: Domestic & Professional espresso machines
- Founded: Florence, Italy, 1927; 99 years ago
- Founders: Giuseppe Bambi; Bruno Bambi
- Headquarters: Scarperia e San Piero, Italy
- Area served: Worldwide
- Key people: Giuseppe Bambi; Bruno Bambi; Pierro Bambi; Giovanna Bambi; Kent Bakke; Bill Crossland
- Products: Espresso machines
- Number of employees: 800
- Parent: De'Longhi SpA
- Website: www.lamarzocco.com

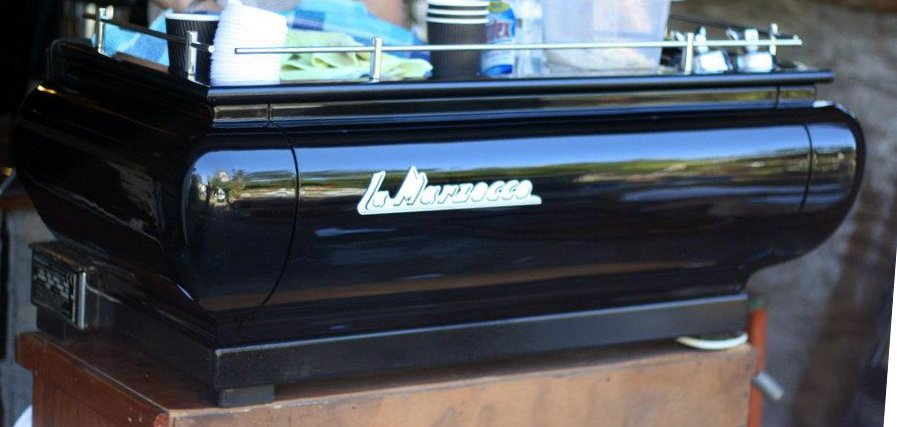
La Marzocco FB/70 espresso machine

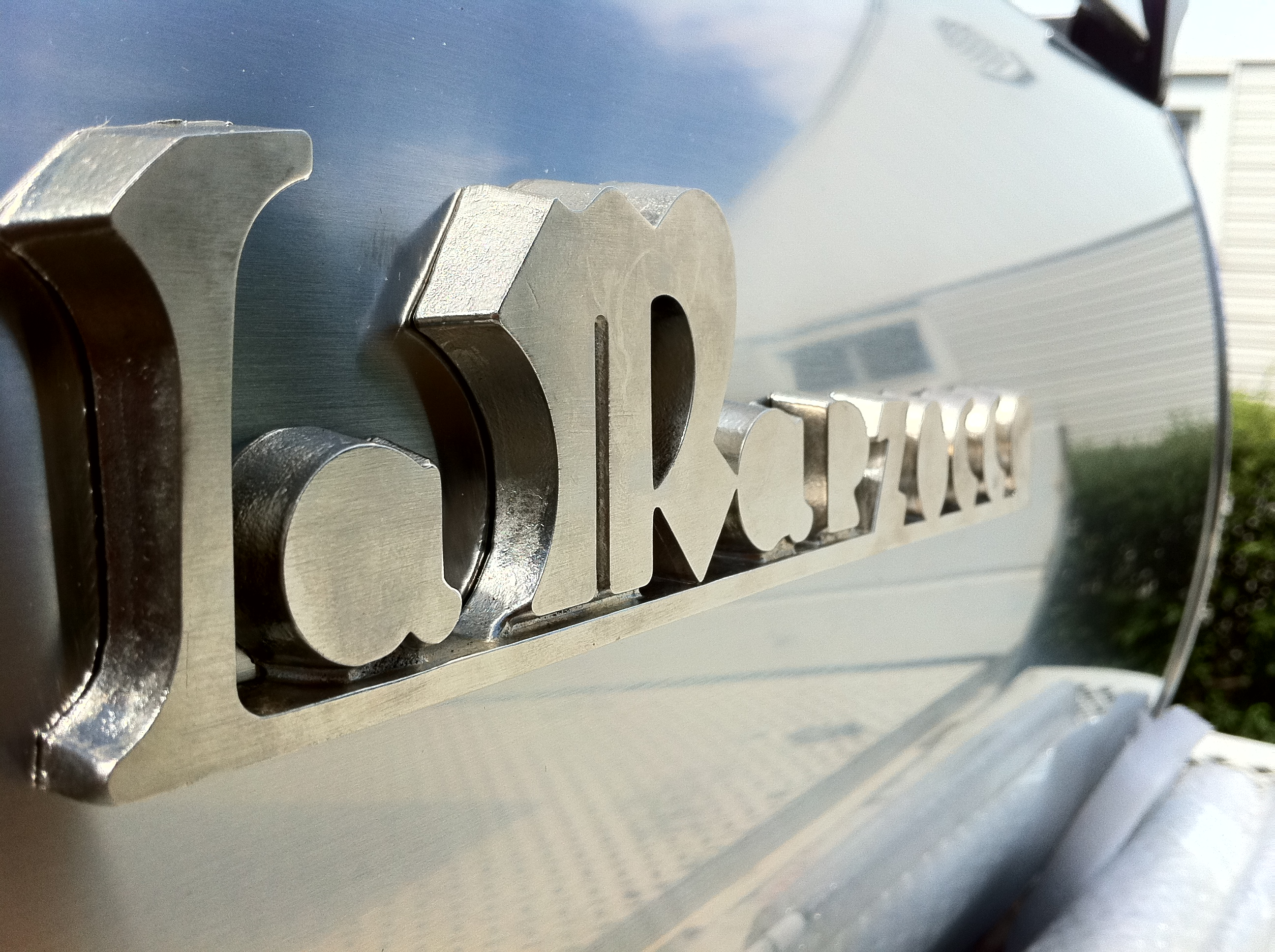
La Marzocco GB/5 espresso machine

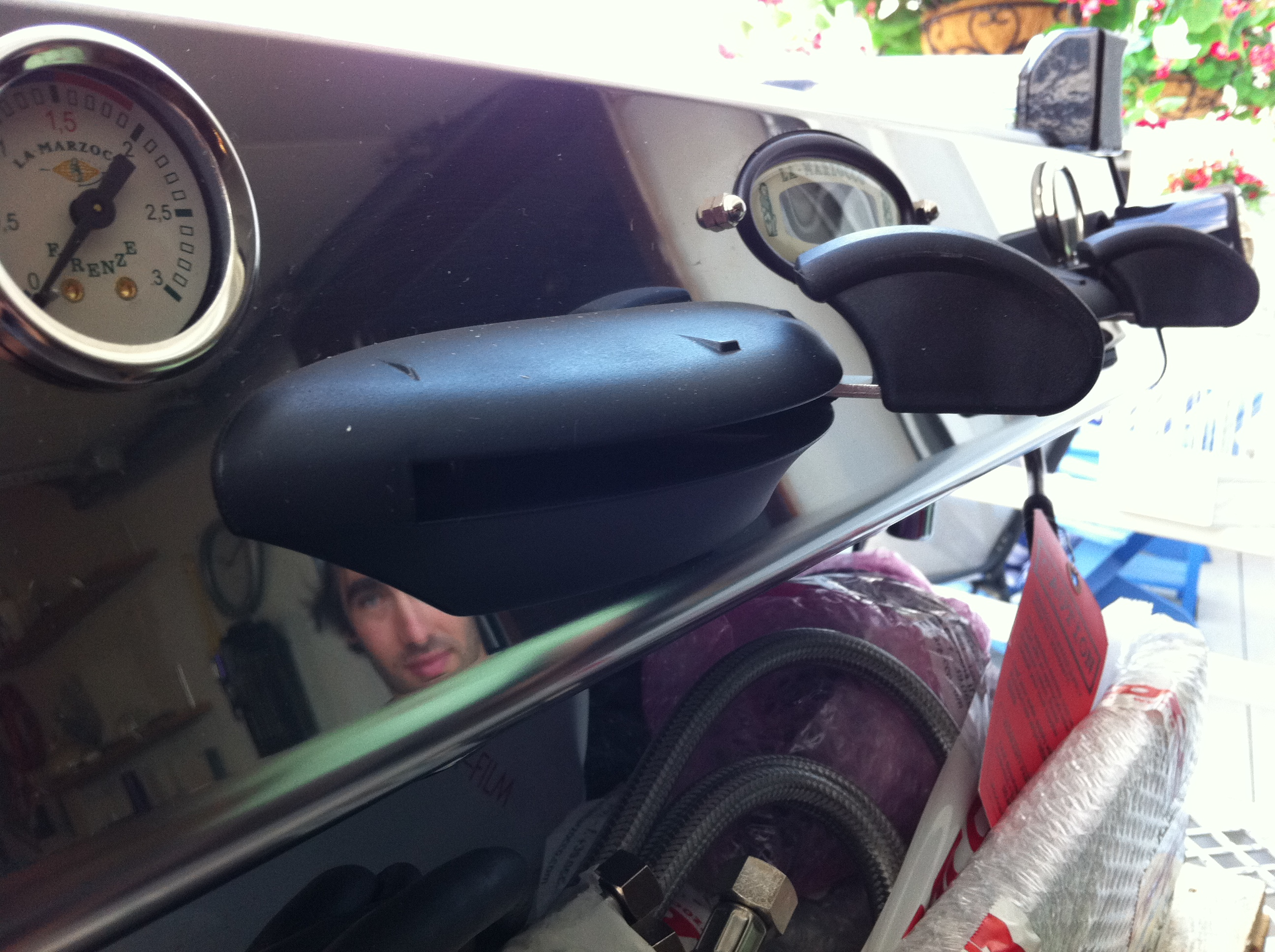
Paddle-style grouphead controls on La Marzocco GB-5

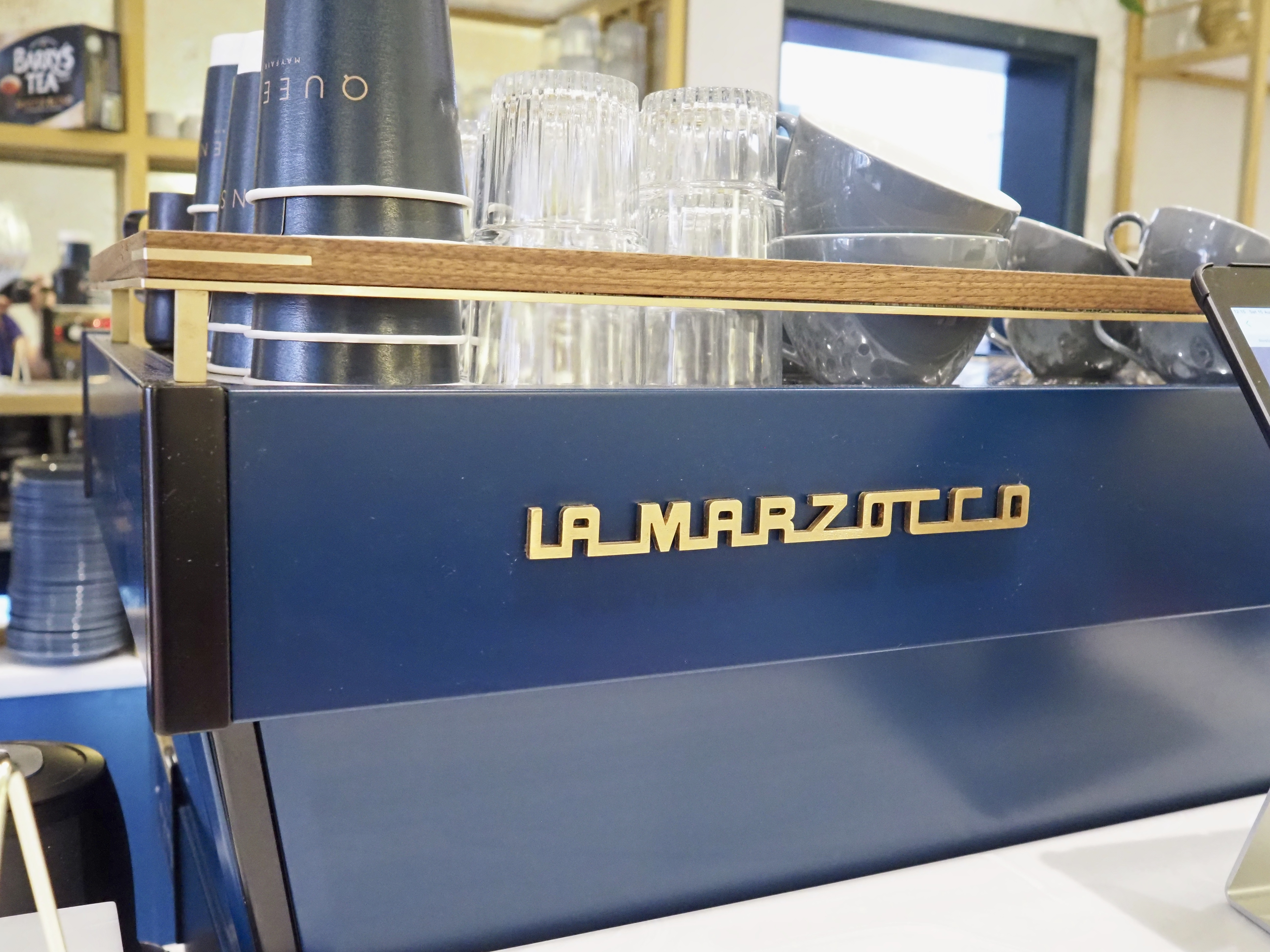
La Marzocco machine serving on the bar at Queens of Mayfair (2020)

La Marzocco, founded in 1927 in Florence by Giuseppe and Bruno Bambi, is an Italian company specializing in high-end espresso machines. It is now based in Scarperia, with branch offices worldwide.

== History ==
After the Bambi brothers manufactured their first coffee machine, Fiorenza, on commission, they established their own business in 1927 specialized in hand-crafting espresso machines, and named it after the Marzocco – the city of Florence's symbol of victory and conquest.

As coffee consumption grew in Italy throughout the 20th century, La Marzocco introduced several technical innovations to its espresso machine designs. In 1939, La Marzocco was the first to register a patent for an espresso machine with a horizontal boiler. The horizontal design organized the brew groups in a row, which improved efficiency for the barista and allowed greater interaction with customers.

Following the introduction of the lever machines by Gaggia in 1947, La Marzocco began to manufacture its own lever models. In the early 1950s, Piero Bambi joined the business of his father Giuseppe and his uncle.

From 1964 to 1970 La Marzocco produced the Poker series, in which the piston, unlike lever machines, was lifted and pressed during brewing by means of a diaphragm, that was inflated by steam pressure generated by the boiler. In this period, Giuseppe Bambi's Vulcano grinder was awarded the Decorative and Industrial Arts Prize at the 14th Triennale di Milano exhibition in 1968.

In 1970, La Marzocco patented its first series of professional semi-automatic, dual-boiler machines named GS (Gruppo Saturo, saturated group), winning the Qualità e Cortesia-Toscana prize in 1971. The two independent boilers separated coffee extraction from steam production thus, together with the saturated groups, ensured thermal stability and improved coffee quality in the cup since water now flowed through independent circuits. From the 1970s onward all La Marzocco boilers are manufactured in stainless steel. Their redesigned GS model, the GS/2, won the Premio Andino de Fomento prize in 1982.

By 1990, Piero Bambi had designed his first machine in its entirety, the Linea (later known as the Linea Classic).

The FB/70 coffee machine (FB for Fratelli Bambi) is launched to celebrate La Marzocco's 70th anniversary in 1997. This is a version of La Marzocco Linea models with a unique fiberglass body.

La Marzocco's Swift grinder was awarded Best New Product at the 2000 San Francisco SCAA conference, the first patented model to combine dosing, grinding and automatic tamping technologies.

In 2001, La Marzocco began an eight-year sponsorship of the World Barista Championship, serving as the official espresso machine supplier from 2001 to 2008.

The GB/5 machine (named after Piero's wife, Giovanna Bambi) is introduced, equipped with a CPU board and improved thermo-stability in light of the introduction of "PID" technology.

In anticipation of the company's 80th anniversary in 2007, the FB/80 was manufactured for the 2006 World Barista Championship in Bern. The following year, La Marzocco introduced the GS/3 model, and also launched the "Songwa Estate Project", a non-profit joint venture aiming to provide educational experiences for members of the specialty coffee industry.

In April 2009, the company presented its pressure profile technology at SCAA on a prototype, which, for the first time, enabled the barista to have direct pressure control at any point during extraction. Soon after, its branch in the USA is established, the Italian factory is relocated to nearby Scarperia, with a showroom and training center, and La Marzocco's first "Out of The Box" event is inaugurated in Milan. The redesigned Vulcano grinder, with Mazzer grinder technology, is introduced on this occasion, and the pressure profile technology introduced earlier in the year is built into the newly designed Strada EP (electronical paddle). The Strada MP (mechanical paddle) is on display as well.

The Linea PB, named after the machine's designer, Piero Bambi, is introduced at the 2013 Boston SCAA conference. The Linea PB refashions the Linea Classic with a new proprietary software platform which controls brewing time and volume. The Vulcano Swift grinder is introduced as well and incorporates the Swift technology with the design of the Vulcano. The Strada EE (semi-automatic) is introduced in January 2014.

In 2015, La Marzocco also released the Linea Mini, a home espresso machine derived from the commercial Linea Classic, featuring a dual boiler and app connectivity. It received the Best New Product and People's Choice awards at the 2015 SCAA conference in Seattle. The company also introduced the prototype of its Strada AV machine, which was subsequently launched in 2016.

In November 2022, the company released a new espresso machine called the La Marzocco Linea Micra, a smaller version of Linea Mini. In October 2024, they launched a limited-edition version of the Linea Micra in collaboration with Porsche, called the La Marzocco X Porsche, incorporating elements of Porsche's automotive design.

== La Marzocco International ==
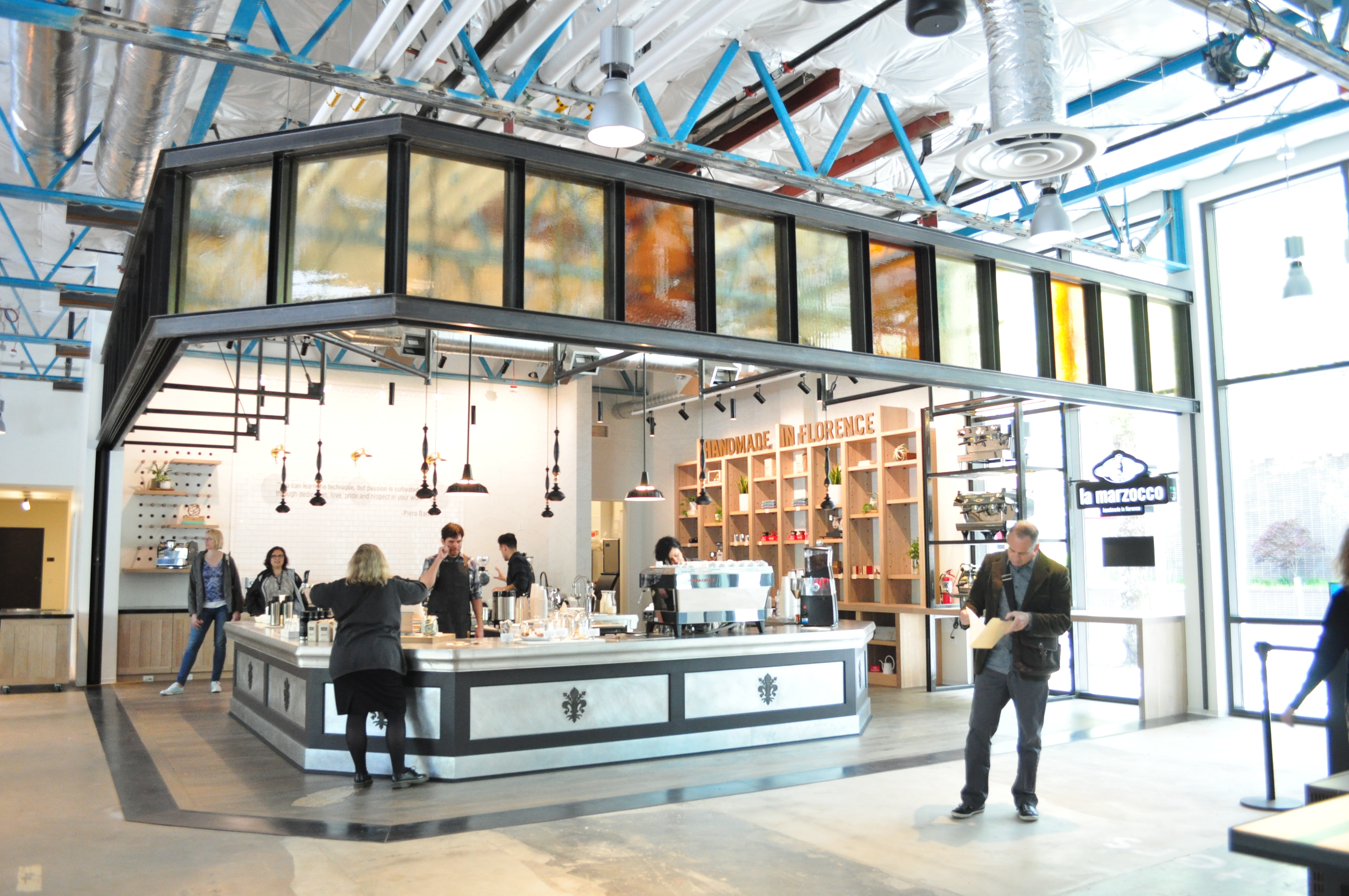
La Marzocco's first retail shop (and coffeehouse) in the United States, at the Gathering Space, KEXP Studio, Seattle Center, Seattle, Washington (2016)

In 1978, after visiting the La Marzocco factory in Florence, Kent Bakke and his partners from Hibble & Hyde’s café in Pioneer Square, Seattle were authorized by the Bambi family to begin importing La Marzocco machines to the United States. Bakke and his associates, including John Blackwell and Joe Monaghan, exhibited one of the machines on a portable espresso cart at the 1979 Edmonds Arts Festival. Bakke's ESF (future Espresso Specialists) Inc. eventually became the exclusive supplier of La Marzocco machines for Starbucks in 1988.

In 1994, Bakke and his partners purchased a 90% stake in La Marzocco, forming La Marzocco International, LLC, a formal partnership between the Bambi family and their investors under Bakke's leadership. That same year, La Marzocco began manufacturing machines for Starbucks at a new factory in Seattle run by Blackwell, supporting the rapid expansion of Starbucks franchises in the following years. Starbucks would continue to use La Marzocco machines in nearly all their locations until 2004, when they transitioned to super-automatic espresso machines.

In early 2021, La Marzocco Intl. sold the majority of its shares to De'Longhi Industrial S.A, the parent company of De'Longhi S.p.A. By late 2023, De'Longhi S.p.A had purchased the majority of its parent company's shares in La Marzocco. This transfer of stock ownership resulted in the creation of a new business unit combining La Marzocco and Swiss super-automatic espresso machine manufacturer Eversys, which had been acquired by De'Longhi SpA in a process that started in 2017. This new entity, focused on the professional coffee segment, is 61.4% controlled by De'Longhi SpA, 26.6% controlled by De'Longhi Industrial S.A, and 12% controlled by the remaining shareholders of La Marzocco.

== Products ==
=== Espresso machines ===
==== Commercial espresso machines ====
- FB80
- GB5 S & X
- KB90
- Leva S & X
- Linea Classic
- Linea Classic S
- Linea PB
- Linea PBX
- Strada
- Strada S
- Strada X

All commercial machines are available in 2, 3 except the Linea Classic S (also 1 and 4); the Linea PB, the GB5 and FB80 (also 4); the Strada X (also available in 1 group).

Collaborations

- Modbar AV/ABR
- Modbar Steam
- Modbar Pour Over
- Wally Milk

==== Home espresso machines ====
- Linea Micra
- Linea Mini R
- GS3 AV/MP
- Leva X1
- Strada X1

=== Coffee grinders ===
- Swan
- Jay
- Vulcano
- Swift
- Lux D
- Pico

=== Historical models ===
- Fiorenza
- Marus
- Eureka
- National
- Mondial
- Rondine
- Aurum
- Alba
- Olimpia
- Crema-espress
- Etruria
- Comet
- Poker
- GS
- GS/2
- SMALL
- FB/70
- Mistral

== See also ==
- Bialetti
- De'Longhi
- Faema
- FrancisFrancis
- Gaggia
- La Pavoni
- Lelit
- Rancilio
- Saeco
- List of Italian companies
