= La Pavoni =

Italian espresso machine manufacturer

La Pavoni S.p.A.

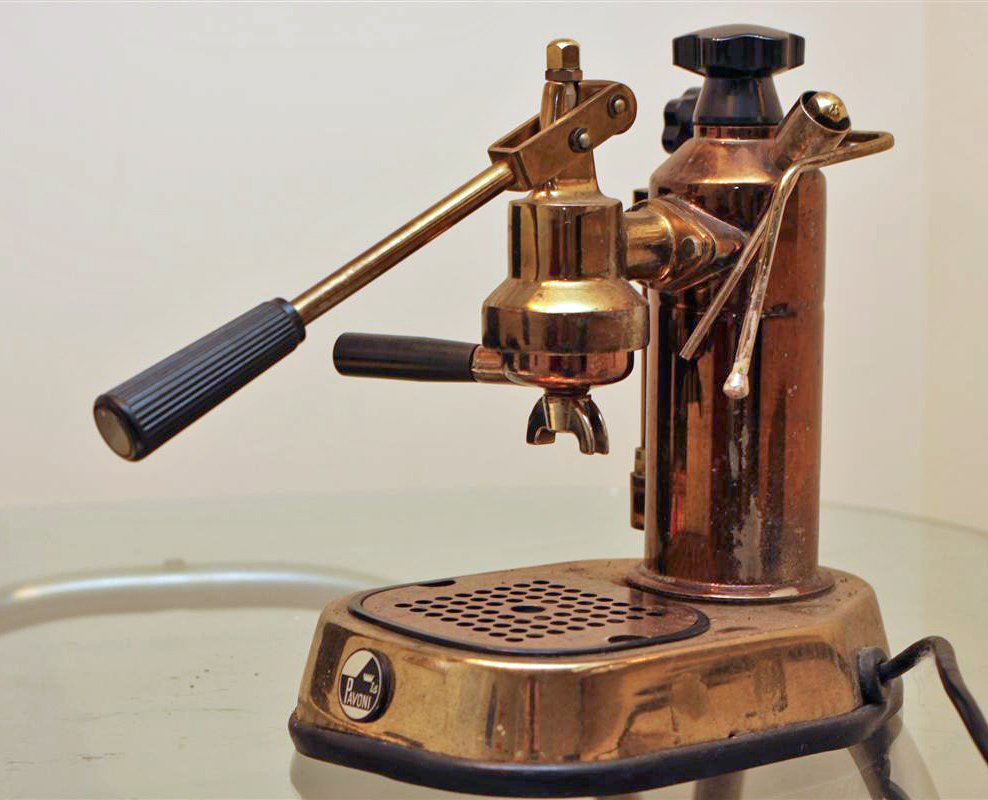
- La Pavoni Europiccola (c. 1982-1983) in brass
- Company type: Subsidiary
- Industry: Coffee
- Founded: San Giuliano Milanese, Italy 1905; 121 years ago
- Founder: Desiderio Pavoni
- Headquarters: San Giuliano Milanese, Italy
- Area served: Worldwide
- Products: Espresso machines
- Parent: Smeg Group
- Website: www.lapavoni.com

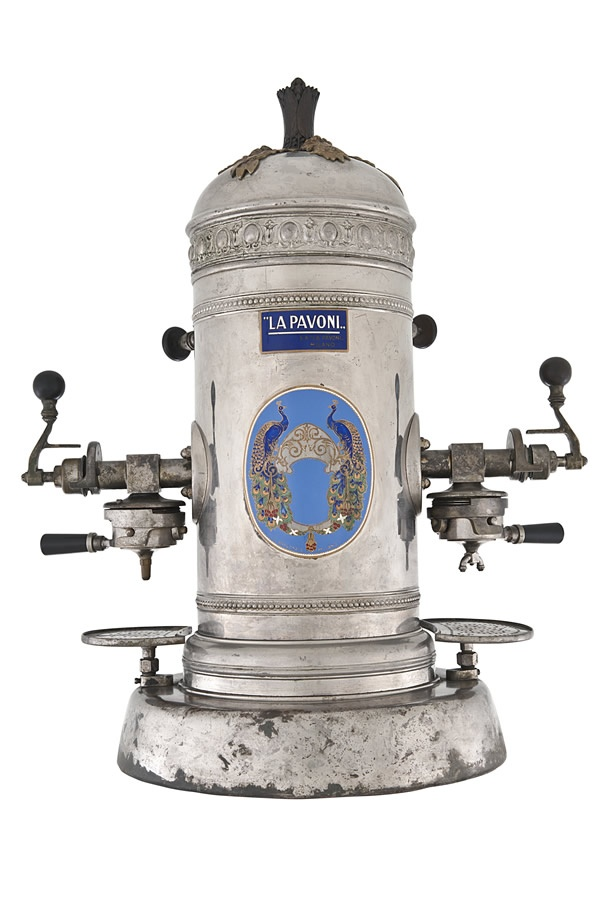
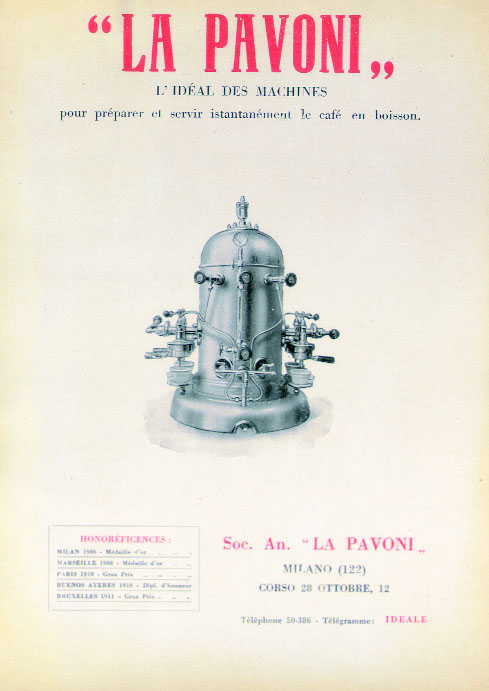
La Pavoni Ideale (c. 1910) and cover of instruction leaflet in French (1912)

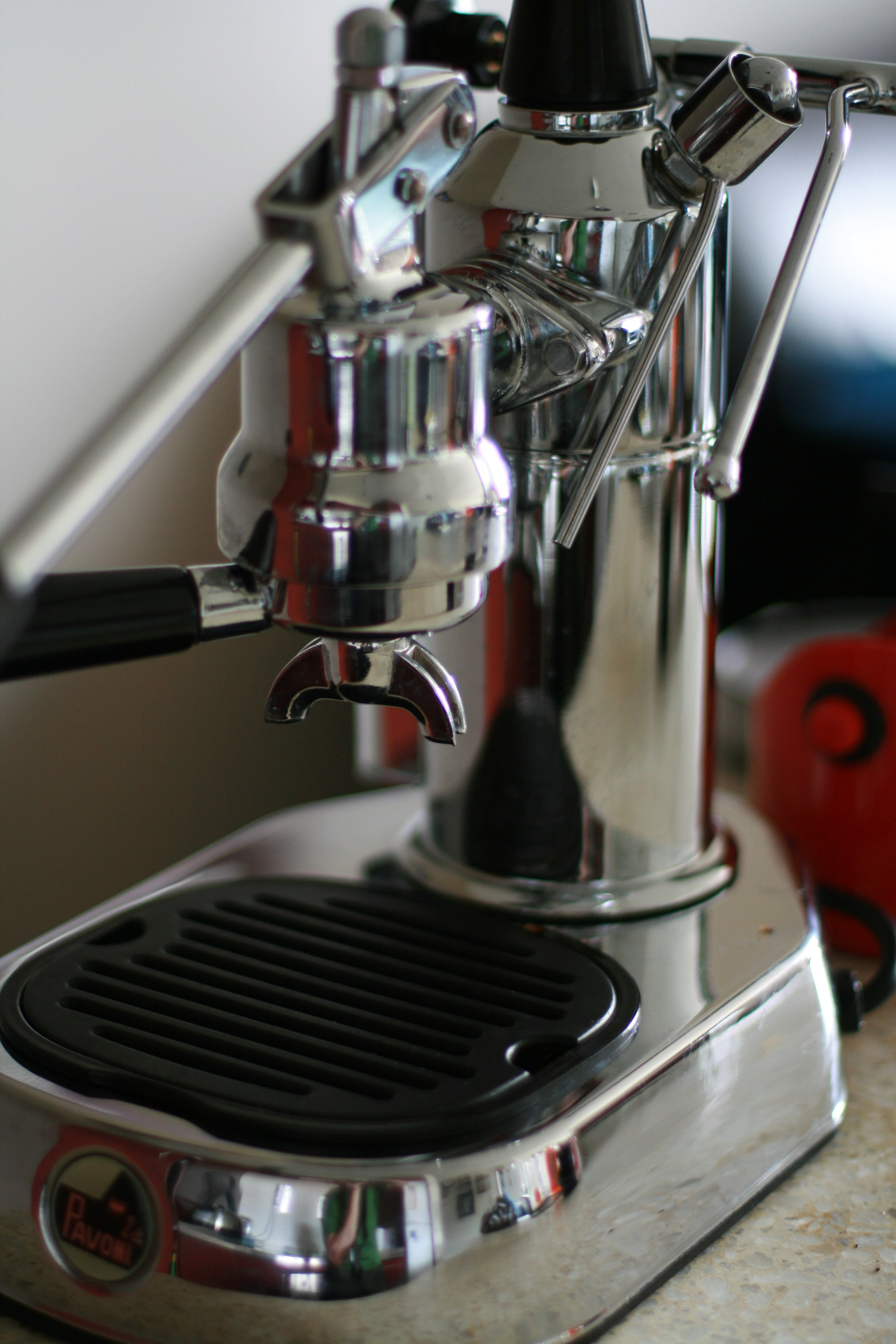
La Pavoni Europiccola "Millennium" model (c. 2001) in chrome

La Pavoni is an Italian manufacturer of espresso machines and coffee equipment founded in 1905, best known for their domestic direct-lever models, particularly the Europiccola (1961-) and Professional (1974-).

In 2005, during the company's centenary, the Museum of Modern Art (MOMA) included the 1974 La Pavoni Professional model in its “Architecture and Design: Inaugural Installation” exhibition, along with Peter Schlumbohm’s Chemex coffeemaker. The brand has been described as "the queen of espresso machines." In 2019, La Pavoni was acquired by Smeg and operates as a part of the Smeg Group.

== History ==
In 1901, Luigi Bezzera devised and patented several improvements to the earliest recognized form of steam-powered espresso machine, invented by Angelo Moriondo in 1884. The first of Bezzera's patents was submitted on 19 December 1901, titled "Innovations in the machinery to prepare and immediately serve coffee beverage"; it was granted as Patent No. 153/94, 61707 on 5 June 1902. In 1903, that patent was bought by Desiderio Pavoni, who founded the La Pavoni company and began to mass produce the machine industrially, manufacturing one machine daily in a small workshop in Via Parini, Milan. Pavoni's first machine, the Ideale, was based on and similar to Bezzera's Gigante.

=== Europiccola and Professional models ===
In 1961, the same year that Faema launched the E61, La Pavoni introduced the Europiccola: a compact direct-lever home espresso machine with a 49mm group, a 50mm piston cylinder, and a single 800ml boiler. This first version lacked a sight glass for monitoring the water level inside the boiler, which was added to the 1962 model. The Europiccola was exhibited at that year’s Strasbourg Trade Fair, going on to become the company’s signature and most successful model, estimated to have sold 500,000 machines by 2005.

The company also manufactured Europiccolas that were branded and sold as the first Olympia Cremina home espresso machines. This continued until 1967 when Olympia brought production in-house.

La Pavoni introduced their Professional model in 1974, doubling the capacity of the boiler to 1600ml, equipping it with a pressurestat, and adding a pressure gauge atop the sight glass to allow both the water level and pressure inside the boiler to be monitored at a glance.

Discussing the rise in La Pavoni's popularity, and the Europiccola and Professional designs specifically, cultural historian Nina Börnsen argues in her book on Italian design that,

The rising standard of living in the western world, its pursuit and refinement of the pleasures of life, also led to an interest in attractive household appliances. Italian kitchen appliances became as popular as its cuisine. La Pavoni had a technological and functional appeal but, as a small steam engine, also had a nostalgic charm. One of the most popular espresso machines, it is also a status symbol.

Starting in 1996, La Pavoni briefly produced the Gaggia Factory models G015 and G016 (corresponding to the La Pavoni Europiccola and Professional) noted for their distinctive conical boiler cap, for which they became known as the ‘Tin Man’ machines.

From 1997, La Pavoni began introducing more plastic parts into the machines, including a plastic boiler cap and Teflon piston.

=== "Millennium" versions ===
In 2001, La Pavoni introduced a number of significant changes to the Europiccola and Professional designs, including a new group, with a slightly larger 51mm group head and a notably larger 60mm diameter piston cylinder, which visibly changed the external proportions of the group head, as well as a Teflon piston sleeve and nylon group head insert. These later models became collectively known as the "Millennium" or "post-millennium" models; all prior Europiccola and Professional machines with the original 49mm group are now generally referred to as "pre-millennium." As a result of these changes, many parts and accessories are incompatible between pre-millennium and post-millennium machines, including portafilters, filter baskets, and tampers.

== In popular culture ==
James Hoffmann observes that La Pavoni and its Europiccola model in particular "achieved true legendary status in 1973, when it appeared in a James Bond film, but the quality of espresso that Roger Moore brews might make him the worst Bond.’ In the scene, Bond dumps milk from a mug into the thin, pale coffee gushing from his Europiccola, then inserts both the steam pipe and the relief valve pipe of the machine into the contents of the cup, briefly gurgling and spilling the liquid before handing the result to an apparently bemused M, who responds, "Is that all it does?"

In Anthony Minghella’s 1999 film The Talented Mr. Ripley, a chrome La Pavoni Professional is shown capturing Tom Ripley’s attention as part of Dickie Greenleaf’s attractive cosmopolitan lifestyle in the fictional Italian seaside town of Mongibello. As Dickie is pulling a shot in extreme close-up, he remarks, "Now you’ll find out why Miss Sherwood always shows up for breakfast, Tom. It’s not love; it’s my coffee machine." (As the film is set in the 1950s, the presence of this machine, introduced in 1974, is an obvious anachronism.)

Similarly, in Ron Howard’s 1996 film Ransom, a brass Europiccola machine appears in the kitchen of airline CEO Tom Mullen's luxurious penthouse overlooking Central Park, on the Upper East Side near the Guggenheim Museum.

In the 2002 film About a Boy, wealthy dilettante Will Freeman (Hugh Grant) identifies “home espresso makers” as an integral part of what he calls his comfortably independent “Island Living” lifestyle, as he is shown using his chrome pre-millennium Europiccola in a manner similar to Moore’s Bond.

== See also ==
- Bialetti
- De'Longhi
- Faema
- FrancisFrancis
- Gaggia
- La Marzocco
- Lelit
- Rancilio
- List of Italian companies
