= Gaggia =

Italian coffee machine manufacturer

Coordinates: 44.1895951°N 10.9448189°E

Gaggia S.p.A.
- Type: Private
- Industry: Domestic and professional espresso machines
- Founded: Robecco sul Naviglio, Italy, 1947; 79 years ago
- Founder: Giovanni Achille Gaggia
- Headquarters: Gaggio Montano, Italy
- Area served: Worldwide
- Products: Espresso machines
- Parent: Evoca Group
- Website: Domestic coffee machines Professional coffee machines

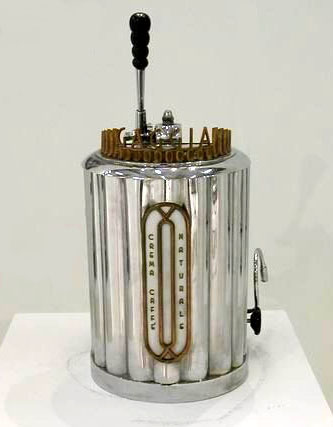
Gaggia Classica, 1948

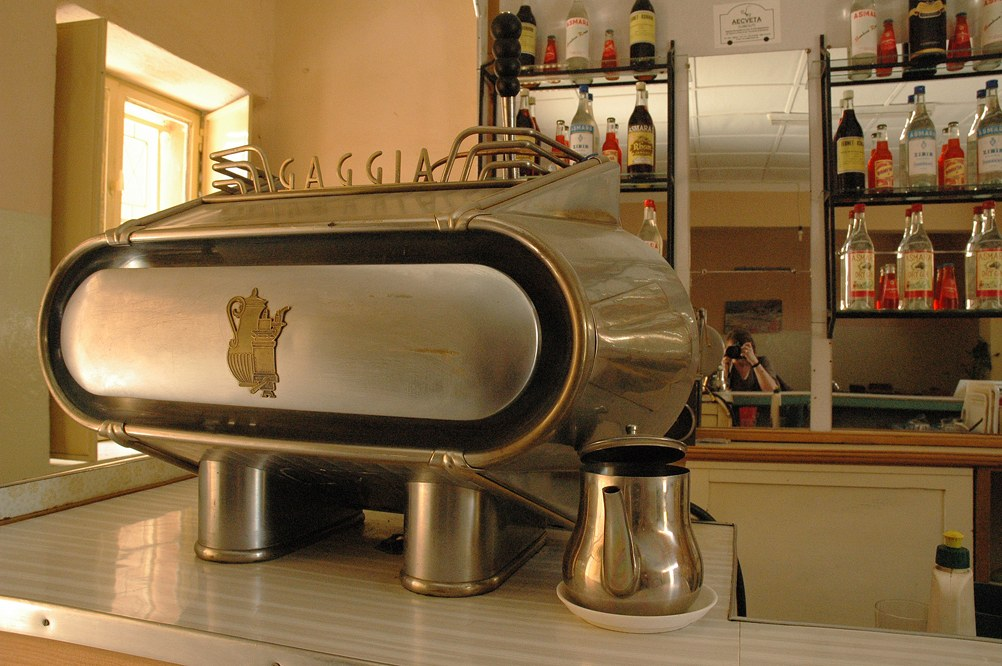
Gaggia Internazionale two-group machine, c. 1950, on the bar at a café in Eritrea, 2008

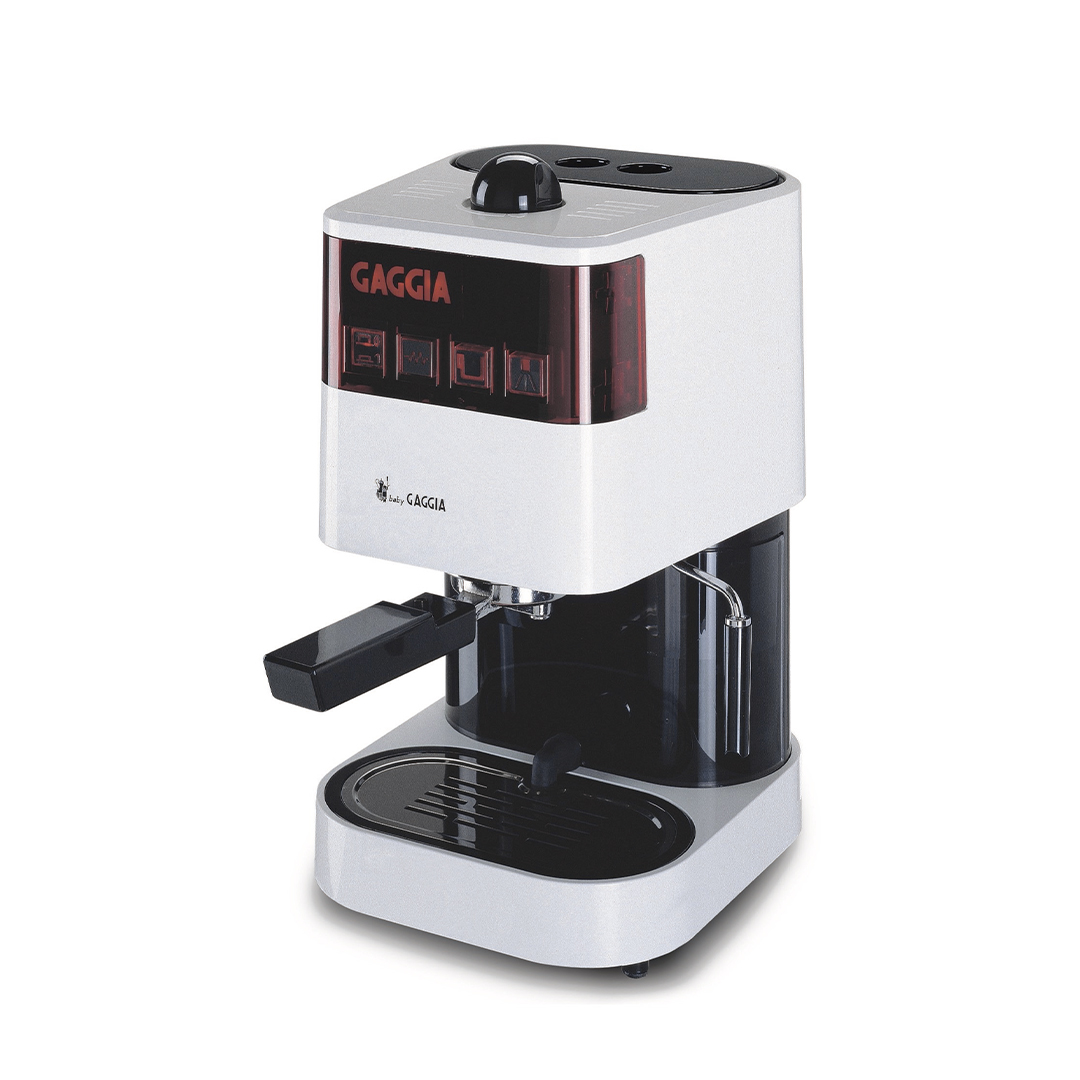
Gaggia Baby mod.86 Series I, c.1986

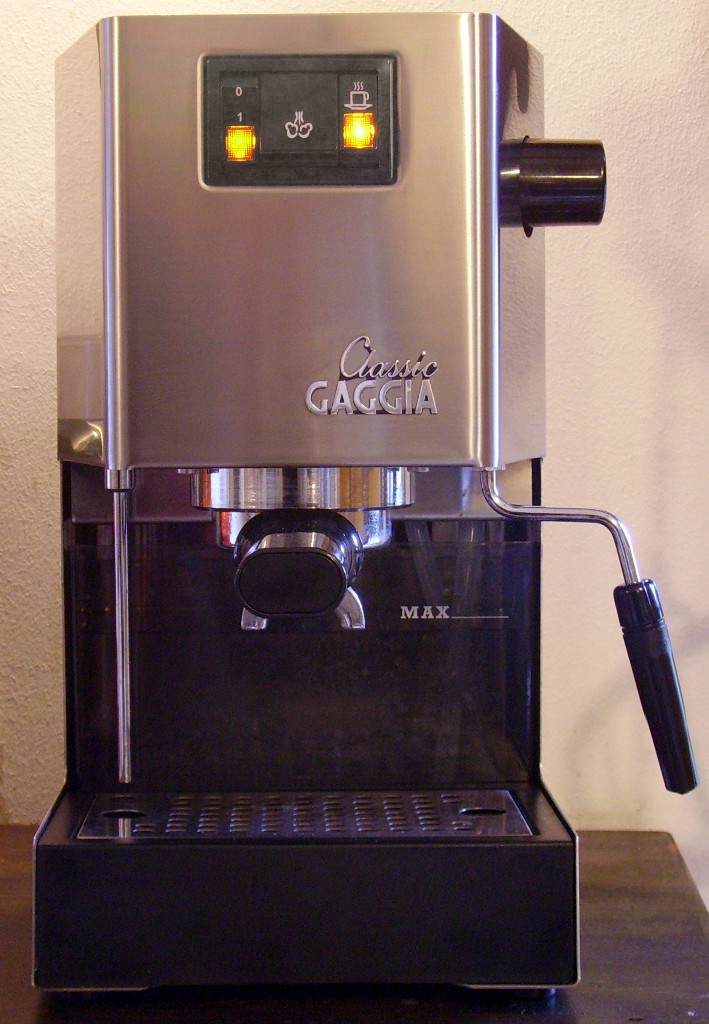
Gaggia Classic, 10/2010

Gaggia is an Italian manufacturer of coffee machines, especially espresso machines, in addition to small kitchen appliances. The company is owned by the Evoca Group.

Gaggia has four main product lines. They market automatic espresso machines, manual espresso machines, accessories, and coffee beans under the Gaggia brand name. The company continues to produce espresso machines (as well as accessories) from classic manual machines to the innovative semi-automatic and super-automatic models recently added to the line.

== History ==
The founder, Giovanni Achille Gaggia (1895–1961), applied for a patent (patent number 365726) for the first modern steamless coffee machine on 5 September 1938, to be used commercially in his coffee bar. The machine forced water to flow over the coffee grounds at a high pressure, producing the 'crema' that is unique to espresso.

The Gaggia company was founded in 1947 and formally incorporated in 1948. It first produced machines for commercial use, but shortly thereafter released the Gilda, its first home machine.

Success came when the Motta & Biffi bar in Galleria Vittorio Emanuele II, in Milan, installed a Gaggia machine. Initially the coffee machines produced by Gaggia were exclusively for professional use, but in 1977 production expanded to coffee machines for domestic use. Giovanni's son, Camillo, with his partner Armando Migliorini, expanded the business on the Navigli but encountered economic difficulties. In 1989 the company, which had a turnover of over 56 billion lire, changed ownership and was sold to the Austro-American businessman Gerhard Andlinger.

In 1991, Gaggia introduced the iconic stainless steel ‘Classic’ model, initially branded as the ‘Classic Coffee’. The Gaggia Classic has continued in production ever since, including the recent ’Classic Pro’ (aka 'GCP', 2019) and ‘Classic Pro Evo’ (RI9380, 2023) models, which added an improved ‘professional’ steam wand and a variety of colours.

Gaggia entered the superautomatic espresso machine market in 1999 with its ‘Synchrony Digital’ model.

In 2007 the Milanese company went into crisis due to a drop in sales, with the risk of closing the Robecco sul Naviglio plant and moving production to Romania and Gaggio Montano. Two years later, Gaggia follows the fate of its parent company Saeco, which had been taken over by the Dutch multinational Philips.

As of 2010, all Gaggia espresso and coffee machines were manufactured in Milan at the Robecco factory. The 2015 Gaggia Classic was built in Romania. The New Gaggia Classic is made in Italy and uses an aluminum boiler.

The Gaggia S.p. A company was purchased in 1999 by Italian competitor Saeco International Group, which in turn was purchased by Dutch manufacturer Philips in 2009. Gaggia still operates a separate line but now is using Saeco designs in some of its domestic espresso machines. Before the takeover by Philips, most domestic espresso machines from Gaggia had aluminium boilers. Now they have stainless steel boilers.

In 2017 Philips sold the Saeco Professional division, along with the Gaggia brand, to N&W Global Vending SpA, an Italian Bergamo based company known as a leader in vending machines for drinks and snacks. In November, 2017 N&W changed its name to Evoca Group, which revitalized the Gaggio Montano plant in Bologna. The company specialized in the production of machines for bars and restaurants and relaunched the Gaggia brand.

== In popular culture ==
In Wolf Mankowitz’s 1957 short story ‘Expresso Bongo: The Story of the Making of a Modern Idol’ for the Daily Express, the anonymous narrator frequents a fictional “expresso” bar in Frith Street, Soho, called the ‘Tom-Tom’, at which his client Bongo Herbert is paid to perform, and which features “a pretty young man playing the Gaggia coffee machine with the dash of a theater organist,” providing crowds of customers with “café expresso and doughnuts” at one hour, and “pizzas and expressos” later. In an attempt to induce Garrick Records to sign his client, the narrator plies their “hard-to-get talent spotter” Mr. Mayer with “cappuccino” from the Gaggia. Cultural historians Jingan Young and Stephen Glynn agree that the persistent “misspelling of espresso as ‘expresso’ [in Mankowitz’s story] acts as ‘a pun between the new Italian coffee and the commissioning newspaper [that] helped to cement the common error of pronouncing “expresso” instead of “espresso”.’” Mankowitz subsequently adapted his story into a 1958 West End musical of the same name. The play was a hit, and the original story was reprinted in The Atlantic. He then adapted the musical into a 1959 film starring Cliff Richard, in which a Gaggia machine features prominently.

== See also ==
- Bialetti
- De'Longhi
- Faema
- FrancisFrancis
- La Marzocco
- La Pavoni
- Lelit
- Rancilio
- List of Italian companies
