= Faema =

Italian espresso machine manufacturer

Coordinates: 45.3375163°N 9.0957309°E

FAEMA
- Type: Private
- Industry: Domestic & professional espresso machines
- Founded: Milan, Italy, 1945; 81 years ago
- Founder: Carlo Ernesto Valente
- Headquarters: Binasco, Italy
- Area served: Worldwide
- Products: Espresso machines
- Parent: Cimbali
- Website: faema.com

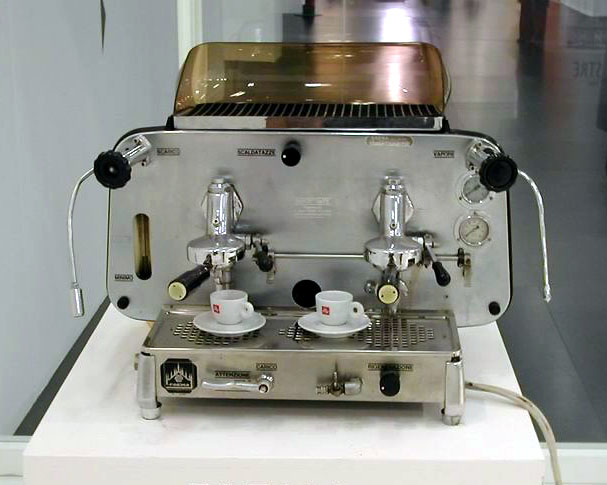
Faema E61

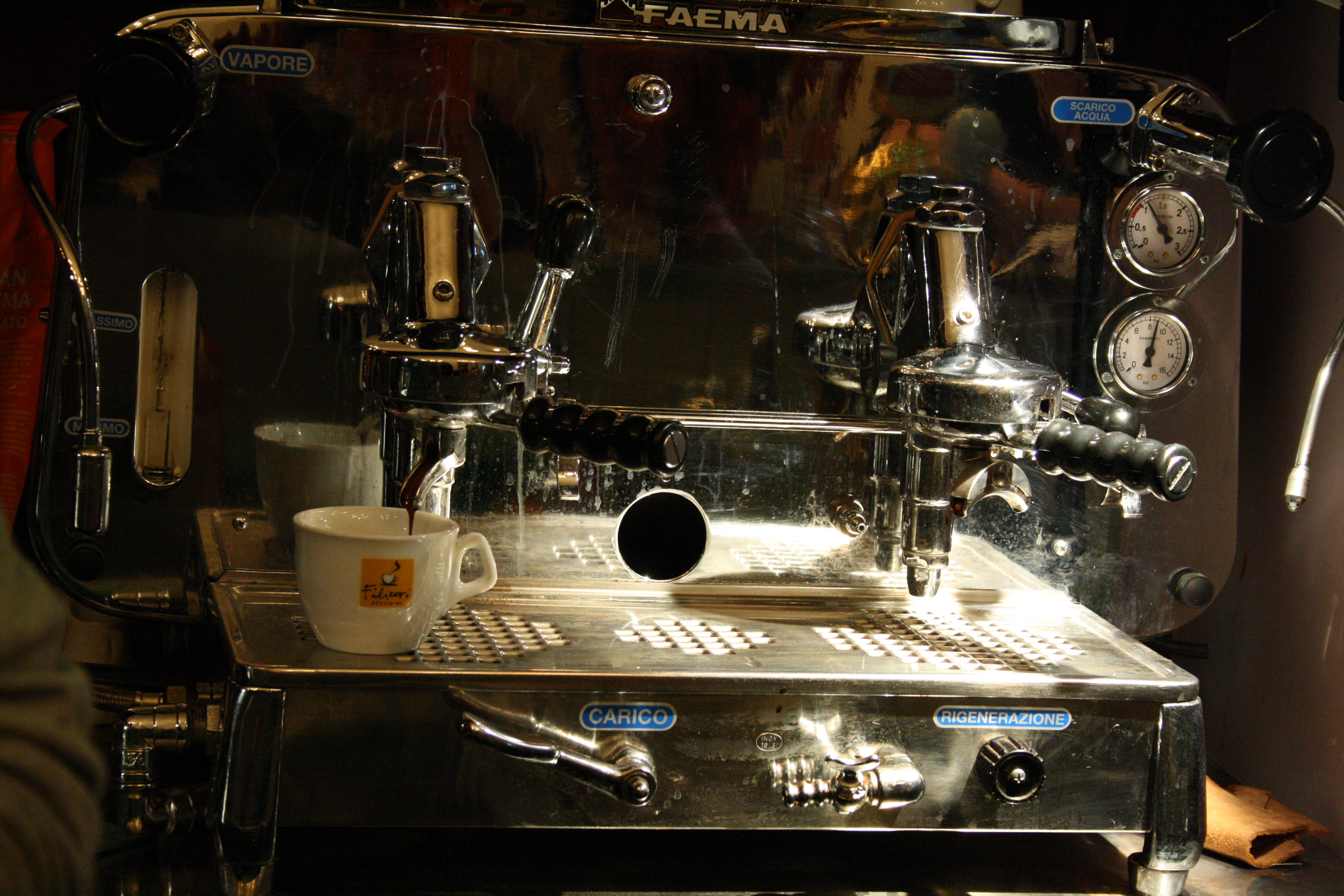
A Faema professional espresso machine

FAEMA (Italian acronym: Fabbrica Apparecchiature Elettromeccaniche e Affini) primarily engaged in the production of espresso machines, was founded in 1945 by Carlo Ernesto Valente, in Milan, Italy. Faema was to become synonymous with the post-war production boom in Italy, by actively pursuing technological innovation as the company's driving force.

== Cycling team ==
Faema has a long history of sponsoring cycling teams. They have acted as the main or sole sponsor of numerous cycling teams for many years, but also as co-sponsor. The best-known rider competing for a team sponsored by Faema was 5-time Tour de France champion Eddy Merckx.

== See also ==
- Bialetti
- De'Longhi
- FrancisFrancis
- Gaggia
- La Marzocco
- La Pavoni
- Rancilio
- Saeco
