= Angelo Moriondo =

Italian inventor (1851–1914)

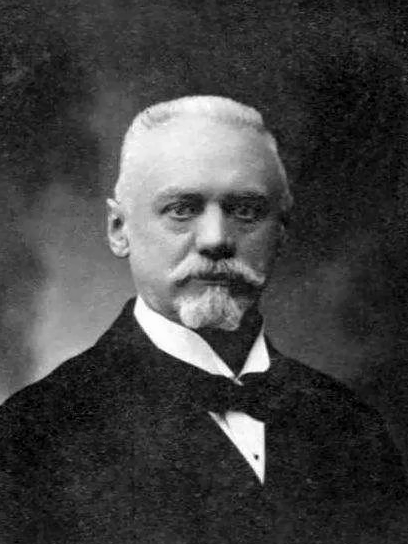
- Born: 6 June 1851; Turin, Kingdom of Sardinia
- Died: 31 May 1914 (aged 62); Marentino, Turin, Italy
- Occupation: Inventor
- Known for: Inventing the espresso coffee machine

Angelo Moriondo (6 June 1851 – 31 May 1914) was an Italian inventor, who is usually credited with patenting the earliest known espresso machine, in 1884. His machine used a combination of steam and boiling water to efficiently brew coffee.

== Early life ==
Moriondo came from an entrepreneurial family. His grandfather founded a liqueur producing company that was continued by his father Giacomo, who later founded the chocolate company Moriondo and Gariglio, along with his brother Agostino and cousin Gariglio. Angelo purchased the Grand-Hotel Ligure in the city-centre Piazza Carlo Felice and the American Bar in the Galleria Nazionale of Via Roma.

== First espresso machine ==
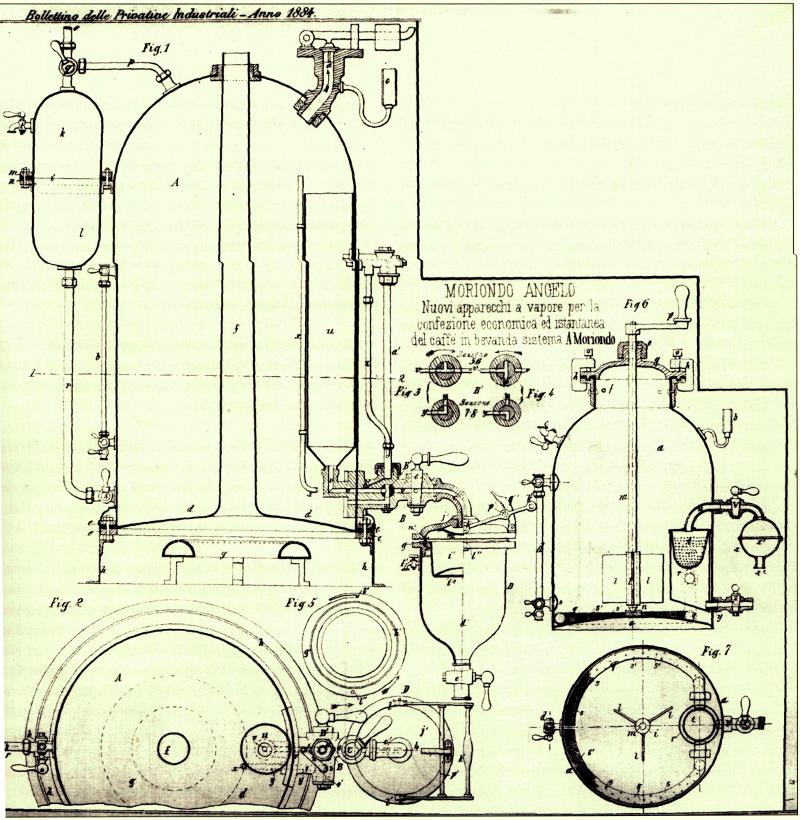
First patent (16 May 1884) of the espresso coffee machine

Moriondo presented his invention at the General Expo of Turin in 1884, where it was awarded the bronze medal. The patent was awarded for a period of six years on 16 May 1884 under the title of "New steam machinery for the economic and instantaneous confection of coffee beverage, method ‘A. Moriondo’." The machine was built by a mechanic named Martina, working under the direct supervision of the inventor.

It was successively updated with a patent on 20 November 1884, Vol 34, No, 381. The invention was then confirmed by international patent application after being registered in Paris on 23 October 1885. In the following years, Moriondo continued to improve his invention drastically, each improvement being patented.

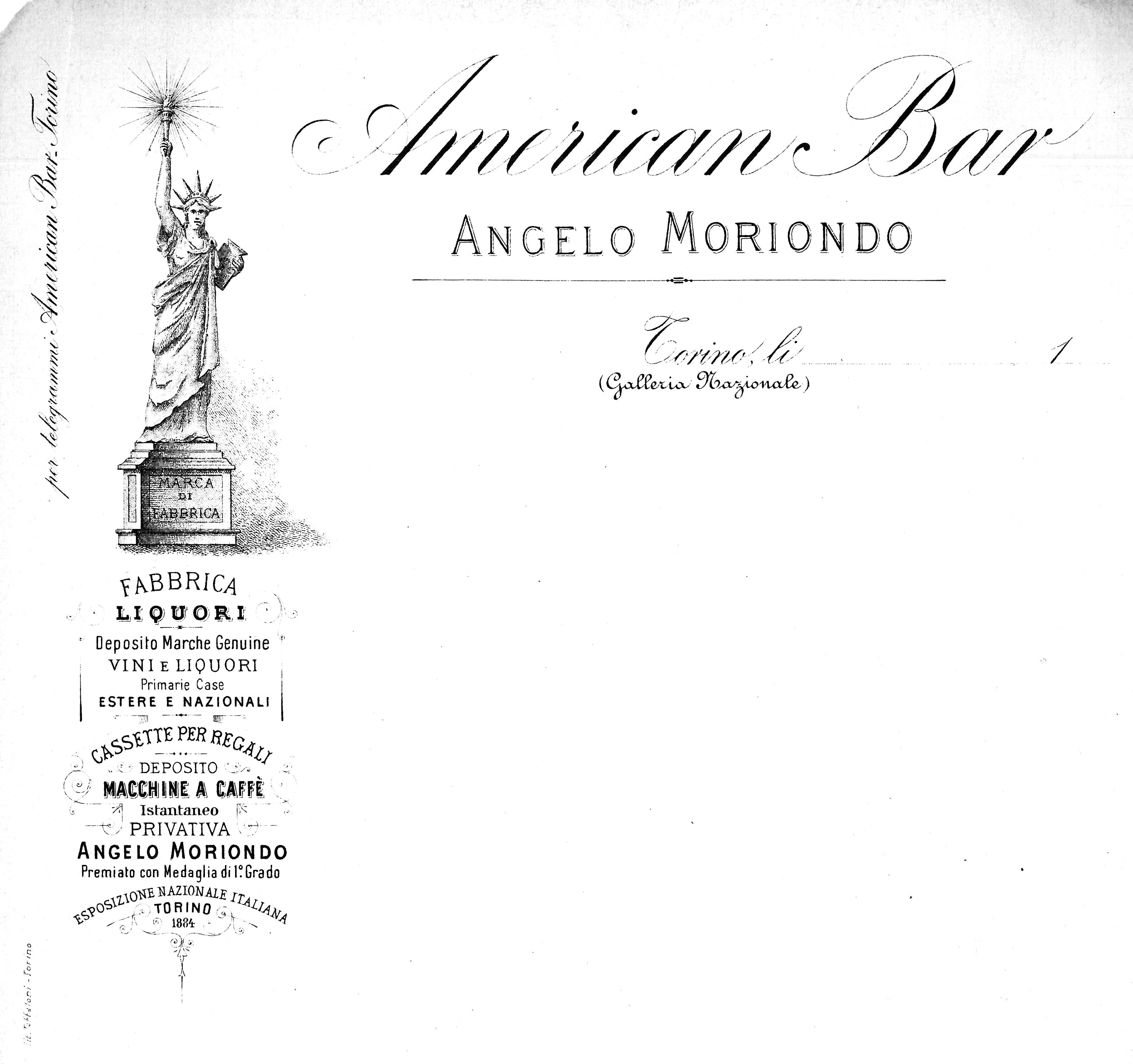
American Bar in Galleria Nazionale

Moriondo never took the invention to industrial-scale production. He limited himself to the construction of a few hand-built machines, which he jealously conserved in his establishments, convinced that this was a significant advertisement for them.

Ian Bersten, a historian chronicling the history of coffee, describes the device as "the first Italian bar machine that controlled the supply of steam and water separately through the coffee" and Moriondo as "one of the earliest discoverers of the expresso machine." Unlike later espresso machines, it was a bulk brewer and did not brew coffee for the individual customer.

== Legacy ==
On 6 June 2022, search engine Google commemorated Moriondo with a Doodle on his 171st birthday.
