= Espresso machine =

Device used to brew espresso coffee

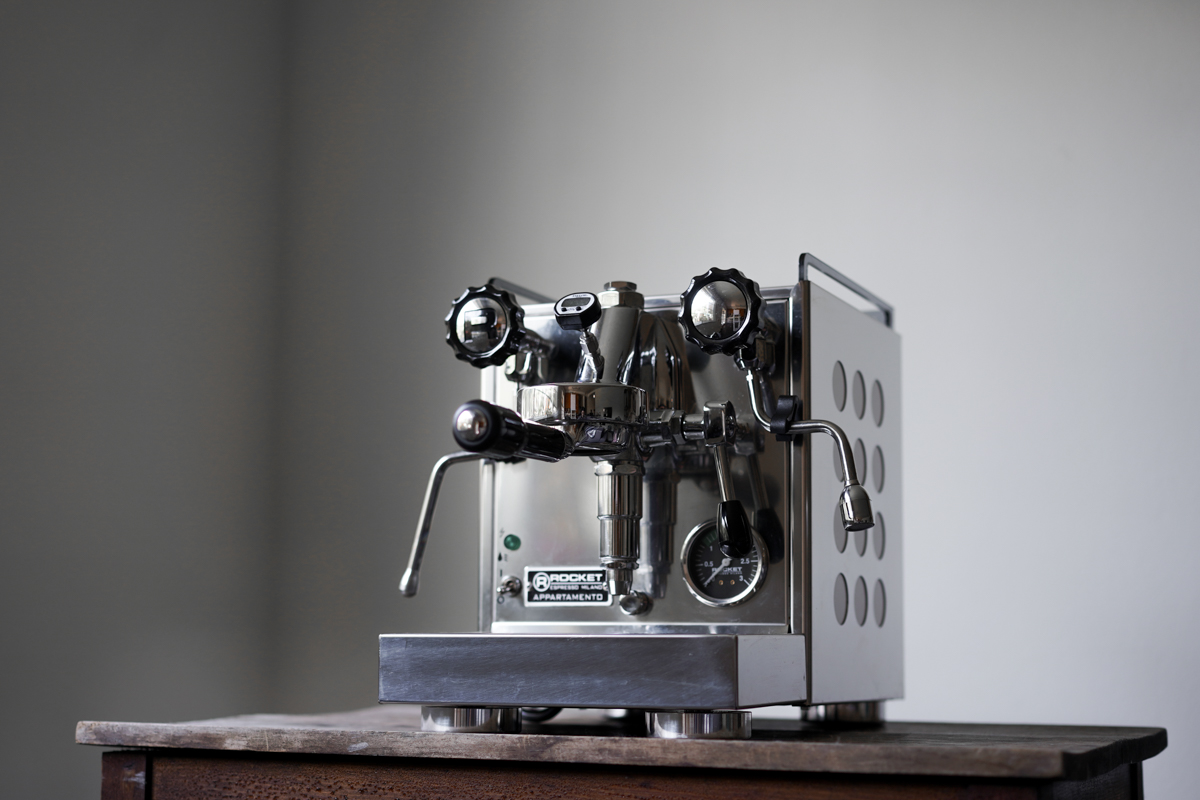
E61 semi-automatic 'prosumer' espresso machine, Rocket Appartamento, 2019

Espresso being brewed (video)

An espresso machine is a device that brews coffee by rapidly forcing heated, pressurized water through a small, compressed cake (commonly called a puck) of finely ground coffee and a coffee filter to produce a thick, concentrated coffee called espresso.

Espresso machines vary significantly in design and operation. They may be steam-driven, piston-driven, pump-driven or air-pump-driven, and may be manual, semi-automatic, or fully automatic in operation. An espresso machine may even incorporate a built-in coffee grinder, and, in the case of a superautomatic machine, mechanisms for automating the entire process, such that a shot of espresso may be produced by a single touch from the user. They range in size and application from small appliances to much larger commercial appliances and coffee vending machines, including 'prosumer' machines which combine commercial or professional features in consumer machines.

Despite this variety, many espresso machines may be understood to share some common elements, such as a portafilter (comprising a filter basket, a locking mechanism, and an attachment method such as a handle) and a grouphead to which it attaches prior to the brewing process, and through which the heated, pressurized water is introduced to the puck of ground coffee prior to filtration.

An espresso machine may also have an auxiliary steam wand (or wands) used to steam and froth milk or non-dairy milks for coffee drinks such as cappuccino and caffè latte, including microfoam which may be used for latte art.

== History ==
=== Precursors ===
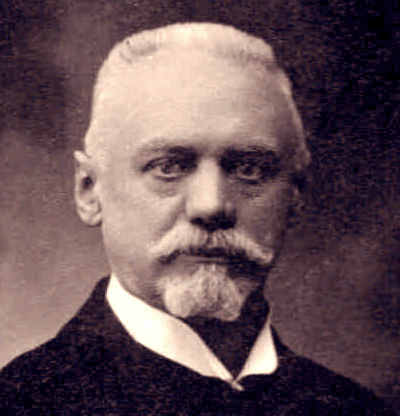
Angelo Moriondo, inventor of an important precursor of the espresso machine

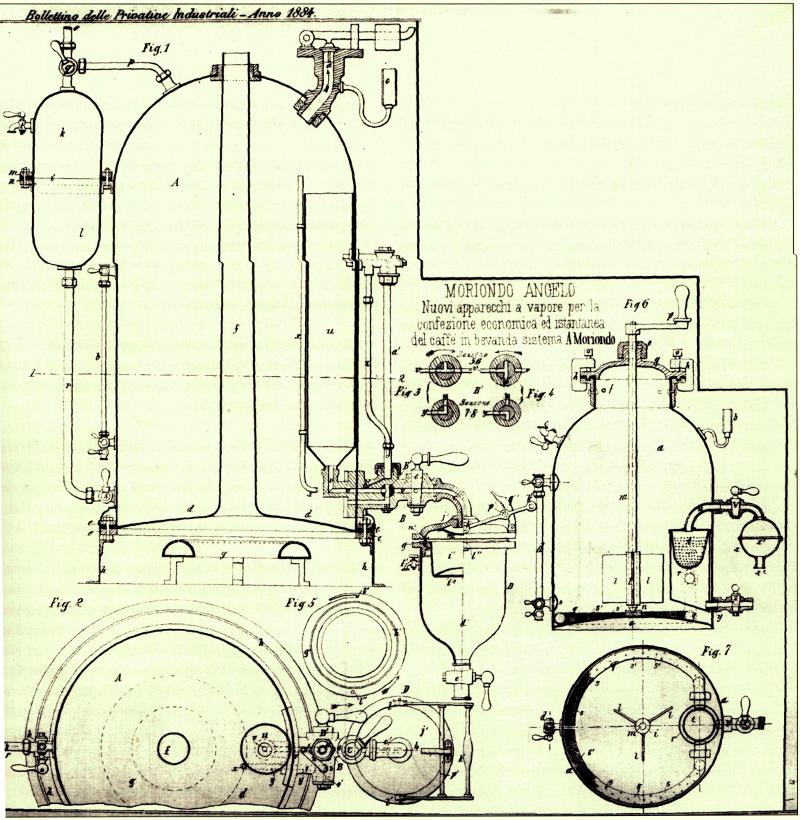
First patent (vol. 33 n. 256, 1884) for the espresso machine, by Angelo Moriondo

Angelo Moriondo, from Turin, patented a steam-driven "instantaneous" coffee beverage making device in 1884 (No. 33/256). The device is "almost certainly the first Italian bar machine that controlled the supply of steam and water separately through the coffee" and Moriondo is "certainly one of the earliest discoverers of the expresso [sic] machine, if not the earliest". He was granted patent no. 33/256 dated 16 May 1884 (according to the "Bollettino delle privative industriali del Regno d'Italia", 2nd Series, Volume 15, Year 1884, pp. 635 – 655). Unlike true espresso machines, it brewed in bulk, not as individual servings.

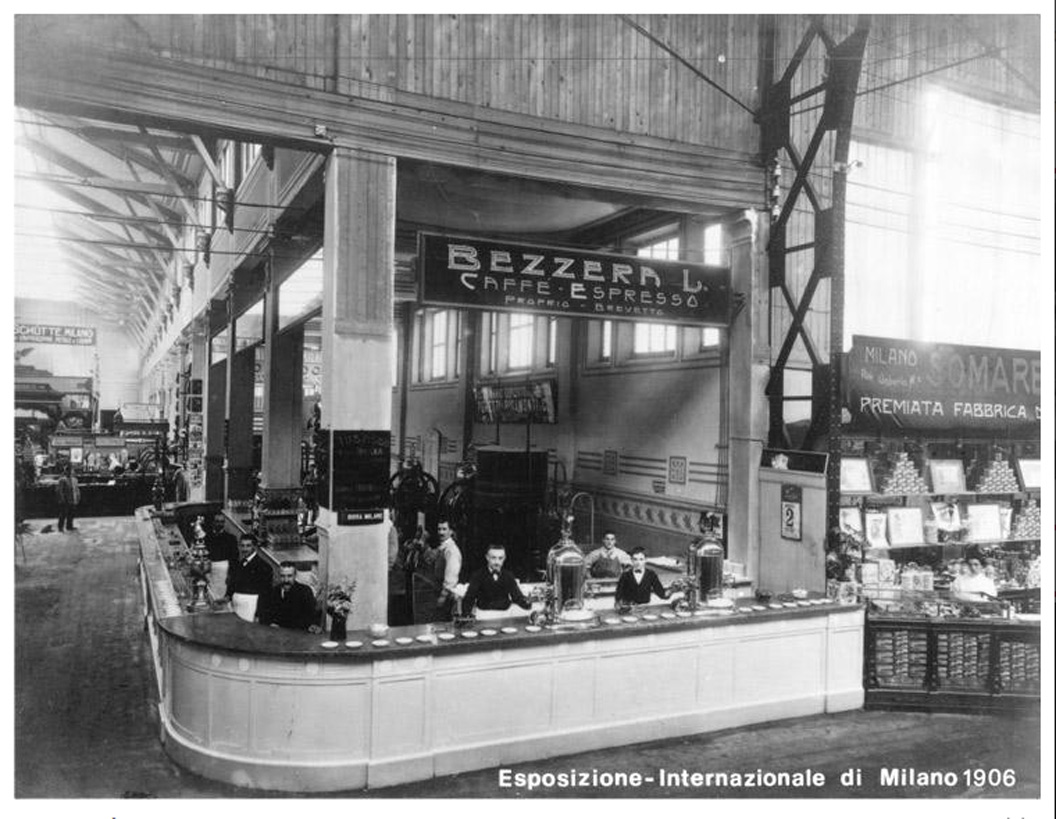
Luigi Bezzera and one of the first espresso machines at the World Expo 1906 in Milan, Italy

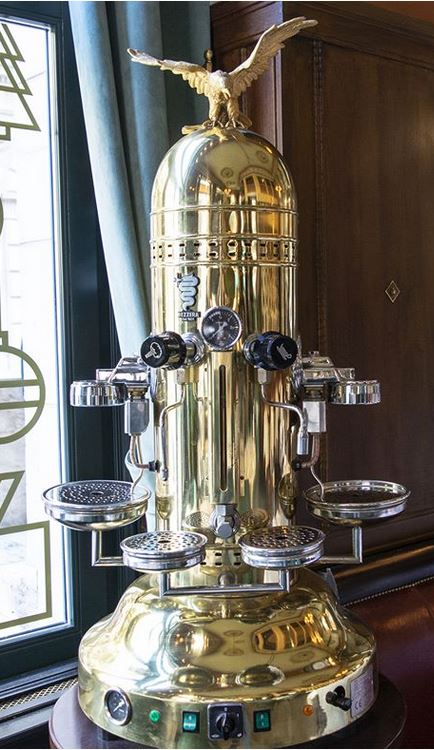
Bezzera Eagle 2 Coffee Maker, presented at Central Cafe Budapest

Seventeen years later, in 1901, Luigi Bezzera, from Milan, devised and patented several improvements to the espresso machine, the first of which was applied for on 19 December 1901. Titled "Innovations in the machinery to prepare and immediately serve coffee beverage"; Patent No. 153/94, 61707, was granted on 5 June 1902. In 1903, the patent was bought by Desiderio Pavoni, who founded the La Pavoni company and began to produce the machine industrially, manufacturing one machine daily in a small workshop in Via Parini, Milan.

== Drive mechanism ==
Numerous machine designs have been created to produce espresso. Several machines share some common elements.

Varying the fineness of the grind, the amount of pressure used to tamp the grinds, or the pressure itself can adjust the taste of the espresso. Some baristas pull espresso shots directly into a preheated demitasse cup or shot glass to maintain the espresso's higher temperature.

=== Piston-driven ===
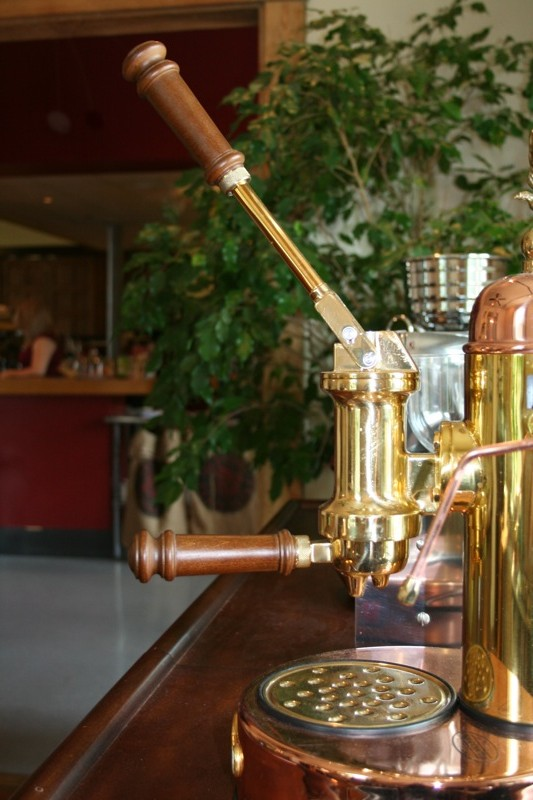
A manual piston espresso machine made by Elektra

The piston-driven, or lever-driven, machine was developed in Italy in 1945 by Achille Gaggia, founder of espresso machine manufacturer Gaggia. The design generically uses a lever, pumped by the operator, to pressurize hot water and send it through the coffee grounds. The act of producing a shot of espresso is colloquially termed pulling a shot, because these lever-driven espresso machines required pulling a long handle to produce a shot. Lever-driven espresso machines are sometimes called manual espresso machines because of this.

There are two types of lever machines; manual piston and spring piston design. With the manual piston, the operator directly pushes the water through the grounds. In the spring piston design, the operator works to tension a spring, which then delivers the pressure for the espresso (usually 8 to 10 bar; 116 to 145 psi).

=== Steam-driven ===
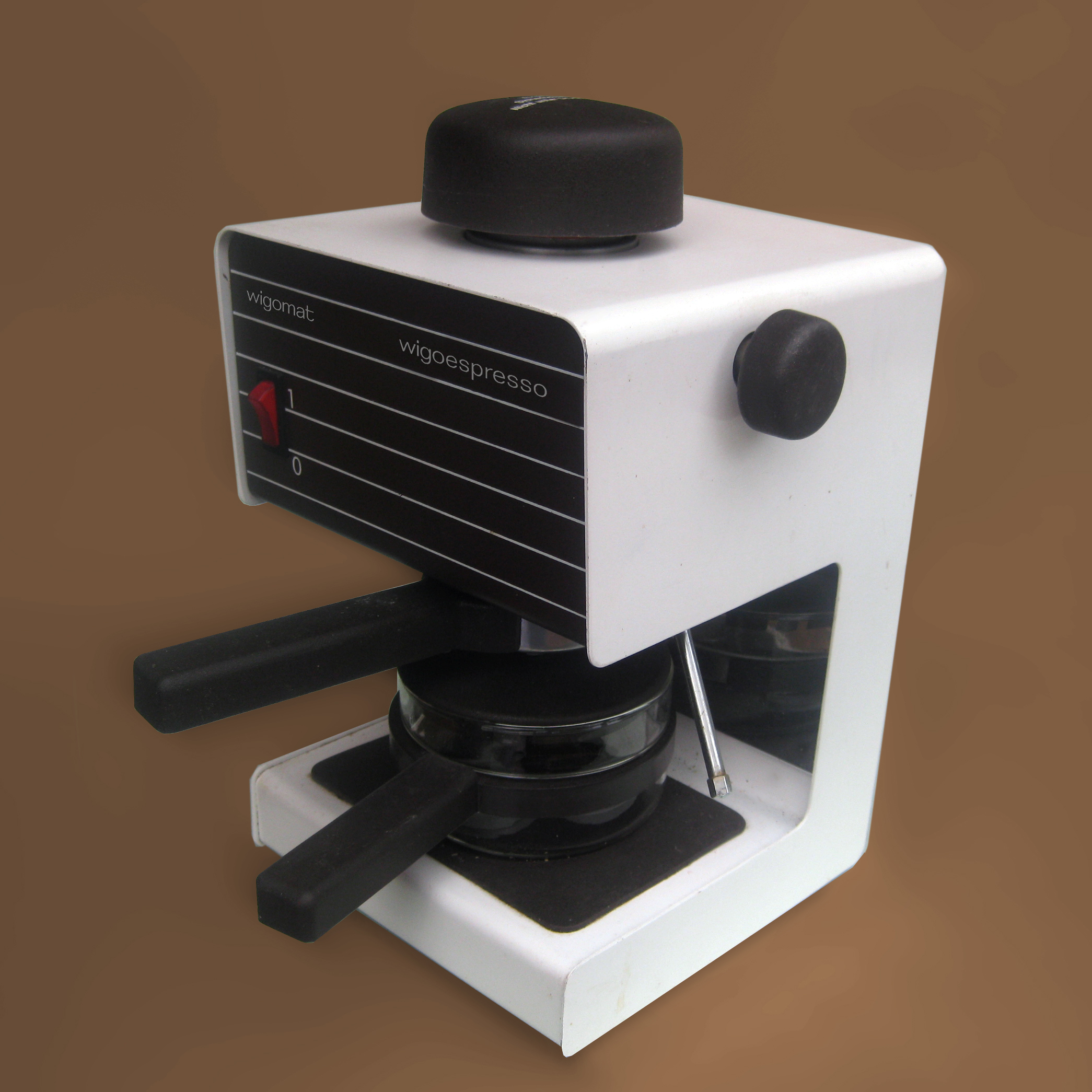
A countertop steam-driven espresso machine, Wigomat Wigoespresso (1975)

A steam-driven unit operates by forcing water through the coffee by using steam or steam pressure. The first espresso machines were steam types, produced when a common boiler was piped to four group heads so that multiple types of coffee could be made at the same time. This design is still used today in lower-cost consumer machines, as it does not need to contain moving parts. Also, steam-driven machines do not produce as high a pressure for extraction compared with pump-driven. This results in the crema, a hallmark of an espresso, being of lower quality.

=== Pump-driven ===
A refinement of the piston machine is the pump-driven machine, which was introduced in the Faema E61 in 1961, and has become the most popular design in commercial espresso bars. Instead of using manual force, a motor-driven pump provides the force necessary for espresso brewing. Espresso machines are made to accept water directly from a cold water line supply, common in commercial installations, or from a separate tank that must be filled with water by hand. The latter is more common with lower-volume commercial installations and domestic espresso machines. Due to the required high pumping pressure and precision flow control needed, the particular type of electric pumps typically used are known as solenoid-piston pumps. These pumps are classified as a positive displacement type (general category) of pump.

Four variants exist in home machines, depending on how brew water and steam are boiled; in discussion these are generally known by acronyms.

Single boiler (SB)
These machines can brew only, and not steam, requiring only a single boiler. They are relatively uncommon, with steam wands being a simple and valued addition.
Single boiler, dual use (SB/DU)
Some home pump espresso machines use a single chamber both to heat water to brewing temperature and to boil water for steaming milk. However, they can perform only one operation at a time, requiring a warm up period between the execution of espresso pull and the milk frothing process. Since the temperature for brewing is less than the temperature for creating steam the machine requires time to make the transition from one mode to the other. Moreover, after the brewing process, a single boiler will expel (usually minor) quantities of water through the steam wand that were left over from brewing, which can cause the steam heated milk to then have a slightly watered down taste. To avoid this, the leftover water needs to be collected from the steam wand before steaming of the milk should begin. SB/DUs are generally found within the lower tiers of enthusiast home models, with steam wands being a simple and valued addition.
Heat exchanger (HX)
Some machines use a single boiler kept at steaming temperature, but water for brewing is passed through a heat exchanger, taking some heat from the steam without rising to the same temperature. Although the water for brewing remains at a lower range than that required for steaming milk, it is still too hot for proper coffee extraction without first cooling; thus this type of machine requires a cooling flush of 4–6 seconds prior to the first espresso pull. Once the machine is dialed into the proper temperature, as many shots can be pulled as required without refreshing. However, if the user leaves the machine idle again for some period, the flushing process will need to be repeated. The HX variety is found in many mid-range machines and many users install thermometers to assist them in dialing in correct temperatures. There is some controversy as to the temperature stability of the brewing water, since it is indirectly converted from steaming temperature to brewing temperature, rather than kept at a brewing temperature. One big advantage of heat exchanger over the other system is the water used for extraction is always fresh from the water source, which can be from the water tank or water network. The stale water gets flushed during the routine flushing, instead of using stale stagnant water retained within the boiler.
The first HX was the Faema E61 of 1961, a design nearly ubiquitous across the semi-automatic market segment of espresso machines.
Dual boiler (DB)
Finally, in some espresso machines for commercial or home use, water for brewing is heated in a separate chamber, which requires two separate boilers. It is primarily found in higher-end machines, but also in some mid-range machines, overlapping with HX.
The term dual boiler is used narrowly for machines with two separate boilers, and more broadly for what are more properly called dual heater (DH) machines, featuring a boiler for brewing and a separate thermoblock (TB) for heating brew water to steaming temperature—opposite to HX machines, where the boiler is at steaming temperature and is cooled to brewing temperature.
In principle, TB machines yield a more stable brew temperature at the expense of steaming performance and speed, while HX machines yield better steaming at the expense of stable brew temperature. True DB machines provide stable brew temperatures and fast steaming, but are larger and more expensive. The downside is the boiler specifically for brewing espresso consist of mainly stagnant water with little turnover, which repeatedly gets boiled again with little introduction of fresh water.
The first DB was the La Marzocco GS of 1970.

== Machine parts ==
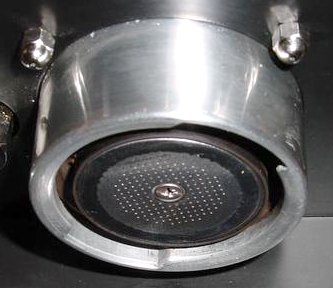
A grouphead from a domestic espresso machine

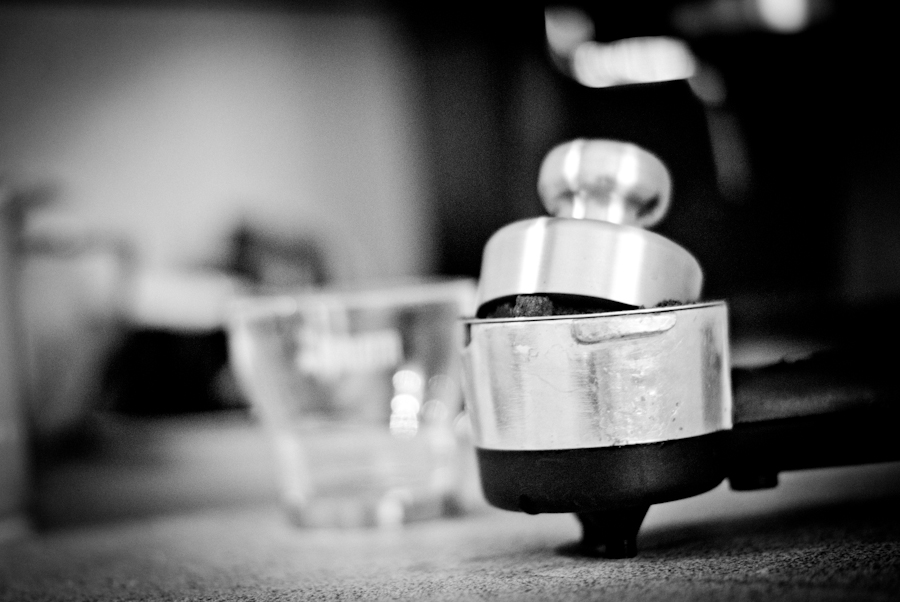
Portafilter of a home espresso machine with a tamper on it

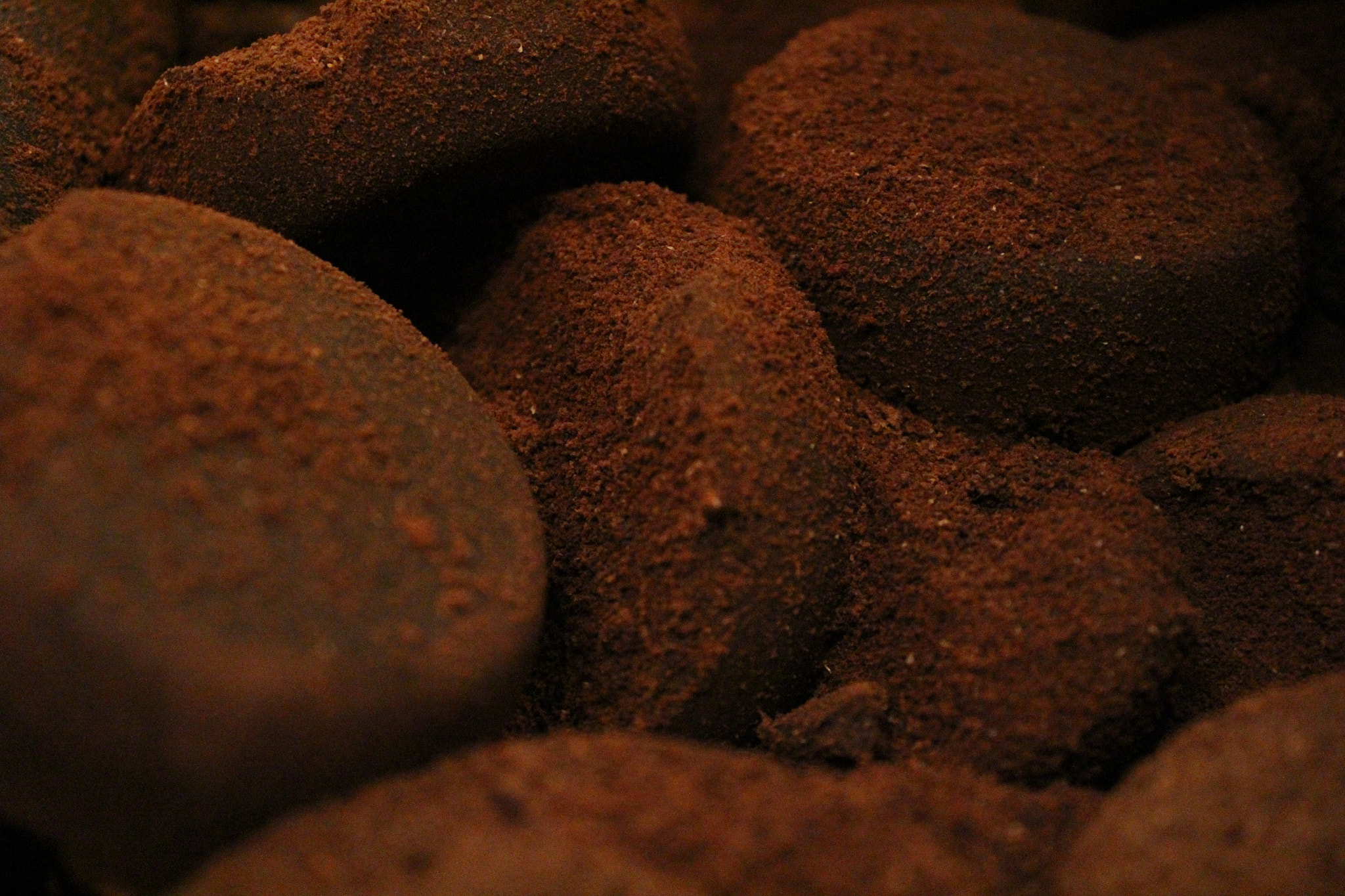
Pucks of compressed used coffee grounds, each left over after the extraction of an espresso

A grouphead (or group head) is the receiver for the removable portafilter (or group handle). A typical consumer espresso machine normally has only one grouphead, while popular professional machines, such as those used at commercial coffee shops, can contain anywhere from one to seven. During the process of extracting a shot of espresso, hot water is forced through the grouphead under pressure. The grouphead contains many holes (the shower) that attempt to distribute the pressurised water evenly over the surface of the grinds in the portafilter basket and thereby achieve an even cross sectional flow.

A portafilter (or group handle) attaches to the grouphead of semi-automatic and piston-driven espresso machines, and carries a tamped puck of coffee grounds within its basket. It is usually made of brass for better heat retention, and is attached by a plastic or wooden handle. The portafilter forms a seal with the espresso machine's gasket, and directs high-pressure hot water through the coffee puck. After-market retailers also sell bottomless portafilters that minimize the espresso's contact with any metal. A bottomless portafilter is one tool baristas use to analyze the quality of the coffee grind and the evenness of the extraction and allows for a visual check of "channeling" or the condition in which water is able to pierce a hole in the espresso puck during the brew process leading to poor extraction. Often, baristas use knockboxes to store their spent espresso grounds after they have pulled a shot.

== See also ==
- Coffeemaker
- Coffee wars
- Coffee vending machine

== Sources ==
- Bersten, Ian (1993). Coffee Floats, Tea Sinks: Through History and Technology to a Complete Understanding. Helian Books. ISBN 0646091808.
