= Uptown Espresso =

Coffee shop chain in Seattle, Washington, U.S.

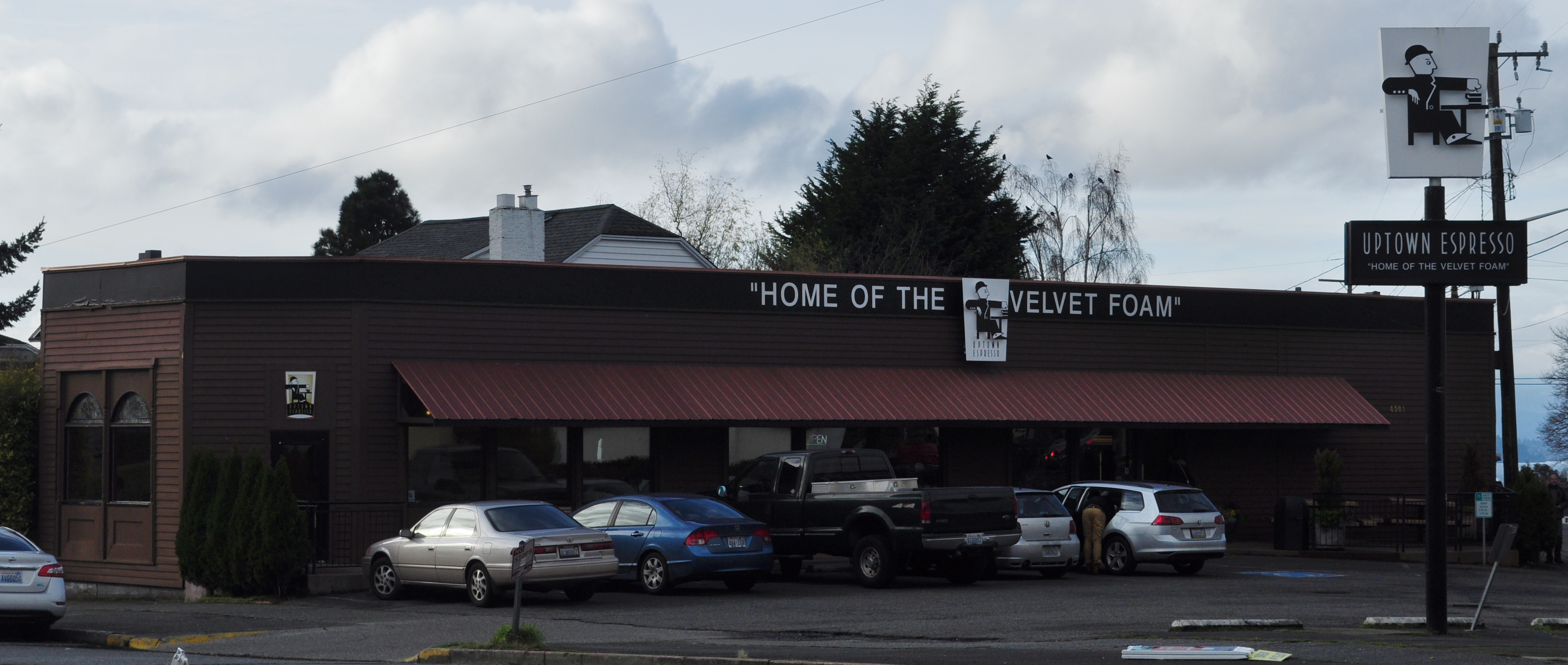
- Uptown Espresso on west side of California Avenue SW, 2015

Restaurant information
- Location: Seattle, King, Washington, United States
- Website: uptownespresso.com

Uptown Espresso is a small chain of coffee shops in Seattle, Washington, United States. The original location opened in Lower Queen Anne in 1984 and has had as many as eight locations. It is known for its velvet foam, which has been described as a whipped microfoam. The business' original owner Jack Kelly has been credited for inspiring David Schomer of Espresso Vivace to used "textured" milk. Uptown Espresso's menu also includes breakfast burritos and pastries.

== History and locations ==
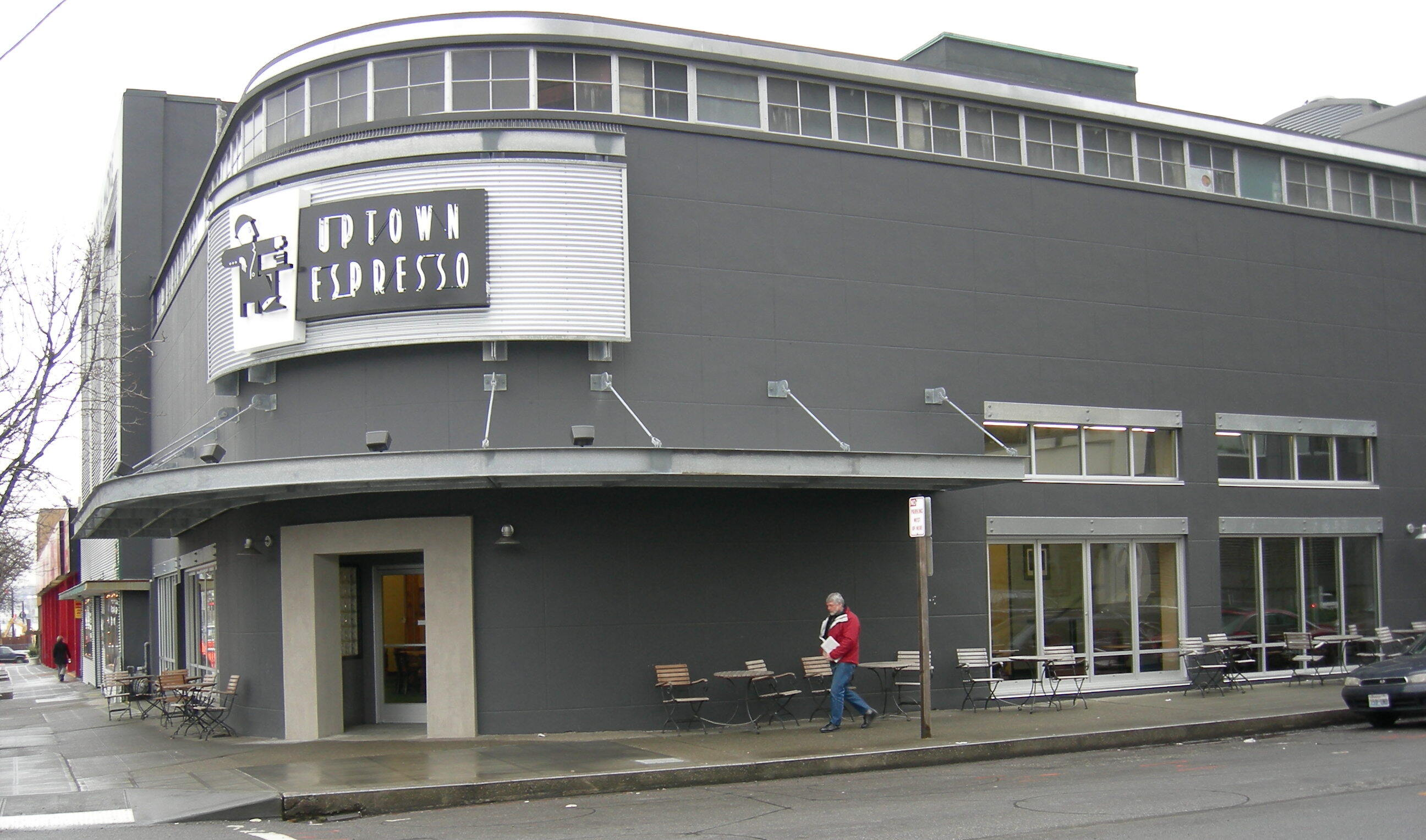
Uptown Espresso on Westlake, South Lake Union, 2007

Jack Kelly was the original owner. Dow Lucurell was later an owner.

In addition to the original location in Lower Queen Anne, the business has also operated at Pier 70 (Central Waterfront) and in Belltown, Magnolia, and West Seattle. Uptown Espresso has operated in South Lake Union since 2004. The business was sold to Fonté Coffee Roasters in 2019, following Lucurell's death in 2018.

Uptown Espresso was among Seattle's largest independent coffeehouse chains in 2004. The original location closed permanently in 2021. The Pier 70 location closed in 2022. In December 2025, plans were announced to close the Delridge location in West Seattle permanently.

== Reception ==
The Seattle Times has described Uptown Espresso as "casual yet urban". The Not for Tourists Guide to Seattle has said: "Self-proclaimed 'Home of the Velvet Foam', but the coffee underneath is just so-so." Naomi Tomky, Allecia Vermillion, and Darren Davis included Uptown Espresso in Seattle Metropolitan's 2026 overview of the city's best coffee shops.

== See also ==
- List of coffee companies
- List of coffeehouse chains
- List of restaurant chains in the United States
