= Rancilio =

Italian espresso machine manufacturer

Coordinates: 45°31′51″N 8°56′45″E

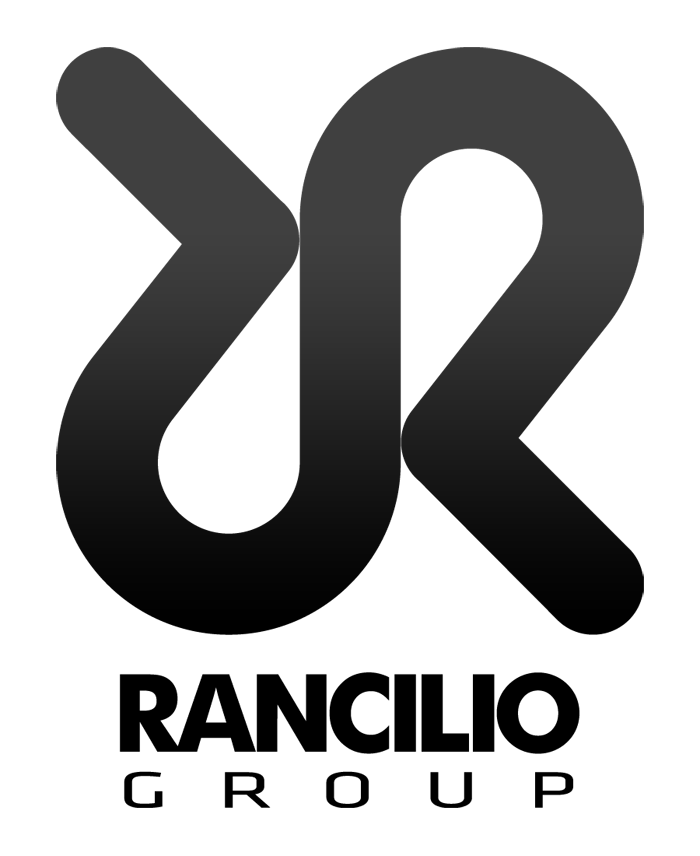
- Company type: Private
- Industry: Domestic & Professional Espresso machines
- Founded: Parabiago, Italy, 1927; 99 years ago
- Founder: Roberto Rancilio
- Headquarters: Parabiago, Italy
- Area served: Worldwide
- Products: Espresso Machines
- Website: www.ranciliogroup.com

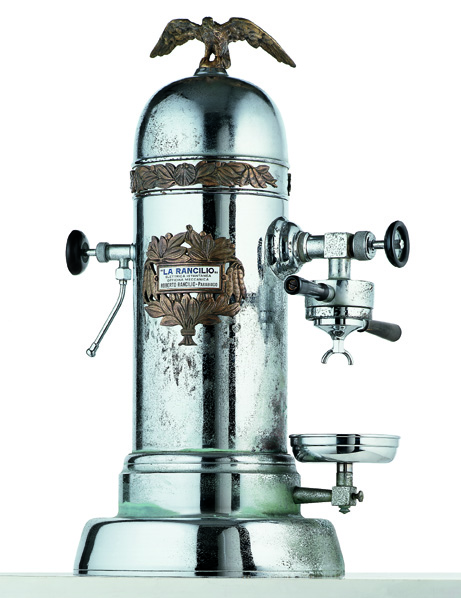
Rancilio La Regina, 1927

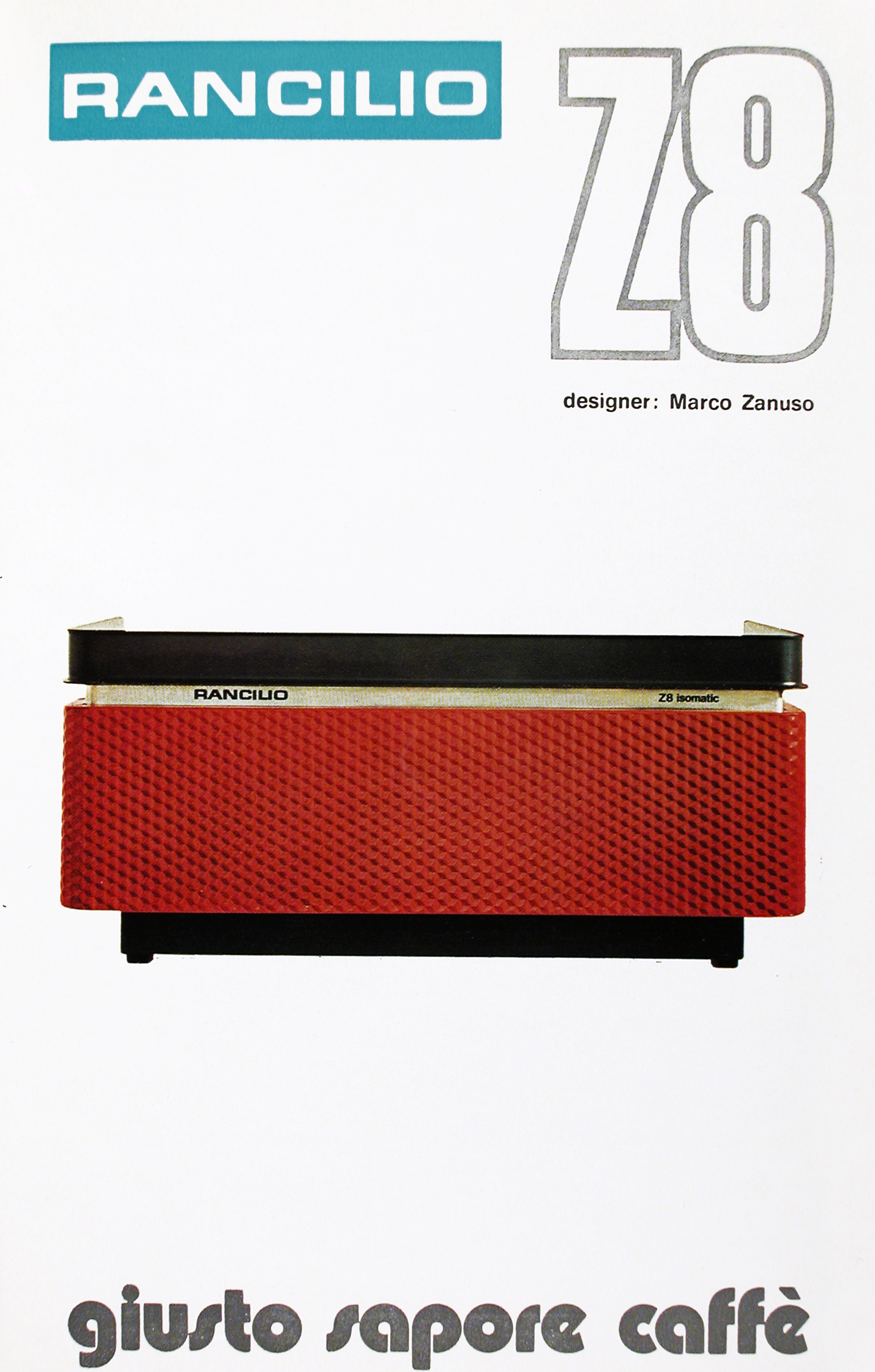
Rancilio Z8, 1971

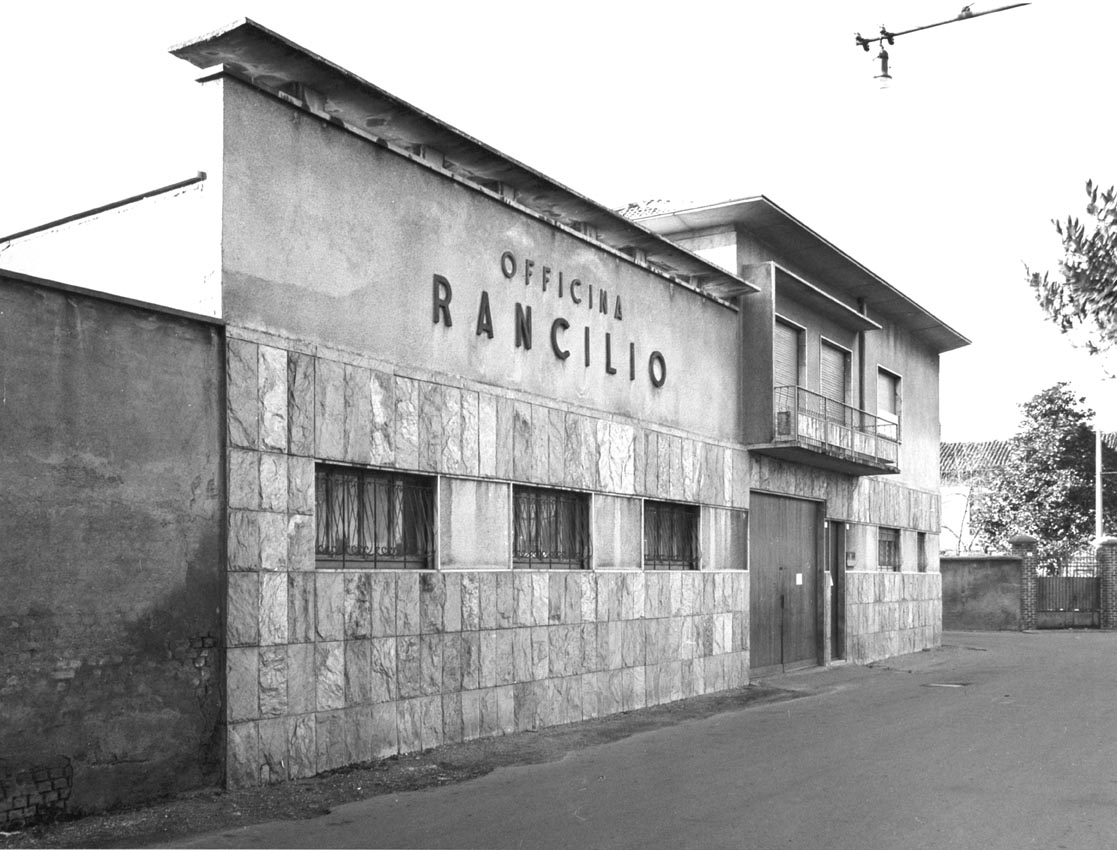
Rancilio Offices, Parabiago, c. 1950s

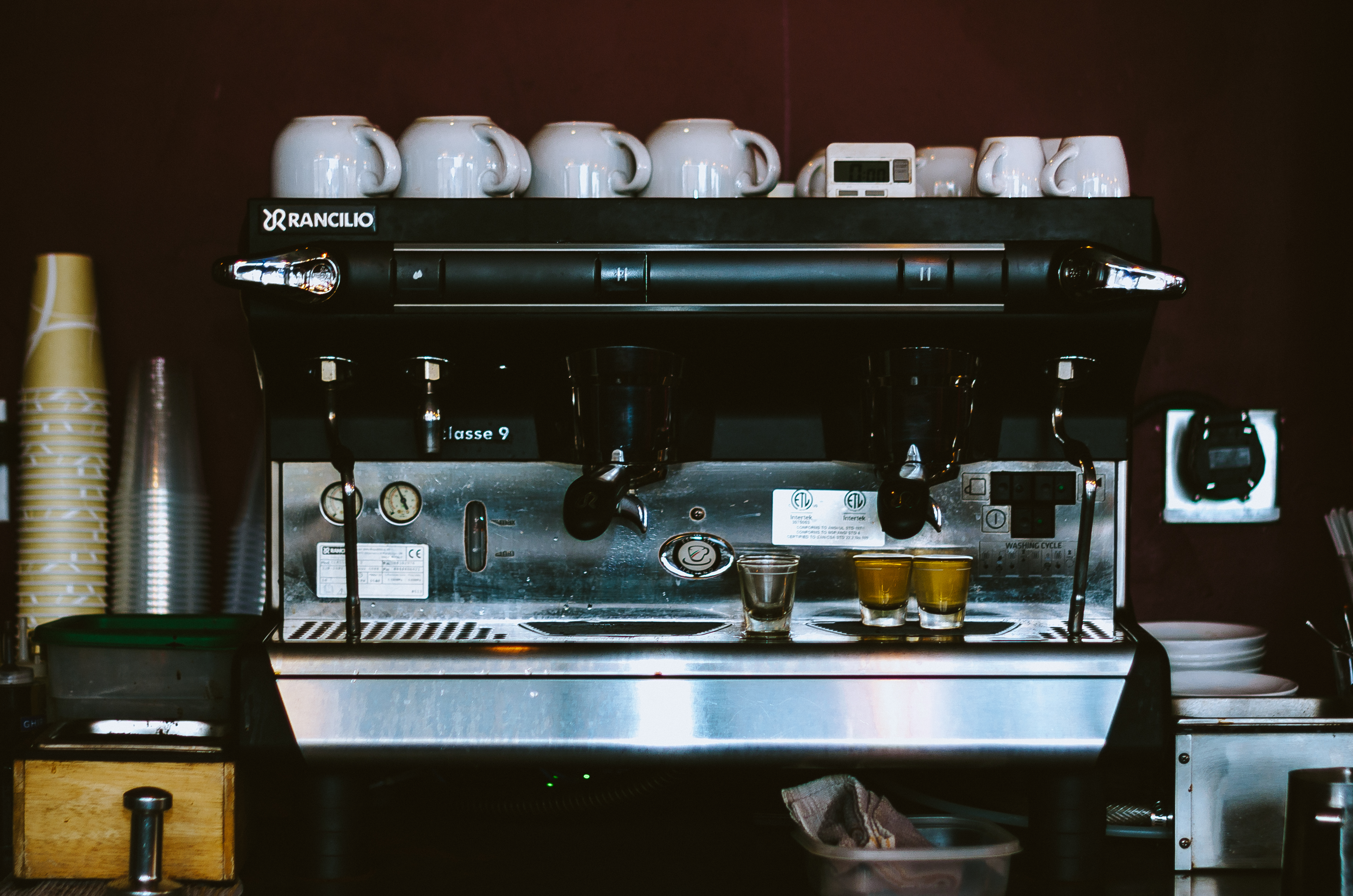
Rancilio Classe 9 2-group commercial semi-automatic espresso machine, 2015

Rancilio is an Italian manufacturer best known for its espresso equipment, founded in 1927 by Roberto Rancilio in Parabiago, Italy, near Milan.

The company produces appliances for commercial and domestic use, especially espresso machines and coffee grinders, which it distributes worldwide.

== History ==
Rancilio's earliest espresso machine was La Regina: a steam-driven vertical boiler model, similar to the original Bezzera, Gaggia, and Victoria Arduino machines in function and gilded Belle Époque styling.

In 1950, Rancilio released a horizontal boiler machine, the Invicta Horizzontal, showing evidence of the postwar shift toward spare, modern styling. The machine however, still used the same forced-steam brewing method from the early 20th century. By 1953, Rancilio adopted lever piston technology introduced by Gaggia. In 1957, Rancilio released a model which automated the lever process, the H/L Automatica. The company followed new technological trends towards continuous deliver brewing introduced by Faema in 1961.

In 1965, Rancilio commissioned design work from industrial designer Marco Zanuso, beginning with the Rancilio Z8, and continuing with the Z9 in 1974. Rancilio continued with several Z-series machines, with the Z11 being the last. The S-series machine would become popular in the 1990s, and become well known in the North American marketplace.

Rancilio entered the home espresso market in 1989 with the release of its Miss Rancilio line, featuring the Audrey espresso machine and the Rocky grinder with distinctively curved white plastic casings. The Audrey was equipped with a 300ml brass boiler, a three-way solenoid valve, an ULKA vibratory pump, and a commercial 58mm brass group and portafilter, and the Rocky with a 50mm Mazzer flat burr set and stepped grind size adjustment. The Rocky in particular is regarded as "revolutionary" in home espresso, becoming the standard home grinder "for the serious espresso nerd" through the next decade.

Variations of the Audrey were also sold under the names Rialto and Nancy, often with the honorific 'Miss' applied, e.g. "Miss Audrey," and sometimes with contradictory model labels. Some models in this series had Teflon-coated boilers and portafilters.

Rancilio later introduced the Miss Kathy model, incorporating the components and functionality of both an Audrey espresso machine and a Rocky grinder in a single chassis. Later versions of this integrated espresso machine were named Miss Lucy.

In 1997, Rancilio created a home kitchen-sized espresso machine based on their commercial offerings. This was initially only available as a thank-you gift to importers and vendors of Rancilio's restaurant-grade coffee machines. This machine was later sold to consumers as the Silvia. The Silvia is a one group machine with a vibratory pump from ULKA and a single brass boiler that's controlled by 3 thermostats for both steam and hot water. It is frequently sold with its companion Rocky grinder that is available in doserless and dosered models with stepped settings.

Rancilio began collaborating with McDonald's in 2000, partnering in the development of the latter's McCafé initiative.

In 2001, Rancilio revamped their lineup, introducing the basic Epoca, and the Classe series. In 2011, they introduced a new advanced brewing system for the Classe 9 called Xcelsius, which gives precise control of water temperature during the brewing cycle.

Rancilio made an attempt at a super-automatic machine, the Classe 12, and used cafes in Borders bookstores as a test market. It was deemed a failure, recalled, and abandoned. They subsequently purchased the Swiss Egro brand of super-automatic machines and have built a presence in that market with their Egro One.

In October 2013 Rancilio was acquired by Ali group.

In 2022, Rancilio introduced the Stile home grinder, featuring 58mm Fiorenzato flat burrs and digital controls; the Rocky grinder is still available.

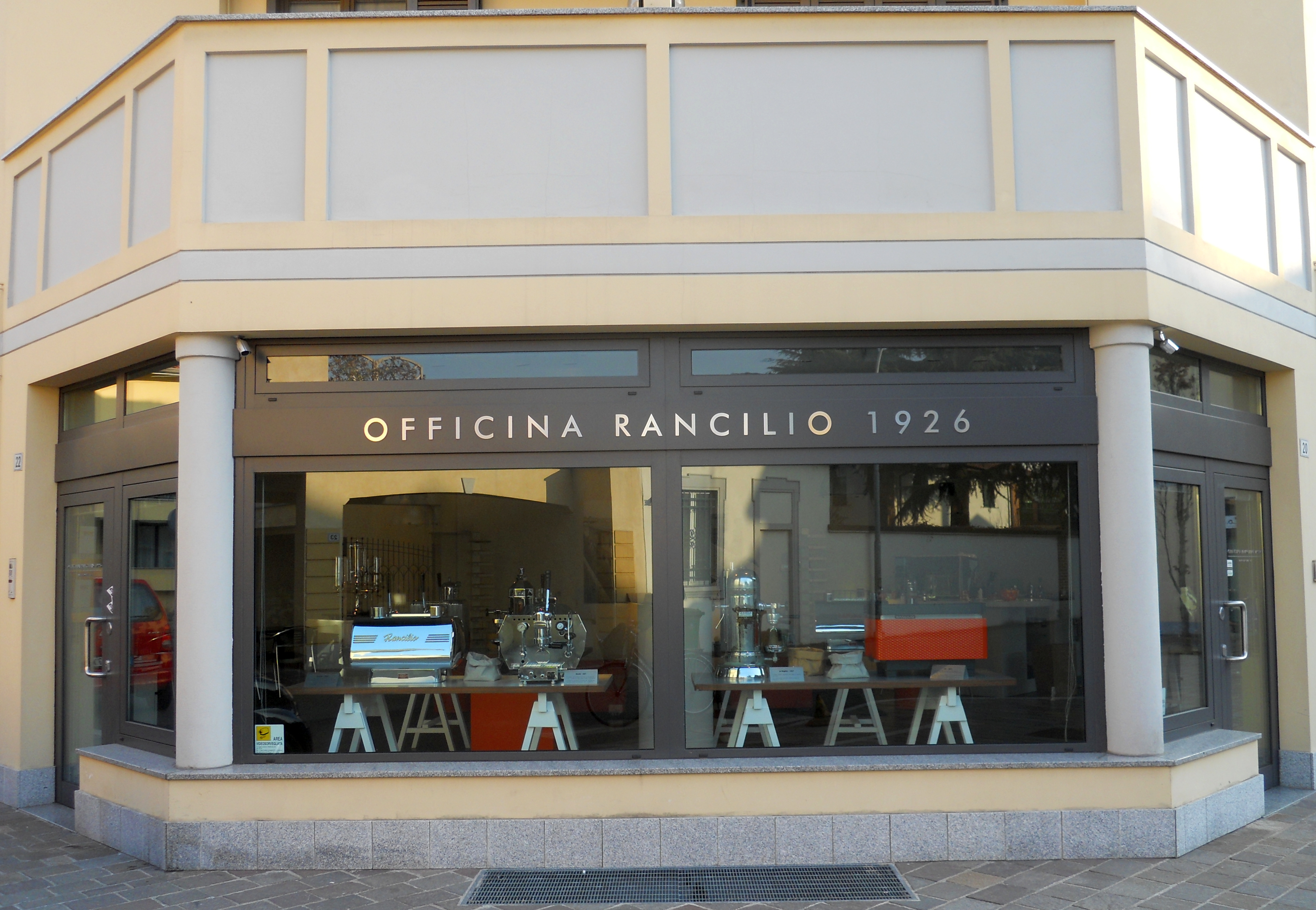
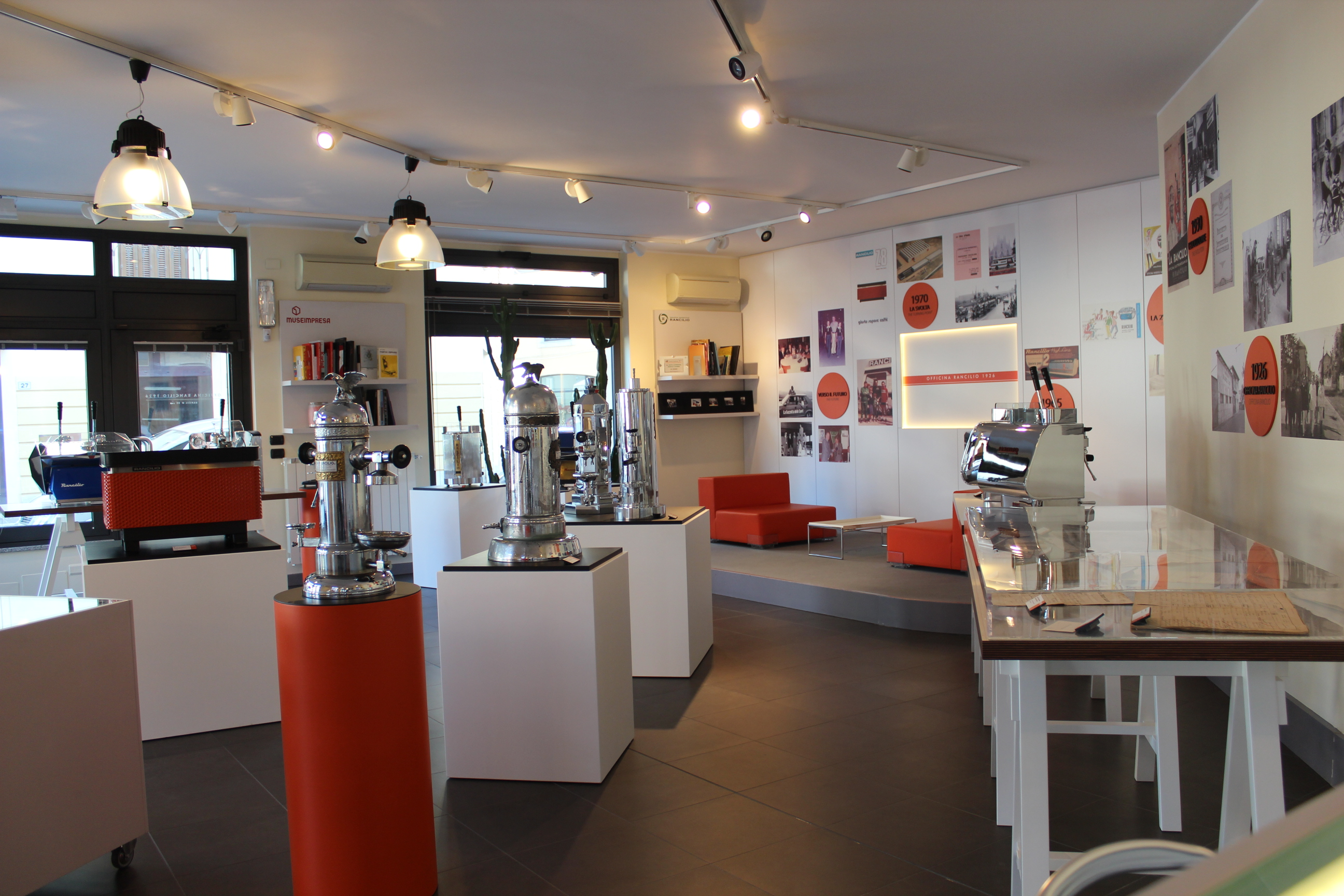
Museo Officina Rancilio 1926, Parabiago, exterior (2012) and interior (2016)

== Rancilio Silvia ==
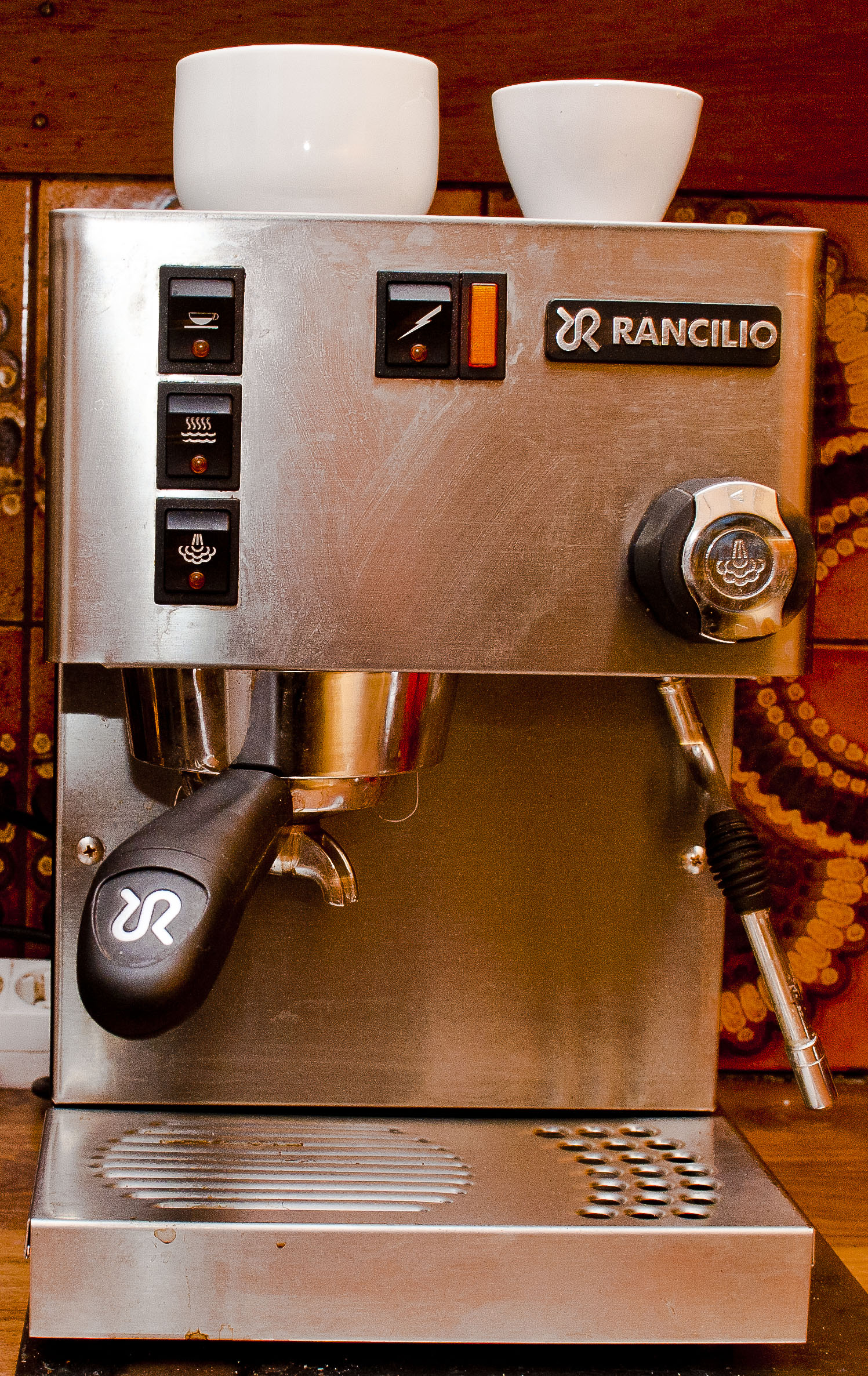
RANCILIO SILVIA espresso machine

External images
- Visual comparison of Rancilio Silvia versions V1, V2, and V3 (Avi Schneor)
- Photograph of V3 (left) and V1/V2 (right) steam wand/valve assemblies

The Rancilio Silvia (officially "Miss Silvia") is a semi-automatic espresso machine manufactured by Rancilio since 1997. James Hoffmann suggests that the Silvia marks the beginning of the "prosumer category" in espresso, representing "miniature commercial machines for the home," and characterizes the Silvia as "the closest to a commercial machine" available among consumer espresso machines. Mark Frauenfelder concurs, noting that the Silvia "shares many characteristics of commercial equipment — robustness and repairability being chief among them." He describes the Silvia as "the most well-documented espresso maker in history, thanks to its legion of hacker fans," and devotes an entire chapter, "Tickling Miss Silvia," to the machine. Hoffmann agrees, observing that the Silvia is "probably the most modified domestic espresso machine in the world." The Silvia is regarded as "an icon in the home coffee market," "a classic" in the espresso community, and "perhaps the most famous domestic espresso machine on the market," to the point of being recognised as a potential "coffee cliché."

The Silvia placed components of the Audrey into a much heavier steel chassis, finished with a rectangular brushed stainless steel case and drip tray cover, and a cylindrical brushed steel collar covering the brass grouphead. (The Silvia may thus be understood as an example of old wine in a new bottle.) As a result, the Silvia weighs 14 kilograms (31 lb), more than 50% more than its ancestor Audrey's 9 kilograms (20 lb). Hoffmann describes the Silvia as "built like an absolute tank," and exceptionally stable in countertop operation. Matte black rocker switches replaced the translucent orange, fully illuminated switches on prior Miss Rancilio machines, completing the Silvia's visual design.

As the Silvia evolved, online communities began to assign informal version control numbers to denote changes in features relative to production date. (There is no evidence that Rancilio uses or acknowledges these version numbers; they have, however, been employed in peer-reviewed scientific literature.) The initial release of the Silvia subsequently became known as V1.

The production date for each Silvia machine is typically printed as a four-digit code in the bottom-right corner of the manufacturer's sticker concealed beneath the drip tray, or, on some early models, on the bottom of the machine body. The first two digits of this code are the production month, and the second two digits are the production year, such that "0506" would denote a Silvia manufactured in May 2006. The general references for the following version history the Silvia are Avi Schneor's introduction to his SchneorDesign Rancilio Silvia Mega-Mod project and the KaffeeWiki guide to Rancilio Silvia's differences in production series.

=== V1 (1997-July 2006) ===
Even within what is generally referred to as the first version of the Silvia, Rancilio did make some alterations. Early V1 machines have a Rancilio logo printed in black on the front of the case; later models have a thick plastic badge attached to the case in the same location. In May 2000, a change was made to the design of the Silvia's boiler, which incidentally accommodates user installation of a PID controller to manage boiler temperature; machines made in April 2000 and earlier have an earlier version of the boiler. In 2002, the boiler design was revised once more, replacing the threaded, replaceable stainless steel heating element with a copper element soldered to the upper half of the boiler.

=== V2 (August 2006-early 2008) ===
In August 2006, Rancilio introduced significant changes to the Silvia. The boiler design was revised again, replacing the cast brass connections for steam and water pipes with threaded connections. Rancilio also changed the design of the overpressure valve (OPV) which regulates pressure between the pump and the grouphead. The V1 OPV could only be adjusted to reduce brew pressure by adding washers between the single 20mm nut and the OPV body. The V2 OPV had two 20mm nuts, which could be more easily adjusted to raise and lower brew pressure. The now defunct (but archived) website PIDSilvia described methods both for adding a pressure gauge to the Silvia (among many other useful guides) and for measuring the effective brew pressure without such a manometer, by comparing the flow rate from the OPV through the overflow tube to the pressure/flow curve for the machine's ULKA vibratory pump. Instead of the cylindrical brushed steel grouphead cover of the V1, the V2 grouphead was insulated with a conical plastic collar covered in a silver chrome film. Rancilio also replaced the uniformly perforated drip tray cover of the V1 with a new design, which placed a circular array of angled slots under the grouphead, and two curved columns of holes under the steam wand. V2 retained the V1 ribbed black plastic portafilter handle and steam knob, and the 6mm diameter steam wand with hexagonal tip, attached to the machine by a simple swivel joint. In mid-2007, Rancilio changed the Silvia from a 110 °C (230 °F) brew thermostat to a 100 °C (212 °F) brew thermostat. (While this is not considered a separate version, the change did make a significant improvement in the Silvia's thermal management and brew quality.)

=== V3 (2008-2013) ===
In mid-2008, Rancilio made another significant improvement to the Silvia design, completing the basis for all subsequent models. (Some Silvias made in early 2008 are still V2.) The machine was upgraded with a thicker 10mm diameter commercial-grade steam wand with a single-hole tip, attached to the machine by an articulating ball joint that allowed the steam wand to tilt in all directions as well as swivel. The V3 steam wand greatly increased the Silvia's ability to heat and texture milk (or non-dairy milk) to produce the microfoam necessary for proper latte art. In his 2020 survey of "The Best Espresso Machine Under £500," James Hoffmann characterized the Silvia's steam power as "a beast... the closest to steaming with a commercial steam wand" available in a consumer espresso machine, and both "incredibly quick and incredibly powerful" in producing microfoam and bringing the milk up to temperature. In his testing, the Silvia was able to steam 150 grams of refrigerated milk to microfoam at 60 °C (140 °F) in just 21 seconds, half the time required by the contemporary Gaggia Classic Pro (2019) in the same test (42 seconds). To complement the new steam wand, Rancilio also added a new partially chrome steam valve knob. Both parts were made available in an aftermarket 'Pro Kit' sold by Rancilio, allowing service centers and capable end users to upgrade V2 and V1 Silvias.

=== V4 (2013-2016) ===
An internal update, revising the boiler design to make the copper heating element removable and replaceable, similar to the V1 Silvia. V4 is otherwise identical to V3.

=== V5 (2016-2020) ===
A moderate update, adding insulation to the boiler and revising the power switch, adding a second round LED to indicate both machine power and heating element activity, replacing the vertical bar light alongside the power switch on prior models dating back to the Audrey. Rancilio also introduced the first official distinction in the Silvia line: between the Silvia M, otherwise identical to V3 and V4, and the Silvia E, which adds a standby mode that deactivates the boiler's heating element after 30 minutes without user interaction, for compliance with European Union energy regulations.

=== V6 (2020-present) ===
A minor update: the steam wand was slightly streamlined, eliminating the small lip in V3 and later models, making the wand easier to wipe down. Rancilio also offered a new color option, "Silva Black," for an additional fee, with a matte case to match the new black grouphead cover. V6 is otherwise identical to V3, V4, and V5.

=== Silvia Pro (2020-present) ===
In the Silvia's third decade, Rancilio introduced a new, larger version of the machine. The Silvia Pro is a dual boiler machine, with the same 300cc brew boiler as the regular Silvia alongside a dedicated 1000cc steam boiler, allowing users to steam milk while simultaneously pulling a shot of espresso. Instead of the mechanical thermostats on the Silvia, both boilers on the Silvia Pro are PID controller. The Pro also adds a shot-time display, and a timer to wake up and shut down the machine. As a result of these additions, especially the added steam boiler, the Silvia Pro has a larger footprint than the Silvia, is notably taller, and about 50% heavier.

=== Silvia Pro X (2021-present) ===
The following year, Rancilio introduced a more expensive version of the Silvia Pro, adding a brew pressure gauge, a variable "soft infusion" feature to control brew pressure during extraction, a new portafilter handle (based on the Rancilio RS-1), and a range of color options: matte blank, matte white, matte pink, and the traditional Silvia brushed stainless steel.

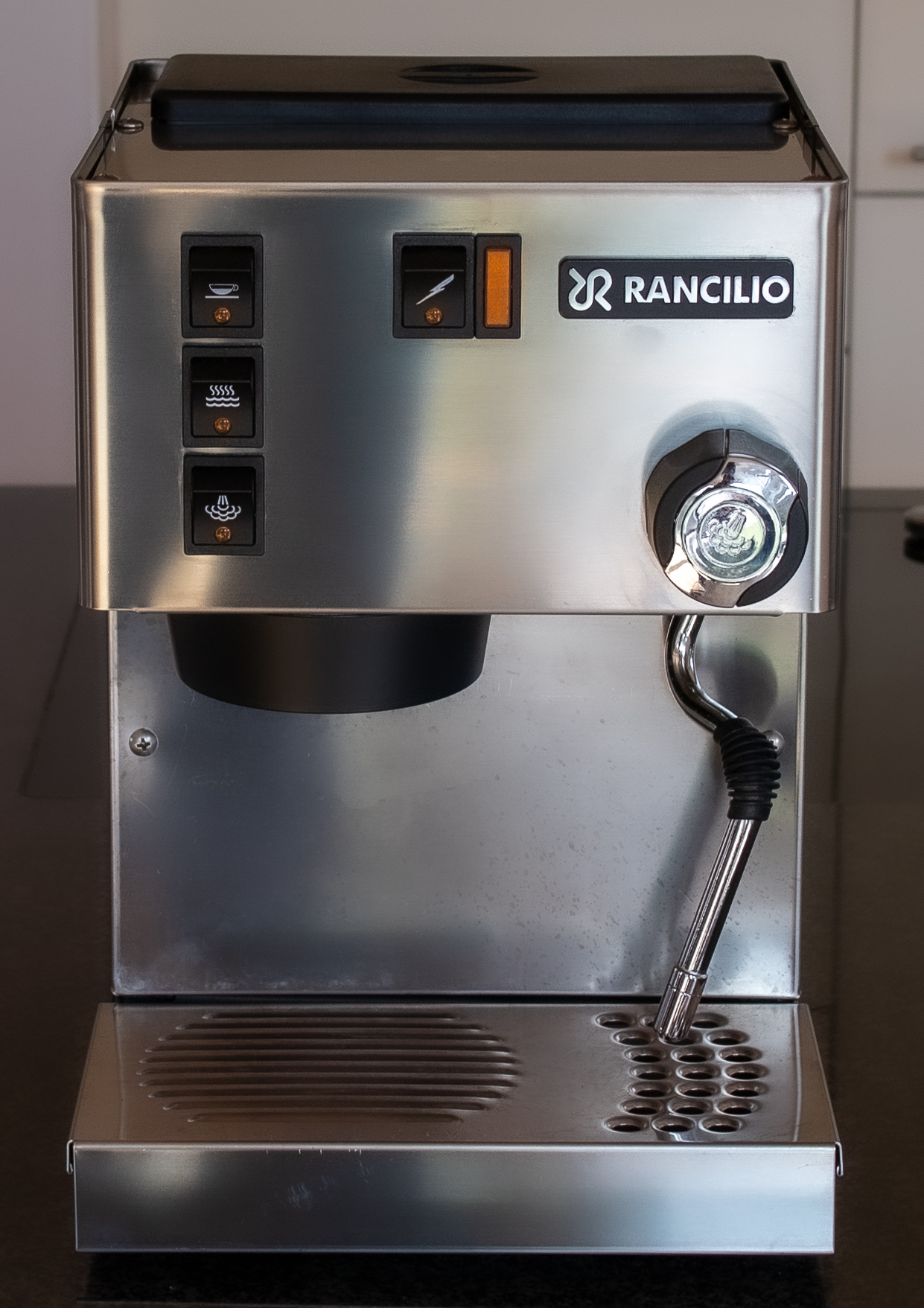
Silvia V4 (09/2013) with V6 (2020) matte black grouphead cover

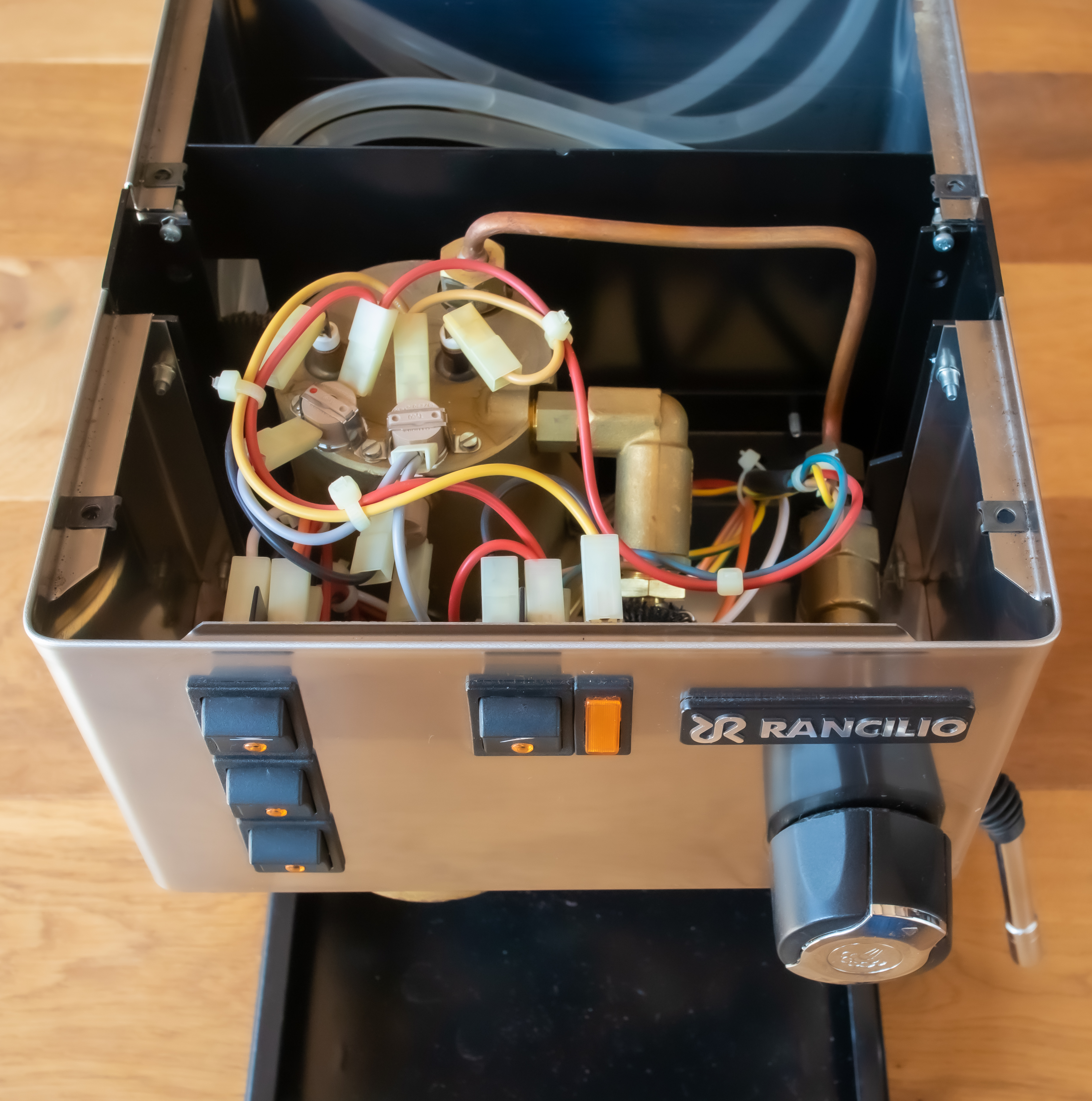
Silvia V4 (09/2013) top cover removed

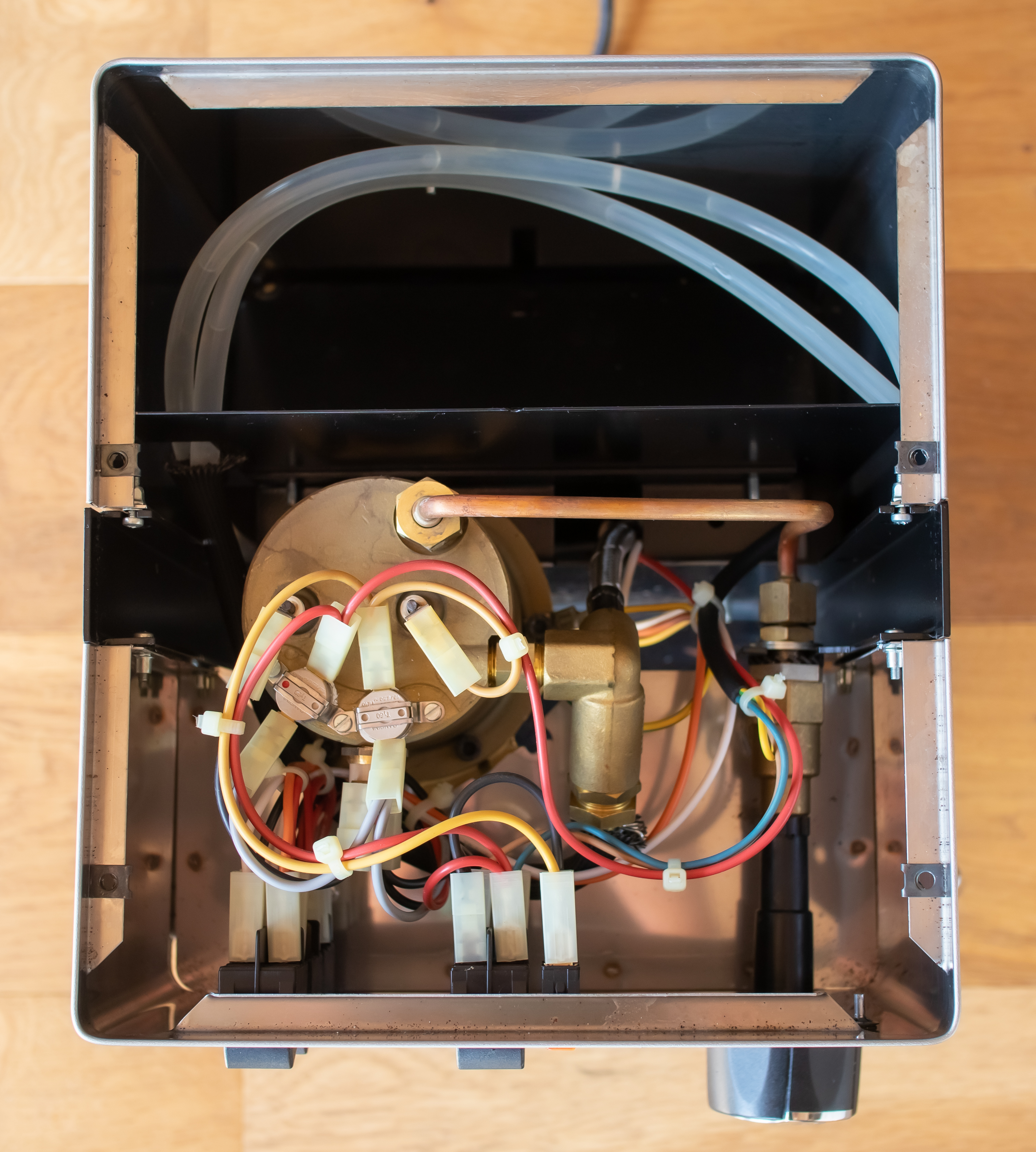
Silvia V4 (09/2013) overhead internal

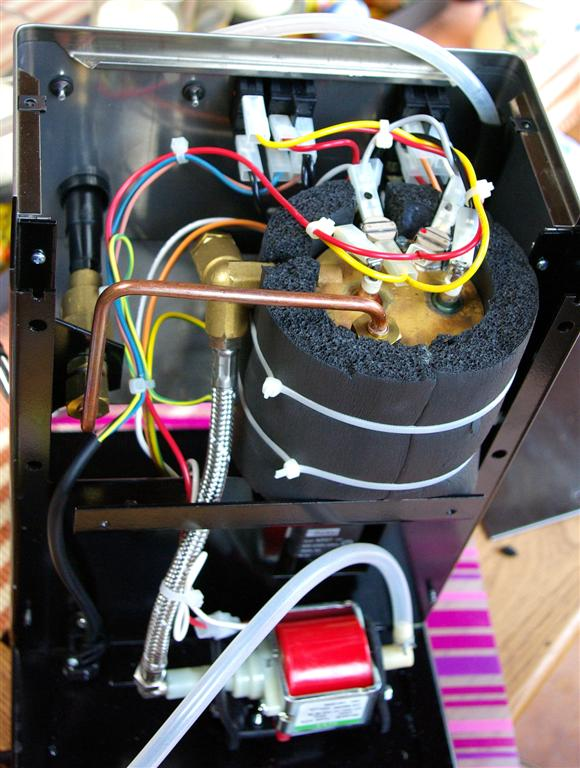
Rear case and water tank removed to show pump mounting and modded boiler insulation (fastened with zip ties) similar to V5

== Museum ==
In October 2010, the Rancilio family, in partnership with the Rancilio Group, opened the Museo Officina Rancilio 1926 as the official museum of Rancilio coffee machines. The museum is located in Parabiago, via Don Galeazzi 18-22, and is modelled on the original offices of Roberto Rancilio.

The museum displays machines produced by Rancilio from 1927 to 1980, including La Regina (1927), La Ducale (1957), Z8 (1971), and Z9 (1974).

== See also ==
- Bialetti
- Cimbali
- De'Longhi
- Elektra (espresso machines)
- Faema
- FrancisFrancis
- Gaggia
- La Marzocco
- La Pavoni
- Lelit
- Saeco
- List of Italian companies
