= Cappuccino =

Drink made with espresso coffee and steamed milk

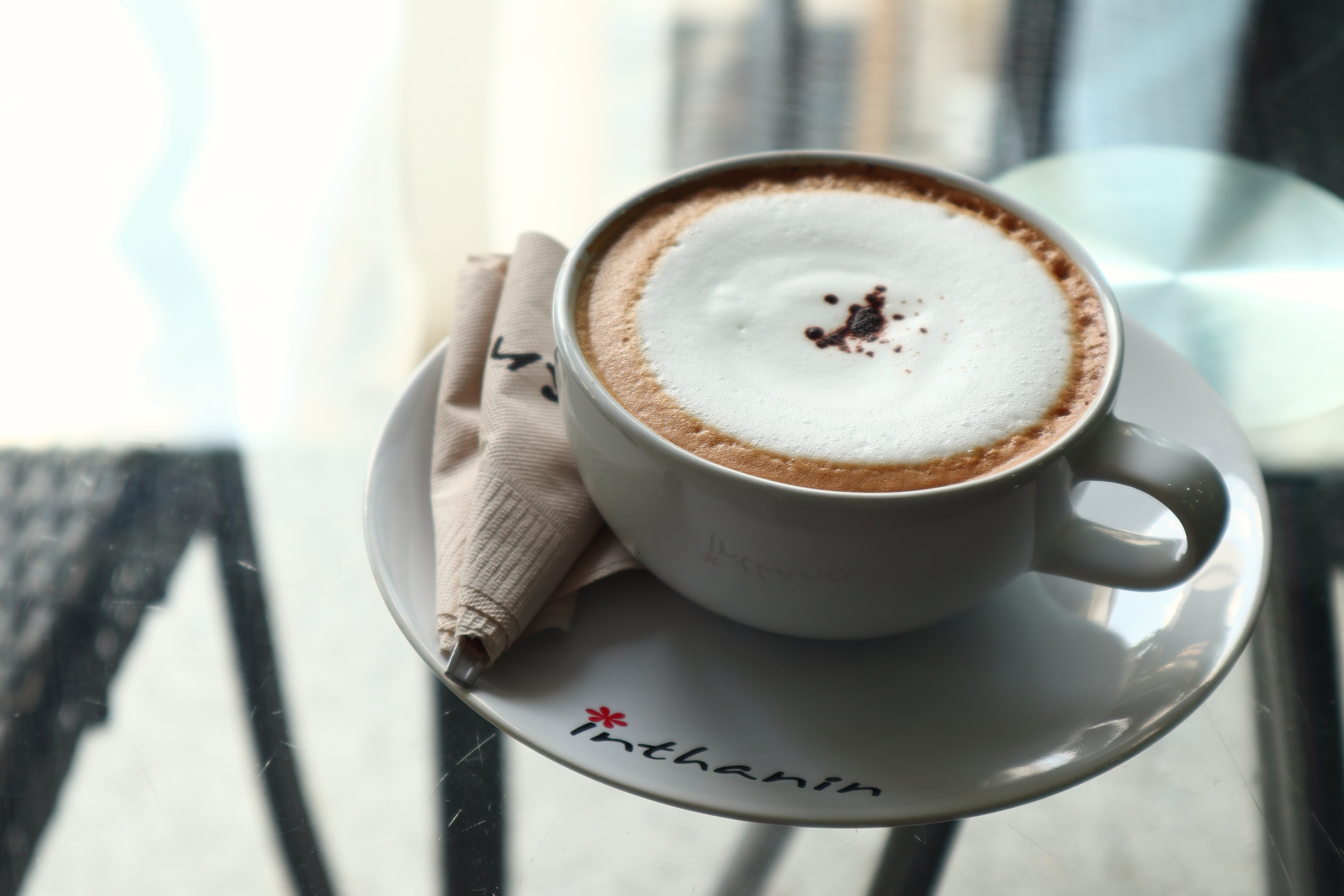
- A cappuccino served in the appropriate cup
- Origin: Italy
- Introduced: Late 18th century
- Color: Light brown, dark brown, beige, white, black

Cappuccino (/ˌkæpʊˈtʃiːnoʊ/, Italian: [kapputˈtʃiːno]) is an espresso-based coffee drink traditionally prepared with steamed milk, including a layer of milk foam.

Variations of the drink involve the use of cream instead of milk, using non-dairy milk substitutes and flavoring with cocoa powder (in Europe and Australasia) or cinnamon (in the United States and South Korea). It is typically smaller in volume than that of a caffè latte, and topped with a thick layer of macrofoam rather than being made with microfoam.

The name comes from the Capuchin friars, referring to the color of their habits, and in this context, referring to the color of the beverage when milk is added in small portions to dark, brewed coffee (today mostly espresso). The physical appearance of a modern cappuccino with espresso crema and steamed milk is a result of a long evolution of the drink.

The Viennese bestowed the name Kapuziner, possibly in the 18th century, on an early version that included whipped cream and spices. Later, the Kapuziner was introduced in northern Italy during the period of Austrian domination, and Italians started to use it for the beverage as well as the friar dress. It is sometimes said to have been served in the coffeehouses of Trieste and other Italian areas of the Austro-Hungarian Empire in the early 20th century, spreading throughout the Kingdom of Italy after World War I. However, the existence in central Italy of a coffee drink mixed with milk named cappuccino is already documented in the 19th century.

== Definitions and etymology ==
=== Definitions ===
A cappuccino is a coffee drink that today is typically composed of a single, double, or triple espresso shot and hot milk, with the surface topped with foamed milk.

In a cappuccino, as served in Europe and the United States, the total of espresso and milk/foam make up between approximately 150 and 180 ml (5 and 6 imp fl oz; 5 and 6 US fl oz). Commercial coffee restaurant chains in the US more often serve the cappuccino as a 360 ml (13 imp fl oz; 12 US fl oz) drink or larger. In Italy, a cappuccino consists of 25 ml (1 imp fl oz; 1 US fl oz) of espresso; the rest of the cup is filled with equal parts of milk and foam.

A cappuccino is traditionally served in a small cup with a handle (180 ml maximum) with a thick layer of foam, while a caffè latte is espresso and milk (200–300 ml), with the milk steamed to be hot and to form microfoam, and is usually served in a large glass.

The World Barista Championships have been arranged annually since 2000, and during the course of the competition, the competing barista must produce—for four sensory judges—among other drinks four cappuccinos, defined in WBC Rules and Regulations as "[...] a coffee and milk beverage that should produce a harmonious balance of rich, sweet milk and espresso [...] The cappuccino is prepared with one (1) single shot of espresso, textured milk and foam ("textured milk" is milk that has been aerated to its proper foam level). A minimum of 1 centimeter of foam depth [...] A cappuccino is a beverage between 150 ml and 180 ml in total volume [...]."

=== Etymology ===
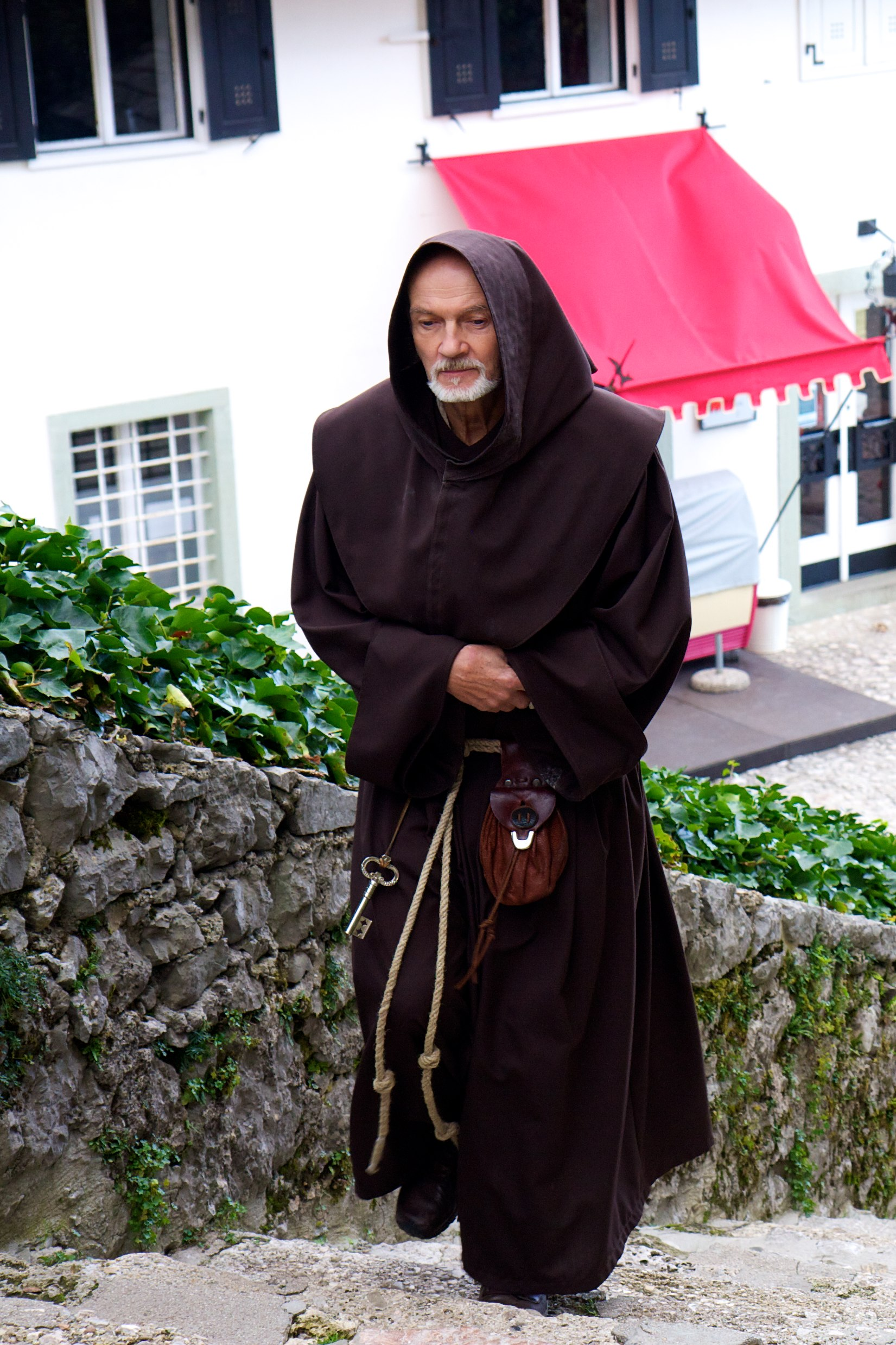
The robe worn by the Capuchin order, which inspired the name of the coffee drink

The coffee beverage has its name not from the hood but from the color of the hooded robes worn by friars and nuns of the Capuchin order.

Drinks called Kapuziner, consisting of coffee with a few drops of cream, showed up in coffee house menus all over the Habsburg monarchy around the late 1700s, so nicknamed due to the vestments of the Capuchin friars, commonly seen in Vienna, sharing the same color as the drink.

The word cappuccino, in its Italian form, appears in Italian writings in the 19th century and is described as "black coffee with a few drops of milk or cream which give it the color the tunic of the Capuchins, from which it takes its name".

== History and evolution ==
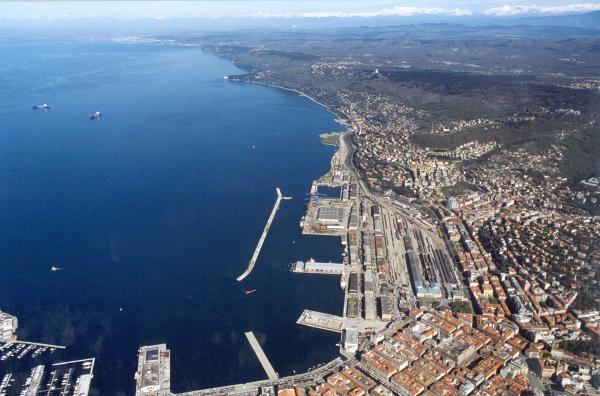
The old port of Trieste, where most of the coffee for Central Europe was handled for a long time and from where the cappuccino spread

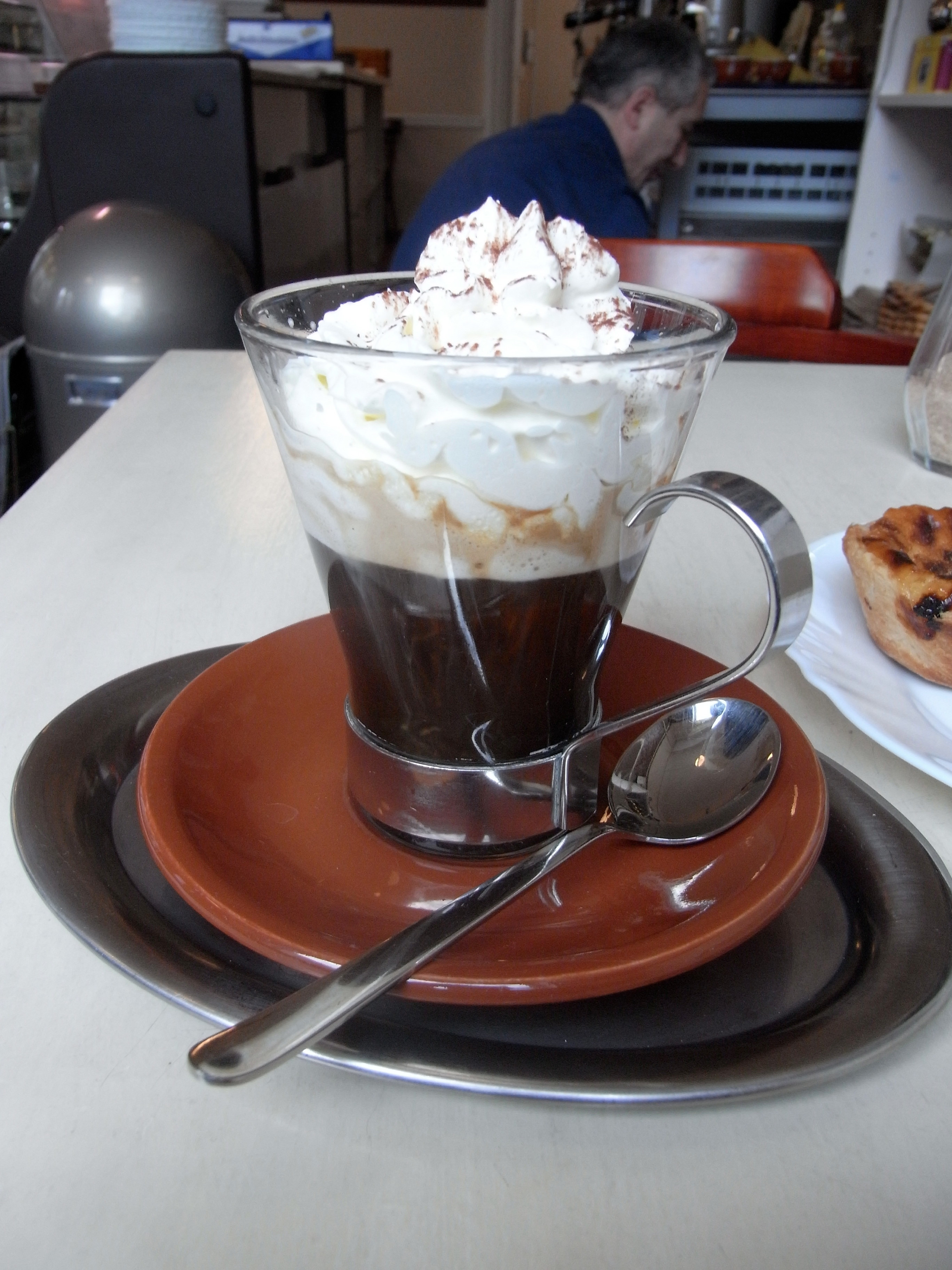
Kapuziner coffee, the forerunner of cappuccino

The consumption of coffee in Europe was initially based on the traditional Ottoman preparation of the drink, by bringing to boil the mixture of coffee and water together, sometimes adding sugar. Adding milk to coffee was mentioned by Europeans as early as the 1700s, while the British already started filtering and steeping coffee in the second half of the 18th century.

Kapuziner showed up in coffee house menus all over the Habsburg monarchy around the late 1700s.

Kapuziner took its name from the brown color of coffee with a few drops of cream, so nicknamed because the Capuchin friars in Vienna and elsewhere wore vestments of this color. Another popular coffee was Franziskaner, with more cream, referring to the somewhat lighter brown of the tunics of the Franciscan order. Kapuziner coffee spread throughout Central Europe, including the Italian-speaking parts of the Habsburg monarchy. The main port of the empire, the city of Trieste, already had many Viennese coffee houses. According to a popular but unverified legend, cappuccino was named after the Italian Capuchin friar Marco d'Aviano, who contributed to the victory of the Battle of Vienna.

The use of fresh milk in coffee in cafés and restaurants is a newer phenomenon (from the 20th century), introduced when refrigeration became common. The use of full cream is known much further back in time (but not in the use as whipped cream [chantilly]), as this was a product more easily stored and frequently used also in cooking and baking. Thus, a Kapuziner was prepared with a very small amount of cream to get the capuchin color. Today, Kapuziner is still served in Viennese traditional cafés, comprising still black coffee with only a few drops of cream (in some establishments developed into a dollop of whipped cream), or frothed milk instead of cream.

Cappuccino as written today (in Italian) is first mentioned in the 19th century and is described as "black coffee with a few drops of milk or cream". The modern Italian cappuccino evolved and developed in the following decades: the steamed milk on top is a later addition, and in the US a slight misunderstanding has led to the naming of this "cap" of milk foam "monk's head", although it originally had nothing to do with the name of the beverage.

Espresso machines were introduced at the beginning of the 20th century.

In the United Kingdom, espresso coffee initially gained popularity in the form of cappuccino, influenced by the British custom of drinking coffee with milk, the desire for a longer drink to preserve the café as a destination, and the exotic texture of the beverage.

In the United States, cappuccino spread alongside espresso in Italian American neighborhoods, such as Boston's North End, New York's Little Italy, and San Francisco's North Beach. New York City's Caffe Reggio (founded in 1927) claims to have introduced cappuccino to the United States, while San Francisco's Caffe Trieste (founded in 1956) claims to have introduced it to the west coast; the earlier Tosca Cafe in San Francisco (founded in 1919) served a "cappuccino" earlier, but this was without coffee, and instead consisted of chocolate, steamed milk, and brandy.

== Popularity ==
In Italy and throughout continental Europe, cappuccino is traditionally consumed in the morning, usually as part of breakfast, often with some type of pastry. Italians generally do not drink cappuccino with meals other than breakfast, although they often drink espresso after lunch or dinner. In Italy, cappuccino is usually consumed up to 11:00 am, since cappuccinos are milk-based and considered too heavy to drink later in the day. Instead, espresso is usually ordered after a meal due to the belief that the lack of milk aids in digestion. In North America, cappuccinos have become popular concurrent with the boom in the American coffee industry through the late 1990s and early 2000s, especially in the urban Pacific Northwest. As of 2024, 57% of American adults reported consuming a specialty coffee beverage in the past week, with cappuccino making up 14% of the specialty coffee share. In South Korea, espresso and its variants (cappuccino, latte, and caffè mocha) became popular in 2000.

Cappuccino is traditionally served in 150–180 ml (5–6 imp fl oz; 5–6 US fl oz) cups. By the start of the 21st century, a modified "short-cut" version was being served by fast-food chains in servings up to 600 ml (21 imp fl oz; 20 US fl oz).

== Preparation ==
=== Traditional ===
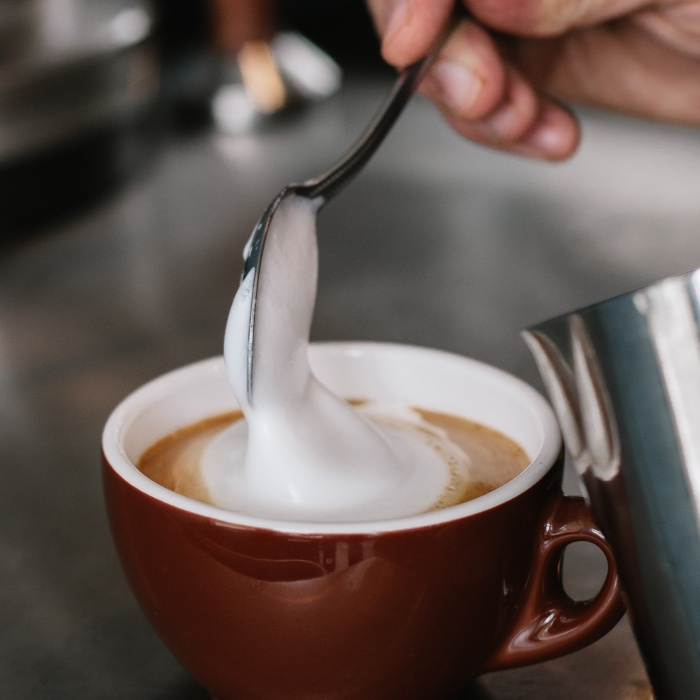
A cappuccino being made

Although size is what varies most among cappuccinos served in different regions, the traditional way of preparing cappuccino is to add equal proportions of the ingredients: 1/3 espresso, 1/3 steamed milk and 1/3 milk foam. Proper milk texturing is considered essential to the beverage, as steaming incorporates microscopic air bubbles that produce a stable, velvety foam while increasing the milk's natural sweetness through lactose perception. Professional barista standards generally recommend steaming milk to about 55–65 °C (131–149 °F) to preserve sweetness and texture while avoiding scalding.

In some countries, a cappuccino is often topped with a dusting of chocolate or cocoa powder; that is the case, among others, in Argentina, Australia, and Brazil.

=== Freddo cappuccino ===
In Greece and Cyprus, a cold cappuccino is widespread known as freddo cappuccino, as opposed to cappuccino freddo. Despite its Italian name, the drink both tastes and is prepared differently from its Italian counterpart, and is uncommon outside of Greece. Freddo cappuccino is topped with a cold milk-based foam known as afrógala (Greek: αφρόγαλα), which is created by blending cold milk using an electric frother. These frothers are commonplace in Greek coffee shops due to their usage during the preparation of frappé coffee. The foam is then added to espresso poured over ice.

Along with the freddo espresso, they were conceived in Greece in 1991 and are in higher demand during summer. Outside Greece and Cyprus, freddo cappuccino or cappuccino freddo is mostly found in coffee shops and delis catering to the Greek expat community. In 2017, Starbucks added cappuccino freddo to branch menus in Europe.

== Similar drinks ==
Other milk and espresso drinks similar to the cappuccino include:

- Macchiato (short for caffè macchiato, sometimes espresso macchiato) is a significantly shorter drink, which consists of espresso with only a small amount of milk.
- Cortado is a Spanish hybrid: a slightly shorter drink, which consists of espresso mixed with milk in a 1:1 to 1:2 ratio, and is not topped with foam. Café cortado has traditionally been served in a small glass on a saucer, and its character comes from the Spanish preference of coffee beans and roast plus condensed milk replacing fresh dairy milk. Modern coffee shops have started using fresh milk.
- Flat white is a drink which is popular in Australia and New Zealand. It can be described either as a latte served in a small cup (like a cappuccino would be), or a cappuccino made with steamed textured milk and with no foam on top ("flat" indicating less foam), and is typically prepared with latte art.
- Latte (short for "caffè latte") is a larger drink, with the same amount of espresso, but with more milk textured to contain microfoam, served in a large cup or tall glass, sometimes with the milk poured to make a pattern (latte art).
- Steamer (or babycino) is a drink of frothed milk without coffee (hence no caffeine). In the United States it often has flavored syrup added, while in Commonwealth countries it instead often has a dusting of cocoa powder.

== See also ==
- List of coffee drinks
