= Latte =

Beverage made with espresso coffee and milk

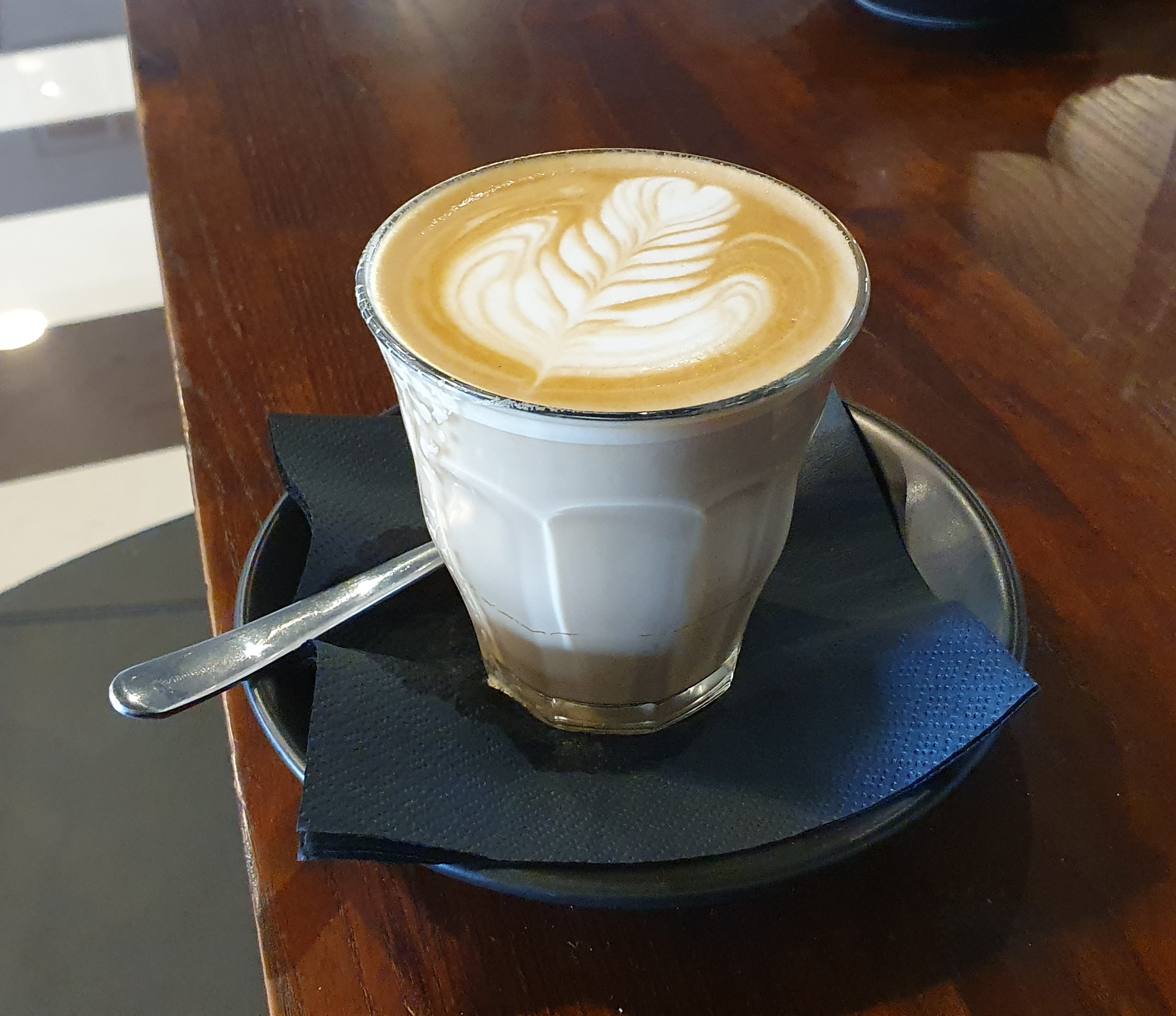
- Latte served with microfoam latte art in a South Australian café
- Alternative names: Caffè latte, caffè e latte, caffellatte, caffelatte
- Type: Milk coffee
- Place of origin: Italy
- Main ingredients: Espresso coffee, steamed milk

Latte (/ˈlɑːteɪ/) or caffè latte (Italian: [kaffe(l)ˈlatte], also known as caffellatte, caffelatte, or rarely caffè e latte), is a coffee drink of Italian origin made with espresso coffee and steamed milk, traditionally served in a glass.

== Definition ==
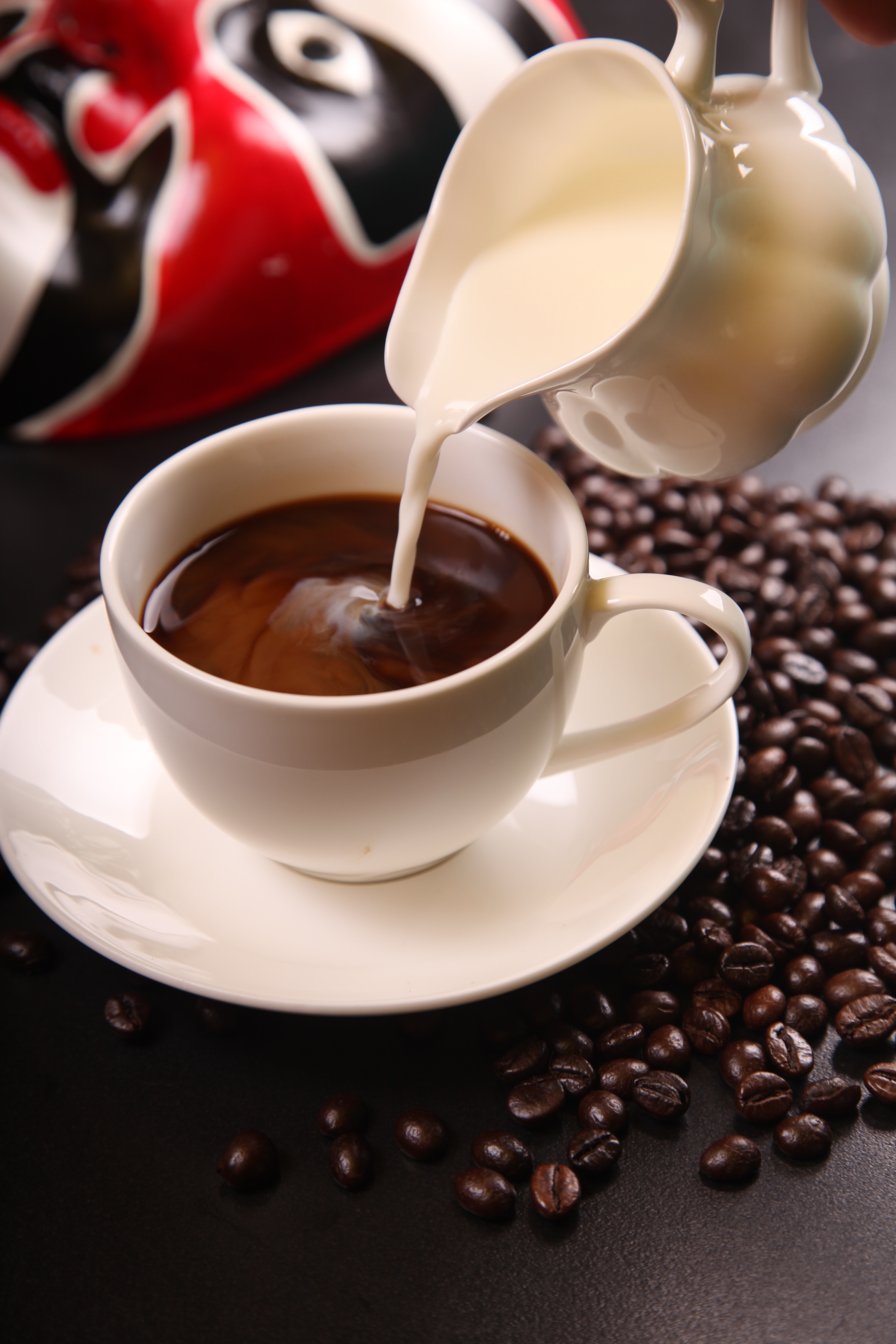
Preparation of latte

A latte consists of one or more shots of espresso coffee, served in a glass (or sometimes a cup) to which hot steamed milk is added. The difference between a latte and a cappuccino is that the cappuccino is served in a small 140 mL (5 US fl oz) cup with a layer of thick foam on top of the milk, and a latte is served in a larger 230 mL (8 US fl oz) glass (or cup), without the layer of thick foam. A latte is much milkier than a cappuccino, resulting in a milder coffee taste. A cappucino on the other hand, contains equal parts of steamed and foamed milk. The way the milk is steamed for a latte produces very fine bubbles incorporated in the hot milk; this microfoam can be poured in such a way as to form patterns in the white microfoam and brown crema, a technique known as latte art. The texture of the microfoam changes the taste and feel of the drink.

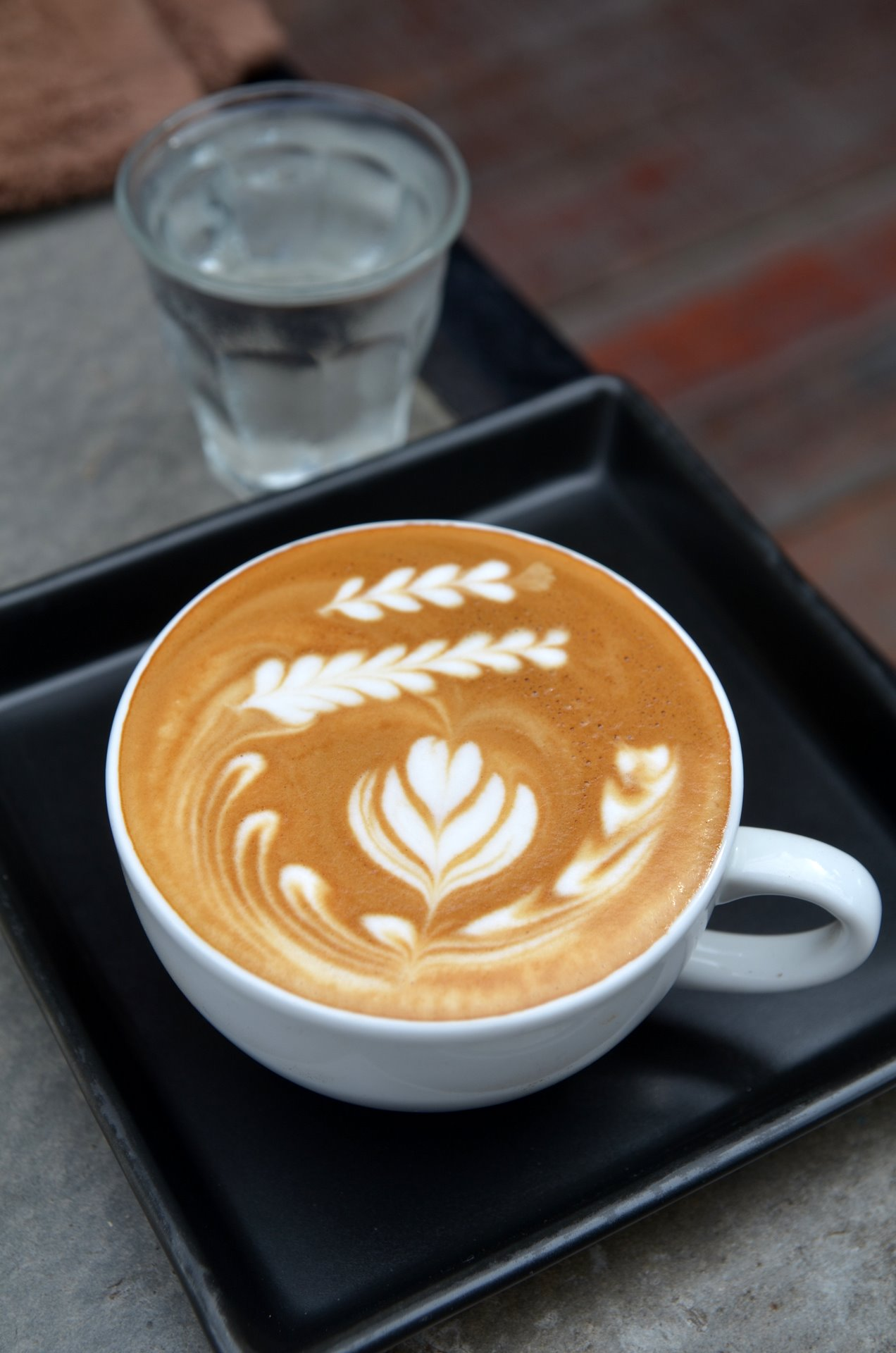
Latte art

A similar drink is the latte macchiato, which is also served in a glass, but the espresso is added to the glass after the steamed milk. In Italy milky coffee drinks such as latte, latte macchiato, and cappuccino are often prepared for breakfast only. In the United States, a latte is often heavily sweetened, usually with 3% or more of refined white sugar, artificial sweeteners, or agave syrup.

== Etymology ==
In Italian latte, an everyday word, means 'milk'; ordering a "latte" in Italy results in a glass of milk. The term "latte" used in English comes from the Italian caffè e latte (lit. 'coffee and milk'), or caffè latte or, less correctly, caffelatte.

== History ==
The drink is said to have "technically originated" in 17th-century Europe. In William Dean Howells' "Italian Journeys", he notes that he was served a drink described as "cafè latte" on a steamship when traveling from Trieste to Venice.

The modern caffè latte appeared in the 20th century, following the invention of the espresso machine in the 19th century. This was made possible by the addition of the steam wand to the espresso machine in 1903, which made it possible to add heat and texture to milk added to coffee.

== See also ==
Media related to Latte at Wikimedia Commons

- List of coffee drinks
