= Espresso Vivace =

American coffee shop chain

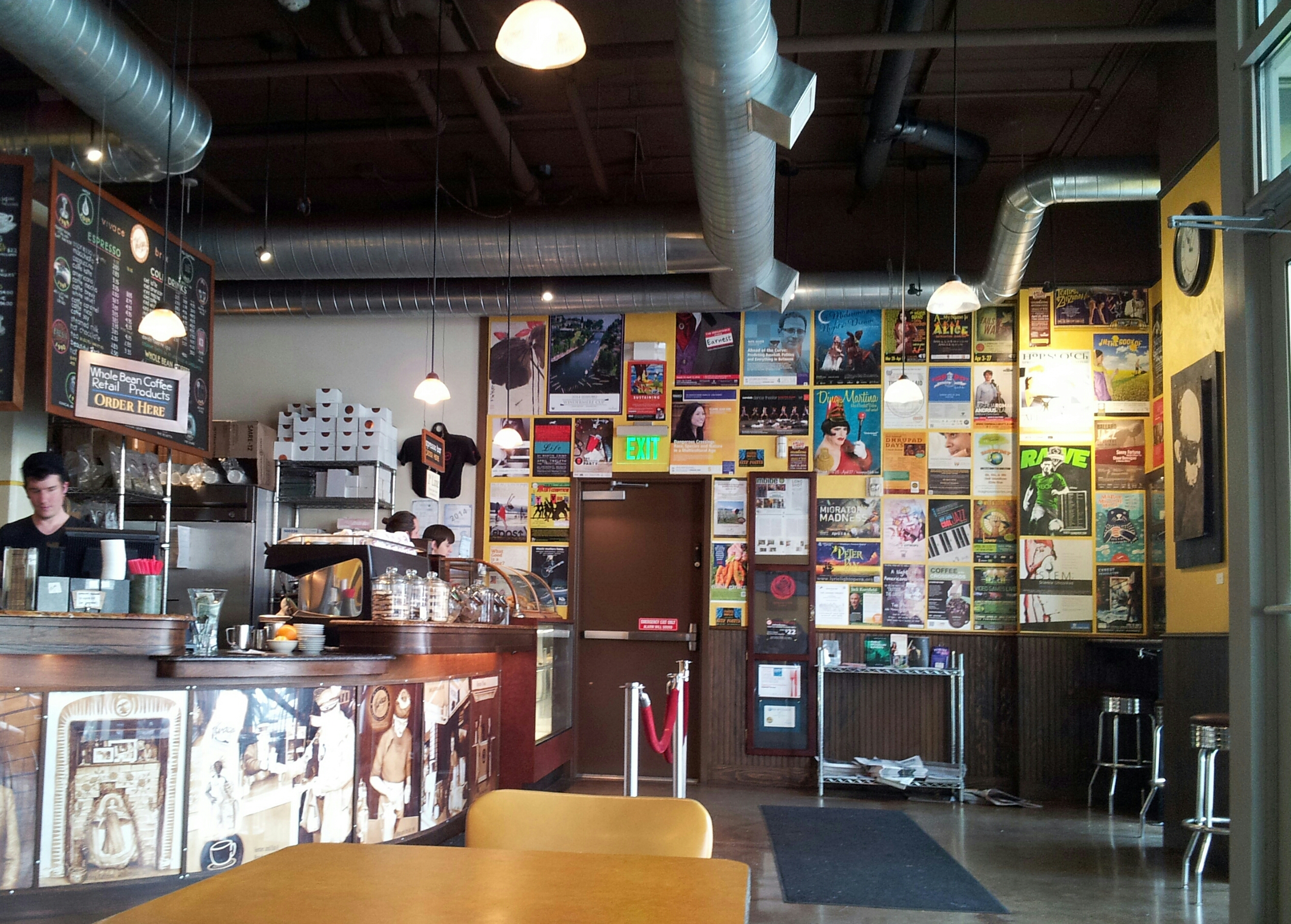
- Interior of the coffee shop on Capitol Hill, 2014
- Founded: Seattle, Washington, United States (1988)
- Founders: David C. Schomer and Geneva Sullivan
- Headquarters: Seattle, Washington
- Number of locations: 2
- Number of employees: ~30 (2016)
- Website: espressovivace.com

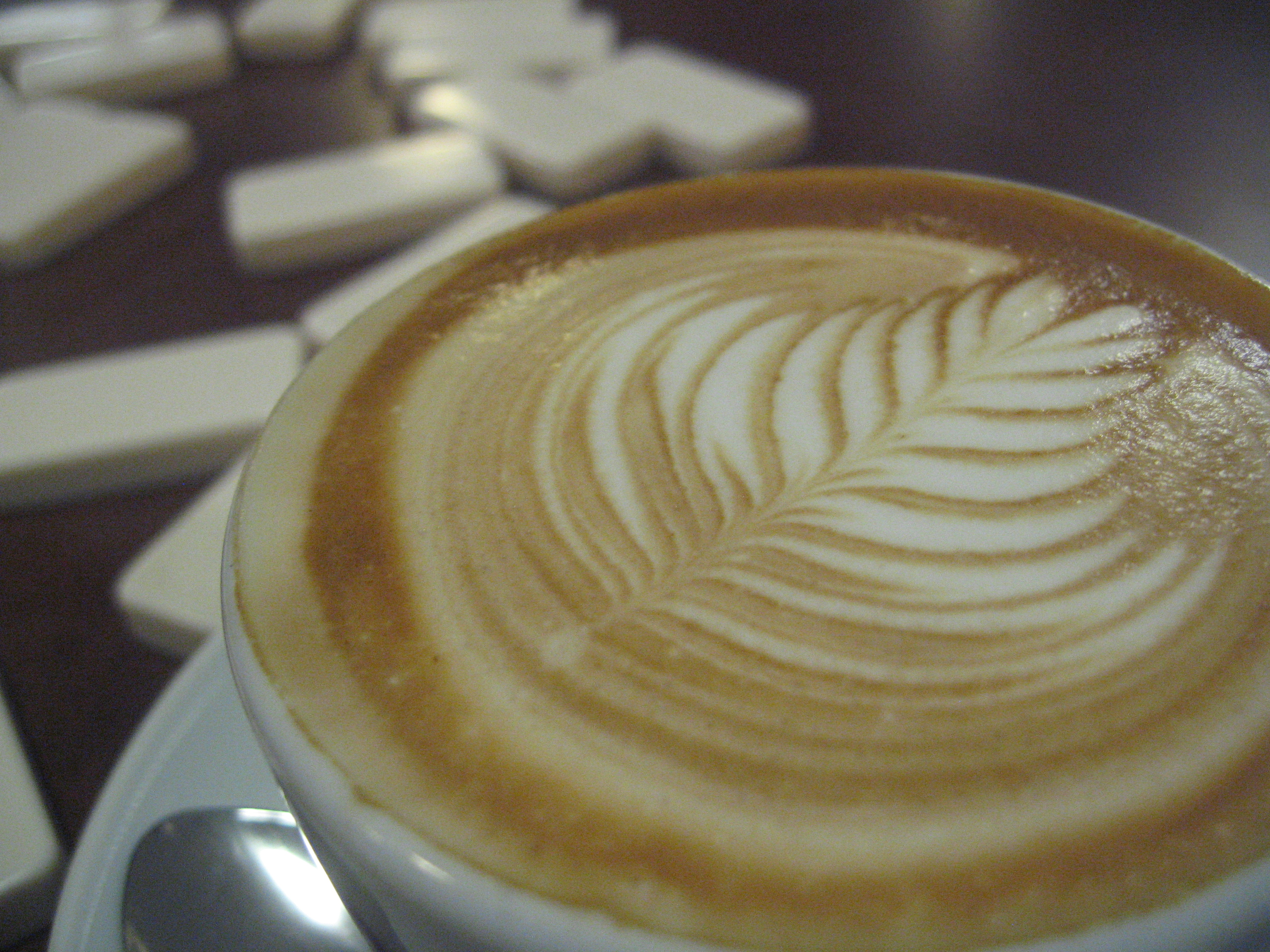
Latte art created at Espresso Vivace

Espresso Vivace is a Seattle area coffee shop and roaster known for its coffee and roasting practices. Vivace's owner, David Schomer, is credited with developing and popularizing latte art in the United States.

== History ==
Espresso Vivace was founded in 1988 by former Boeing engineer David C. Schomer and Digital Equipment Corporation mainframe technician Geneva Sullivan, who were married at that time. Espresso Vivaces's first incarnation was a coffee cart at 5th and Union, serving mainly financial industry workers, whom Schomer says did not consistently frequent the same cafes or pay close attention to quality.

Schomer and Sullivan opened a second street-facing, covered stand near the Broadway Market QFC grocery, and later a larger roastery cafe on South Broadway. Both were in the Capitol Hill neighborhood, where customers took greater notice, though the Seattle Central Community College customers "didn't know any better" without other nearby coffee shops operating on the same gourmet level. To make way for the Capitol Hill light rail station they were forced to move, choosing a new location five blocks north, near "high-end housing." Here Espresso Vivace found customers who Schomer said were more able to appreciate gourmet coffee as an art form, and who generally became "rabidly loyal" to their favorite haunts. Sullivan and Schomer's business partnership continued after their divorce in 2008.

In May 2023, Espresso Vivace permanently closed its bar on Broadway in Seattle's Capitol Hill neighborhood. The closure was attributed to the proximity of the company’s flagship café at the nearby Brix building, which led to internal competition for customers, as well as staffing challenges following the COVID-19 pandemic. The company continued to operate its other locations, including the flagship café and a shop in South Lake Union.

== See also ==
- List of coffeehouse chains
