= Latte art =

Type of decoration on coffee

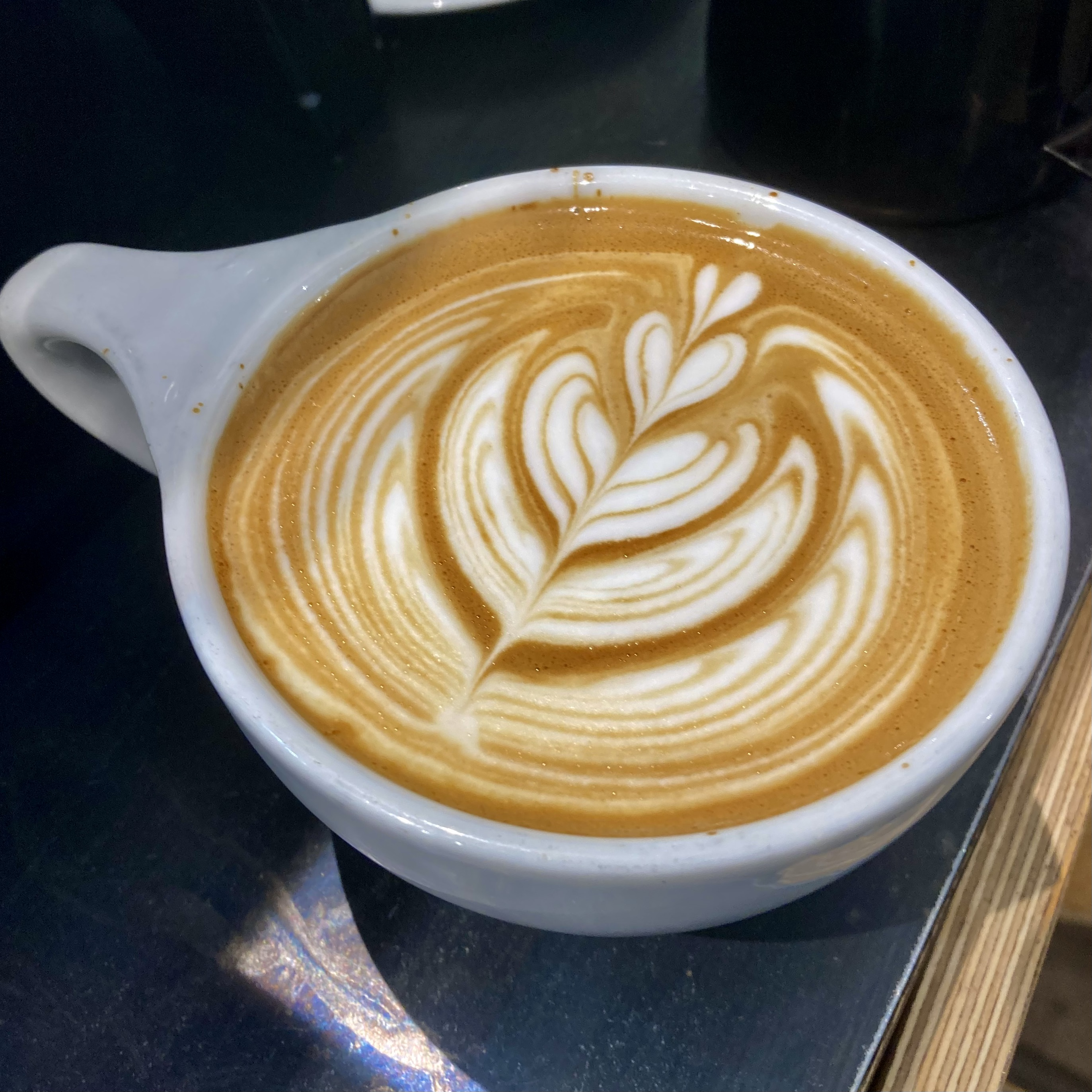
Caffè latte with an example of a "tulip"

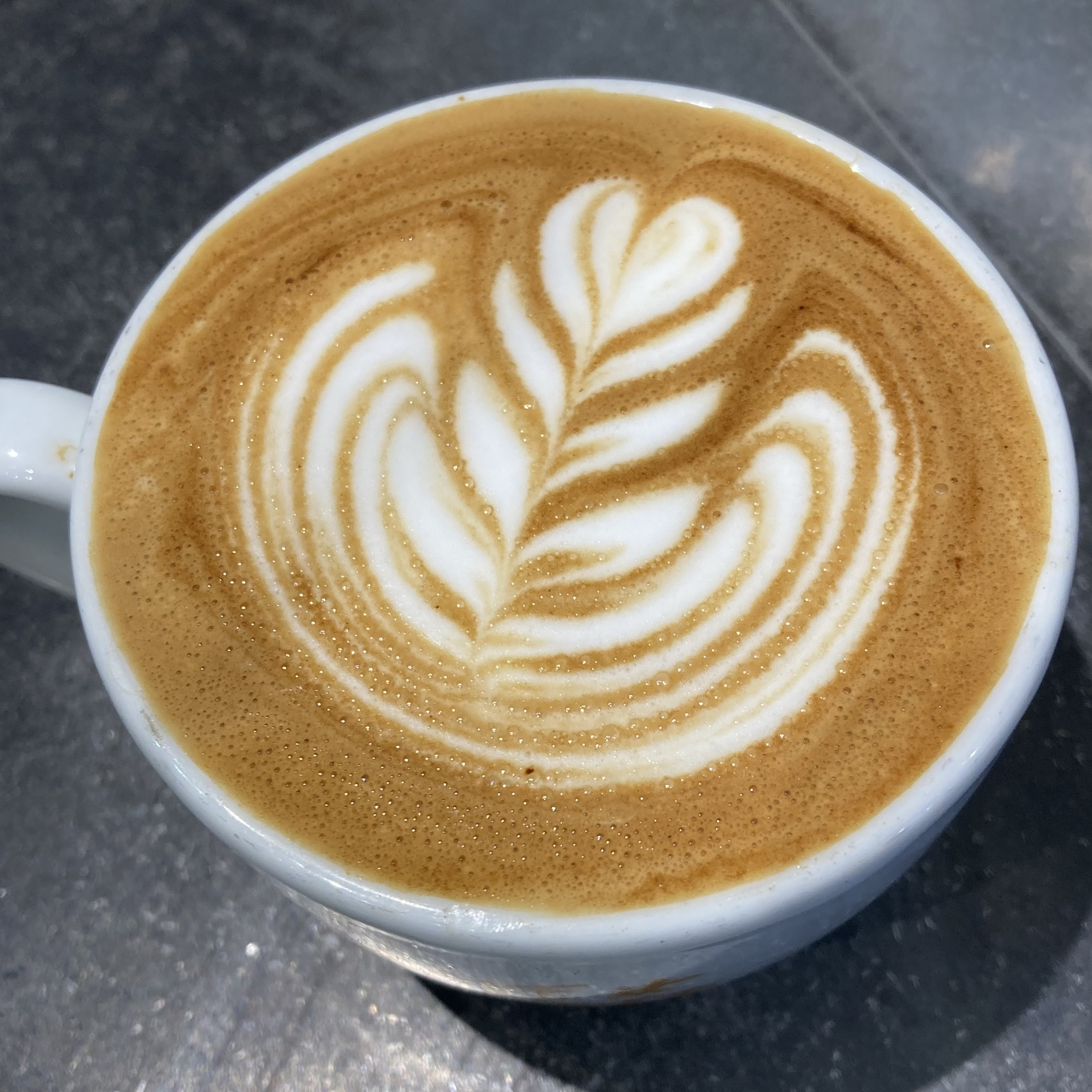
Latte art rosette pattern

Latte art is a method of preparing coffee created by pouring microfoam into a shot of espresso and resulting in a pattern or design on the surface of the caffè latte, cappuccino or hot chocolate. It can also be created or embellished by simply "drawing" in the top layer of foam. Latte art is particularly difficult to create consistently, due to the demanding conditions required of both the espresso shot and milk. This, in turn, is limited by the experience of the barista, type of milk, and quality of the espresso machine.

== History ==
Latte art developed independently in different countries, following the introduction of espresso and the development of microfoam, the combination of crema (which is an emulsion of coffee oil and brewed coffee) and microfoam allowing the pattern; it was initially developed in Italy. (Note: David Schomer (Schomer 1994) describes pitcher-shaking in latte art as "quite standard in the world of Italian espresso preparation", indicating that it established in Italy by this time.)

In the United States, latte art was developed in Seattle in the 1980s and 1990s, and particularly popularized by David Schomer. Schomer credits the development of microfoam ("velvet foam" or "milk texturing") to Jack Kelly of Uptown espresso in 1986, and by 1989 the heart pattern was established and a signature at Schomer's Espresso Vivace. The rosette pattern was then developed by Schomer in 1992, recreating the technique based on a photograph he saw at Cafe Mateki in Italy. Schomer subsequently popularized latte art in his course "Caffe Latte Art".

Simultaneously, in Italy, Luigi Lupi of Caffè Musetti had a significant impact on the popularization of latte art through instructional videos. Lupi and Schomer collaborated on latte art to improve their technique after meeting online in the late 1990s. Lupi and his refined latte art rose to international recognition during the 2002 Barista World Championship, where he placed 4th.

== Chemistry ==
Latte art is a mixture of two colloids: the crema, which is an emulsion of coffee oil and brewed coffee; and the microfoam, which is a foam of air in milk. Milk itself is an emulsion of butterfat in water, while coffee is a mixture of coffee solids in water. Neither of these colloids are stable—crema dissipates from espresso, while microfoam separates into drier foam and liquid milk—both degrading significantly in a matter of seconds, and thus latte art lasts only briefly.

== Technique ==
Video of the "leaf" pattern being formed

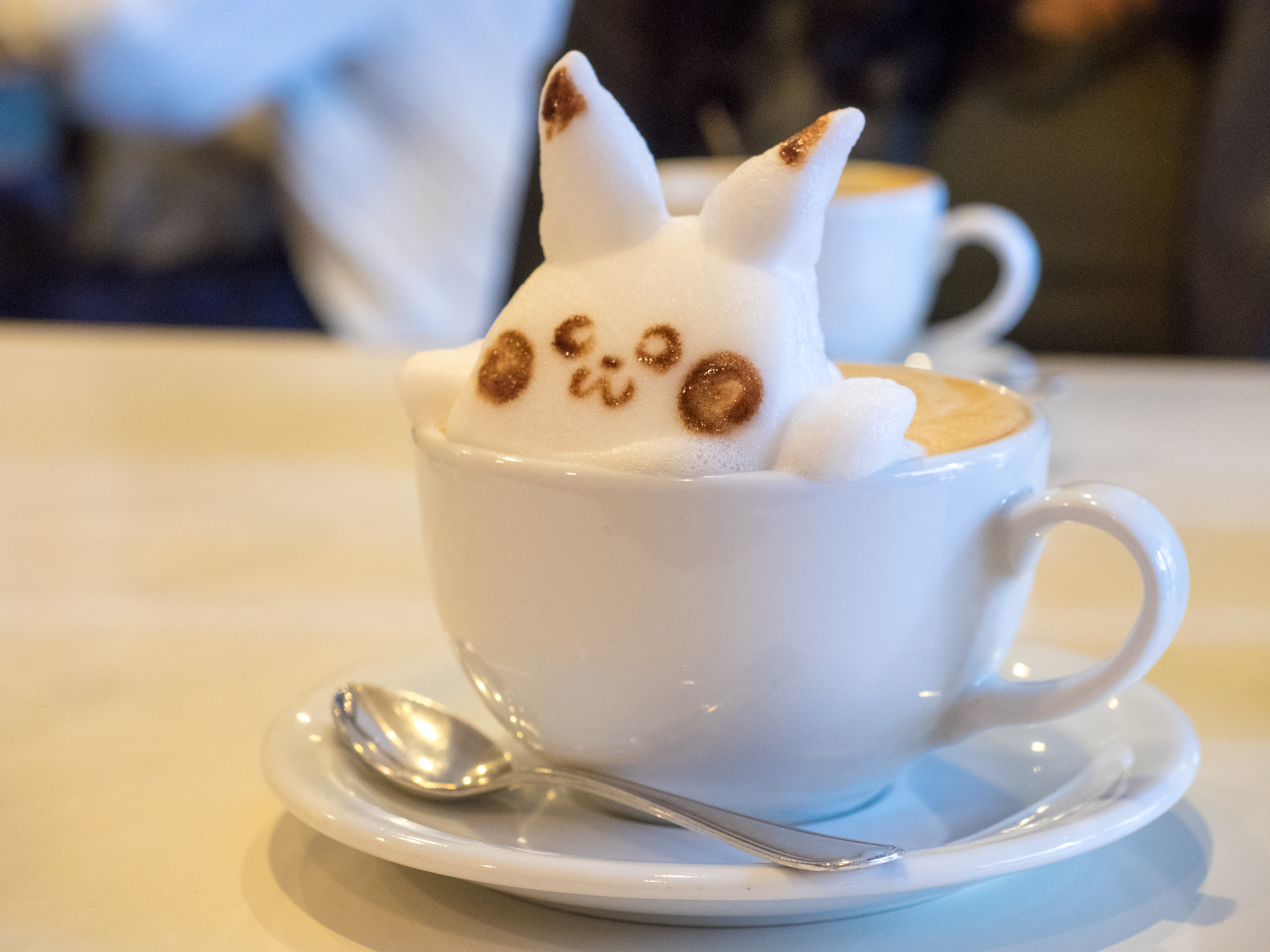
3D Latte art in "CAFE REISSUE", Jingūmae(Harajuku), Tokyo, Japan

Latte art requires first producing espresso with crema and microfoam, and then combining these to make latte art.

Before the milk is added, the espresso shot must have a creamy brown surface, an emulsion known as crema. As the white foam from the milk rises to meet the red/brown surface of the shot, a contrast is created and the design emerges. As the milk is poured, the foam separates from the liquid and rises to the top. If the milk and espresso shot are "just right", and the pitcher is moved during the pour, the foam will rise to create a pattern on the surface. Alternatively, a pattern may be etched with a stick after the milk has been poured, rather than during the pour.

Some controversy exists within the coffee community as to whether or not there is excessive focus on latte art amongst baristas. The argument is that too much focus on the superficial appearance of a drink leads some to ignore more important issues, such as taste. This is especially relevant with new baristas.

== Certification ==
Latte art certification programs assess a barista's technique in both latte art and espresso preparation. The Latte Art Grading System (LAGS), created by the Italian barista Luigi Lupi with Luca Ramoni, certifies technical skill and creativity through a series of graded practical examinations, each represented by a different color. The scheme originally had five grades (white, orange, green, red and black) and has since added a sixth, gold. At the lower grades, candidates are expected to demonstrate basic pouring technique and simple patterns such as the heart and tulip; higher grades require more complex designs such as the rosetta, and greater control, precision and consistency.

== See also ==
Media related to Latte art at Wikimedia Commons
