= Microfoam =

Finely textured milk used in coffee drinks

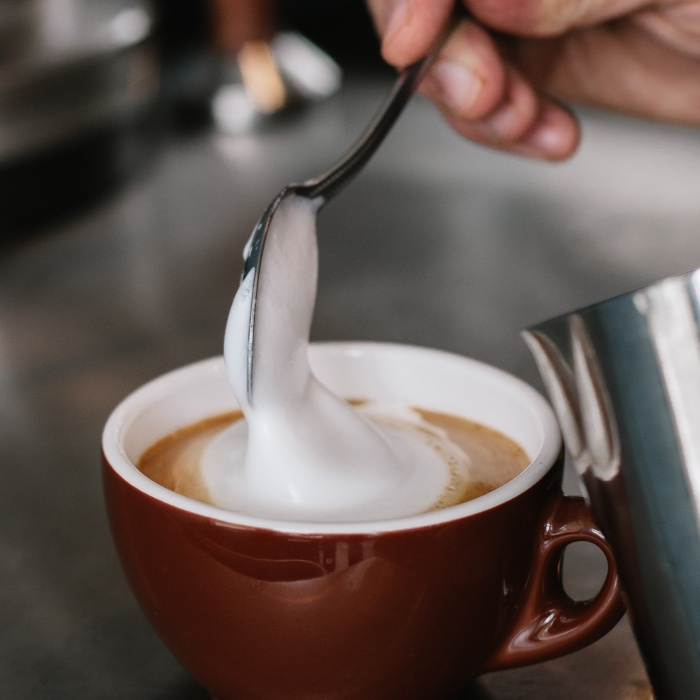
"Macrofoam" (pictured), or milk frothed with larger air bubbles, is traditionally used in cappuccinos and does not allow for latte art, whereas "Microfoam" is used in caffè lattes and allows for the making of latte art.

Microfoam is finely textured milk used for making espresso-based coffee drinks, particularly those with latte art. It is typically made with the steam wand of an espresso machine, which pumps steam into a pitcher of milk.

The opposite of microfoam is Macrofoam (also called dry foam, in contrast to the wet foam of microfoam), which has visibly large bubbles, a style of milk, traditionally used for cappuccinos.

== Characteristics ==
Microfoam is shiny, slightly thickened, and should have microscopic, uniform bubbles. It is not as viscous or "foamy" as macrofoam – it is better described as "gooey" and resembles melted marshmallows or wet paint. There have been a variety of names used for this ideal standard, such as "microfoam", "velvet milk", "microbubbles", and so forth.

== Applications ==
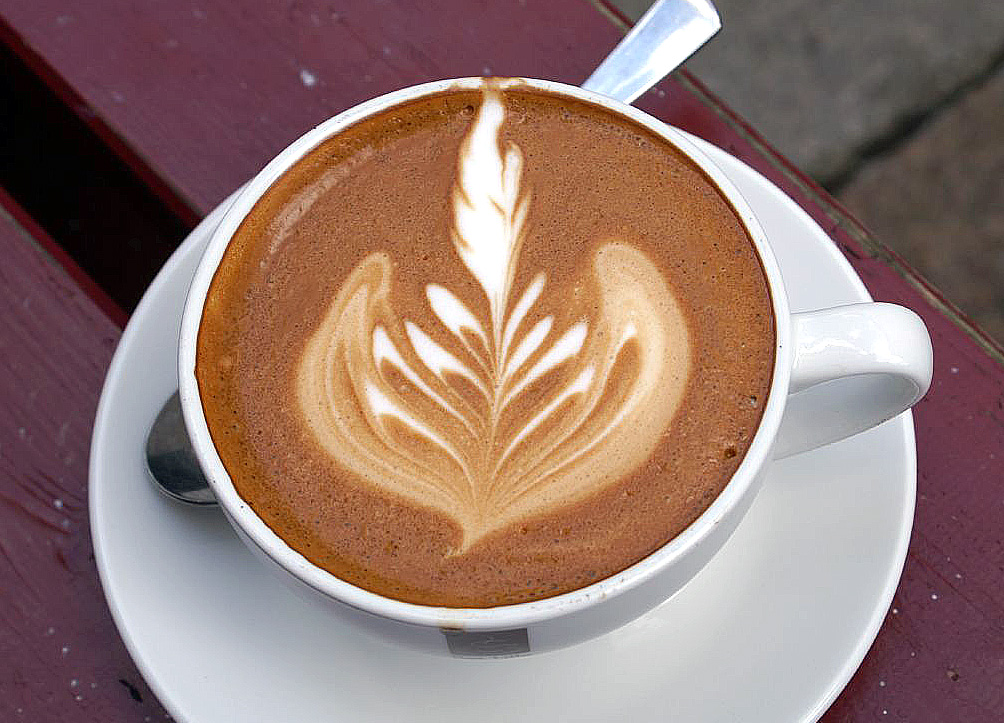
Microfoam is primarily used for making latte art, such as this rosette.

The decorative application of microfoam is called latte art, which involves making patterns in espresso-based drinks. Microfoam is essential for this as the microscopic bubbles give definition and stability to the patterns, which are harder to achieve with macrofoam which disperses more readily. Latte art is traditionally associated with lattes, as the name suggests, but can also be used in cappuccinos and other drinks.

A cappuccino made with microfoam is sometimes called a "wet" cappuccino. However, cappuccinos typically use thicker macrofoam, with a layer of dry foam floating on the top of the drink. Latte macchiato is another drink which generally has separate layers of dry foam and liquid milk, but microfoam is occasionally used instead. Microfoam may also be added to brewed coffee in a café au lait, and faint latte art can be produced. Microfoam may also be used in a steamer (a "coffee-free" cappuccino), though this can instead be made with dry foam.

As it requires a skilled barista to produce microfoam (especially when used for latte art), it is a sign of attention to quality, and a defining characteristic of the third wave of coffee.

== Procedure ==
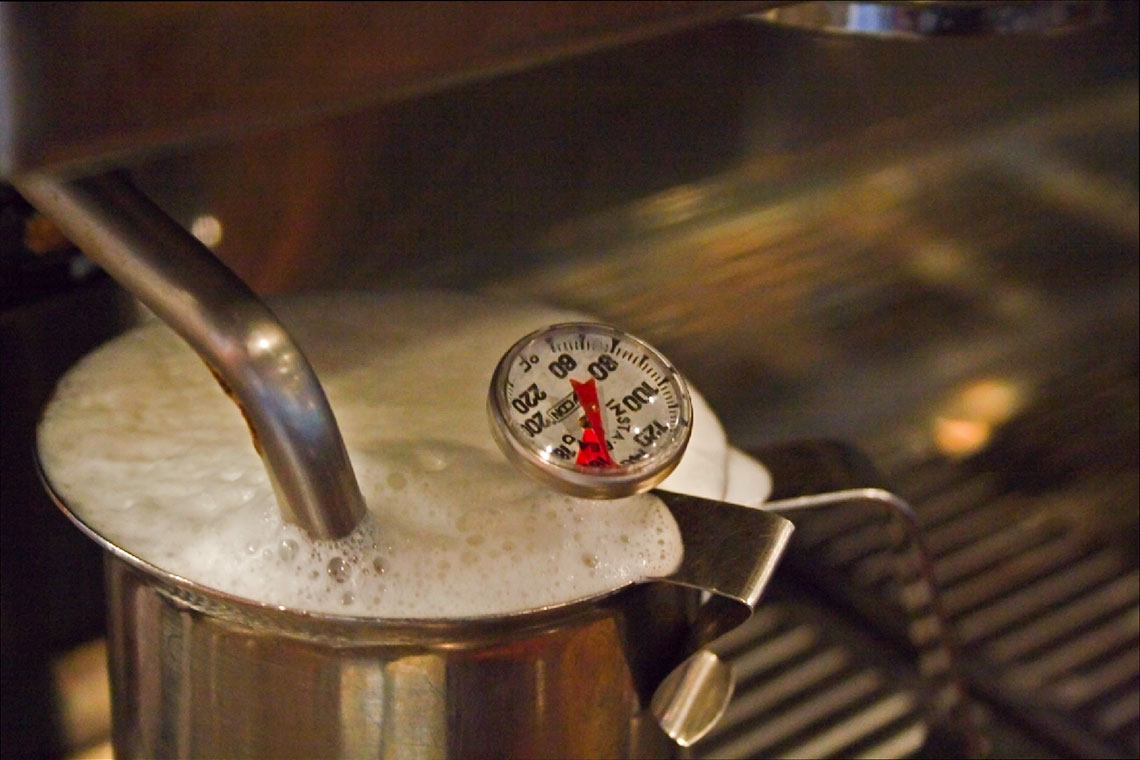
Milk being steamed. This milk would be too "foamy" for latte art, due to too much air (large bubbles) and the air not being sufficiently mixed into the milk.

Microfoam is usually created with the steam wand of an espresso machine. This is the quickest method and provides precise control over the timing and depth of air injection. Alternative methods are rarely as effective for producing microfoam, but some are acceptable for macrofoam. These include whisking, shaking, and hand pumps. Dedicated electric milk frothers may also be used, usually consisting of a motorized whisk.

When using a steam wand, the volume and type of foam is controlled by the barista during the steaming process, and loosely follows these steps:

1. Air is introduced from the steam wand by immersing only the tip of the wand in the milk. This process is sometimes known as frothing, stretching, or surfing, and usually lasts less than 10 seconds. After the creation of small bubbles, the milk is covered with a soft foam phase which separates from the liquid and floats on top of the milk.
2. The second stage involves mixing the incorporated air throughout the milk (mixing or texturing), which is achieved by immersing the steam wand more deeply (typically 20–30 mm). This creates a turbulent vortex or "whirlpool" in the vessel. This step is necessary to integrate the foam which naturally separates from the liquid phase. During this stage, the milk is also heated to about 70 °C (158 °F), at which point the steaming is finished.
3. Lastly, the milk is poured from the pitcher into a cup, usually already containing espresso. Methods for pouring vary widely depending on the type of drink and personal technique.

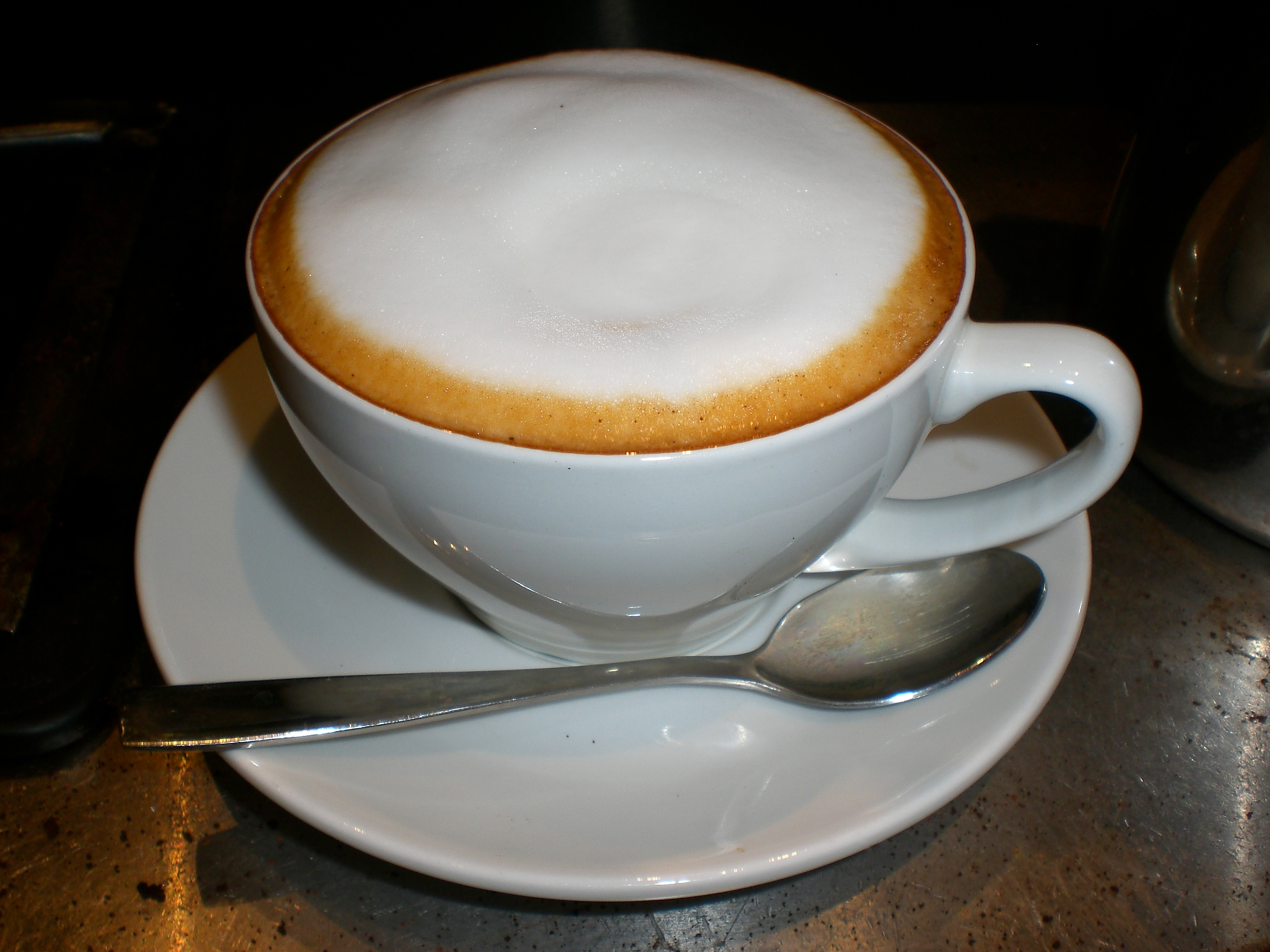
In a traditional, or "dry", cappuccino, the foam is light (high air-to-milk ratio) and floats on top on the espresso. Latte art requires heavier, "wetter" foam.

=== Notable variations ===
The details of the above method vary between baristas, and are influenced by the machine and the desired outcome.

- It is common to briefly switch on the steam wand before using it, in order to flush any condensed water from the plumbing and preheat the steam wand itself. The same is often done after steaming milk, to remove milk residue.
- On machines with pivoting steam wands, the wand should be between 10° and 30° from vertical. However, some baristas tilt the jug relative to the steam wand, whilst keeping the wand almost vertical.
- If milk has been over-aerated (i.e. the froth is too thick), it may be groomed by running the tip of a spoon through it.
- As a supplementary method of mixing, a barista may swirl the pitcher just before pouring it. This method is also used to assess whether grooming is necessary (see above), and is intended to delay separation of the milk.
- In order to remove any large bubbles from the surface, some baristas tap the jug on a bench before pouring
- Occasionally a barista may use less-than-full pressure from the steam wand, if they are steaming a very small amount of milk (variable pressure is usually only a feature on professional machines)
- It is also possible to create microfoam for latte art by using a french press, moving the plunger rapidly to aerate the milk. This method can, with practice, yield close to same consistency as with using a steamwand.
- A stovetop steamer is also a viable option for generating microfoam.

== Chemical and physical properties ==
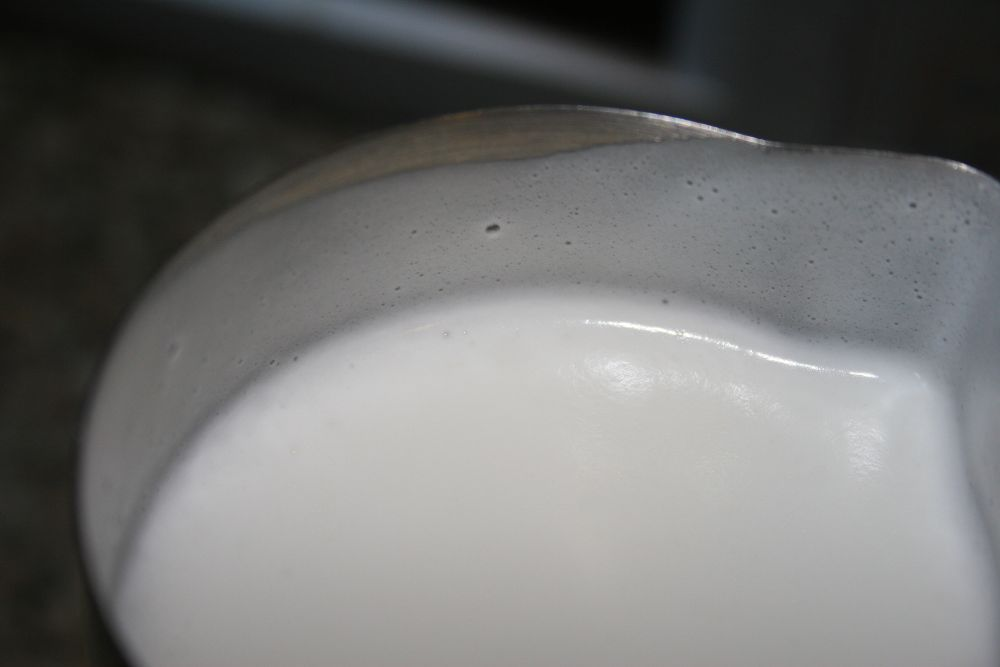
An example of properly steamed milk, considered ideal to pour latte art

The basic requirements for formation of foam are an abundance of gas, water, a surfactant, and energy. The steam wand of an espresso machine supplies energy, in the form of heat, and gas, in the form of steam. The other two components, water and surfactants, are naturally occurring ingredients of milk. Varying the balance of these factors affects the size of bubbles, the foam dissipation rate, and the volume of foam.

Microfoam may be represented simply as a metastable liquid-gas colloid of milk and air, consisting of gaseous bubbles suspended in the liquid milk. In reality, the suspension is more complex because milk consists of two different colloids itself - an emulsion of fat and a sol of protein. In fact, these two colloids are what enable milk to form such a mechanically strong foam which does not collapse under its own weight. The interaction between fat and air creates a structure of microscopic bubbles strong enough to support itself, and even be submerged (i.e. suspended within the liquid milk).

=== Interaction of fat and protein ===
Like in whipped cream, air bubbles are initially stabilized by the protein β-casein, prior to their adsorption of fat. This adsorption causes destabilization of the bubbles, because the fat molecules are amphiphilic (i.e. they have polar and non-polar ends), competing with protein molecules which are more conducive to bubbles. The denaturation of milk fat occurs around 40 °C (104 °F), so milk at higher temperatures is not significantly affected by this problem. At higher temperatures, the protein β-lactoglobulin enables the foam to maintain its structure and is the prime factor in the formation of foam. This can be shown trivially by adding various quantities of skim milk powder which contains a high concentration of β-lactoglobulin.

Since fat reduces the likelihood of bonding at the surface of bubbles, it follows that fat content in milk is inversely proportional to its frothing potential. Whilst this is true, an excessive fat constituent also enables larger bubbles, leading to macrofoam rather than microfoam. As a result, most baristas prefer to use whole milk rather than skim milk, due to its tendency to form smaller, more homogeneous bubbles.

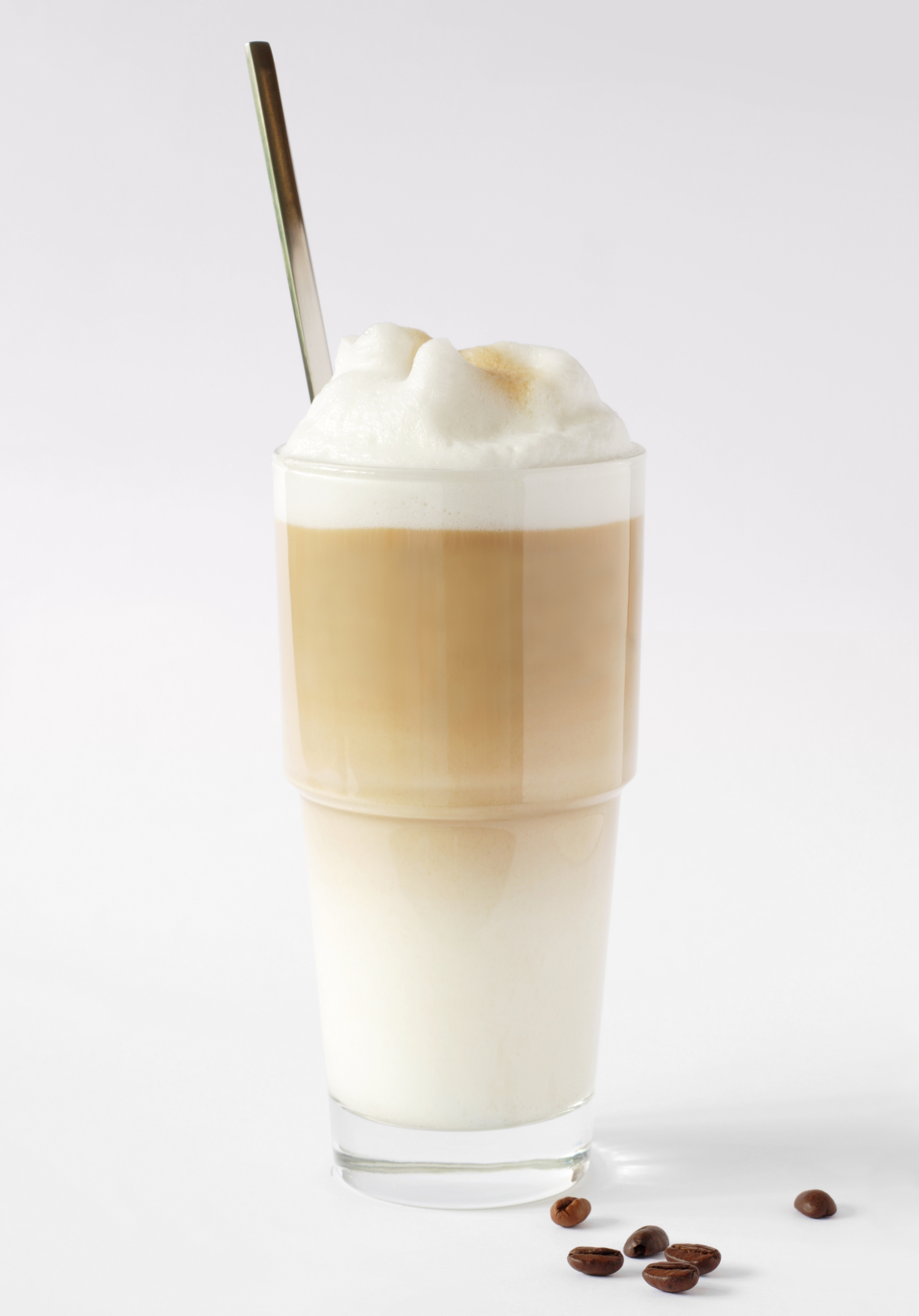
Microfoam is unstable, decomposing into a layer of "dry" foam over a layer of liquid milk, as in this latte macchiato.

=== Effect of temperature ===
Several studies have confirmed that the foamability of pasteurized whole milk, measured by the volume of foam produced, reaches a minimum at 25 °C (77 °F). This value is higher for raw milk - around 35 °C (95 °F). The dip in foamability occurs due to fat globules consisting of both solid and liquid phases at this temperature. Solid fat crystals in a globule may penetrate the film which separates them from the surrounding air, causing spreading of the membrane material which is then adsorbed onto air bubbles. At temperatures above the minimum foamability temperature, the volume of foam steadily increases, which has been attributed to the trends of decreasing viscosity and surface tension with temperature.

If milk is heated above 82 °C (180 °F), it becomes scalded and its texture is compromised. Microfoam cannot exist in overheated milk due to the missing tertiary structure in the protein. When milk is scalded, the suspended protein casein becomes denatured and cannot maintain the intermolecular bonds necessary for microfoam.

The stability of milk foam, measured by the half-life of its volume, is also greatly influenced by temperature. For pasteurized whole milk, stability increases with temperature up to about 40 °C (104 °F), then rises steeply until 60 °C (140 °F), where it starts steadily decreasing. Skim milk generally produces more stable foam, owing to its lower concentration of micellar casein. For regular pasteurized, homogenized whole milk, steamed at 70 °C (158 °F), the half-life is roughly 150 minutes. However, microfoam tends to separate into layers more quickly than it reduces in volume, so baristas usually steam milk immediately before serving it. This is especially important when serving latte art which may degrade within minutes.

=== Sound ===
When using a steam wand, a slight but audible hissing sound occurs when the air enters the milk, mainly due to microscopic cavitation. A louder screaming sound may be heard if the steam orifice becomes blocked or the machine cannot pump enough air.
