= David Schomer =

American entrepreneur

David C. Schomer
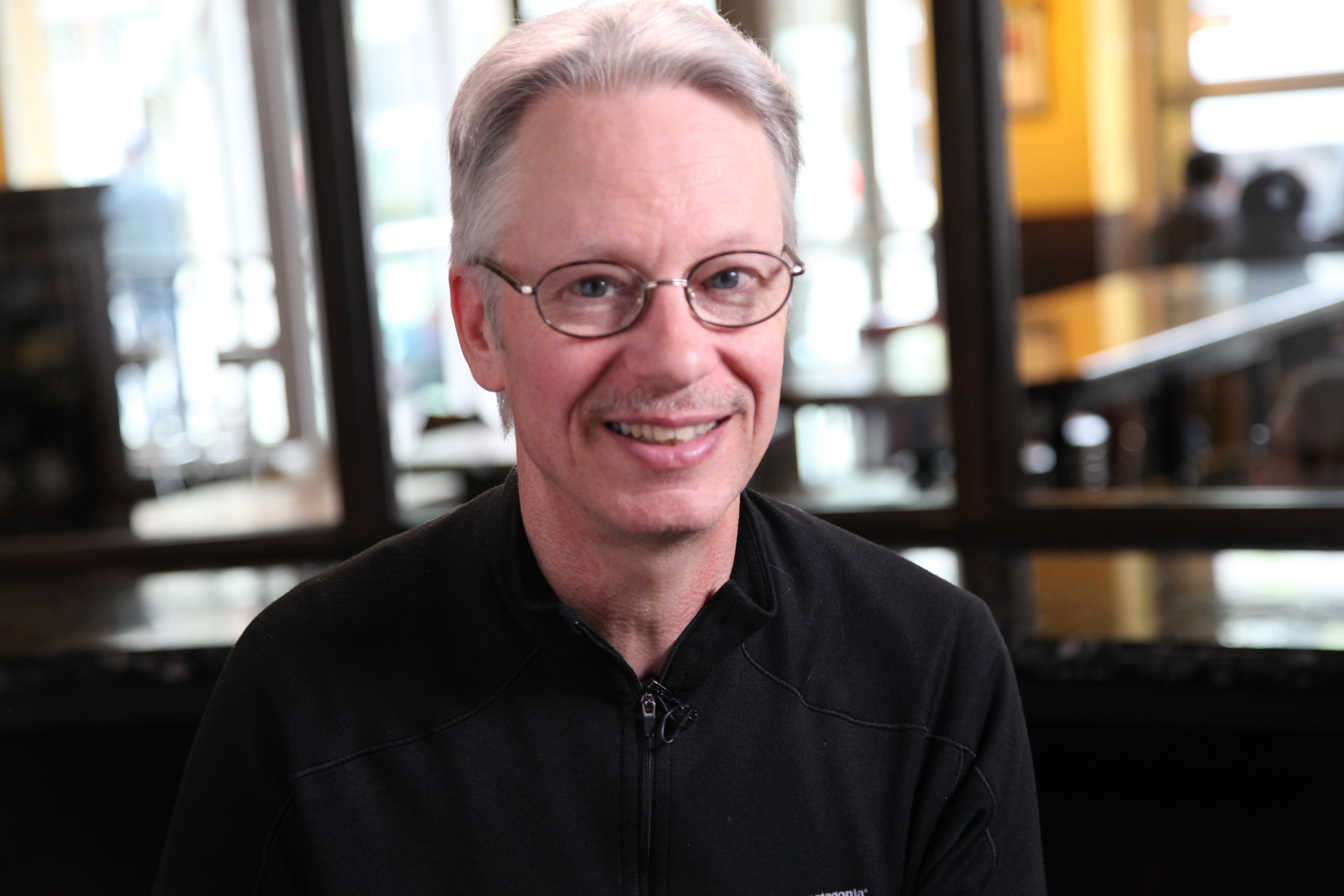
- Born: 1956 (age 69–70)
- Occupations: USAF electronics technician, Boeing metrologist, coffee roaster
- Years active: Since 1988
- Known for: Latte art, cafe entrepreneur
- Notable work: Espresso Coffee: Professional Techniques
- Spouse: Geneva Sullivan (m. 1980s d. 2008)
- Children: 2

David Schomer is a co-founder of Espresso Vivace. The Seattle Times said "Schomer is as influential in the gourmet coffee world as Starbucks CEO Howard Schultz is in the mainstream coffee industry."

== Early life and education ==
Schomer joined the United States Air Force in 1974. Schomer received a BFA in classical flute performance from Cornish College of the Arts in Seattle.

== Career ==
Schomer became known within the coffee industry for his innovations, such as how he customizes his grinders and espresso machines with PID controllers to achieve a more constant water temperature.

Besides training hundreds of baristas who went on to influence coffee shops across the country, Schomer self published a book on espresso techniques in 1994, while also writing columns for Café Ole magazine in the 1990s. Mark Pendergrast said that Schomer inherited the title of "world's most passionate espresso engineer" upon the death of Italian food chemist Ernesto Illy in 2008. Schomer's 1996 Espresso Coffee: Professional Techniques has been described as "the industry bible".

Schomer credits Espresso Vivace's survival in a competitive market to his own "absolute fidelity" to the goal of "making a better cup", together with the sound fiscal and operations management of his business partner and former spouse, Geneva Sullivan. Espresso Vivaces's first incarnation was a coffee cart, at 5th and Union, serving mainly financial industry workers, whom Schomer says did not consistently frequent the same cafes or pay close attention to quality.
