= Vienna (disambiguation) =

Vienna is the capital and a federal state of Austria.

Vienna may also refer to:

== Geography ==
- Vienna, Hunters Hill, a cottage in Hunters Hill, a suburb of Sydney, Australia
- the River Vienna, a small river meeting the Danube at Vienna; see Wien River, Austria
- Vienna, Ontario, Canada
- Vienne, Isère, France, known in Roman times as Vienna

=== United States ===
- Vienna, Alabama, an unincorporated community
- Vienna, Georgia, a census-designated place (CDP)
- Vienna, Illinois, a city
- Vienna, Indiana, a township
- The Vienna, a building in Indianapolis, Indiana, listed on the National Register of Historic Places
- Vienna, Louisiana, a town
- Vienna, Maine, a town
- Vienna, Maryland, a town
- Vienna, Michigan, an unincorporated community
- Vienna Township, Genesee County, Michigan, a township
- Vienna Township, Montmorency County, Michigan, a township
- Vienna Township, Rock County, Minnesota, a township
- Vienna, Missouri, a town
- Vienna, New York, a town and hamlet
- Vienna, North Carolina, a small unincorporated community
- Vienna, Ohio, a census-designated place (CDP) and township
- Vienna, South Dakota, a town
- Vienna, Virginia, a town
- Vienna, West Virginia, a town
- Vienna, Wisconsin, a town
- Vienna or Honey Lake, Wisconsin, an unincorporated community

== Music ==
- Vienna (album), an album by Ultravox
  - "Vienna" (Ultravox song), a song by Ultravox
- "Vienna" (Billy Joel song), from The Stranger (1977)
- "Vienna", a song by Trans-Siberian Orchestra from Beethoven's Last Night
- "Vienna", a song by The Fray on the Movement EP
- "Vienna Calling", a song by Austrian musician Falco
- Vienna horn, a musical instrument
- Vienna Vienna, an alternative musician on DCD2 Records

== Games ==
- Vienna coup, a play technique in contract bridge
- Vienna Game, a chess opening
- Vienna System (bridge), a bidding system in contract bridge

== Treaties, conventions and diplomatic conferences ==
- Treaty of Vienna (1738)
- Vienna Convention (disambiguation)
- Congress of Vienna (1814–1815)
- Vienna Convention on Diplomatic Relations (1961)
- Vienna Convention on Civil Liability for Nuclear Damage (1963)
- Vienna Convention on Consular Relations (1963)
- Vienna Convention on Road Traffic (1968)
- Vienna Convention on the Law of Treaties (1969)
- U.N. Convention on Contracts for the International Sale of Goods (1980)
- Vienna Convention for the Protection of the Ozone Layer (1985)
- Vienna Convention on the Law of Treaties between States and International Organizations or Between International Organizations (1986)
- Vienna Document of the Organization for Security and Co-Operation in Europe for confidence and security building measures
- United Nations Convention Against Illicit Traffic in Narcotic Drugs and Psychotropic Substances (1988)
- First Vienna Award (1939), an arbitral decision rewarding disputed territory to Hungary
- Second Vienna Award (1940), an arbitral decision rewarding disputed territory to Hungary

== Other uses ==
- Vienna (audio drama series), based on the TV series Doctor Who
- Vienna (comics), a fictional character in Marvel Comics' Marvel Universe
- Vienna (film), a 1968 short film by Orson Welles
- Vienna Beef, a manufacturer of Chicago style hot dogs and other foods
- Vienna bread
- Vienna Development Method from theoretical computer science
- Vienna lager, a style of beer first brewed in Vienna in 1841
- Vienna Teng (born 1978), singer-songwriter
- Luis Vienna (born 1938), Argentine sprinter
- Vienna rectifier, a electrical device that converts three-phase AC to DC
- Vienna sausage
- University of Vienna
- "Vienna", a poem by Stephen Spender
- A cat in Rising Damp
- A character in the 1954 film Johnny Guitar
- A computer virus that first appeared in 1987
- Vienna, the codename of a cancelled release of Windows

== See also ==
- Wien (disambiguation)
- Vienne (disambiguation)
- Viennese (disambiguation)
- Vienna station (disambiguation)
- New Vienna (disambiguation)
- Siege of Vienna (disambiguation)
- Vienna summit, a 1961 conference between U.S. president Kennedy and Soviet premier Khrushchev
- Viena expedition, a 1918 Finnish military operation
- Viena Balen (born 1986), Croatian road cyclist
