= Spring Prairie =

Spring Prairie is the name of several places in the United States:

- Spring Prairie Township, Minnesota
- Spring Prairie, Wisconsin, a town
  - Spring Prairie (community), Wisconsin, an unincorporated community
