= Vienna Township, Michigan =

Vienna Township is the name of some places in the U.S. state of Michigan:

- Vienna Township, Genesee County, Michigan (Vienna Charter Township, Michigan)
- Vienna Township, Montmorency County, Michigan

See also

- Vienna Township (disambiguation)
