= Vienna attack =

Vienna attack may refer to a series of attacks in Vienna including:

- 1981 Vienna synagogue attack
- 1985 Rome and Vienna airport attacks
- 2009 Vienna temple attack
- 2020 Vienna attack

== See also ==
- Siege of Vienna (disambiguation)
- Battle of Vienna, Virginia, U.S., 1861
