= Franziskaner (disambiguation) =

Franziskaner in German means:

1. a Franciscan friar or
2. a beer brewed by the Spaten-Franziskaner-Bräu.
3. a coffee-made beverage also known as espresso con panna
