= Flat red =

Drink of espresso coffee with steamed orange and pomegranate juice

Flat Red
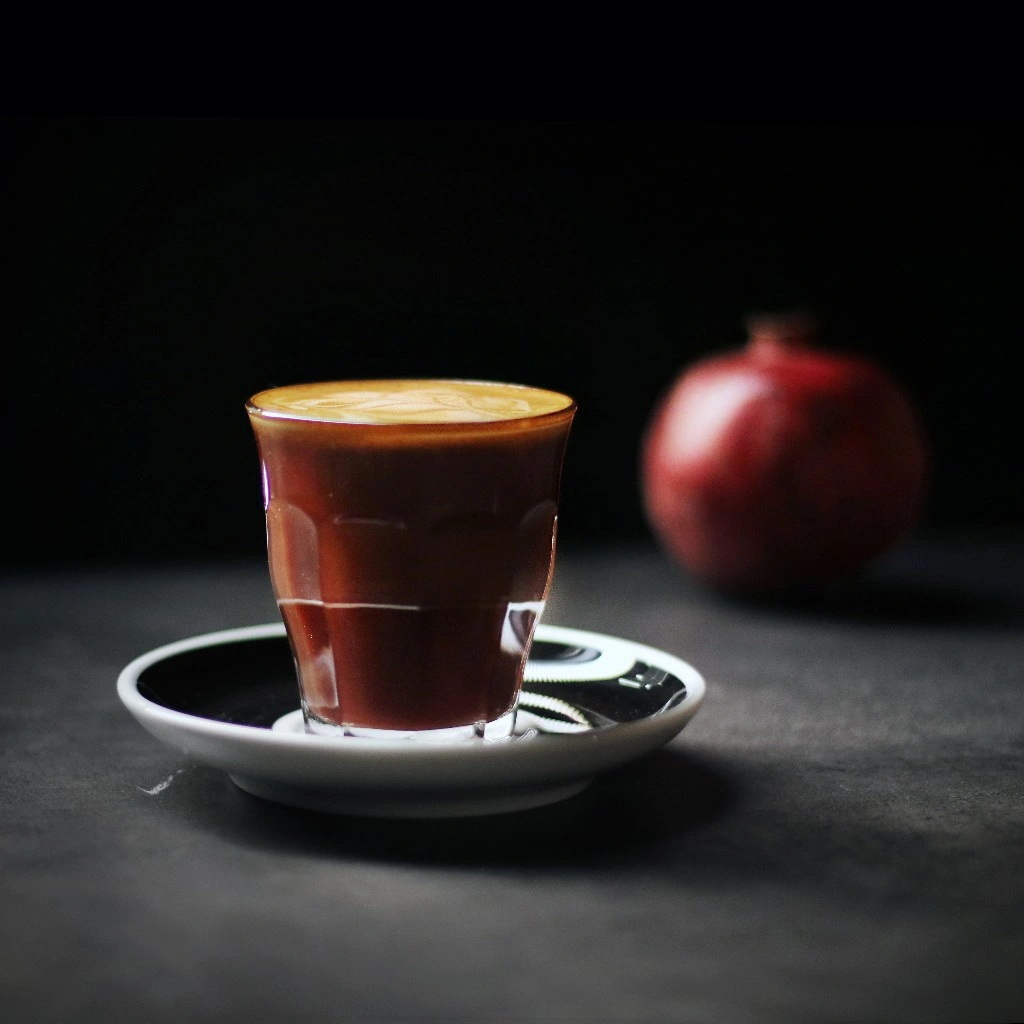
- Place of origin: Ukraine
- Created by: Vadym Granovskiy
- Invented: 2016
- Main ingredients: Espresso, steamed pomegranate and orange juice

A flat red is a coffee drink consisting of espresso and steamed orange and pomegranate juice. The hot beverage combines the intensity of coffee with the refreshing acidity of citrus and pomegranate notes, producing a balanced flavor profile and a distinctive aroma. It contains no added sugar and no milk.

The flat red was created in 2016 by the award-winning Ukrainian barista and founder Vadym Granovskiy in Kyiv.

== Description ==
Orange and pomegranate are freshly pressed, filtered to remove pulp, and blended. The juice mix is heated to approximately 55 °C (131°F) and steamed in the same manner as milk for espresso-based drinks. About 110 ml (5.4 US fl oz) of the juice mix is added to a freshly brewed double espresso, resulting in a beverage with a total volume of around 160 ml. The flat red is served in a glass.
