= New Vienna =

New Vienna may refer to:

- New Vienna, Iowa, U.S.
- New Vienna, Ohio, U.S.
- New Vienna, a 2025 album by Keith Jarrett

== See also ==
- Vienna (disambiguation)
