= Vienne =

Vienne may refer to:

== Places ==
- Vienne (department), a department of west-central France named after the river Vienne
- Vienne, Isère, a city in east-central France, department of Isère, on the Rhône river
- Vienne-en-Arthies, a village in the French department of Val-d'Oise
- Vienne-en-Bessin, a village in the French department of Calvados
- Vienne-en-Val, a village in the French department of Loiret
- Vienne-la-Ville, a village in the French department of Marne
- Vienne-le-Château, a village in the French department of Marne
- Vienne, local name for Blois-Vienne, the southern part of the city of Blois, France
- The French name for Vienna, the capital of Austria

== Rivers ==
- Vienne (river), a river in western-central France
- Vienne (Normandy), a small river in Normandy, France

== People ==
- Christiane Vienne (born 1951), Belgian politician and a member of the Parti Socialiste
- Fabien Vienne (1925–2016) French architect
- Jean de Vienne (1341–1396), French knight, general and admiral during the Hundred Years' War
- Theodore Vienne (1864–1921), French sports entrepreneur and co-founder of the Paris-Roubaix cycle race
- Count of Vienne, many having Vienne as part of their common name
- Dauphin of Viennois, many having Vienne as part of their common name
- Saints, bishops and archbishops of the Ancient Diocese of Vienne, many having Vienne as part of their common name

== Other uses ==
- Council of Vienne, a Roman Catholic Church council that met between 1311 and 1312 in Vienne, Isère
- French cruiser Jean de Vienne, a World War II French light cruiser named after Jean de Vienne
- French frigate Jean de Vienne (D643), an anti-submarine frigate of the French Navy named after Jean de Vienne, commissioned in 1984
- Café Vienne, a French term for the coffee beverage espresso con panna (Vienne refers to the French name of Vienna, Austria)

== See also ==
- Vienna
- Viennetta
