= Turkish Siege of Vienna =

Turkish Siege of Vienna may refer to:

- First Turkish Siege of Vienna (1529), first Ottoman attempt to conquer Vienna
- Second Turkish Siege of Vienna (1683), second Ottoman attempt to conquer Vienna

== See also ==
- Siege of Vienna (disambiguation)
