= Caffè macchiato =

Espresso coffee drink with a small amount of milk

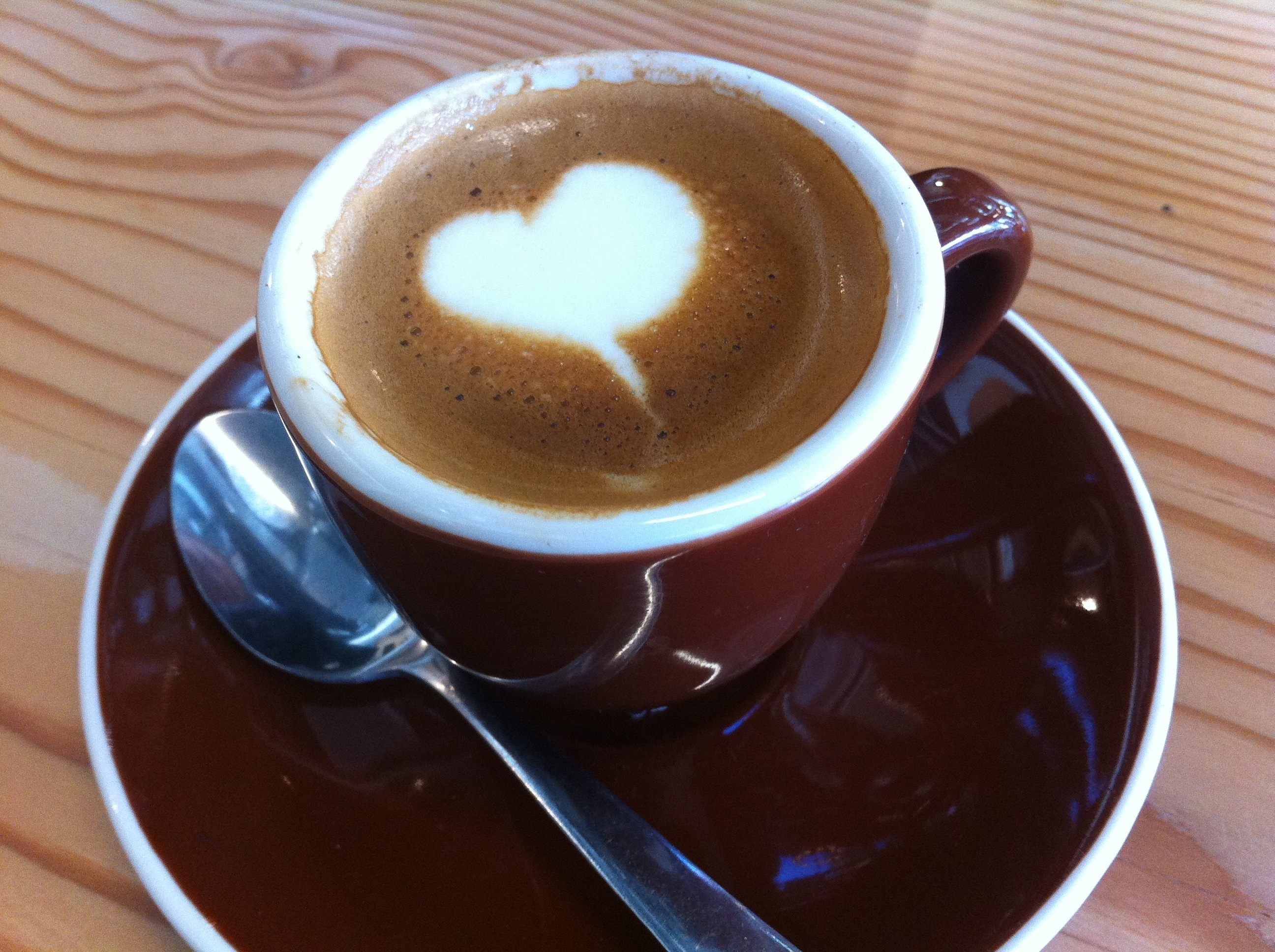
- Origin: Italy
- Color: Shades of brown, white
- Ingredients: Espresso, milk

Caffè macchiato (Italian: [kafˈfɛ mmakˈkjaːto]; sometimes called espresso macchiato and sometimes shortened to just macchiato in English) is an espresso with a small amount of milk, usually foamed. In Italian, macchiato means 'stained' or 'spotted', so the literal translation of caffè macchiato is 'stained coffee' or 'marked coffee'.

== History ==
The origin of the name macchiato stems from the difference between an espresso and an espresso with a tiny bit of milk in it; the latter was "marked". The idea is reflected in the Portuguese name for the drink: café pingado, meaning 'coffee with a drop'.

== Preparation ==
Caffè macchiato has the highest ratio of espresso to milk of any drink made with those ingredients. The intent is that the milk moderates, rather than overwhelms, the taste of the coffee while adding a touch of sweetness. The drink is typically prepared by pouring a small amount of steamed milk directly into a single shot of espresso. One recipe calls for 5–10 grams (0.18–0.35 oz), about 1–2 teaspoons of milk, heated to 60–66 °C (140–150 °F).

== Outside Italy ==
In Australia, the drink is referred to simply as macchiato, often shortened to just "mac", and has some variants. A traditional long macchiato is usually a double-shot of espresso with a dash of textured milk (milk that is frothed before being heated, whereas steamed milk is frothed and heated at the same time) and most of the glass left empty. In Perth, a "long mac topped up" is usually a double-shot of espresso with the glass filled with textured milk. In Melbourne, a macchiato is a double-shot of espresso, the glass then half-filled with water and a dash of textured milk on top.

== See also ==
Media related to Macchiato at Wikimedia Commons

- List of coffee drinks
- Latte macchiato, a shot of espresso in steamed milk
