= Vienna Township =

Vienna Township may refer to the following places:

- Vienna Township, Grundy County, Illinois
- Vienna Township, Scott County, Indiana
- Vienna Township, Marshall County, Iowa
- Vienna Township, Kansas
- Vienna Township, Genesee County, Michigan (Vienna Charter Township, Michigan)
- Vienna Township, Montmorency County, Michigan
- Vienna Township, Rock County, Minnesota
- Vienna Township, Forsyth County, North Carolina
- Vienna Township, Trumbull County, Ohio

See also

- Vienna (disambiguation)
