= Walter G. Derthick =

American politician

Walter G. Derthick was a Republican member of the Wisconsin State Assembly in 1882. Previously, he had been a member of the town board (similar to city council) of Spring Prairie, Wisconsin from 1868 to 1871 and Assessor of Spring Prairie in 1881. Derthick was born on December 6, 1838, in Shalersville Township, Portage County, Ohio.
