= Latte macchiato =

Hot espresso drink with milk

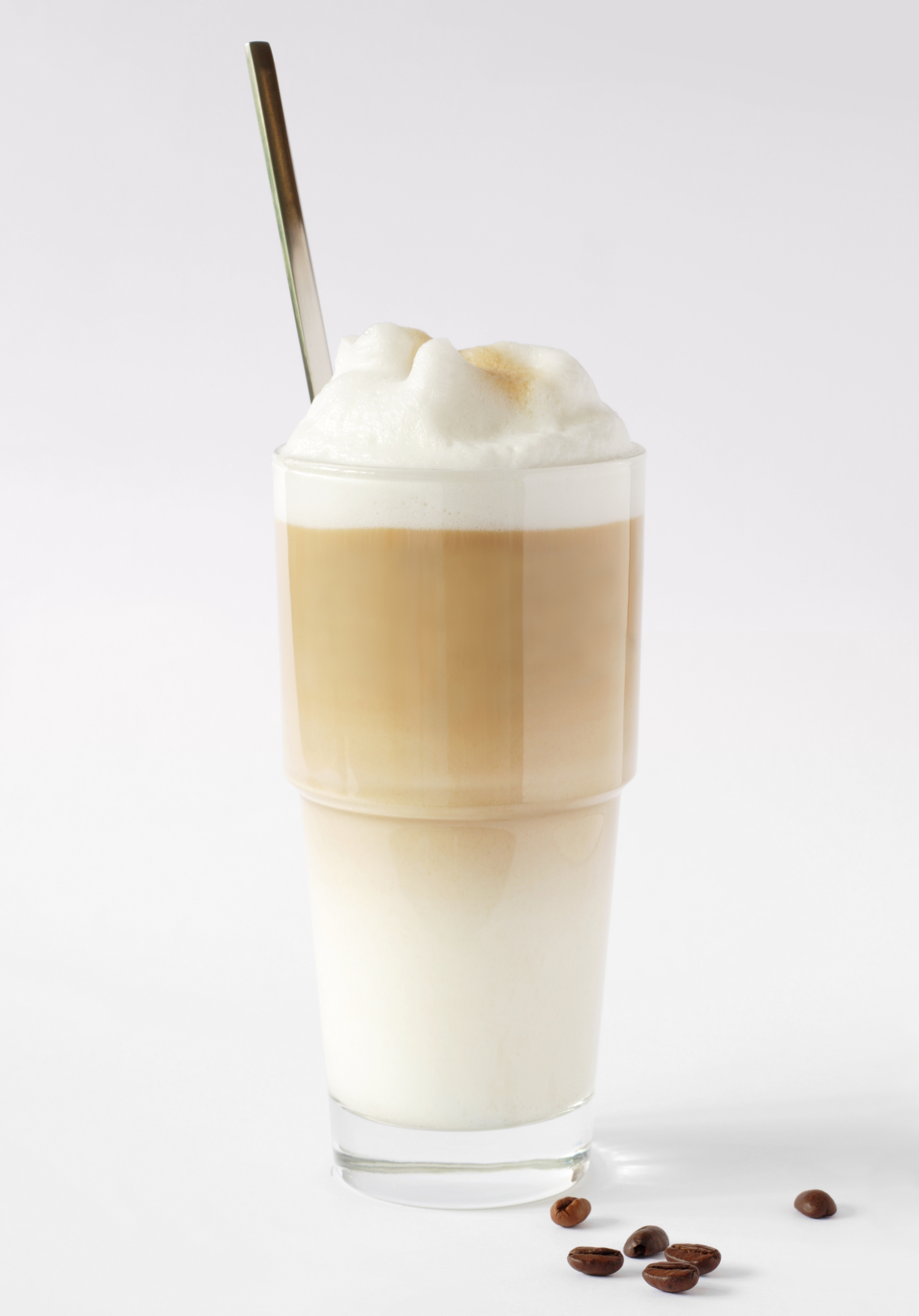
A glass of latte macchiato

Latte macchiato (Italian: [ˈlatte makˈkjaːto]) is a coffee beverage. The name is Italian for 'stained milk', referring to the way the drink is prepared, by pouring a shot of espresso into steamed milk. It derives from caffè macchiato, an older drink consisting of espresso "stained" with just a small amount of milk or cream.

== Preparation ==
Espresso may be brewed into a standard espresso cup or shot glass and then swiftly dumped in, or may be brewed into a specialized espresso brew pitcher, which makes pouring easier, particularly for layering.

== See also ==
- List of coffee drinks
- Caffè macchiato
