= Vienna station =

Vienna station may refer to:

== Railway stations ==
- Vienna Central Station or Wien Hauptbahnhof, the main station in Vienna, Austria
- Vienna station (VTA), a light rail station in Sunnyvale, California, US
- Vienna station (Washington Metro), a Washington Metro station in Fairfax County, Virginia, US
- Vienna Station (Warsaw), Poland, terminus of the Warsaw–Vienna railway

== Places ==
- Vienna Station, Kentucky or Calhoun, Kentucky

== See also ==
- Category:Railway stations in Vienna
- List of Vienna U-Bahn stations
