= Spring Prairie, Wisconsin =

- Town
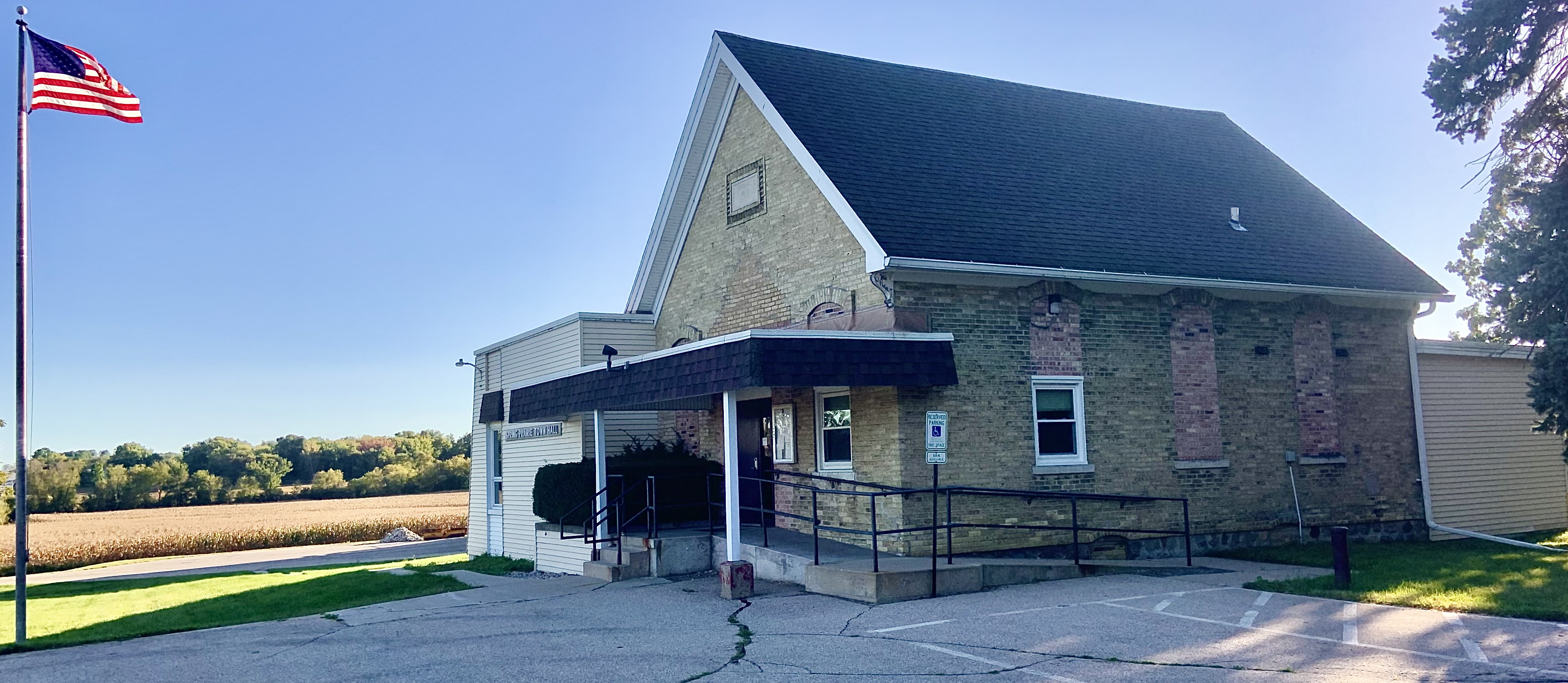
- Town hall

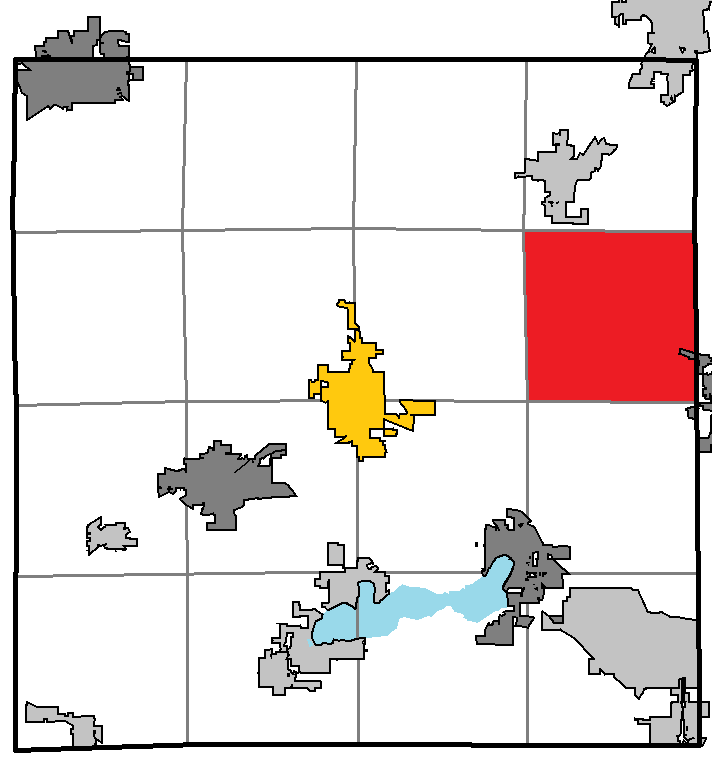
- Location of Spring Prairie, within Walworth County

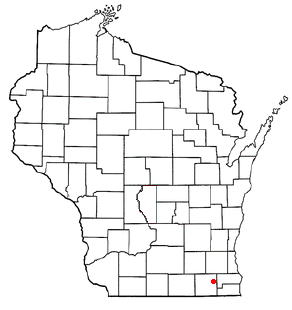
- Location of Spring Prairie, Wisconsin
- Coordinates: 42°43′1″N 88°21′34″W
- Country: United States
- State: Wisconsin
- County: Walworth

Area
  - Total: 35.8 sq mi (92.8 km^{2})
  - Land: 35.8 sq mi (92.6 km^{2})
  - Water: 0.077 sq mi (0.2 km^{2})
- Elevation: 909 ft (277 m)

Population (2020)
  - Total: 2,123
  - Density: 59/sq mi (22.6/km^{2})
- Time zone: UTC-6 (Central (CST))
  - Summer (DST): UTC-5 (CDT)
- Area code: 262
- FIPS code: 55-76175
- GNIS feature ID: 1584200
- Website: https://townofspringprairiewi.gov/

Spring Prairie is a town in Walworth County, Wisconsin, United States. The population was 2,123 at the 2020 census. The unincorporated communities of Spring Prairie and Voree are located in the town. The unincorporated communities of Honey Creek and Honey Lake are also located partially in the town.

== History ==
Spring Prairie was originally called Franklin. The name was changed when an early settler suggested naming the settlement after the natural springs that discharged into Spring Brook, a branch of Sugar Creek.

== Geography ==
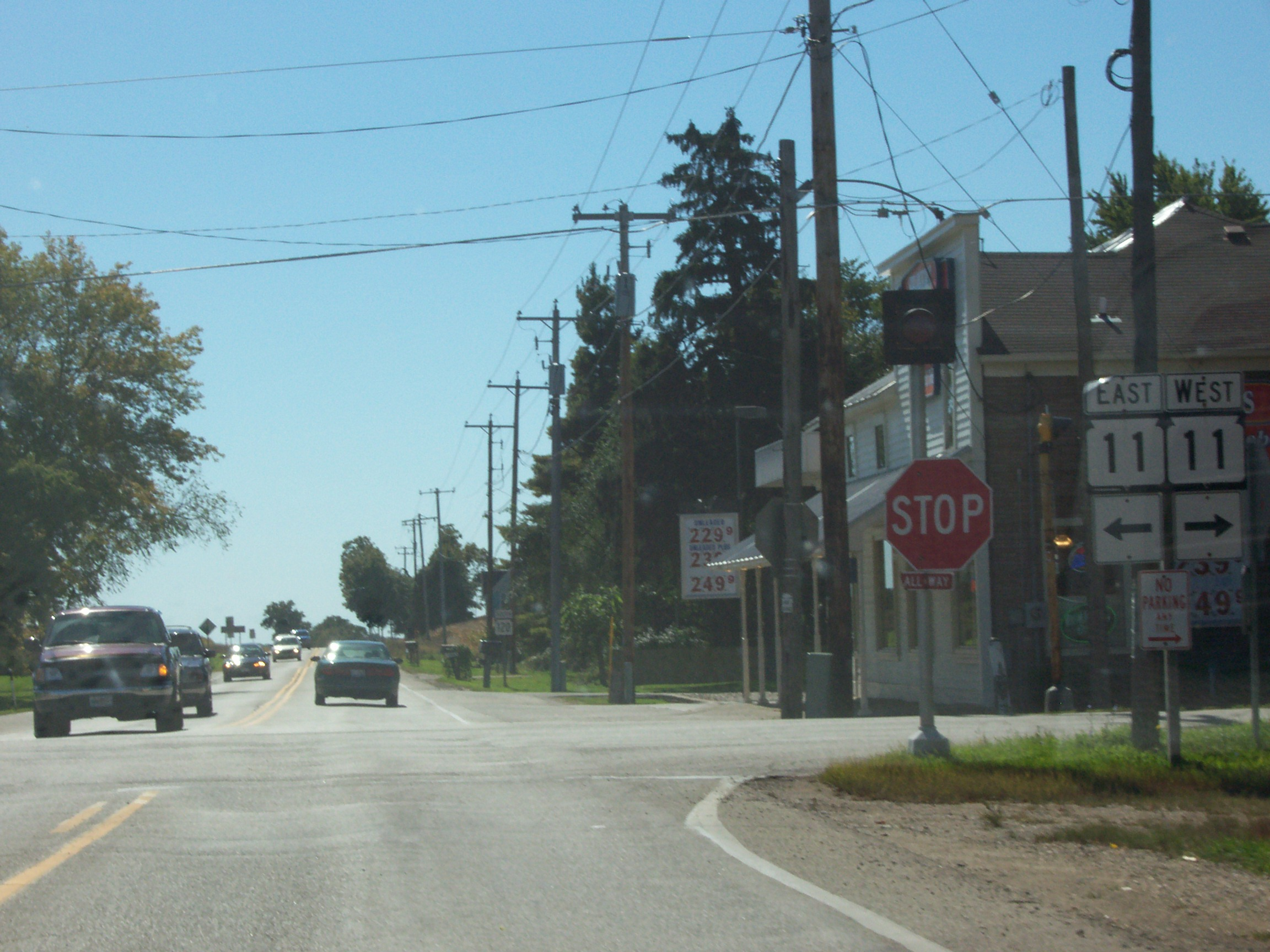
Intersection of Highways 11 and 120

According to the United States Census Bureau, the town has a total area of 35.8 square miles (92.8 km^{2}), of which 35.8 square miles (92.6 km^{2}) is land and 0.1 square mile (0.2 km^{2}) (0.22%) is water.

== Demographics ==
As of the census of 2000, there were 2,089 people, 726 households, and 590 families residing in the town. The population density was 58.4 people per square mile (22.6/km^{2}). There were 765 housing units at an average density of 21.4 per square mile (8.3/km^{2}). The racial makeup of the town was 97.75% White, 0.81% African American, 0.38% Native American, 0.19% Asian, 0.14% from other races, and 0.72% from two or more races. Hispanic or Latino of any race were 1.39% of the population.

There were 726 households, out of which 37.3% had children under the age of 18 living with them, 71.8% were married couples living together, 5.1% had a female householder with no husband present, and 18.6% were non-families. 13.9% of all households were made up of individuals, and 4.5% had someone living alone who was 65 years of age or older. The average household size was 2.88 and the average family size was 3.18.

In the town, the population was spread out, with 27.0% under the age of 18, 7.4% from 18 to 24, 28.5% from 25 to 44, 28.5% from 45 to 64, and 8.6% who were 65 years of age or older. The median age was 39 years. For every 100 females, there were 104.0 males. For every 100 females age 18 and over, there were 105.4 males.

The median income for a household in the town was $59,583, and the median income for a family was $61,563. Males had a median income of $43,355 versus $25,938 for females. The per capita income for the town was $22,471. About 1.9% of families and 3.1% of the population were below the poverty line, including 2.7% of those under age 18 and 3.5% of those age 65 or over.

== Notable people ==
- John Bell, legislator
- Henry Allen Cooper, U.S. Representative
- Walter G. Derthick, legislator
- Jacob Hamblin, explorer, missionary, peacemaker to the Indians of the Southwestern United States
- Orris Pratt, farmer and legislator
- Samuel Pratt, farmer and legislator
- Christian Keyser Preus, educator and Lutheran minister
- Herman Amberg Preus, President of the Synod of the Norwegian Evangelical Lutheran Church in America
- Rollin D. Salisbury, geologist
