= Spring Prairie (community), Wisconsin =

Spring Prairie, Wisconsin
- Unincorporated community
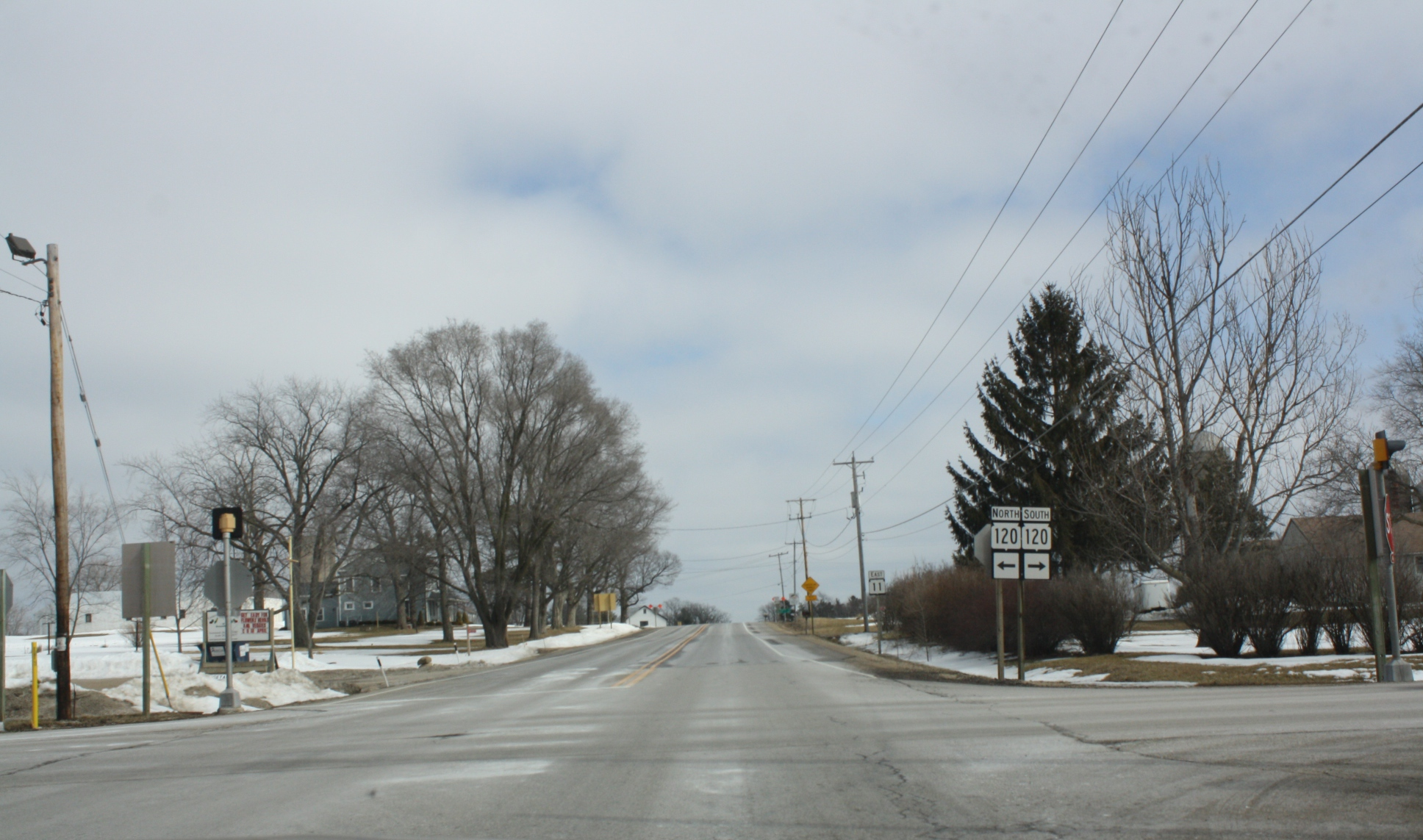
- The intersection of WIS 11 and WIS 120 in Spring Prairie

- Location within Wisconsin Location within the United States
- Coordinates: 42°41′29″N 88°24′15″W
- Country: United States
- State: Wisconsin
- County: Walworth
- Elevation: 1,014 ft (309 m)
- Time zone: UTC-6 (Central (CST))
  - Summer (DST): UTC-5 (CDT)
- Zip: 53174
- Area code: 262
- GNIS feature ID: 1574692

Spring Prairie (also Franklin) is an unincorporated community located in the town of Spring Prairie, Walworth County, Wisconsin, United States. Spring Prairie is located at the intersection of Wisconsin Highway 11 (WIS 11) and WIS 120, 7.25 miles (11.67 km) east of Elkhorn.

== Images ==
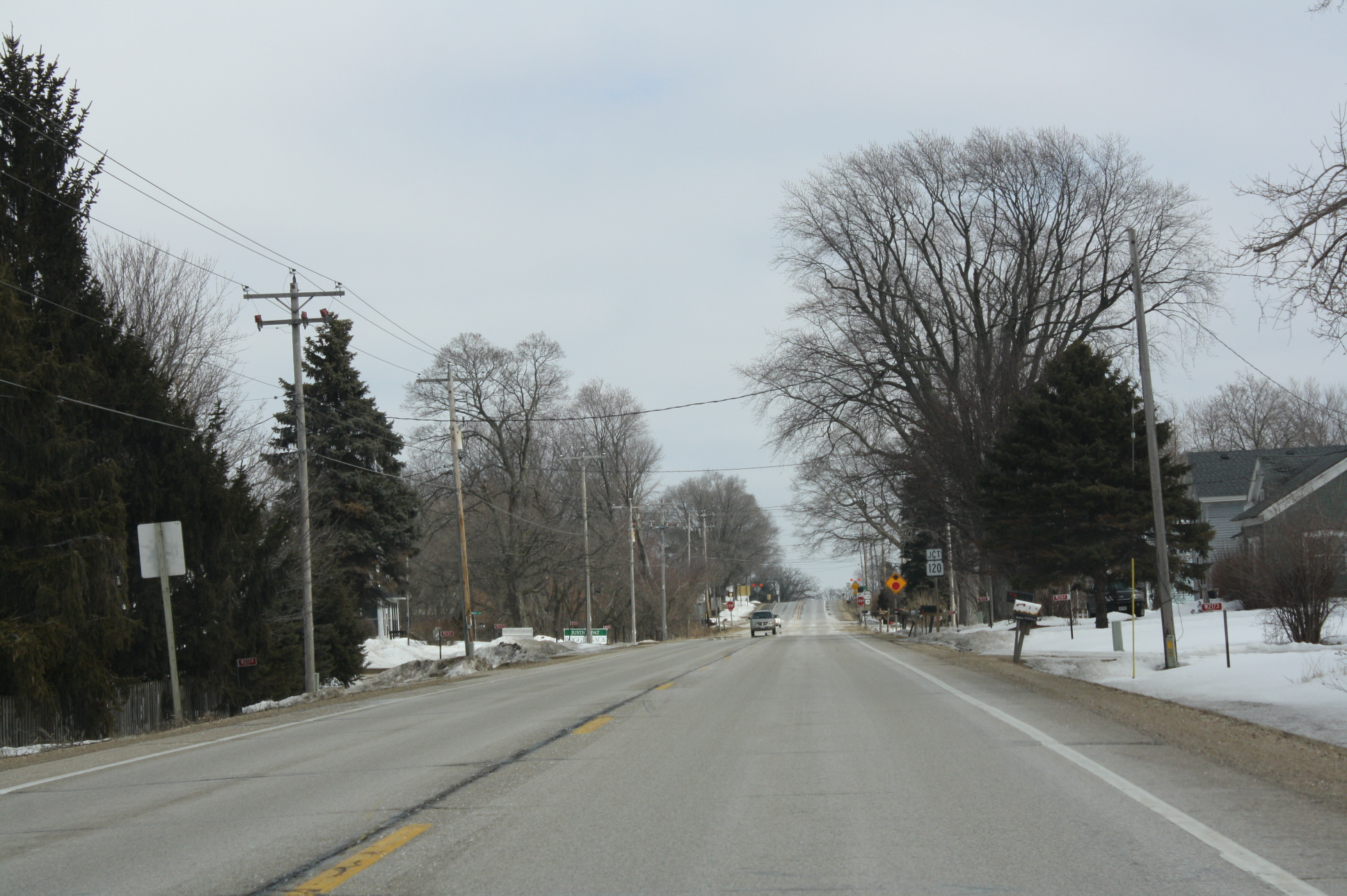
Looking east at Spring Prairie

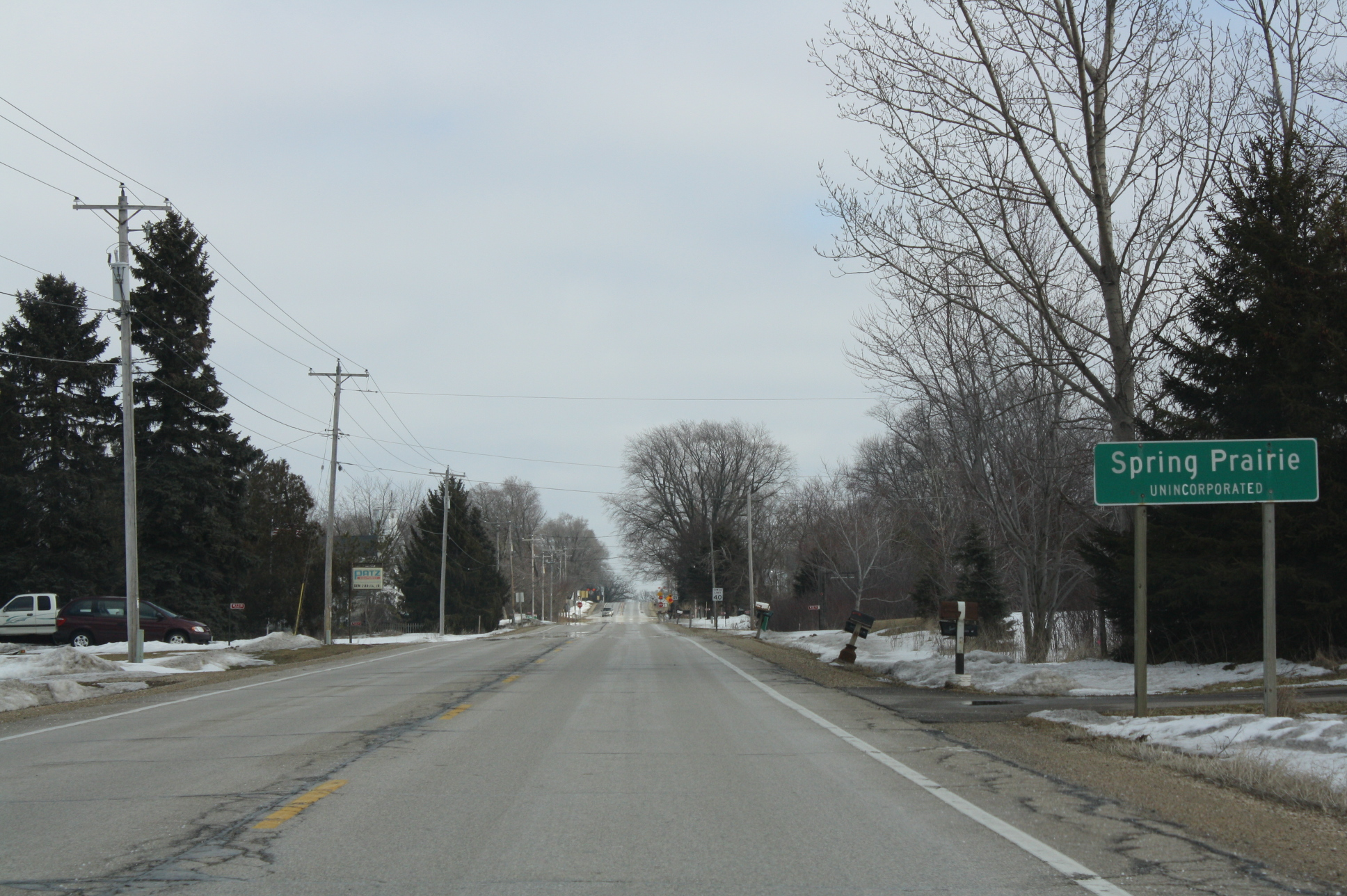
Looking east at the sign for Spring Prairie on WIS 11
