= Honey Lake, Wisconsin =

- Unincorporated community
- Location within Wisconsin Location within the United States
- Coordinates: 42°42′57″N 88°18′21″W
- Country: United States
- State: Wisconsin
- Counties: Racine, Walworth
- Elevation: 774 ft (236 m)
- Time zone: UTC-6 (Central (CST))
  - Summer (DST): UTC-5 (CDT)
- Area code: 262
- GNIS feature ID: 1566657

Honey Lake (also Vienna) is an unincorporated community located in Racine and Walworth Counties, Wisconsin, United States.

The Walworth County portion is located within the town of Spring Prairie, and the Racine County portion is part of the village of Rochester.
