= Wien (disambiguation) =

Wien is the German language name for Vienna, the capital and federal state of Austria.

Wien may also refer to:

== Surname ==
- Lawrence Wien (1905–1988), American lawyer and real estate investor
- Max Wien (1866–1938), German physicist, inventor of the Wien bridge
- Noel Wien (1899–1977), American aviator
- Phillip Wien (1913–1981), British judge
- Wilhelm Wien (1864–1928), German physicist, formulator of Wien's Law

== Places in the United States ==
- Wien, Missouri, a community in the United States
- Wien, Wisconsin, a town
- Wien (community), Wisconsin, an unincorporated community

== Other uses ==
- Theater an der Wien, a theater in Vienna located at the former river Wien
- Wien (river), in Vienna, Austria
- Wien Air Alaska, American airline 1927–1985
- Wien International Scholarship, a scholarship instituted by Brandeis University
- Wien bridge oscillator, a type of electronic oscillator
- Wien's displacement law, law of physics
- SMS Wien, an Austro-Hungarian coastal defense ship

== See also ==
- Wiener (disambiguation)
