= Siege of Vienna =

Sieges of Vienna may refer to:

- Siege of Vienna (1485), Hungarian victory during the Austro–Hungarian War.
- Siege of Vienna (1529), or First Turkish Siege of Vienna, the first Ottoman attempt to conquer Vienna.
- Battle of Vienna, 1683, or Second Turkish Siege of Vienna, the second Ottoman attempt to conquer Vienna.
- Capture of Vienna (1805), French occupation during the War of the Third Coalition
- Capture of Vienna (1809), French occupation during the War of the Fifth Coalition
- Vienna Uprising (1848), Habsburg siege of the city
- Vienna Offensive (1945), Soviet offensive.

== See also ==
- Turkish Siege of Vienna (disambiguation)
