= Espresso con panna =

Single or double shot of espresso topped with whipped cream

Espresso con panna (lit. 'espresso with cream') is a single or double shot of espresso topped with whipped cream. In France and in the United Kingdom it is known as café viennois.
