= DeLclima =

Italian company

- Type: Public
- Traded as: BIT: DLC
- Industry: Heating, Ventilating and Air Conditioning (HVAC) Systems
- Founded: 2012; 14 years ago
- Headquarters: Treviso, Italy
- Key people: Giuseppe De'Longhi (president); Carlo Grossi (CEO)
- Products: Chillers, Heat pumps, Air handling, terminal units, Control systems, rooftops and other packaged units, close controls
- Revenue: € 375,3 M (2012)
- Number of employees: 1883 (2012)
- Website: www.del-clima.com

Mitsubishi Electric Hydronics & IT Cooling Systems S.p.A., commonly referred to as DeLclima, is an Italian company designing and producing HVAC and HPAC units through Climaveneta and RC GROUP. DeLclima also operates in the radiator business through DL Radiators.

== History ==
The company, headquartered in Treviso, was established in 2012 as a demerger from De'Longhi. DeLclima was listed on the Milan Stock Exchange from 2012 until February 2016, when it was delisted following the acquisition by Mitsubishi Electric at the end of 2015. Climaveneta, RC Group, and DeLclima Finance merged into Mitsubishi Electric Hydronics & IT Cooling Systems S.p.A. as of January 1, 2017. The new company also integrated the entire staff of MELCO Hydronics and IT Cooling S.p.A., the former corporate operational entity, previously known as DeLclima S.p.A.
