= Climaveneta =

Italian HVAC and HPAC manufacturer

Climaveneta Spa
- Company type: Public
- Industry: Heating, Ventilating and Air Conditioning (HVAC) Systems
- Founded: 1971; 55 years ago
- Headquarters: Bassano del Grappa, Italy
- Key people: Maurizio Marchesini (CEO)
- Products: Chillers, Heat pumps, multi-purpose units, Air handling units, AHU, terminal units, Control systems, rooftops and other packaged units, close controls
- Revenue: € 295 M (2014)
- Number of employees: 1,674 (2014)
- Website: www.climaveneta.com/EN/

Climaveneta Spa, a group company of Mitsubishi Electric, is an Italian HVAC and HPAC manufacturer based in Bassano del Grappa, Vicenza.

== History ==
In 2000 Climaveneta started participating in Eurovent certification, among the initiators, aligning Europe with the United States.

== Products and services ==
Climaveneta produces chillers and heat pumps, air handling units, terminal units, and control systems.
