= Tokyo Building =

The Tokyo Building
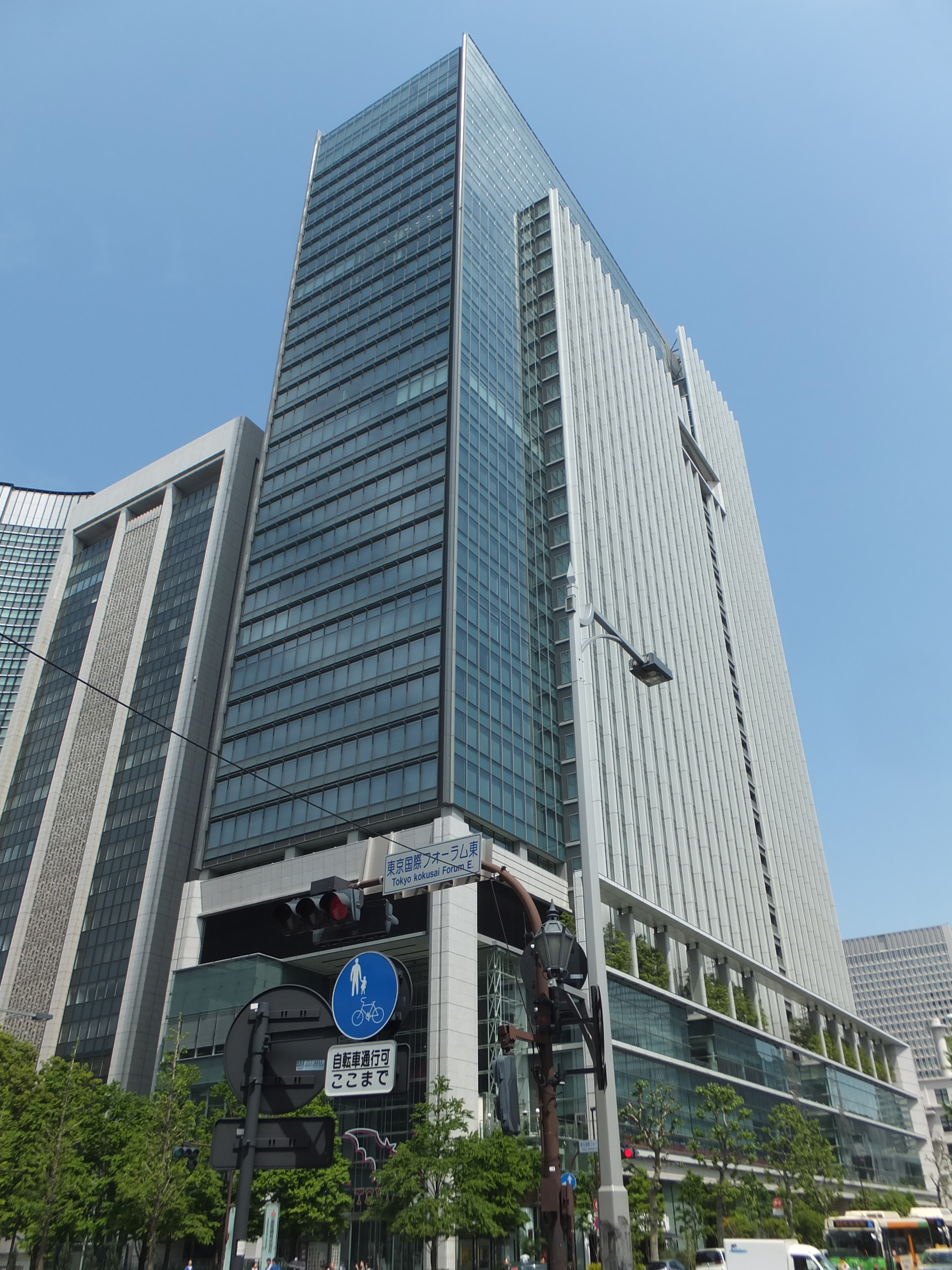

General information
- Type: Offices
- Location: 7-3, Marunouchi 2-chome, Chiyoda-ku, Tokyo, Japan
- Completed: October 2005
- Owner: Mitsubishi Estate
- Operator: JR East Building Co., Ltd.

Height
- Antenna spire: Maximum eaves height 164.1m, Maximum height 164.0m

Technical details
- Floor count: 33 stories above ground, 4 stories below ground, 1 roof structure
- Floor area: 1,606,896.79sq.ft. (Gross); 880,375.56sq.ft. (Net)
- Lifts/elevators: 38 (passenger), 5 (freight)

Design and construction
- Architect: Mitsubishi Jisho Sekkei Inc.
- Developer: Mitsubishi Estate

The Tokyo Building is an office building located in Tokyo, Japan.

The Tokyo Building is primarily used for offices and serves as the headquarters of the following companies:

- Mitsubishi Electric
- JPMorgan Chase
- Mitsubishi Shoji UBS Reality
- Azbil
- Tanaka Kikinzoku Group

It also contains the Tokia retail and dining centre and the Cotton Club nightclub on its lower floors.

== Photos ==
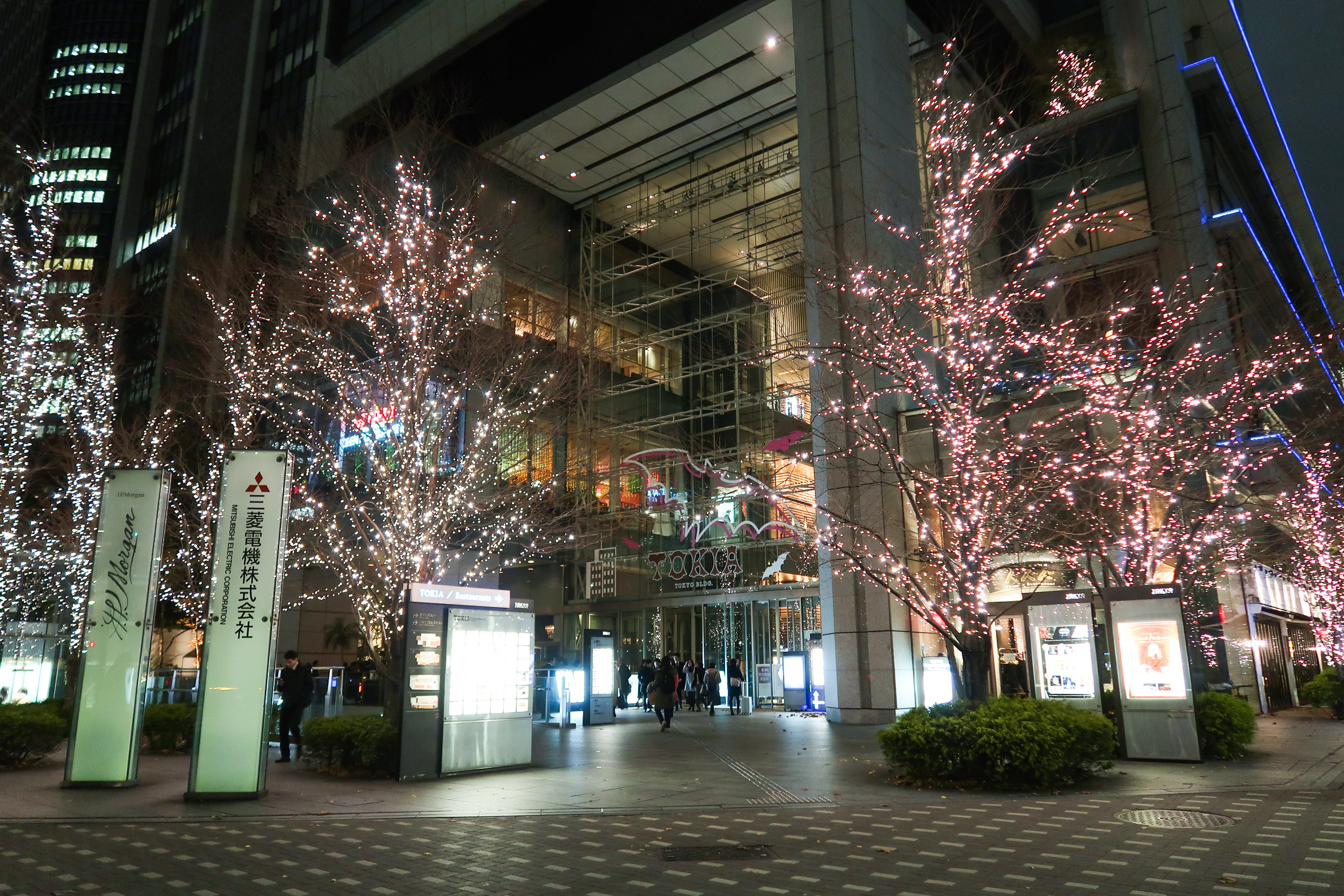
Entrance Plaza

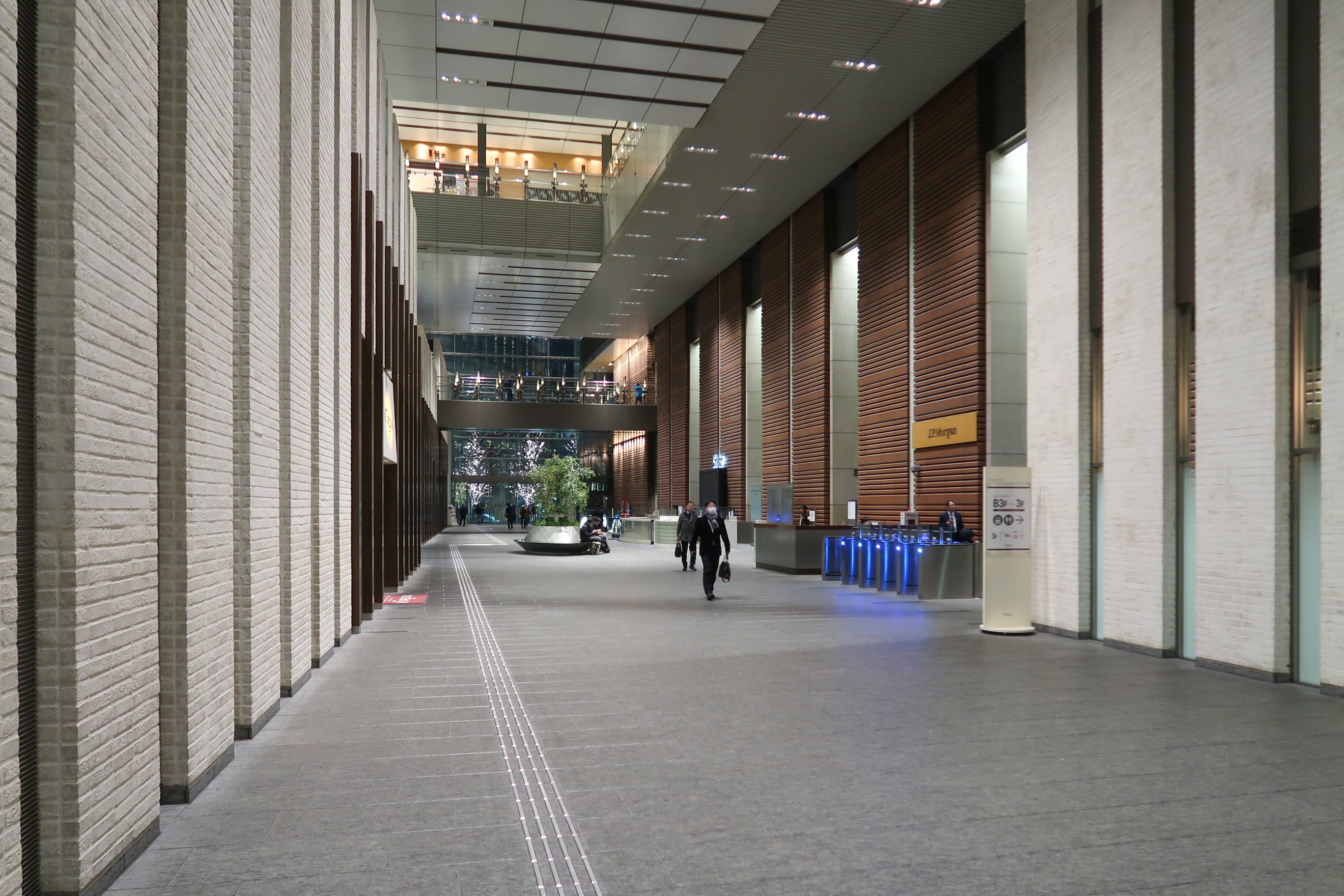
Office Lobby

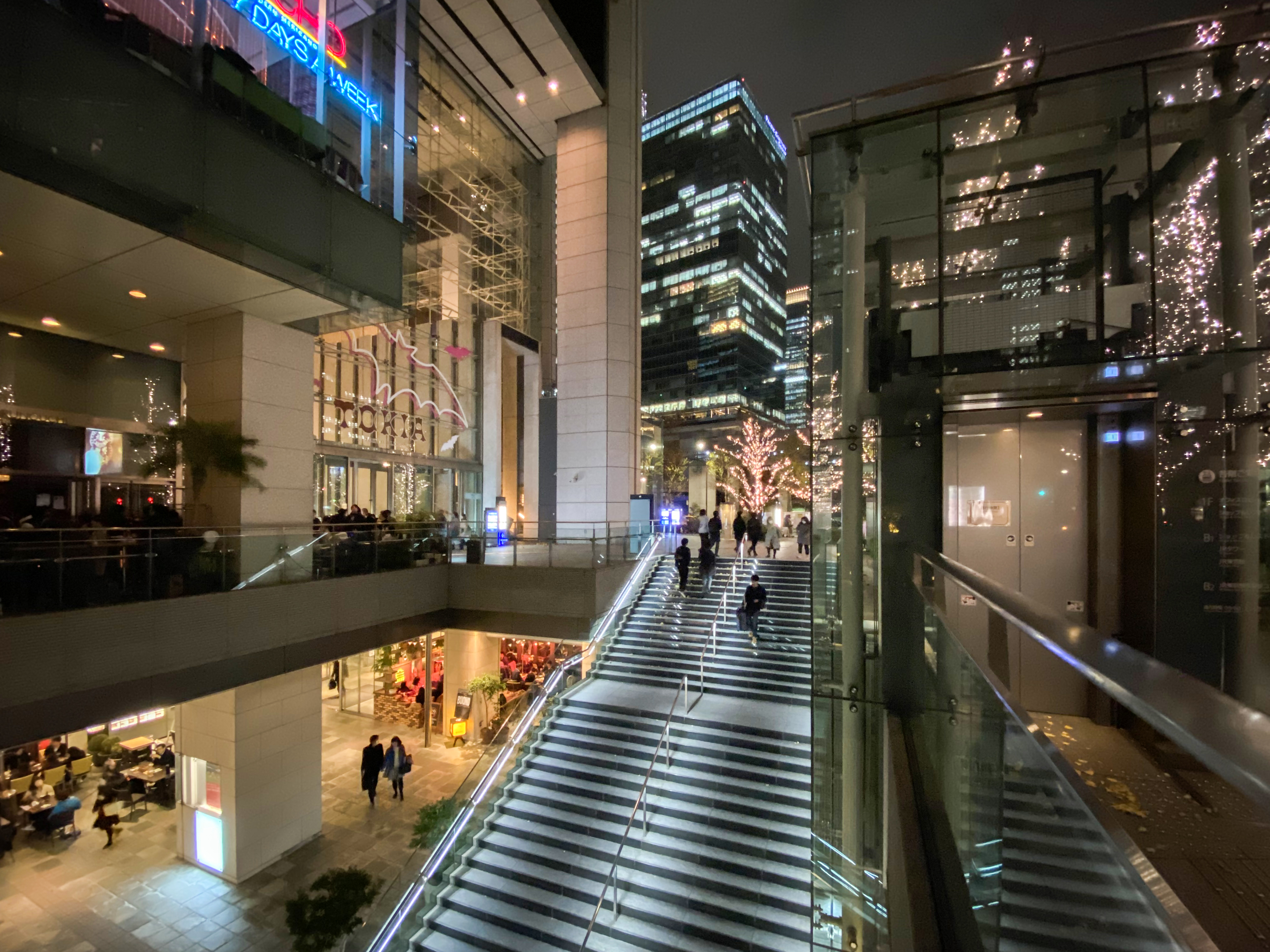
Sunken Plaza

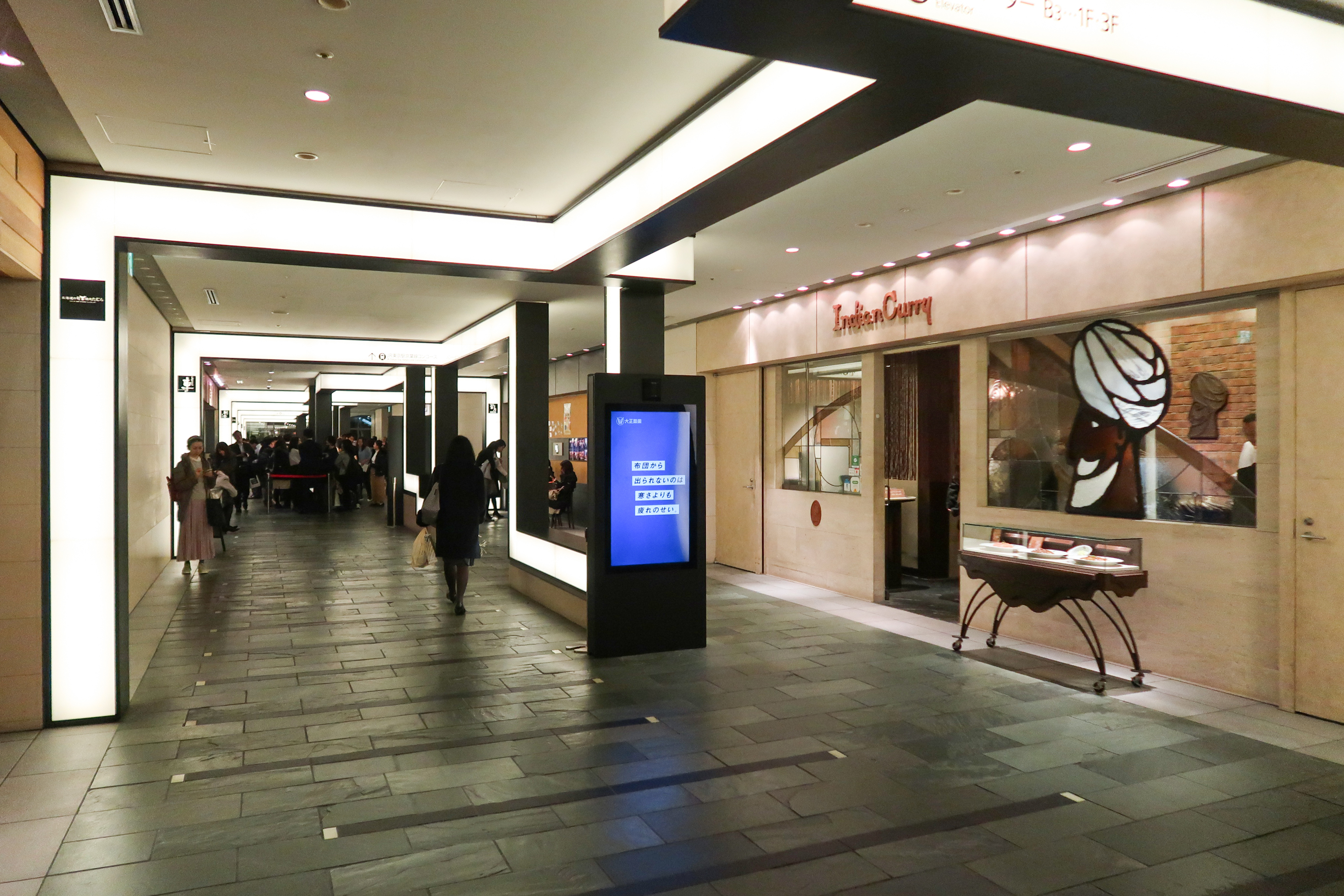
Basement Restaurants

== See also ==
- List of tallest buildings and structures in Tokyo
