= Tanaka Kikinzoku =

Japanese manufacturer

Tanaka Holdings Co., Ltd.

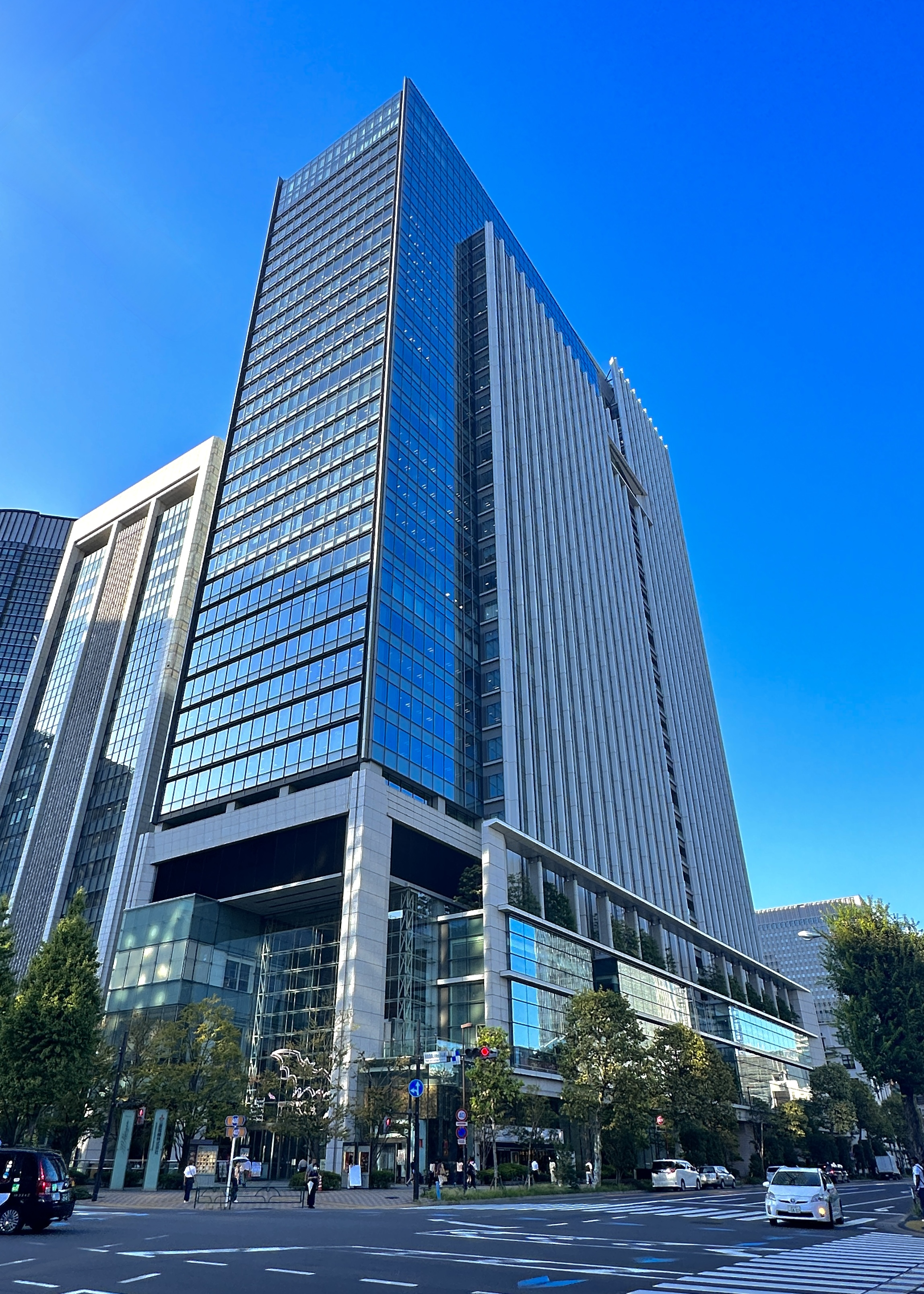
- Native name: TANAKAホールディングス株式会社
- Company type: Private (K.K)
- Industry: Precious metals
- Founded: 1885; 141 years ago
- Founder: Tanaka Umekichi
- Headquarters: Tokyo Building, Marunouchi, Chiyoda-ku, Tokyo 100-6422, Japan
- Area served: Worldwide
- Key people: Akira Tanae (CEO)
- Products: Industrial materials; Precious metal processing
- Revenue: JPY 976.6 billion (FY 2017) (US$ 9.2 billion) (FY 2017)
- Number of employees: 5,034 (consolidated, as of March 31, 2018)
- Website: Official website

The Tanaka Kikinzoku Group, founded in 1885, is a Japanese manufacturer of precious metals materials focusing mainly on products for the electronics, semiconductor and automotive industries. Tanaka's European subsidiary is Tanaka Kikinzoku International (Europe) GmbH in Frankfurt, Germany and its US subsidiary is Tanaka Kikinzoku International (America) Inc. in Chicago, United States.

The name Tanaka Kikinzoku (Pronunciation according to IPA: [ˈtanaka kiˈkinzokɯ]) traces back to the owners' family name "Tanaka" (田中) and the Japanese word for precious metals "Kikinzoku" (貴金属).

According to its company information, Tanaka leads the world market for bonding wire and catalysts for PEM fuel cells.

== History ==
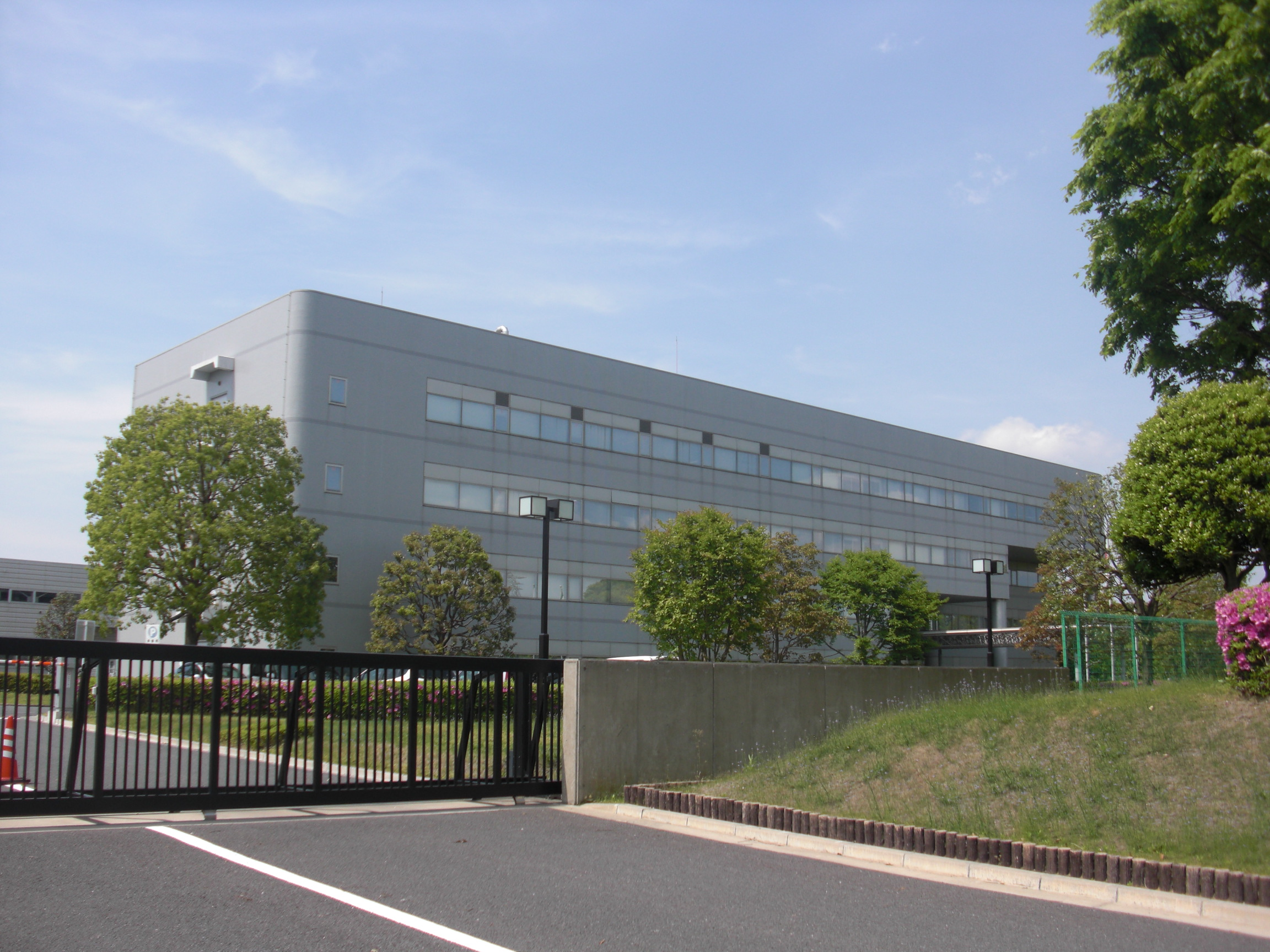
Tsukuba Technical Centre (TKK)

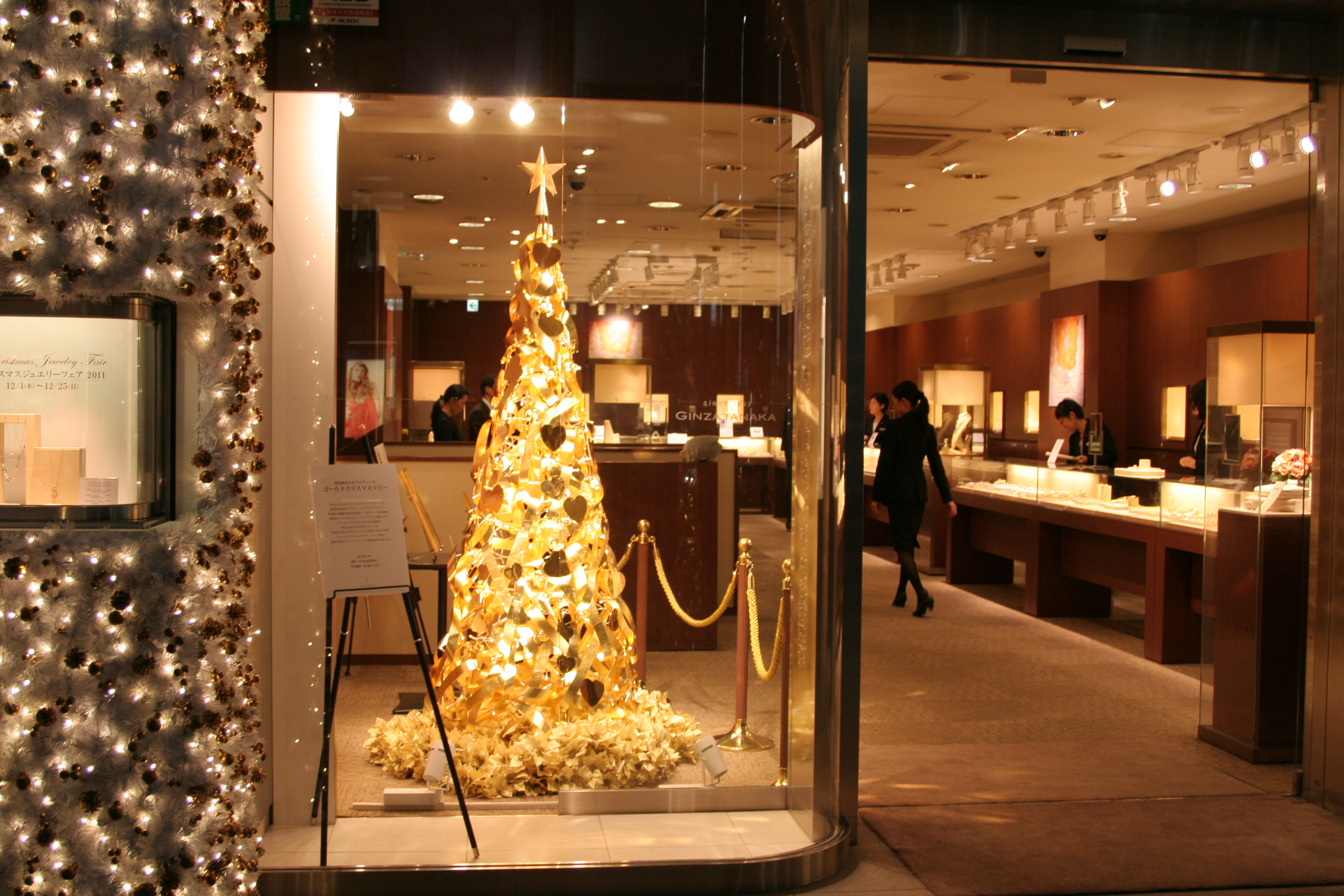
Main store of Ginza Tanaka in the Tokyo shopping district Ginza

=== 1884-1924 Foundation: Meiji and Taisho Period ===
Tanaka Kikinzoku was originally founded as a monetary exchange firm but became known as a company which connected manufacturing industries with platinum materials. Tanaka engaged in platinum metal recovery and the company was the first fabricator of platinum fine filament wire in Japan. During the Taisho period and early Showa period, the widespread modernization of Japan's industries saw the development of Tanaka's research and manufacture of industrial precious metals products.

=== 1925-1964 Showa Period: Second World War and Period of High Economic Growth until 1964 ===
Under a policy of "National Wealth", the early Showa period was strongly influenced by the Japanese military. During the Second World War, the company was under the administration of the Army. As it was not permitted to engage in trade with other industrialized nations, Tanaka Kikinzoku was forced to promote greater domestic reliance and develop various technologies for domestic consumption.

Later, products that contributed to Japan's postwar economic recovery occupied a large share of the industry, such as electrical contacts for power generation, nozzles for the synthetic fiber industry, and precious metals materials for electrical household appliances and radios.

=== 1965-2010 Beyond Showa Year 40: High Economic Growth to Present Day ===
After 1965, the Japanese economy rushed to build a foundation centered on the electrical, communications, petrochemical and electronics industries. During this period, the company built the foundation of the modern Tanaka Kikinzoku Group. This period of high economic growth brought increased income, widespread availability of consumer goods, and higher standard of living, all defining qualities of the wealthier society of modern Japan. The Second Gold Boom of 1981 resulted in an increased number of individual investors, bringing flourishing business to the company's retail shops.

== Customers ==
The majority of customers are companies from the electronics, semiconductor, automotive, aerospace, telecommunications, pharmaceutic and glass industries. However, the company does maintain retail operations, such as the Ginza Tanaka store in Tokyo.

== Products ==
Tanaka Kikinzoku primarily uses precious metals to manufacture materials and semi-fabricated products for industrial applications.

=== Sporting events ===
The company has produced the winner medals and finisher medals for every Tokyo Marathon since the first edition.
