= Mitsubishi Electric United States =

US subsidiary of Japanese electronics company

Mitsubishi Electric US Holdings, Inc.

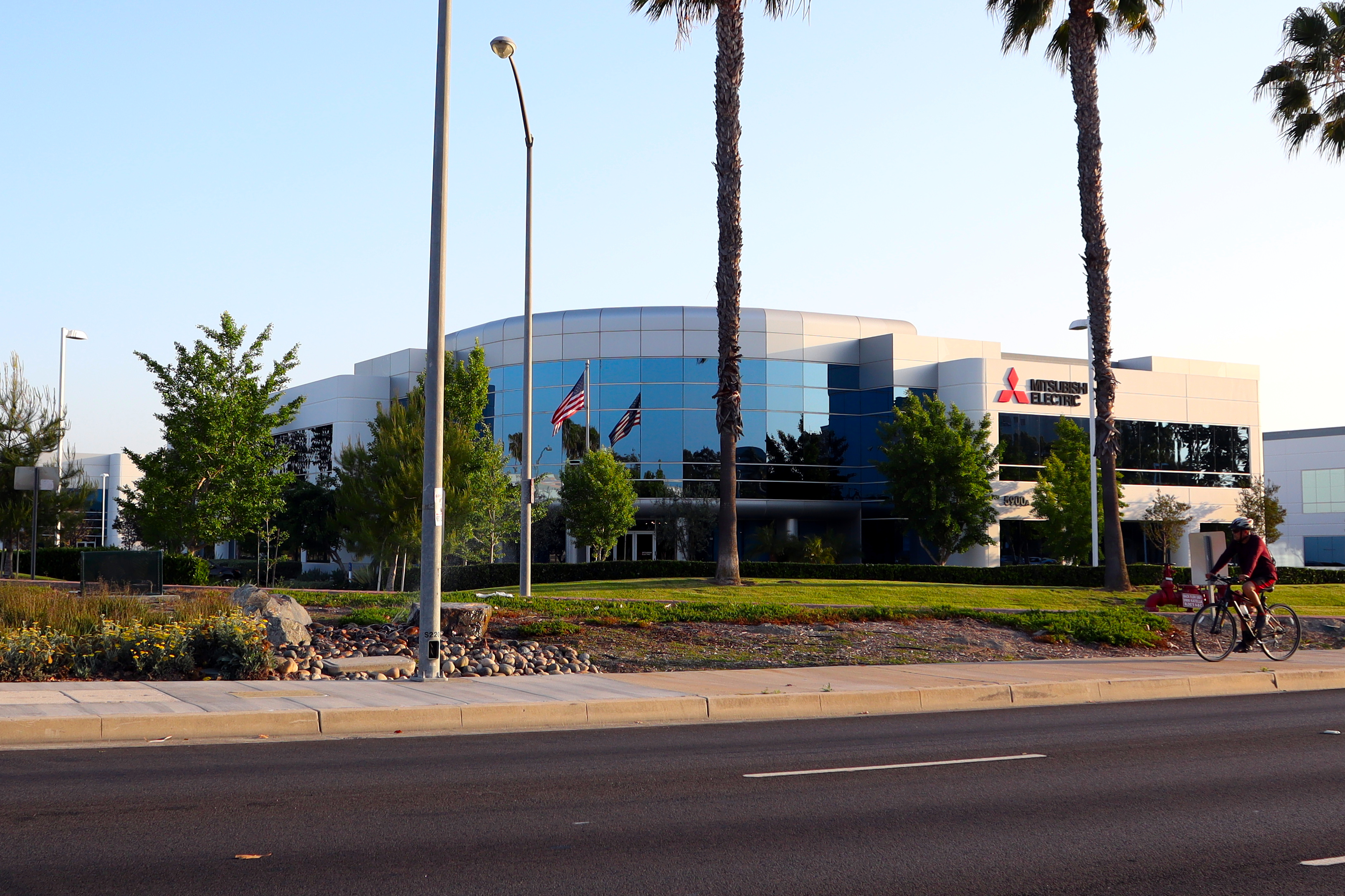
- Corporate headquarters
- Type: Subsidiary
- Founded: 2002; 24 years ago
- Headquarters: Cypress, California, United States
- Area served: United States
- Key people: Michael Corbo (president and CEO)
- Number of employees: Approximately 5,000
- Parent: Mitsubishi Electric Corporation
- Divisions: Mitsubishi Electric US; Elevator and Escalator Division; International Purchasing Division; Semiconductors and Devices Division; Visual and Imaging Systems Division; Heating & Air Conditioning Division; Space & Sensing Systems Division
- Subsidiaries: Mitsubishi Electric Automotive America; Mitsubishi Electric Automation; Mitsubishi Electric Power Products; Mitsubishi Electric Research Laboratories; Mitsubishi Electric Trane HVAC US
- Website: Mitsubishi Electric US

Mitsubishi Electric United States, Inc. is the principal subsidiary of Mitsubishi Electric Corporation in the United States. It is headquartered in Cypress, California and was incorporated in 2002 and its affiliates, have roughly 31 locations throughout North America with approximately 5,000 employees. Its main affiliate companies are: Mitsubishi Electric Power Products, Inc.; Mitsubishi Electric US, Inc.; Mitsubishi Electric Automotive America, Inc.; Mitsubishi Electric Automation, Inc.; and Mitsubishi Electric Research Laboratories, Inc.

Within Mitsubishi Electric US, Inc. are five separate divisions: Semiconductors and Devices Division, Elevator and Escalator Division, Mitsubishi Electric Heating & Air Conditioning, International Purchasing Division, and Visual and Imaging Systems Division.

Mitsubishi Electric US Holdings, Inc. and its group companies engage in engineering, manufacturing, sales and after-service in several business areas. Its principal products include semiconductor devices, automotive electrical components, elevators and escalators, cooling and heating products, industrial-use factory automation products, display walls, digital printers, digital signage, satellite systems, large-scale video displays and power generators, transmission and distribution equipment and railway systems.

== History ==
Mitsubishi Electric announced a major restructuring of its activities in the United States in October 1998, including the closure of its Astronet Corporation subsidiary and cellular mobile telephone unit, and a focusing on its digital television, computer hardware and building systems activities.

In June 2000, Mitsubishi Electric and NEC Corporation announced that they would combine their U.S. monitor manufacturing and marketing operations into a new 50:50 joint-venture company, NEC-Mitsubishi Electronics Display of America.

In May 2003, Mitsubishi Electric Power Products Inc. opened a new 50,000-square-foot (4,600 m^{2}) headquarters and manufacturing facility in Warrendale, Pennsylvania.

In May 2011, Mitsubishi Electric announced that it would exit the 65-inch (1,700 mm) and smaller categories of consumer television products in the U.S. and forming a new company based in Irvine, California, Mitsubishi Electric Visual Solutions America Inc., to focus on large-screen visual systems.

In April 2013, Mitsubishi Electric Power Products, Inc. opened a 350,000 square-foot power transformer factory in Memphis, Tennessee, built at a cost of $200 million. and shipped its first transformer in December 2014.

In April 2014, Mitsubishi Electric formed the Visual and Imaging Systems Division to market and support display walls and imaging products. Mitsubishi Electric US ceased the sale of photovoltaic modules in the U.S. in 2017.

In January 2018, the company acquired the power device distribution business of Powerex, Inc., a joint venture of Japan-based Mitsubishi Electric Corporation and General Electric Company, and rolled it into its Semiconductor Division, which was renamed the Semiconductors and Devices Division. That month, Mitsubishi Electric also announced an agreement to enter into a 50-50 joint venture with Ingersoll-Rand to market, distribute, and support zoned comfort solutions and variable refrigerant flow systems in the U.S. and select countries in Latin America.

In December 2019, Hyosung Heavy Industries announced that it would purchase Mitsubishi's transformer factory in Memphis for USD 46.5 million.

== Products ==
Mitsubishi Electric United States' principal products include:

- Air Conditioning and Heating
- Automotive Electronics and Electrical Components
- Building Automation Systems
- Commercial Hand Dryers
- Display Walls
- Elevators and Escalators
- Factory Automation Equipment
- Imaging Products
- Photographic and Thermal Printers
- Power Transmission and Distribution Equipment
- Rail Transit Systems
- Robotics
- Semiconductors and Devices
- Stadium and Arena Displays
- Uninterruptible Power Supplies
- Space & Sensing Systems
