= Mitsubishi Electric Hydronics & IT Cooling Systems =

Italian company hydronic systems for air conditioning and IT Cooling

- Formerly: DeLclima
- Company type: Private
- Industry: Heating, Ventilating and Air Conditioning (HVAC) Systems
- Founded: January 1, 2017; 9 years ago
- Headquarters: Bassano del Grappa, Italy
- Key people: Wataru Tsuruta (CEO & General Manager)
- Products: Chillers, Heat pumps, Air handling, terminal units, Control systems, rooftops and other packaged units, close controls
- Revenue: € 278, M (2020)
- Number of employees: 897
- Website: www.melcohit.com

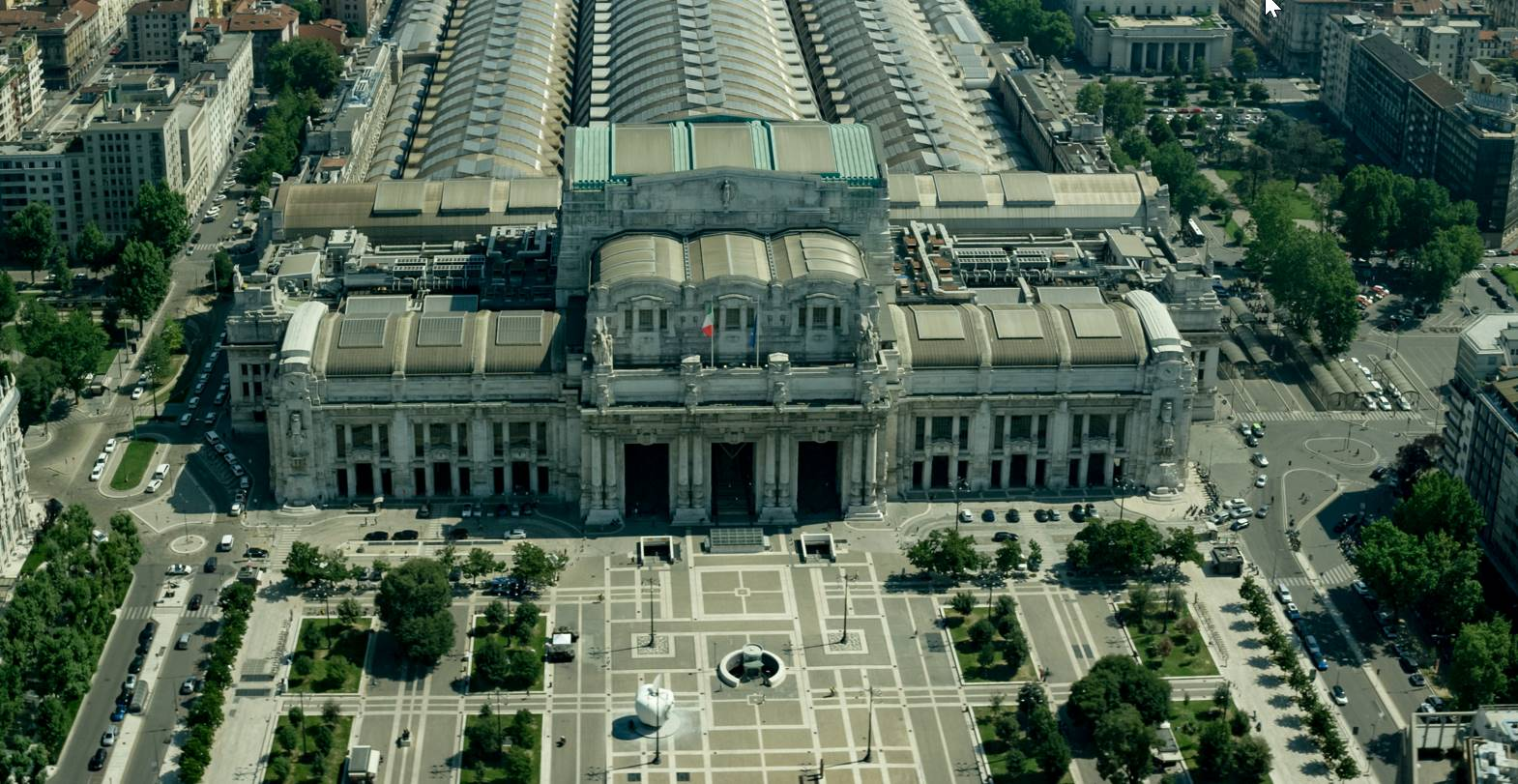
A view of Milano Centrale railway station with MEHITS’ HVAC units on the roof

Mitsubishi Electric Hydronics & IT Cooling Systems SpA (MEHITS) is the Mitsubishi Electric Group company specialized in hydronic systems for air conditioning and IT Cooling. Based in Italy the company designs and manufactures in 12 production plants in Europe, China, and India, and distributes its products worldwide.

== History ==
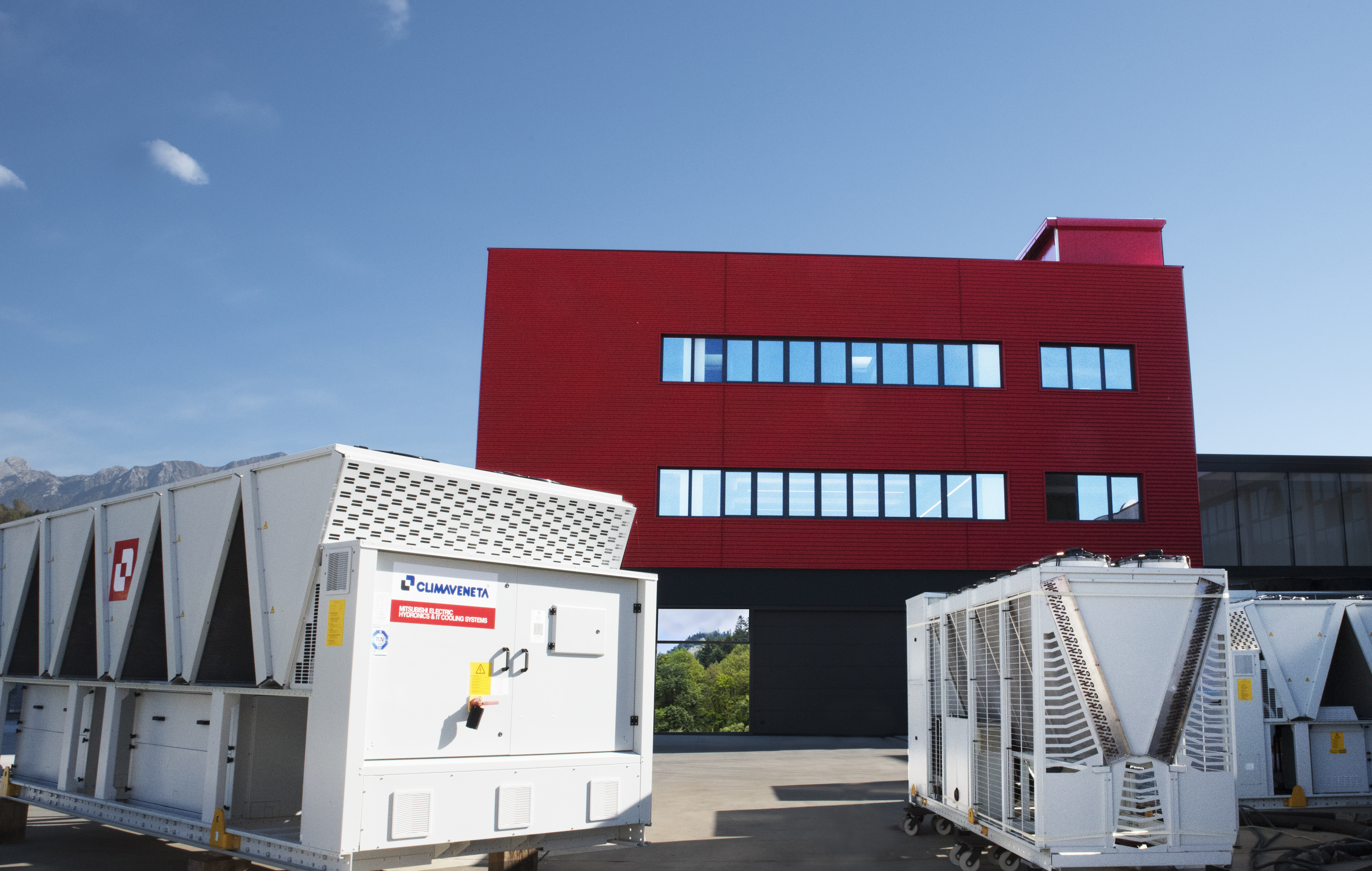
ML21 Testing Center

Mitsubishi Electric Hydronics & IT Cooling Systems SpA was established in 2017, after the acquisition of the previous company DeLclima, which belonged to the De’Longhi Group, by Mitsubishi Electric, in 2015.

MEHITS believes and invests heavily in patenting not only through innovative technologies applied to new products but also its own facilities like the new ML21 Testing Center in Belluno, unique in its kind for the different types of tests that can be carried out inside.
