= Mitsubishi Electric =

Japanese electrical equipment, elevator manufacturer, and appliance manufacturer

Mitsubishi Electric Corporation

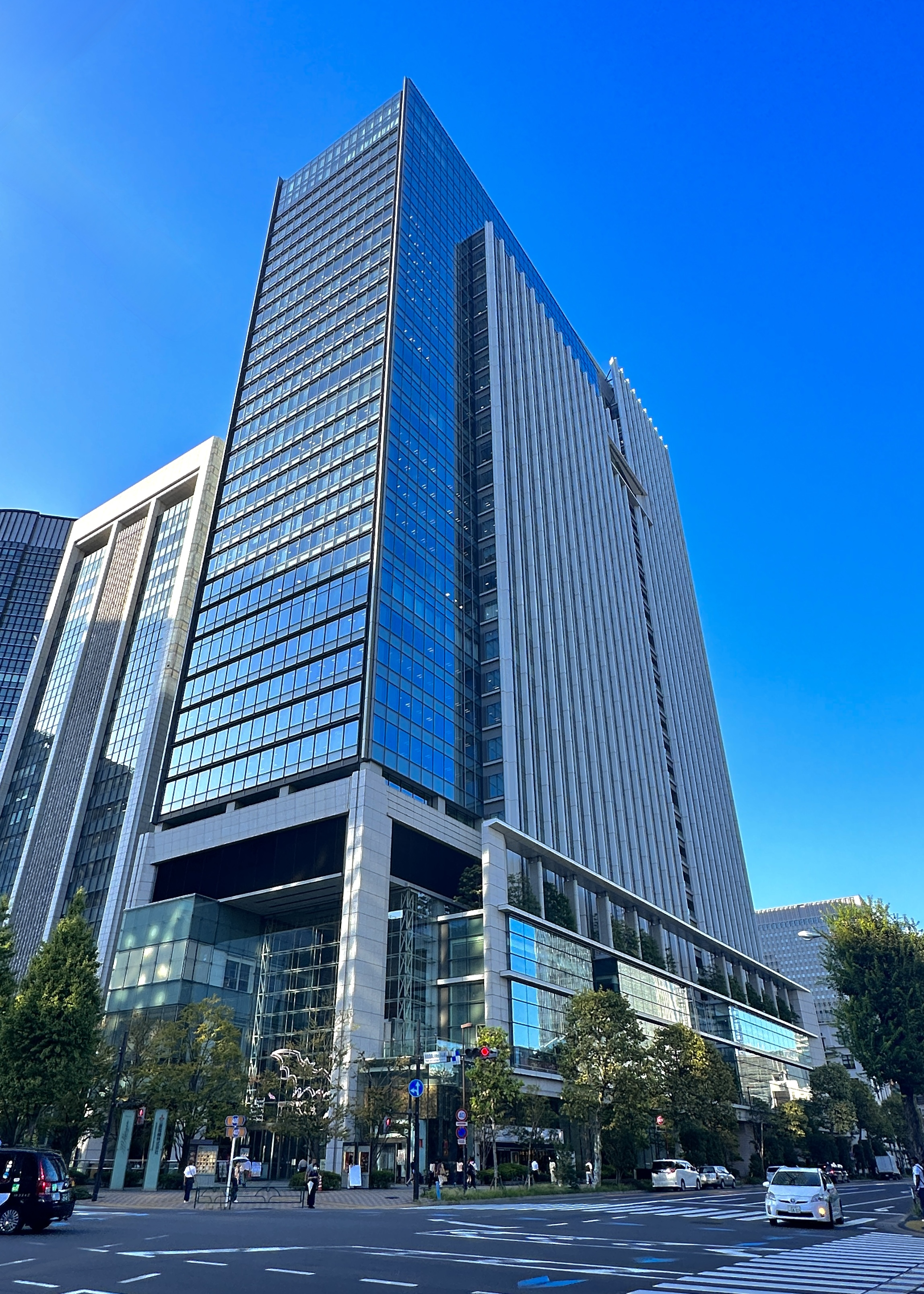
- Headquarters at the Tokyo Building in Marunouchi, Chiyoda, Tokyo
- Native name: 三菱電機株式会社
- Romanized name: Mitsubishi Denki kabushikigaisha
- Formerly: Mitsubishi Electric Manufacturing Co., Ltd.
- Type: Public
- Traded as: TYO: 6503; LSE: MEL
- Industry: Electrical equipment Electronics; Home appliances Semiconductors
- Founded: January 15, 1921; 105 years ago Tokyo, Japan
- Headquarters: Tokyo Building, 2-7-3, Marunouchi, Chiyoda, Tokyo, Japan
- Area served: Worldwide
- Key people: Mitoji Yabunaka (chairman); Kei Uruma (president & CEO)
- Products: Energy and electric systems, electronic devices, industrial automation systems, home appliances, information and communication systems and space systems
- Revenue: ▲¥4.476 trillion (2022)
- Operating income: ▲¥252 billion (2022)
- Net income: ▲¥203 billion (2022)
- Total assets: ▲¥5.107 trillion (2022)
- Total equity: ▲¥2.975 trillion (2022)
- Number of employees: 149,134 (2024)
- Subsidiaries: List: Mitsubishi Electric Information Systems; Mitsubishi Electric Information Network; Mitsubishi Electric IT Solutions; Mitsubishi Electric Building Solutions; Mitsubishi Electric Engineering; Mitsubishi Electric Software; Mitsubishi Electric System & Serviece; Mitsubishi Electric Plant Engineering; Mitsubishi Electric Mechatronics Engineering; Melco Semiconductor Engineering; Mitsubishi Electric Lighting; Mitsubishi Precision; Mitsubishi Electric TOKKI Systems; SPC Electronics; Mitsubishi Electric Control Panel; Mitsubishi Electric Public Utility Equipment; DB Seiko; Melco Power Device; Melco Mobility Solutions; Mitsubishi Electric Air Conditioning & Refrigeration Equipment Sales; Mitsubishi Electric Life Service; Mitsubishi Electric Mechatronics Technologies; Mitsubishi Electric US Holdings; Mitsubishi Electric Europe; Mitsubishi Electric Hydronics & IT Cooling Systems; Mitsubishi Electric India; Mitsubishi Electric Asia; Mitsubishi Electric Thai Auto-Parts; Toshiba Mitsubishi-Electric Industrial Systems (50%)
- Website: www.mitsubishielectric.com

Mitsubishi Electric Corporation (三菱電機株式会社, Mitsubishi Denki kabushikigaisha; formerly branded as メルコ, MELCO) is a Japanese multinational electronics (appliances & consumer electronics) and electrical equipment manufacturing company headquartered in Tokyo, Japan. The company was established in 1921 as a spin-off from the electrical machinery manufacturing division of Mitsubishi Shipbuilding (Mitsubishi Heavy Industries) at the Kobe Shipyard.

A member of the Mitsubishi Group, Mitsubishi Electric produces elevators and escalators, high-end home appliances, air conditioning, factory automation systems, train systems, electric motors, pumps, semiconductors, digital signage, and satellites.

== History ==
Mitsubishi Electric was established as a spin-off from the Mitsubishi Group's other core company Mitsubishi Heavy Industries, then Mitsubishi Shipbuilding, as the latter divested a marine electric motor factory in Kobe, Nagasaki. It has since diversified to become the major electronics company.

Mitsubishi Electric held the record for the fastest elevator in the world, in the 70-story Yokohama Landmark Tower, from 1993 to 2005.

The company acquired Nihon Kentetsu, a Japanese home appliance manufacturer, in 2005.

In 2015 the company acquired DeLclima, an Italian company that designs and produces HVAC and HPAC units, renamed Mitsubishi Electric Hydronics & IT Cooling Systems SpA in 2017.

In early 2020, Mitsubishi Electric was identified as a victim of the year-long cyberattacks perpetrated by the Chinese hackers.

In 2023, Mitsubishi Electric announced its plans to spend 100 billion yen to build a new semiconductor factory in Kumamoto Prefecture, with a target date of April 2026 to begin production.

On August 20, 2026, Mitsubishi Electric agreed to acquire PCI Energy Solutions, an Oklahoma-based provider of energy management software, for a base price of US$1.4 billion. Completion was expected during 2026, subject to regulatory approval and other closing conditions.

== Products ==
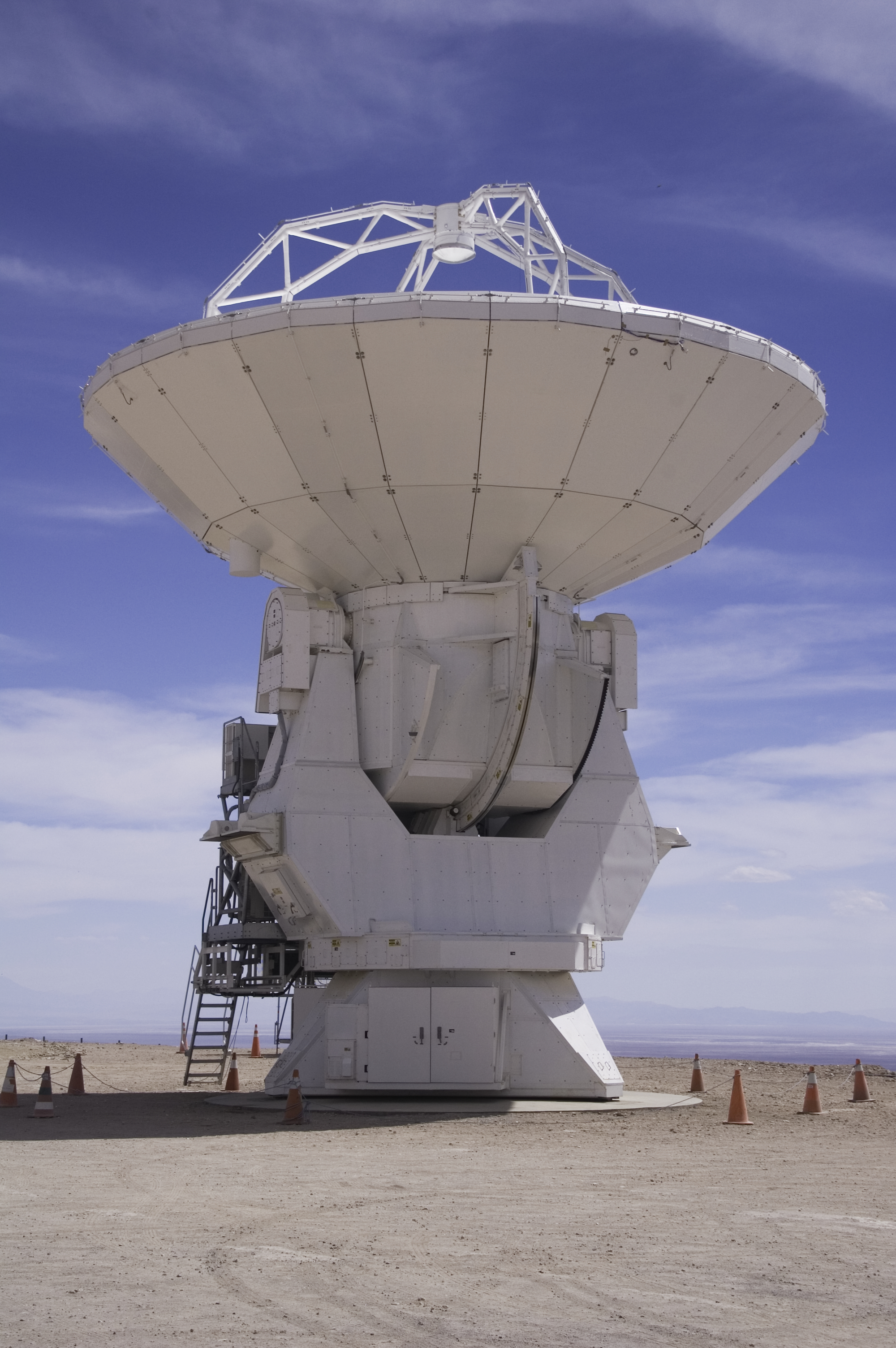
A large dish antenna in the Atacama Large Millimeter Array, manufactured by Mitsubishi Electric

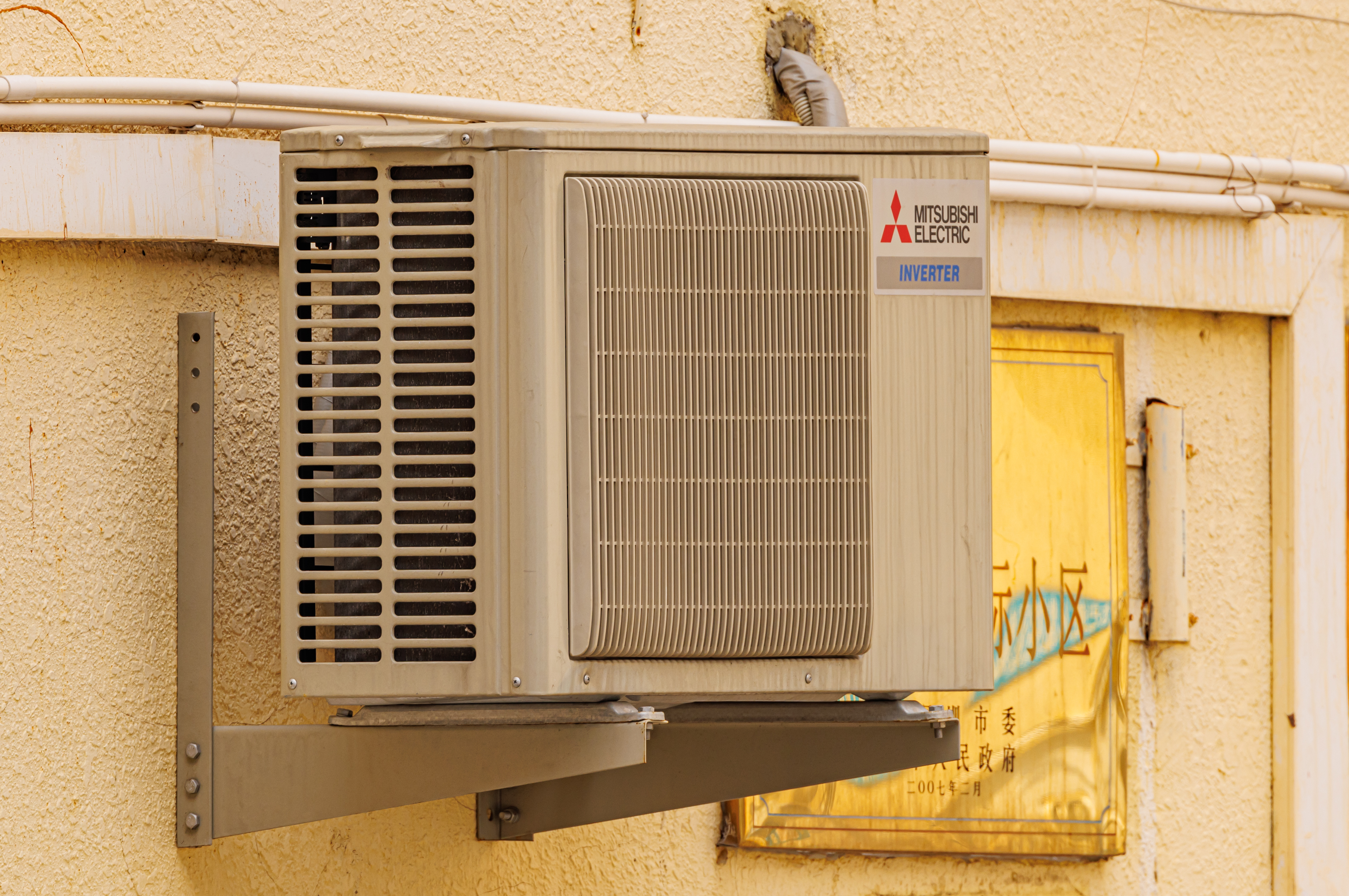
Mitsubishi Electric room air conditioner

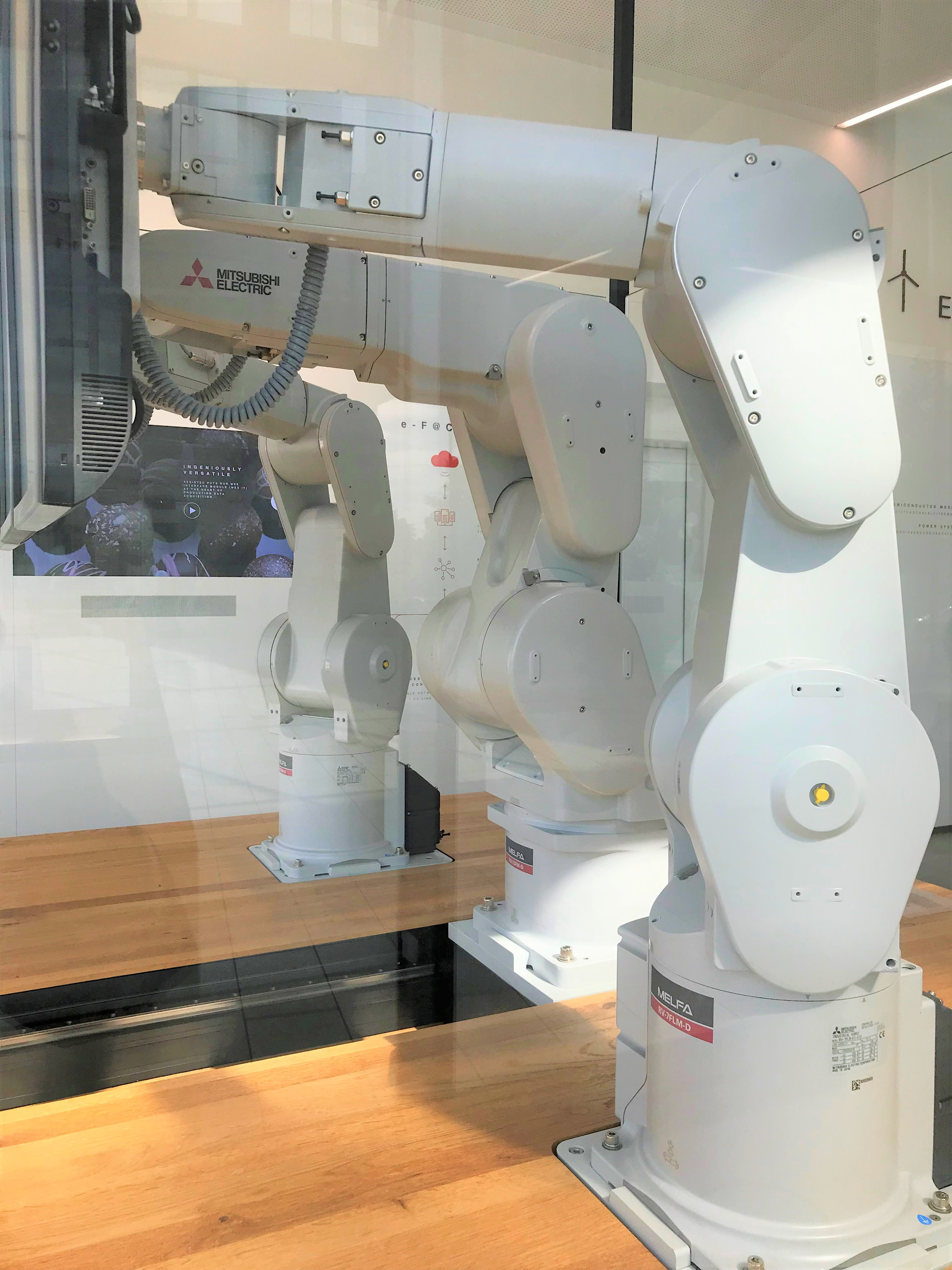
MELFA industrial robots

In 2023, the World Intellectual Property Organization (WIPO)’s Annual PCT Review ranked Mitsubishi Electric's number of patent applications published under the PCT System as 4th in the world, with 2,152 patent applications being published during 2023.

Some product lines of Mitsubishi Electric, such as air conditioners, overlap with the products from Mitsubishi Heavy Industries partly because the companies share the same root.

- Air conditioning systems
  - Room air conditioners (marketed as Mitsubishi Mr. Slim Room Air Conditioner and Mitsubishi Kirigamine)
  - Package air conditioners (Marketed as Mitsubishi Mr. Slim Packaged Air Conditioner)
  - Variable refrigerant flow (VRF) systems (marketed as Mitsubishi CITY MULTI)
  - EcoCute (marketed as Ecodan or DIAHOT)
  - Ventilators
  - Air curtains
  - Air conducting fan
- Home appliances
  - Refrigerators and freezers
  - Air purifiers, dehumidifiers
  - Vacuum cleaners, electric fans
  - Rice cookers, toasters
- Building systems
  - Elevators, escalators
  - Moving walks
  - High-speed hand dryers (marketed as Mitsubishi Jet Towel)
- Information and communications systems
  - Data transmission system solutions
    - SCOPO, the world's first transmission at 10 Gbit/s between relay equipment boards set at a distance of 500 millimetres (20 in) apart
  - Saffron Type System, an anti-aliased text-rendering engine, developed by Mitsubishi Electric Research Laboratories (MERL)
  - Optical access systems
  - Satellite communications
- Factory automation systems
  - Programmable controllers
  - AC servo systems, inverters
  - Industrial and collaborative robots, processing machines
- Energy systems
  - Power generation systems
    - ITER nuclear fusion reactor
    - Photovoltaic panels
  - Transmission and distribution systems
  - Medium & low-voltage switchgear and systems
  - Power information & communication technology
- Semiconductors and devices
  - Power modules, high-power devices
  - Driver ICs
  - Sensors (Contact image sensors, etc.)
  - High-frequency devices
  - optical devices
  - TFT-LCD modules
- Transportation systems
  - Rolling stock systems
  - Power supply and electrification systems
  - Transportation planning and control systems
  - Communication systems
- Automotive equipment
  - Charging and starting products
  - Electrification products (Electric power steering system products, safety and driving assistance system products, etc.)
  - Car multimedia products
- Visual information systems
  - Large-scale LED displays
    - Diamond Vision, large-scale video displays for sports venues and commercial applications
  - Multimedia projectors
  - Printers
- Space systems
  - Satellite programs, platforms, and components
  - Optical and radio telescopes
  - Mobile Mapping System, a high-precision GPS mobile measurement system
- Public systems
  - Applied superconductor systems
  - Doppler lidar, radar systems
    - Active electronically scanned array radar systems for the Mitsubishi F-2 fighter
  - Uninterruptible power supply
  - Water treatment systems, water pumps

== Discontinued products ==
- Mobile phones, from 1999 to 2008. Created for NTT Docomo. Mitsubishi Electric quit the mobile phone business in Apr 2008 after decrease in shipments. They estimated a temporary loss of 17 billion Yen in income before income taxes.
- Video Cassette Recorders known as the Mitsubishi Black Diamond VCR. Started production around 1978 and ended around 2006.
- DVD Players, starting around 1998 and ending around 2006.
- Televisions
  - Large-screen HDTVs. Competitors in the U.S. market were Sony, Pioneer, Panasonic, JVC, Samsung (Akai), Daewoo, LG (Zenith), and Apex Digital.
  - Direct-view CRT televisions and monitors, including Diamond Views and Diamondtrons, from 1953 until 2001. The last notable size in this field was a 40" (diagonal) tube size.
  - LCD TVs, starting in 2004 and ending in 2024.
  - DLP High Definition TVs, until December, 2012. Mitsubishi Electric then focused on professional and home theater DLP projection applications, and is no longer manufacturing televisions for the consumer market.
- Computer memory. Business unit spun off to be part of Elpida Memory.
- Computers, including Mitsubishi Electric mainframe computers, personal computer(Multi8, Multi16) and MSX home computers from 1978 to around 1994.
- System LSIs. Business unit spun off to be part of Renesas Technology.
- Popular music. Mitsubishi Electric previously marketed popular music via record company Nippon Crown, which had been spun off from then-Nissan Group-owned Nippon Columbia on September 15, 1963. it was sold to Daiichi Kosho Company in July, 2001.
- Particle Beam Treatment System, until 2017. Business sold to Hitachi.

== Global operations ==
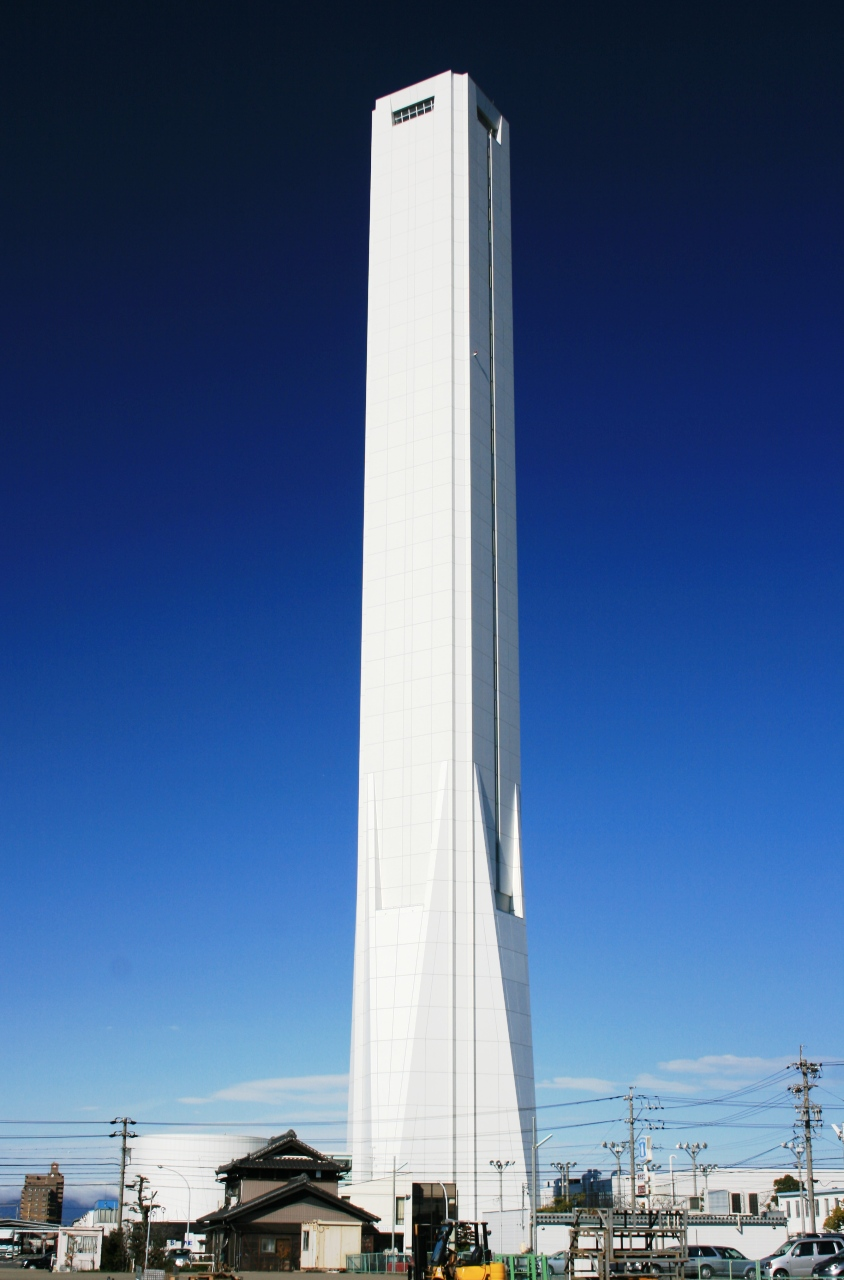
The Mitsubishi Electric-owned Solae Test Tower in Inazawa City, Japan, is the world's tenth tallest elevator testing tower.

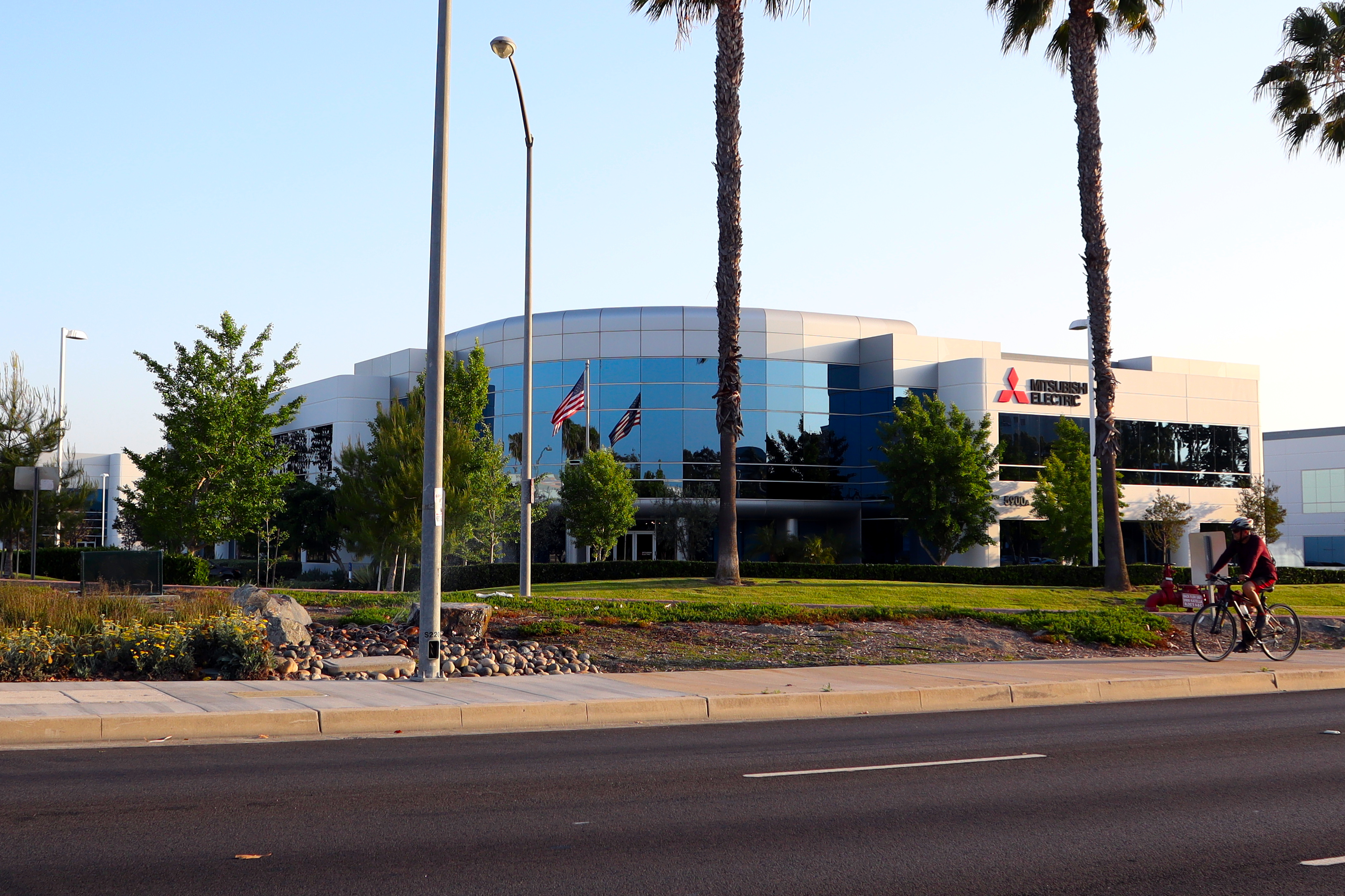
Mitsubishi Electric's United States headquarters in Cypress, California

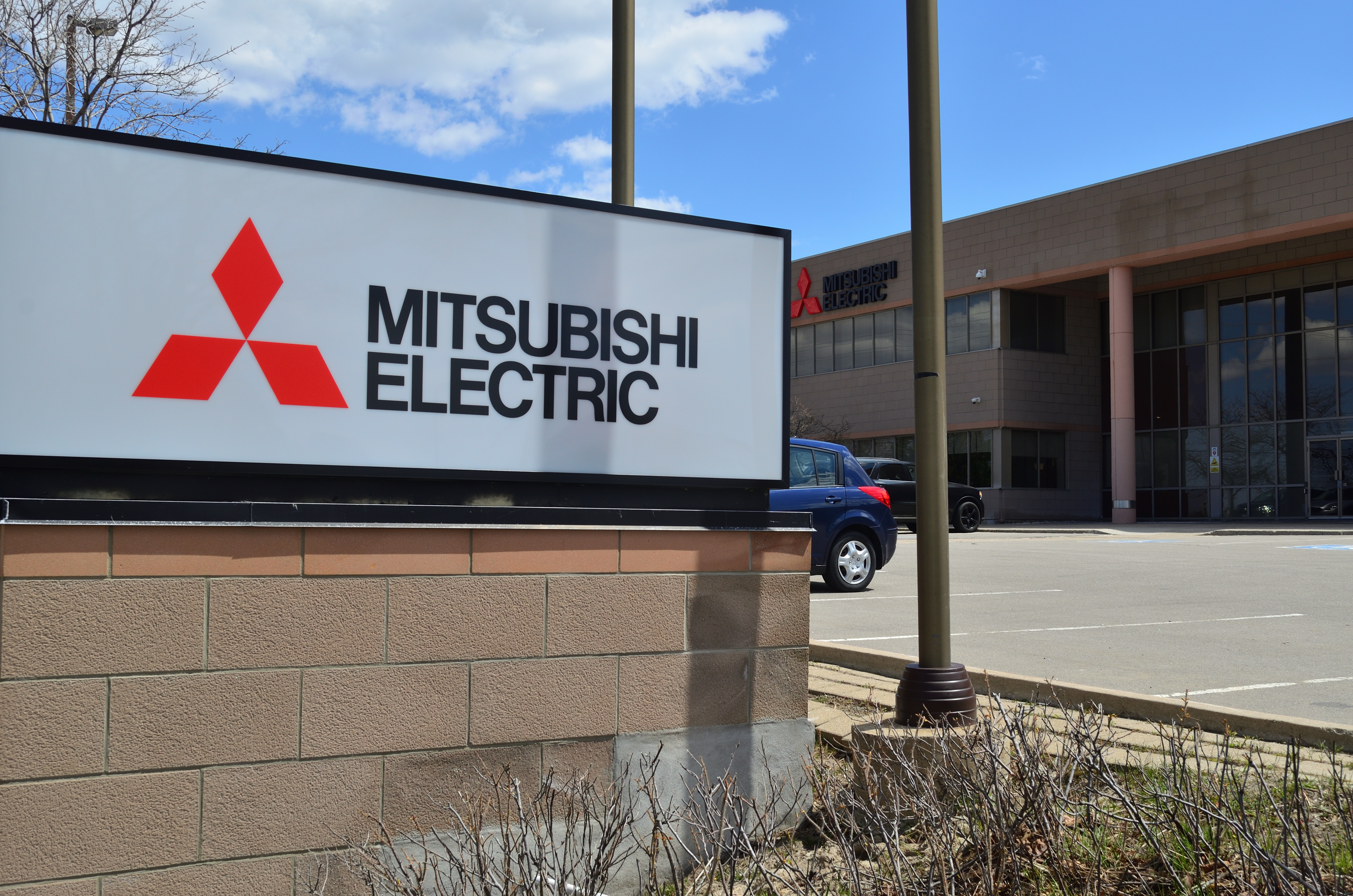
Mitsubishi Electric office in Canada

As of 2013, Mitsubishi Electric's business network around the world were the following:

- Mitsubishi Electric Global
  - Mitsubishi Electric - North America
    - Canada
    - United States - Mitsubishi Electric United States
  - Mitsubishi Electric Asia-Pacific
    - Australia / New Zealand
    - China
    - Hong Kong
    - India
    - Taiwan
    - Vietnam
    - Japan
      There are 11 facilities and 2 laboratories, for example, Kobe, Amagasaki and Kamakura.
    - Malaysia
    - Singapore
    - Thailand
    - Philippines
    - Saudi Arabia - Mitsubishi Electric Saudi Ltd. (MELSA)
  - Mitsubishi Electric Europe
    - Benelux
    - France
    - Germany
    - Ireland
    - Italy
    - Portugal
    - Russia
    - Spain
    - Sweden / Denmark
    - Finland / Norway
    - United Kingdom
    - Turkey

== Slogans ==
Mitsubishi Electric wordmark used exclusively in Japan between 1985 and 2014

- With you today and tomorrow (今日もあなたと共に; 1962–1968, in Japan only)
- Advanced and ever advancing Mitsubishi Electric (未来を開発する三菱電機; 1968–1985 in Japan, 1968–2001 outside Japan)
- SOCIO-TECH: enhancing lifestyles through technology (技術がつくる高度なふれあい SOCIO-TECH; 1985–2001 in Japan. The "Blue MITSUBISHI" logo was introduced for use in Japan.)
- Changes for the Better (since 2001)

== Sports ==
Until September 2016, the company had a corporate team which is now known as the Nagoya Diamond Dolphins. Mitsubishi continues to sponsor the team.

Mitsubishi Electric signed a title sponsorship deal with the AFF Championship (renaming the competition as the AFF Mitsubishi Electric Cup) from the 2022 edition onwards.

== See also ==
- List of elevator manufacturers
- J/FPS-5
