= Eurovent =

European HVAC installer and manufacturer trade association

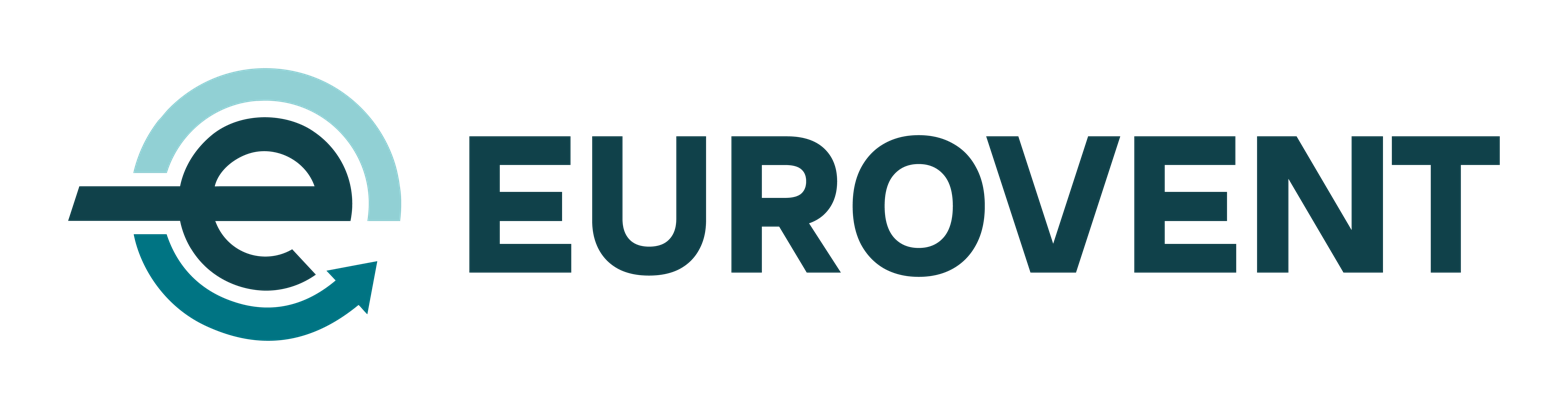
- Abbreviation: Eurovent
- Formation: 1956
- Type: Trade association
- Legal status: Non-profit company
- Headquarters: Head Office Brussels
- Location: Rue de la Loi 62, 1040 Brussels, Belgium
- Region served: Europe
- Members: 18 national Member Associations, 105 Corresponding Members, 14 Associate Members
- Official language: English
- President: Mikael Borjesson
- Main organ: Eurovent General Assembly
- Staff: 10
- Website: https://www.eurovent.eu
- Remarks: Secretary General: Francesco Scuderi

Eurovent is a European organization representing the heating, ventilation, air conditioning and refrigeration industry. The majority of the members are small and medium-sized manufacturers.

== History ==
Eurovent is one of the oldest industry associations of its kind. The association is the result of the merger of the associations CECMA, the European Committee of Constructors of Air Handling Equipment, and CECOMAF, the European Committee of Refrigeration Equipment Manufacturers, in June 1996.

The association represents an industry that started to develop in the 1950s, at a time when the market for heating and refrigeration systems started to grow rapidly. Simultaneously, the European Economic Community was founded and marked the start of a unified regulatory system for goods and services.

European manufacturers of air handling technologies felt the need for in-depth cross-national coordination and information exchange, leading to the foundation of CECMA (later Eurovent) in 1956. Its founding members were national industry associations from Belgium, France, Germany, Italy and the Netherlands.

Simultaneously, associations from the same countries representing the refrigeration equipment industry formed the European Committee of Refrigeration Equipment Manufacturers (CECOMAF), which closely cooperated with CECMA from the beginning.

These associations were set up with two main objectives. First, to jointly develop working terminology in order to enhance communication. Second, to develop ‘codes of good practice’ or ‘Recommendations’ in Technical Committees and to implement those as national standards. The latter process formed the basis of the European industry's self-regulatory system, which, to date, is still a commonly used procedure in situations where no national or European standard is available.

In the course of the constant enlargement of the European Union, CECMA and CECOMAF expanded accordingly, with national associations joining from both EU and non-EU member states, such as Denmark, the United Kingdom, Switzerland and Sweden. Around the same time, in 1964, CECMA changed its name to Eurovent.

The first oil crisis and the search for solutions in the early 1970s further enhanced relations within the industry. Eurovent and CECOMAF started to jointly organise fairs as of 1976, meeting two viable needs: The creation of a single representative exhibition organised for and by the entire HVACR industry, and the generation of revenues, aimed to cover the associations’ increased activities.

By the early 1980s, twelve Eurovent ‘Working Groups’ (today called ‘Product Groups’) actively worked on standardisation development following the increased production and marketing of specialised products. CECOMAF and Eurovent developed joint recommendations and technical documents, which increasingly obtained recognition and were sold in high numbers (about 300 copies annually) across Europe and beyond.

In 1991, Eurovent, together with its partner associations from Canada, Japan and the United States, founded the International Council of Air-conditioning and Refrigeration Manufacturers Association (ICARMA), a cross-national organisation bringing together representatives from HVACR associations worldwide. Today, ICARHMA (with the heating sector being added over time) members meet once a year, now also including associations from other regions of the world.

In June 1996, further cooperation between CECOMAF and Eurovent finally led to the merger of the two associations into the European Committee of Air Handling and Refrigeration Equipment Manufacturers, known as Eurovent/CECOMAF.

=== 2000 to present ===
With the beginning of the new millennium, European legislation proliferated and Eurovent redefined its priorities to deal with a selection of them. In general, the Working Groups covered one or more of the laws applying to their products.

In 2007, it was decided to change the name of the association from CECOMAF/Eurovent to simply Eurovent. By now, the European politicians and legislators noted that, in order to ensure a properly functioning Single Market and the reaching of common goals, it was necessary to introduce directly applicable laws (so-called EU Regulations). Eurovent became more actively involved in the decision-making procedures, representing the major part of the HVACR industry.

This was also the period during which legislators realised that product legislation needed to be accompanied by mandatory standards, in order to ease the manner in which presumption of conformity could be shown by manufacturers.

By 2010, Eurovent revised its working methods and redeveloped its corporate structure. Until 2014, the industry had largely used the HVACR terminology throughout its activities. Yet, manufacturers had realised over time that this marks a largely technically driven terminology that insufficiently reflects upon convergence and key applications. Thus, in a wider approach to make the industry more attractive for younger generations while incorporating industrial realities, Eurovent members had requested a terminology that reflects the actual structure, development and ideals of the industry. This has led to the development of Eurovent during the organisation's Annual Meeting in Stockholm in May 2015.

In 2015, the association's geographical scope was extended following an increasing number of requests from manufacturers in the Middle East and Northern Africa to support them in the development of high-quality standards and legislation. This went hand in hand with European manufacturers arguing that the terminology EMEA would already be commonly applied and that, in trade terms, Europe, the Middle East and Africa would increasingly grow together. In early 2018, Eurovent Middle East was set up as the association’s local chapter in the region.

== Structure ==
The organisation's activities are based on democratic decision-making principles, ensuring a level playing field for the industry independent from organisation sizes or membership fees.

Eurovent has 18 national Member Associations in its network.

Membership
Country	Member Association	Website
Belgium	AGORIA	https://www.agoria.be/en
Denmark	VELTEK Ventilation	https://www.veltek.dk/ventilation/
Finland	Talteka	https://talteka.fi/
France	Uniclima	https://uniclima.fr/
Germany	VDMA / FV ALT	https://www.vdma.org/
Germany	VDMA / FV-VtMA	https://www.vdma.org/
Italy	Assoclima	https://www.assoclima.it/
Italy	Assocold	http://www.assocold.it/
Netherlands	Binnenklimaat Nederland	https://www.binnenklimaatnederland.nl/
Netherlands	NVKL	https://www.nvkl.nl/
Norway	VKE	https://www.vke.no/
Portugal	EFRIARC	http://efriarc.pt/
Spain	AEFYT	https://www.aefyt.es/
Spain	AFEC	https://www.afec.es/
Sweden	Svensk Ventilation	https://www.svenskventilation.se/
Switzerland	ProKlima	https://www.proklima.ch
Turkiye	ISKID	http://iskid.org.tr/en/home-page
United Kingdom	FETA	http://feta.co.uk

=== Decision-making bodies ===
Key decisions are taken within one of Eurovent's three main bodies: Board, Commission, and General Assembly. The General Secretariat, with its headquarters in Brussels and regional offices in Milan and Prague, is the executive body responsible for day-to-day association management.

The General Secretariat is headed by the Secretary General. This person is presented by the Board and appointed by the General Assembly. The Secretary General carries out specific tasks under the direction and supervision of the President. Eurovent's current Secretary General is Francesco Scuderi.

Eurovent is registered under the European Union 'Transparency Register' - ID number: 89424237848-89 Transparency Register.

== Services ==
One of Eurovent's key activities is representing the industry's achievements while bringing knowledge across to emerging markets around the globe in cooperation with local partners. Examples of these activities are:

- Joint participation to European sector exhibitions
- Industry delegations to potential markets within Europe and beyond
- European representation within global association ICARHMA

Eurovent is a founding member of ICARHMA, the International Council of Air-Conditioning, Refrigeration, and Heating Manufacturers Associations, and represents European-oriented industry ideals in the latter. Once per year, representatives of ICARHMA's member associations from Australia, China, Japan, India, Korea, Latin and North America meet in a different host country to discuss ongoing policies and various other global issues related to the ‘HVACR’ industry including energy efficiency and environmental stewardship.

== Events and exhibitions ==
Eurovent has engaged cooperation with several European and extra-European sector exhibitions to provide benefits for its members. In addition, several industry delegations are organised every year to several of these exhibitions.

On a regular basis, Eurovent organises industry delegations in the course of sector exhibitions in emerging markets. These delegations bring together European decision-makers with their global counterparts. They are organised in cooperation with local partners, and usually accompanied by a dedicated side programme, including regional market seminars and meetings with authorities of the visited region. Example destinations include Dubai, Jakarta, Shanghai, and Moscow. The latter exhibition is also official partner of Eurovent.

=== Eurovent Summit ===
The EUROVENTSUMMIT is a biennial event gathering key decision-makers in the area of Indoor Climate (HVAC), Process Cooling, and Food Cold Chain Technologies. Organised by the Eurovent Association, Eurovent Certita Certification, and Eurovent Market Intelligence, it connects over 500 manufacturers, industry associations, engineering societies, laboratories and political decision-makers from Europe, the Middle East, and Northern Africa throughout 40 meetings, seminars, and events.

== Subunits ==
Eurovent has two subunits: Eurovent Certification and Eurovent Market Intelligence. Both units are headquartered in Paris and operate independently from the association.

=== Eurovent Certification ===
Eurovent Certification is a provider of third-party performance certification programmes for the HVACR industry. The company is currently running over 40 certification programmes from its basis in Paris - both on national and global level. The most well-known programme is the ‘Eurovent Certified Performance’ quality mark, which certifies the energy performance level of both domestic and industrial facilities.

=== Eurovent Market Intelligence ===
Eurovent Market Intelligence (EMI) is the European Statistics Office for the HVACR market. Founded in 1994, EMI aims to establish a detailed map of the European, Middle-East and African market thanks to the manufacturers' participation in the data collections. Next to providing market data to HVACR manufacturers, EMI assists European legislative institutions such as the European Commission in shaping legislation according to key market data.
