= Middle Fork Township =

Middle Fork Township may refer to the following townships in the United States:

== Illinois ==
- Middlefork Township, Vermilion County, Illinois

== Iowa ==
- Middle Fork Township, Ringgold County, Iowa

== Missouri ==
- Middle Fork Township, Macon County, Missouri
- Middlefork Township, Worth County, Missouri

== North Carolina ==
- Middle Fork Township, Forsyth County, North Carolina
- Middle Fork I Township, Forsyth County, North Carolina
- Middle Fork II Township, Forsyth County, North Carolina

== See also ==
- Middle Fork (disambaguation)
- Middlefork (disambaguation)
