= Belews Creek =

Belews Creek may refer to:

== Communities ==
- Belews Creek, Missouri, an unincorporated community
- Belews Creek Township, Forsyth County, North Carolina
  - Belews Creek, North Carolina, an unincorporated community in the above township

== Other ==
- Belews Creek (Missouri), a stream
- Belews Creek Power Station, a generating facility located on Belews Lake in Stokes County, North Carolina
