= Vienna Township, Forsyth County, North Carolina =

Township in Forsyth County, North Carolina, U.S.

Coordinates: 36.1480134°N 80.3992652°W

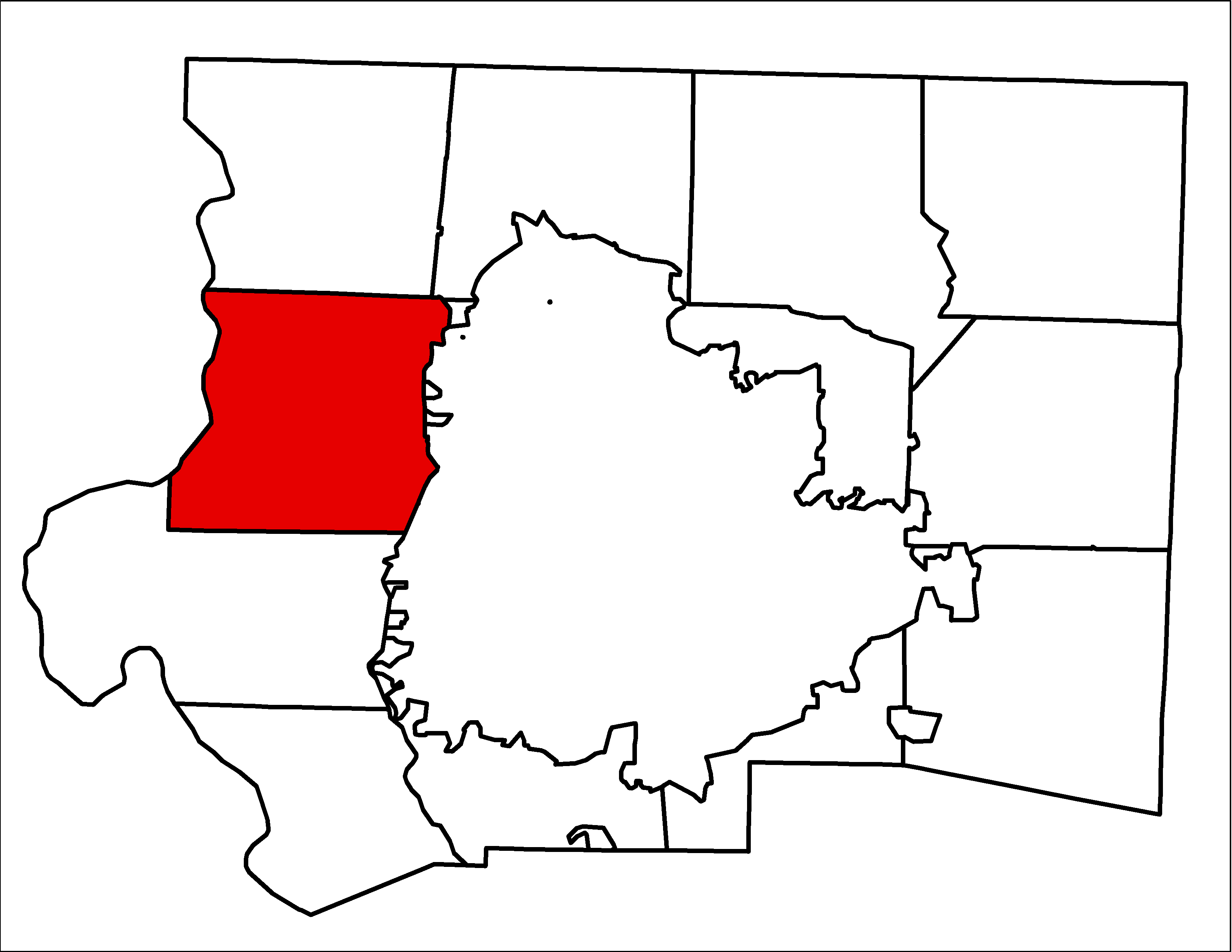
Location of Vienna Township in Forsyth County, N.C.

Vienna Township is one of fifteen townships in Forsyth County, North Carolina, United States. The township had a population of 10,243 according to the 2010 census.

Geographically, Vienna Township occupies 26.19 square miles (67.8 km^{2}) in southwestern Forsyth County. Vienna Township contains parts of the town of Lewisville as well as the unincorporated communities of Pfafftown and Vienna. The township fronts the Yadkin River on its western boundary.
