= Jester Hairston =

American composer, songwriter, arranger, choral conductor, and actor (1901–2000)

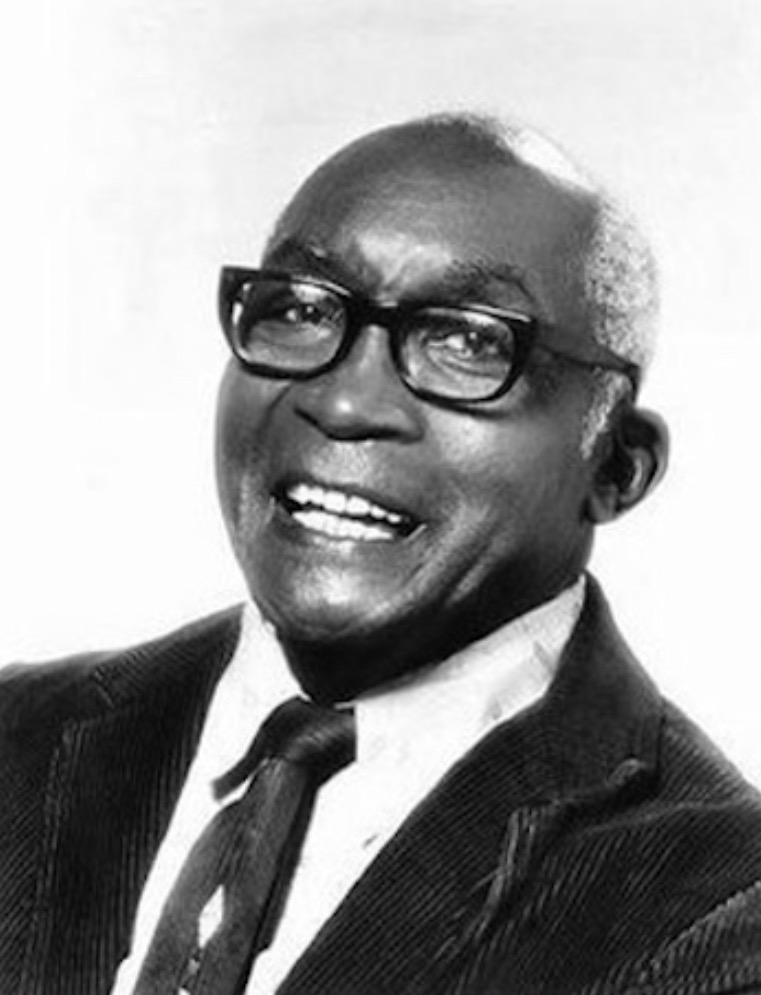
- Hairston in That's My Mama, 1974
- Born: Jester Joseph Hairston; July 9, 1901; Belews Creek, North Carolina, U.S.
- Died: January 18, 2000 (aged 98); Los Angeles, California, U.S.
- Resting place: Inglewood Park Cemetery
- Other names: Jasper J. Hairston; Jester J. Hairston
- Occupations: Composer; songwriter; arranger; choral conductor; actor
- Years active: 1936–1999
- Spouse: Isabelle Margaret Swanigan (m. 1939; died 1986)

Jester Joseph Hairston (July 9, 1901 – January 18, 2000) was an American composer, songwriter, arranger, choral conductor and actor. He was regarded as a leading expert on black spirituals and choral music. His notable compositions include "Amen", a gospel-tinged theme from the film Lilies of the Field and a 1964 hit for the Impressions, and the Christmas song "Mary's Boy Child".

== Early life ==
Hairston was born in Belews Creek, a rural community on the border of Stokes, Forsyth, Rockingham and Guilford counties in North Carolina. His grandparents had been slaves. At an early age, he and his family moved to Homestead, Pennsylvania, just outside Pittsburgh, where he graduated from high school in 1921. Hairston was very young when his father was killed in a job-related accident. Hairston was raised by his grandmother while his mother worked. Hairston heard his grandmother and her friends talking and singing about plantation life and became determined to preserve this history through music.

Hairston initially majored in landscape architecture at Massachusetts Agricultural College in the 1920s. He became involved in various church choirs and choral groups, and accompanist Anna Laura Kidder saw his potential and became his benefactor. Kidder offered Hairston financial assistance to study music at Tufts University, from which he graduated in 1929. He was one of the first black students admitted to Tufts. (Note: Hairston had to postpone his college work many times due to financial problems. Each time he would temporarily withdraw and work full time to earn his tuition money for the next year of education. When he first applied to Tufts, he was rejected. After meeting an African-American man who had formerly studied at Tufts, he was advised how to write a letter to gain acceptance. Hairston was able to obtain a full scholarship for his time at Tufts after his first semester as a student there.) Later he studied music at the Juilliard School.

Hairston pledged the Chi chapter of the Kappa Alpha Psi fraternity in 1925. He worked as a choir conductor in the early stages of his career. His work with choirs on Broadway eventually led to singing and acting parts in plays, films, radio programs and television shows.

== Career ==
Hairston sang with the Hall Johnson Choir in Harlem for a time but was nearly fired from the all-black choir because he had difficulty with the rural dialects that were used in some of the songs. He had to shed his Boston accent and relearn the country speech of his parents and grandparents. Johnson had told him: "We're singing ain't and cain't and you're singing shahn't and cahn't and they don't mix in a spiritual." The choir performed in many Broadway shows, including The Green Pastures. In 1936, the choir was asked to visit Hollywood to sing for the film The Green Pastures. Russian composer Dimitri Tiomkin heard Hairston and invited him to what would become a 30-year collaboration in which Hairston arranged and collected music for films. In 1939, Hairston married Margaret Swanigan. He wrote and arranged spirituals for Hollywood films as well as for high school and college choirs around the country.

Hairston wrote the song "Mary's Boy Child" in 1956. He also arranged the song "Amen", which he dubbed for the Sidney Poitier film Lilies of the Field, and arranged traditional Negro spirituals. Most of Hairston's film work was in the field of composing, arranging and choral conducting. He also acted in more than 20 films, mostly in small roles, some uncredited. The film roles included some of the early Tarzan films as well as St. Louis Blues, To Kill a Mockingbird, In the Heat of the Night, Lady Sings the Blues, I'm Gonna Git You Sucka and Being John Malkovich. Hairston starred in John Wayne's The Alamo (1960), in which he portrayed "Jethro", a slave owned by Jim Bowie. In 1962’s To Kill a Mockingbird Hairston portrayed the uncredited role of the father of accused rapist Tom Robinson. In 1967’s In the Heat of the Night, Hairston portrayed the butler of a wealthy racist being investigated for murder. In both films, Hairston shot scenes alongside men who won an Academy Award for Best Actor in those respective films for portraying white Southerners navigating their jobs through a racially divided culture.

In 1961, the U.S. State Department appointed Hairston as Goodwill Ambassador. He traveled all over the world teaching and performing the folk music of the slaves. In the 1960s, he held choral festivals with public high school choirs, introducing them to Negro spiritual music, and sometimes led several hundred students in community performances. His banter about the history of the songs along with his engaging personality and sense of humor endeared him to many students.

During his nationwide travels, Hairston checked local phone books for other Hairstons and reunited many people on his family tree, both black and white. He composed more than 300 spirituals. He was the recipient of many honorary doctorates, including a doctorate from the University of Massachusetts in 1972 and a doctorate in music from Tufts in 1977.

Hairston appeared on the television situation comedy The Amos 'n' Andy Show as society sophisticate Henry Van Porter and portrayed the character of Leroy on both the radio and television Amos 'n' Andy programs. He also played the role of Wildcat on the show That's My Mama. In his senior years, he appeared on the show Amen as Rolly Forbes. His last television appearance was in 1993 on an episode of Family Matters. Hairston also played the role of "King Moses" on radio for the Humphrey Bogart and Lauren Bacall show Bold Venture.

In his later years, Hairston served as a cultural ambassador for American music, traveling to numerous countries with choral groups that he had assembled. In 1985, he took the Jester Hairston Chorale, a multiracial group, to sing in China at a time when foreign visitors would rarely appear there.

== Death ==
Hairston died in Los Angeles of natural causes in 2000 at age 98. For his contribution to the television industry, Hairston has a star on the Hollywood Walk of Fame located at 6201 Hollywood Boulevard. He is interred at Inglewood Park Cemetery, Inglewood, California.

== Filmography ==
Film
Year	Title	Role	Notes
1936	The Green Pastures	Member of Hall Johnson Choir	Uncredited
1941	Sundown	Native Boy	Uncredited
1941	Sullivan's Travels	Charlie – Church Projectionist	Uncredited
1942	The Vanishing Virginian	Mover	Uncredited
1942	In This Our Life	Black Man in Jail	Uncredited
1942	Tales of Manhattan	Shantytown Man	(Robeson sequence), Uncredited
1942	Across the Pacific	Passerby	Uncredited
1951	Yes Sir, Mr. Bones	Jester Hairston	
1952	We're Not Married!	Leader of Christmas Carolers	Uncredited
1953	So This Is Love	Preacher	Uncredited
1954	Gypsy Colt	Carl	
1954	Tanganyika	Singer	Uncredited
1955	Tarzan's Hidden Jungle	Witch Doctor	Uncredited
1955	Pete Kelly's Blues	Mourner, Pre-Credit Sequence	Uncredited
1956	Tension at Table Rock	Black Janitor	Uncredited
1956	Full of Life	Train Porter	Uncredited
1957	Band of Angels	Plantation Slave	Uncredited
1958	St. Louis Blues	Choir Member	Uncredited
1960	Raymie	Ransom	
1960	The Alamo	Jethro	
1961	Summer and Smoke	Thomas	Uncredited
1962	To Kill a Mockingbird	Spence Robinson, Tom's father	Uncredited
1967	In the Heat of the Night	Butler	
1968	Finian's Rainbow	Passion Pilgrim Gospeleer	Uncredited
1972	Lady Sings the Blues	The Butler	
1976	The Bingo Long Traveling All-Stars & Motor Kings	Furry Taylor, Has-been player selling souvenirs	
1976	The Last Tycoon	Waiter in Stahr's Office	Uncredited
1988	I'm Gonna Git You Sucka	Pop Adam	
1999	Being John Malkovich	Adam Hairston	Uncredited, (final film role)
Television
Year	Title	Role	Notes
1951–1953	The Amos 'n' Andy Show	Various	10 episodes
1955	You Are There	Thornton	1 episode
1956	Gunsmoke	Wellington	1 episode
1956	The 20th Century Fox Hour	Jacob	1 episode
1959	Rawhide	Zachariah	1 episode
1961	Thriller	Papa Benjamin	1 episode
1962	Have Gun – Will Travel	Old Man	1 episode
1969	The Outcasts	Daniel	1 episode
1969	The Virginian	John Douglas	1 episode
1974–1975	That's My Mama	Wildcat	22 episodes
1975	Harry O	Jefferson Johnson	1 episode
1986–1991	Amen	Rolly Forbes	110 episodes
1993	Family Matters	William	1 episode

== Sources cited ==
- Fearn-Burns, Kathleen, ed. (2005). Historical Dictionary of African-American Television (Historical Dictionaries of Literature and the Arts). The Scarecrow Press. ISBN 0-8108-5335-3.
- Fullen, M. K. (1992). Pathblazers: Eight People who Made a Difference. Open Hand Publishing. ISBN 978-0-9408-8036-8.
- Wiencek, Henry (2000). The Hairstons: An American Family in Black and White. Macmillan. ISBN 978-0-3122-5393-6.
