= Clemmonsville, North Carolina =

Clemmonsville, North Carolina may refer to:

- Clemmons, North Carolina, formerly called Clemmonsville,
- Clemmonsville Township, Forsyth County, North Carolina
