= Abbotts Creek Township, North Carolina =

Abbotts Creek Township may refer to:

- Abbotts Creek Township, Davidson County, North Carolina
- Abbotts Creek Township, Forsyth County, North Carolina

== See also ==
- Abbotts Creek, North Carolina
