= Lewisville Township, Forsyth County, North Carolina =

Township in Forsyth County, North Carolina, U.S.

Coordinates: 36°05′56″N 80°25′27″W

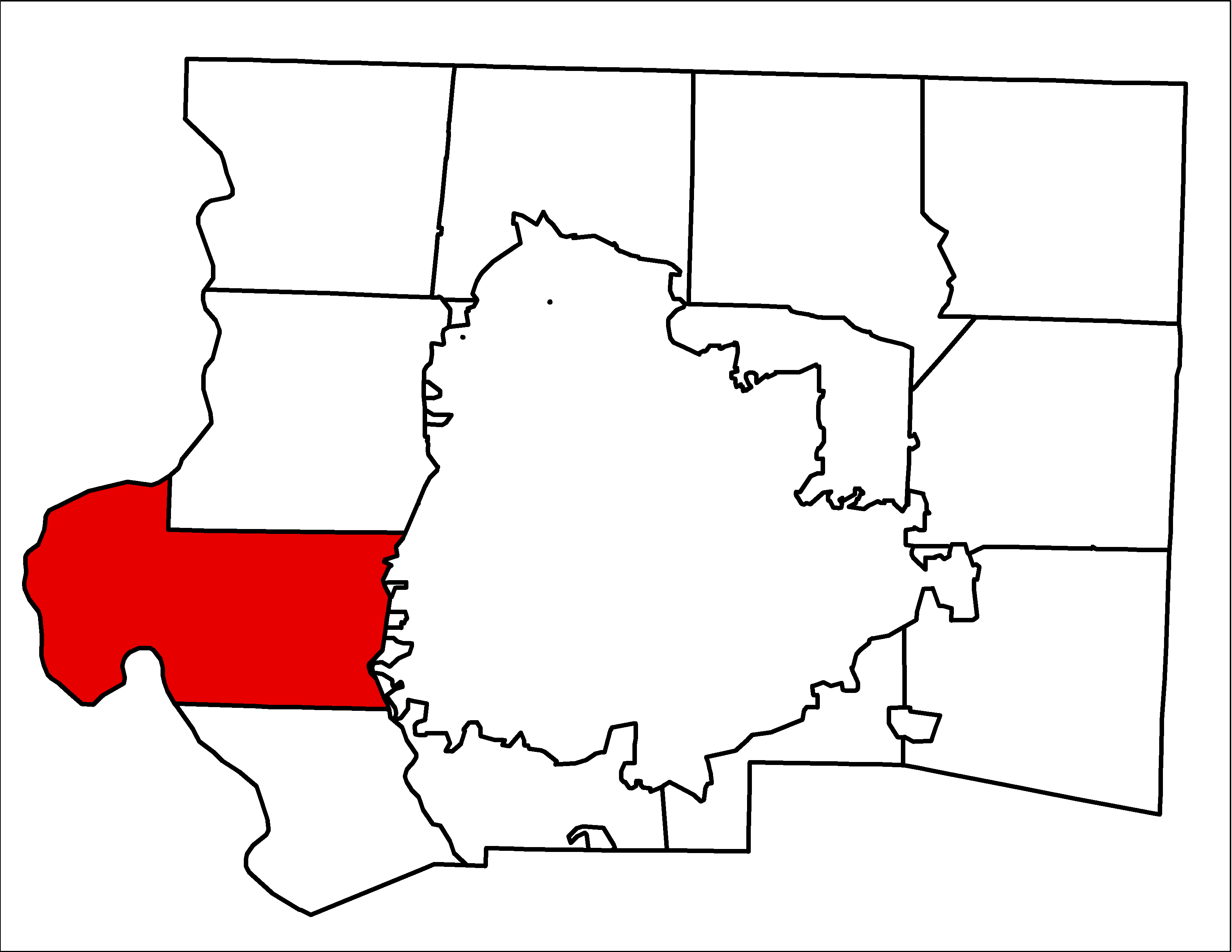
Location of Lewisville Township in Forsyth County, N.C.

Lewisville Township is one of fifteen townships in Forsyth County, North Carolina, United States. The township had a population of 17,707 according to the 2010 census.

Geographically, Lewisville Township occupies 32.36 square miles (83.8 km^{2}) in southwestern Forsyth County. Lewisville Township contains the town of Lewisville and parts of the village of Clemmons. The township fronts the Yadkin River on its western boundary.
