= Kernersville Township, Forsyth County, North Carolina =

Township in Forsyth County, North Carolina, U.S.

Coordinates: 36.1322707°N 80.0758425°W

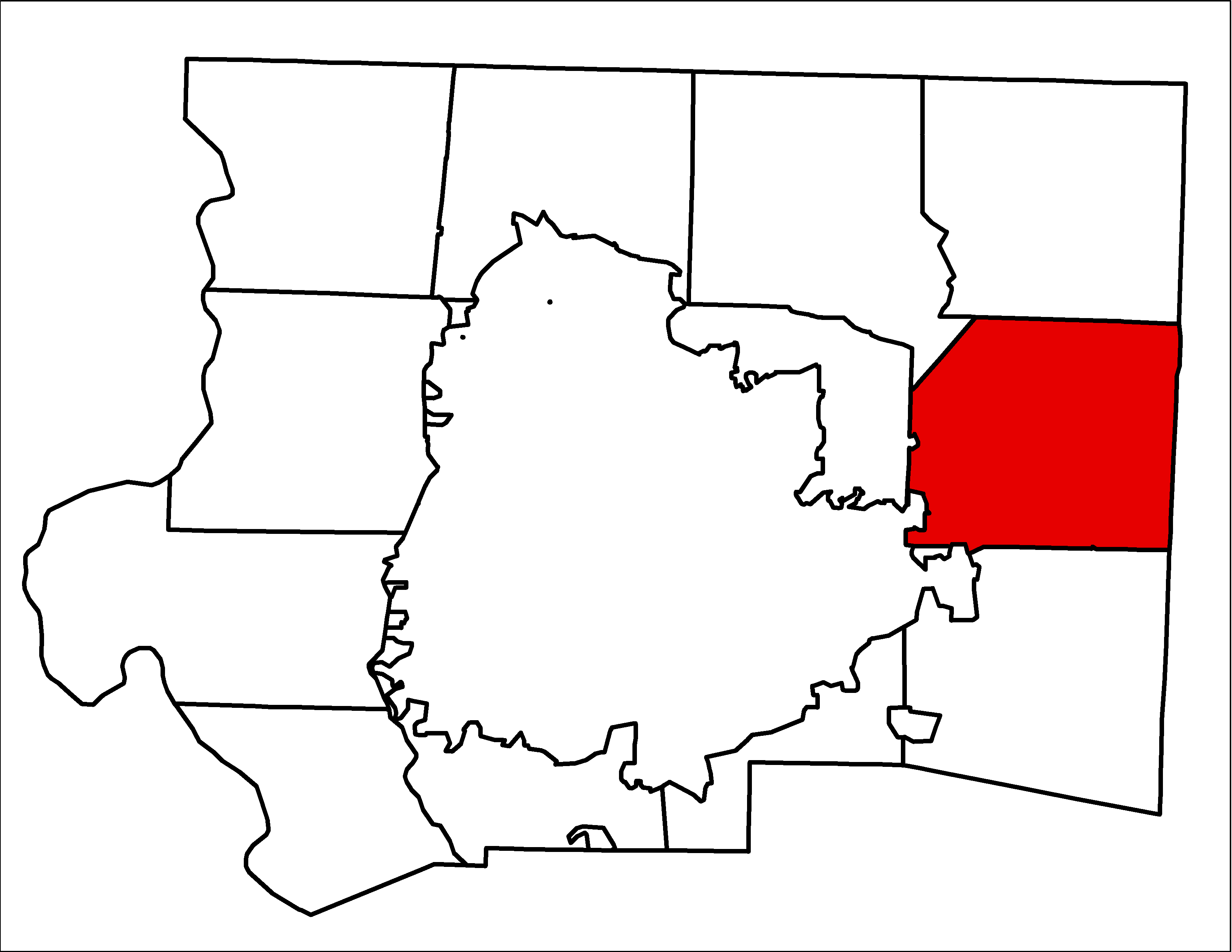
Location of Kernersville Township in Forsyth County, N.C.

Kernersville Township is one of fifteen townships in Forsyth County, North Carolina, United States. The township had a population of 30,386 according to the 2010 census.

== Geography ==
Geographically, Kernersville Township occupies 31.17 square miles (80.7 km^{2}) in eastern Forsyth County. Much of Kernersville Township consists of the town of Kernersville and a small portion of the town of Walkertown.
