= Winston Township, Forsyth County, North Carolina =

Township in Forsyth County, North Carolina, U.S.

Coordinates: 36°06′14″N 80°15′16″W

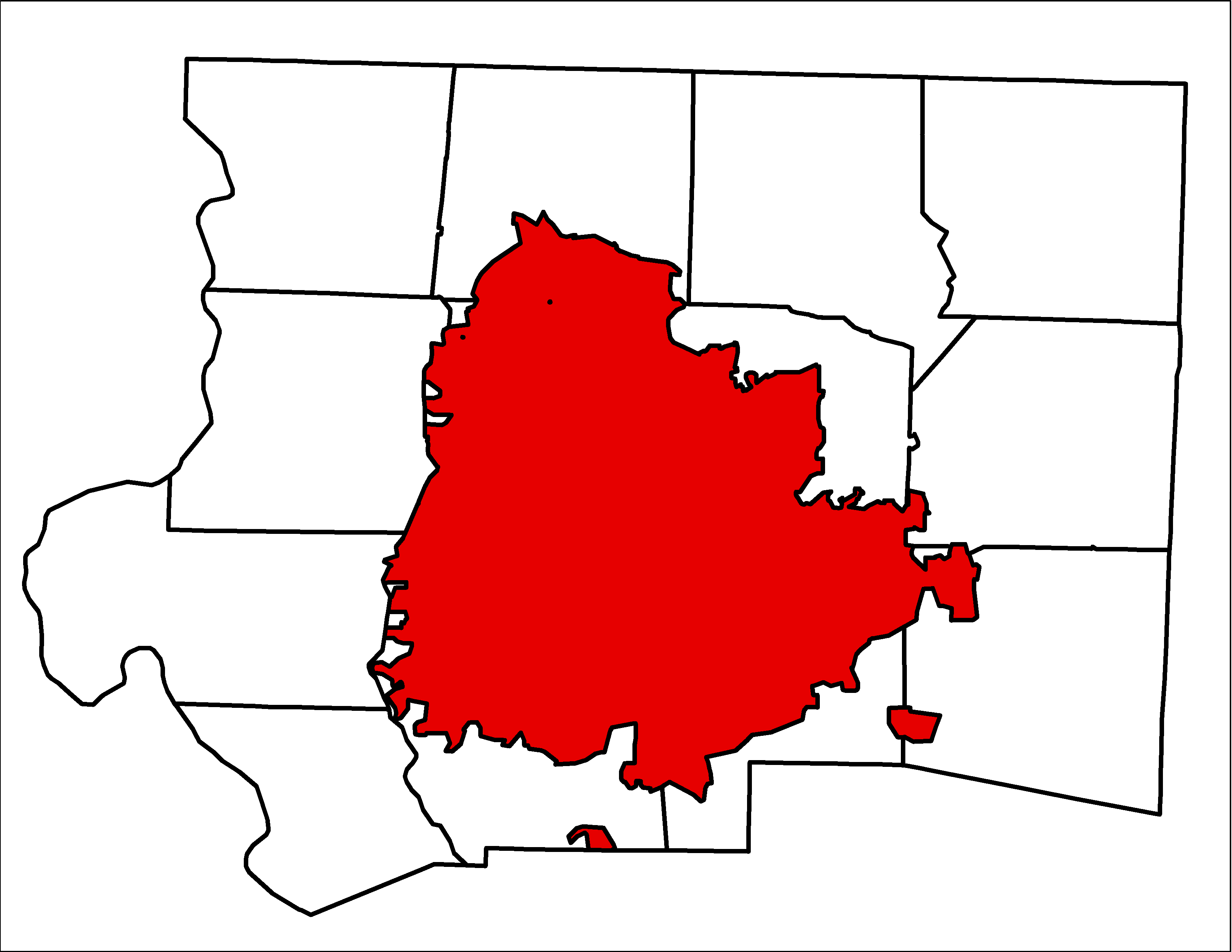
Location of Winston Township in Forsyth County, N.C.

Winston Township is one of fifteen townships in Forsyth County, North Carolina, United States. The township had a population of 229,617, according to the 2010 census.

Geographically, Winston Township occupies 133.69 square miles (346.3 km^{2}) in central Forsyth County. Winston Township is coextensive with the city of Winston-Salem and subsequently, township boundaries expand with every annexation by the city. Consequently, much of the townships of Old Town, Broadbay, South Fork, Middle Fork and smaller portions of others have been consumed by Winston in recent years.
