= Seward, North Carolina =

- Unincorporated community
- Location within North Carolina Location within the United States
- Coordinates: 36°11′21″N 80°22′35″W
- Country: United States
- State: North Carolina
- County: Forsyth
- Time zone: UTC-5 (Eastern (EST))
  - Summer (DST): UTC-4 (EDT)

Seward is an unincorporated community in western Forsyth County, North Carolina, United States (Powell 1968, p. 446).
