= Bethania Township, Forsyth County, North Carolina =

Township in North Carolina, United States

Coordinates: 36.230°N 80.301°W

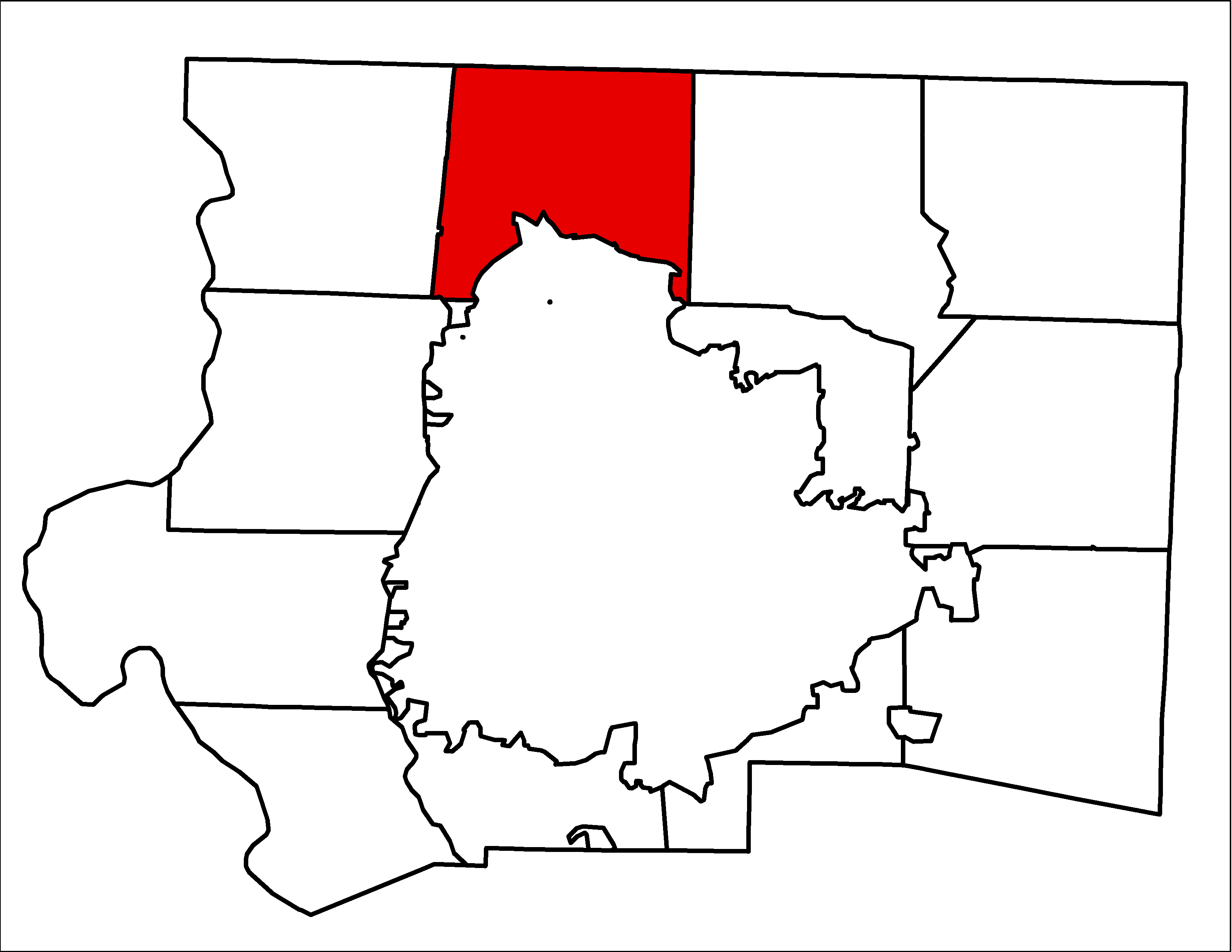
Location of Bethania Township in Forsyth County, N.C.

Bethania Township is one of fifteen townships in Forsyth County, North Carolina, United States. The township had a population of 9,200 according to the 2010 census.

Geographically, Bethania Township occupies 23.20 square miles (60.1 km^{2}) in northern Forsyth County. The town of Rural Hall is located here as well as part of the town of Bethania.
