= Broadbay Township, Forsyth County, North Carolina =

Township in Forsyth County, North Carolina

Coordinates: 36.0378623°N 80.1707662°W

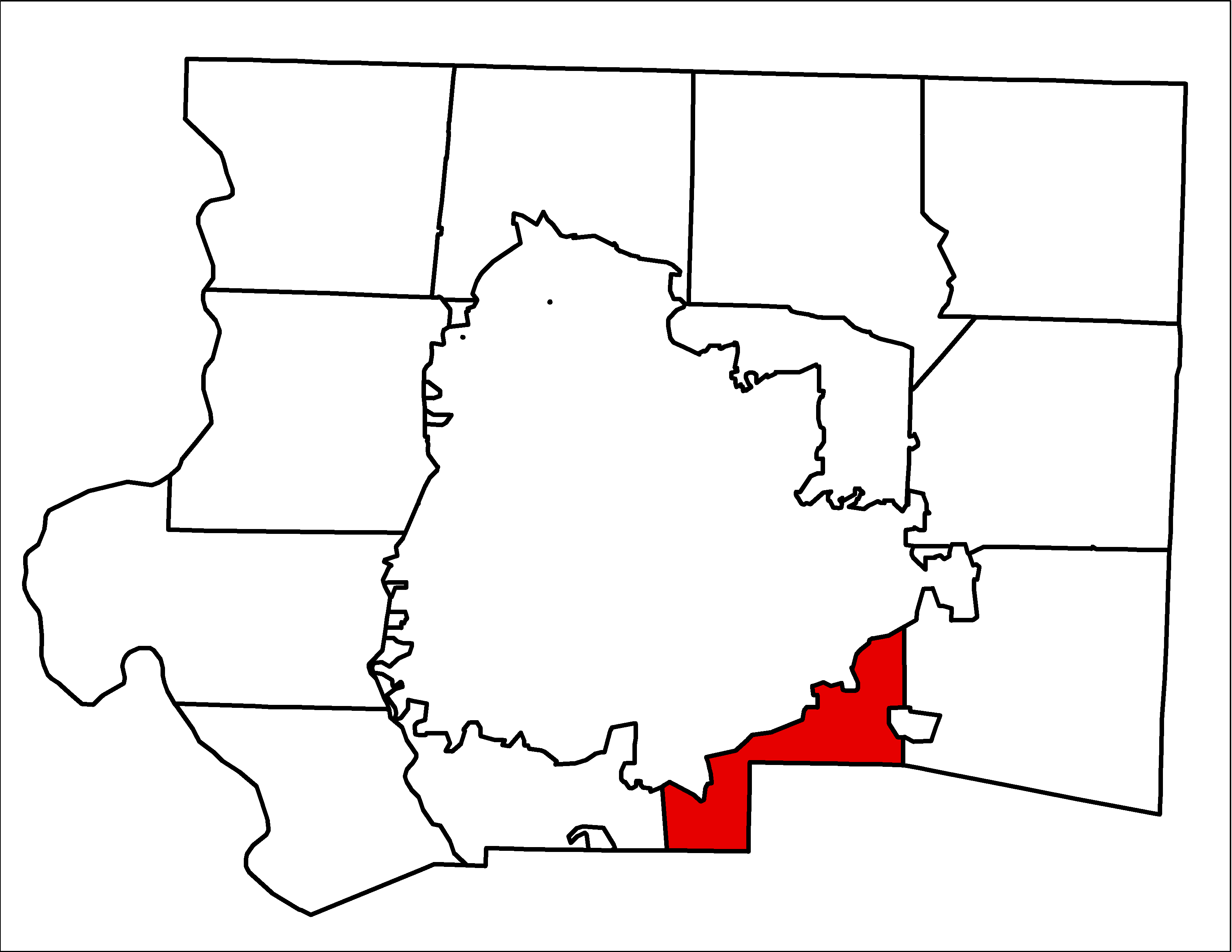
Location of Broadbay Township in Forsyth County, N.C.

Broadbay Township is one of fifteen townships in Forsyth County, North Carolina, United States. By the requirements of the North Carolina Constitution of 1868, the counties were divided into townships, which included Broadbay Township. The township had a population of 2,002 according to the 2010 census.

The name "Broadbay" is an interesting one 300 miles (480 km) from the coast. Settlers who came in 1770 to join the Moravian Church and found the settlement of Friedland originated from Waldoboro, Maine, a town known at the time as "Broad Bay". The settlers named the new area in Wachovia after their former town on the coast of Maine.

Geographically, Broadbay Township occupies 6.25 square miles (16.2 km^{2}) in southern Forsyth County. There are no incorporated municipalities in Broadbay Township and much of the original township has been annexed by the City of Winston-Salem and made part of Winston Township.
