= South Fork Township, Forsyth County, North Carolina =

Township in Forsyth County, North Carolina, U.S.

Coordinates: 36.0173914°N 80.3157397°W

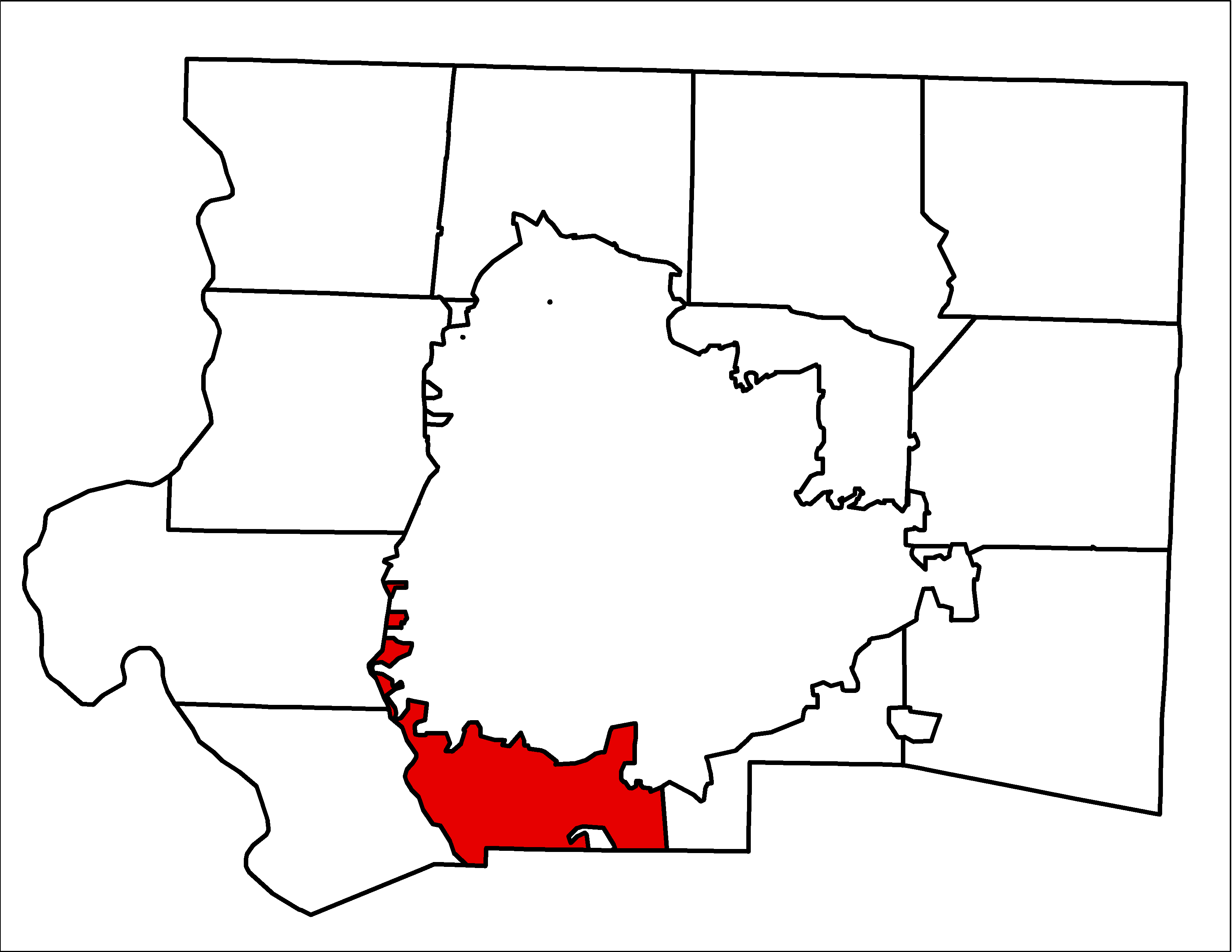
Location of South Fork Township in Forsyth County, N.C.

South Fork Township is one of fifteen townships in Forsyth County, North Carolina, United States. The township had a population of 2,576 according to the 2010 census.

South Fork Township occupies 10.54 square miles (27.3 km^{2}) in southern Forsyth County. There are no incorporated municipalities in South Fork and much of the original township has been annexed by the City of Winston-Salem and made part of Winston Township.
