= Arts Council of Winston-Salem Forsyth County =

US non-profit organization

Arts Council of Winston-Salem and Forsyth County, covering Winston-Salem and Forsyth County, North Carolina, US, claims to have been the first (1949) locally established arts council in the United States. Now there are more than 4,000. Arts Council raises funds for the arts, advocates for the arts, sponsors events with other arts organizations, provides educational opportunities, develops social capital, and assists economic development. It relies on volunteers and contributors (both private and public) to run effectively.

Arts Council employs 12 full-time staff members, and has an active Board of Trustees with more than 30 members.

== History ==
Arts Council was founded in 1949 with $7,200 in seed money from the Junior League of Winston-Salem. They were the first arts council created in the United States and continue to be a model for similar organizations throughout the country. In the late 1980s, city and county leaders recognized Arts Council as the official local arts agency for public arts funding. The organization raises funds on an annual basis to support artists and arts and cultural organizations. Arts Council owns and operates a campus in Downtown Winston-Salem that includes three theatres (Hanesbrands Theatre, Reynolds Place Theatre, and Mountcastle Forum), two galleries (Main Gallery and Associated Artists of Winston-Salem's Three Corners Gallery, Sawtooth School for Visual Art (tenant), and an extension building that is home to The Little Theatre of Winston-Salem and North Carolina Black Reparatory.

== Community impact ==
Arts Council states that for 75 years, it has aimed to "provide proactive leadership and spark cultural growth." Their sponsored programs provide arts education to school children, help artists advance their careers, and help organizations in the community provide performances, exhibits and events throughout the year. It is estimated that annually they reach 800,000 local residents and school children through programs and initiatives. The arts have a substantial economic impact on Winston-Salem and Forsyth County.
