= Middle Fork =

Middle Fork may refer to:

- Middle Fork, Kentucky
- Middle Fork River (South Fork), part of the South Fork New River in North Carolina.
- Middle Fork, Tennessee
- Middle Fork, West Virginia
- Middle Fork River, West Virginia
- Middle Fork Popo Agie River in Wyoming

== See also ==
- Middle Fork Township (disambaguation)
- Middlefork (disambiguation)
