= Dozier, North Carolina =

- Unincorporated community
- Location within North Carolina Location within the United States
- Coordinates: 36°11′31″N 80°24′22″W
- Country: United States
- State: North Carolina
- County: Forsyth
- Time zone: UTC-5 (Eastern (EST))
  - Summer (DST): UTC-4 (EDT)

Dozier is an unincorporated community located in Forsyth County, North Carolina, United States, near the Yadkin River. It is mostly centered at the junction of Vienna-Dozier and Waller Roads.
