= Middle Fork Township, Forsyth County, North Carolina =

Township in Forsyth County, North Carolina, U.S.

Coordinates: 36°10′18″N 80°11′37″W

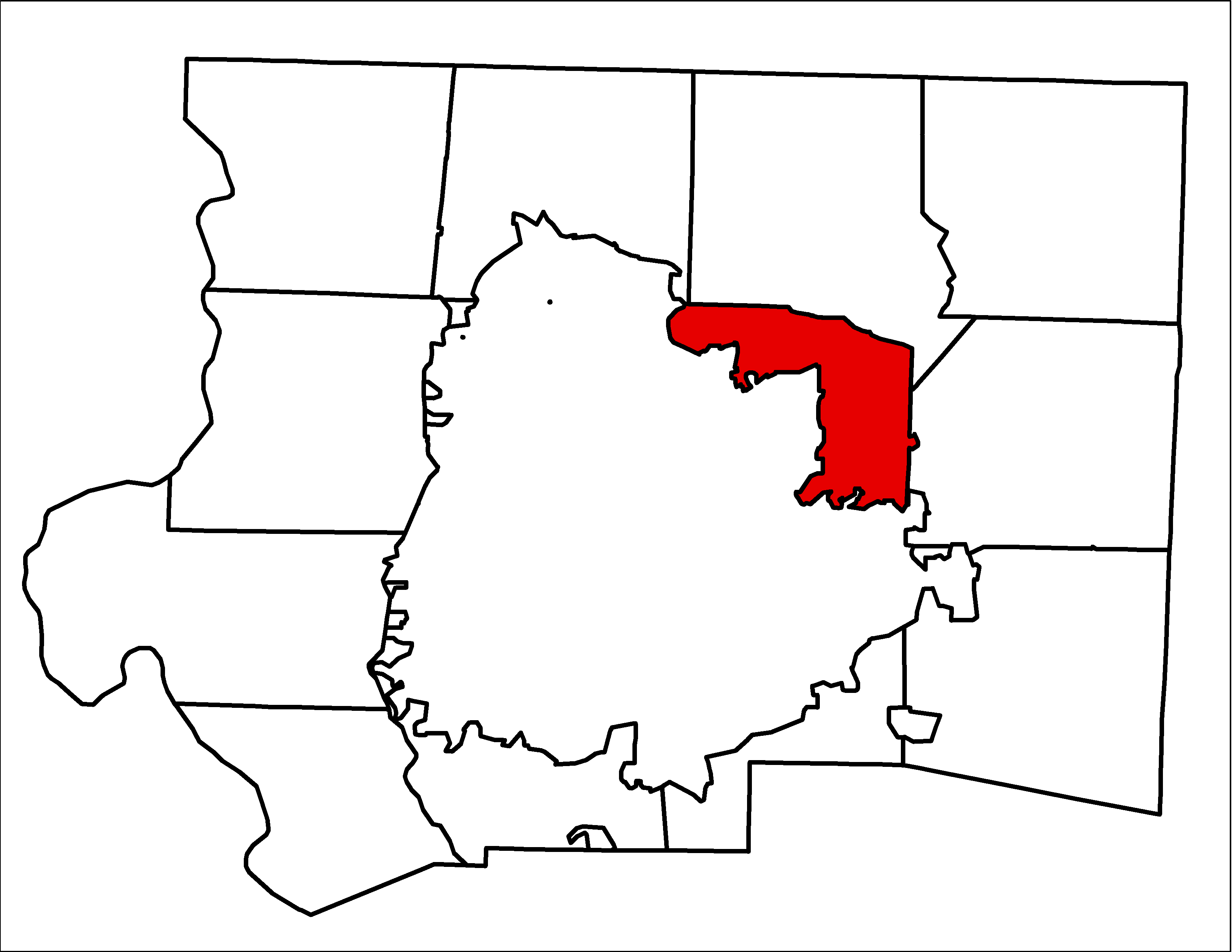
Location of Middle Fork Township in Forsyth County, N.C.

Middle Fork Township is a former township in Forsyth County, North Carolina, United States. The township had a population of 6,779 according to the 2000 census. In 2003, Middle Fork Township split into Middle Fork I Township and Middle Fork II Township.

Geographically, Middle Fork Township occupied 12.93 square miles (33.5 km^{2}) in central Forsyth County. Much of Middle Fork Township consists of the town of Walkertown. Additionally, much of the original township has been annexed by the City of Winston-Salem and made part of Winston Township.

Historical population
Census	Pop.	Note	%±
1870	1,046		—
1880	1,386		32.5%
1890	1,496		7.9%
1900	2,606		74.2%
1910	2,774		6.4%
1920	3,035		9.4%
1930	6,456		112.7%
1940	9,011		39.6%
1950	11,051		22.6%
1960	14,966		35.4%
1970	7,057		−52.8%
1980	9,011		27.7%
1990	9,160		1.7%
2000	6,779		−26.0%
