= Clemmonsville Township, Forsyth County, North Carolina =

Township in Forsyth County, North Carolina, U.S.

Coordinates: 36.0187511°N 80.3992652°W

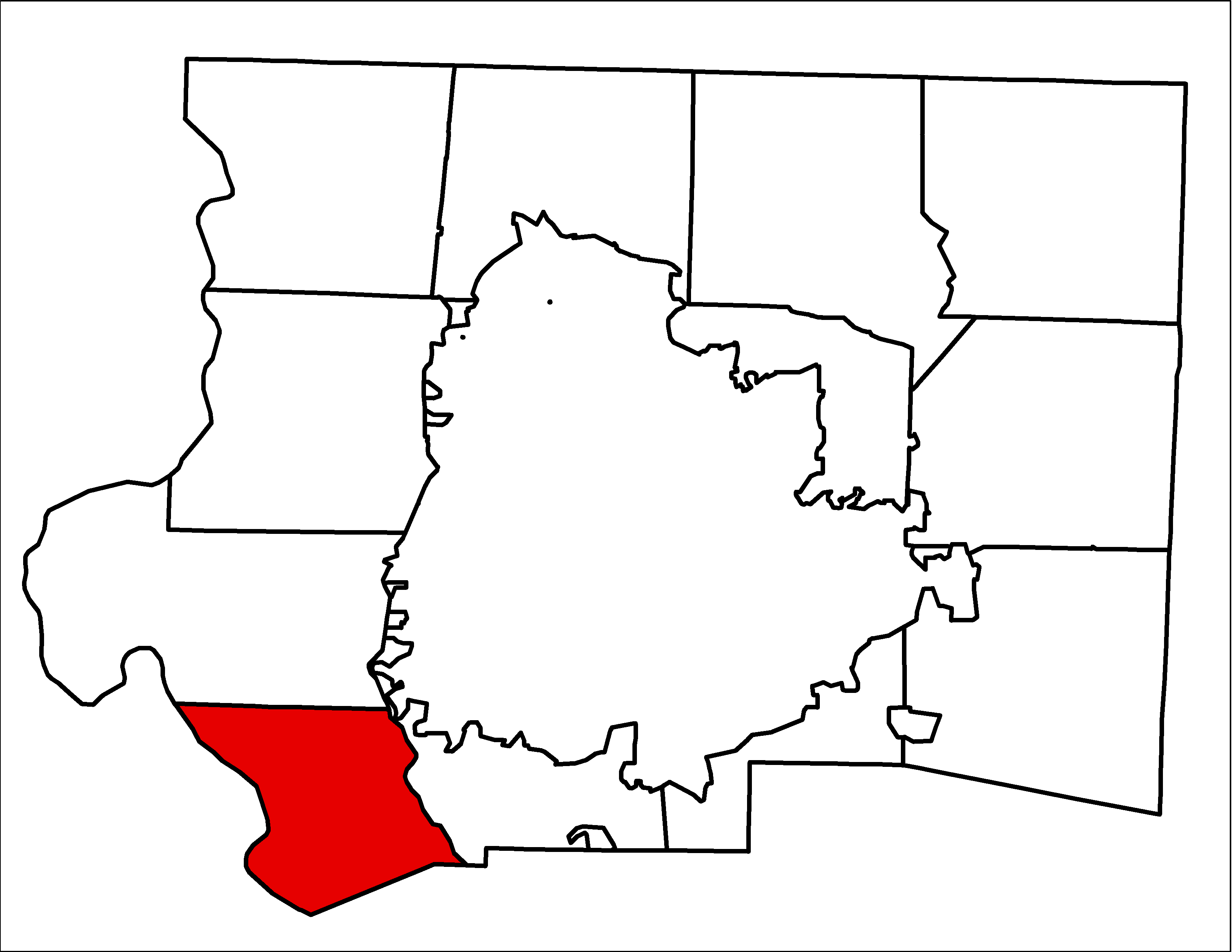
Location of Clemmonsville Township in Forsyth County, N.C.

Clemmonsville Township is one of fifteen townships in Forsyth County, North Carolina, United States. The township had a population of 14,927 according to the 2010 census.

Geographically, Clemmonsville Township occupies 18.60 square miles (48.2 km^{2}) in southwestern Forsyth County. The only incorporated municipality in Clemmonsville Township is the village of Clemmons. The township fronts the Yadkin River on its western boundary.
