= Belews Creek, Missouri =

Unincorporated community in Missouri, U.S.

Coordinates: 38°17′57″N 90°34′00″W

Belews Creek is an populated place 705 feet above sea level in Jefferson County, in the U.S. state of Missouri.

== History ==
A post office called Belews Creek was established in 1856, and remained in operation until 1905. The community was named after early settler Silas Belews.
