= Middle Fork II Township, Forsyth County, North Carolina =

Middle Fork II Township
- Township
- Location within North Carolina
- Coordinates: 36°08′29″N 80°09′46″W
- Country: United States
- State: North Carolina
- County: Forsyth

Area
  - Total: 6.315 sq mi (16.36 km^{2})
  - Land: 6.293 sq mi (16.30 km^{2})
  - Water: 0.022 sq mi (0.057 km^{2}) 0.35%
- Elevation: 876 ft (267 m)

Population (2010)
  - Total: 2,639
  - Density: 419.4/sq mi (161.9/km^{2})
- GNIS feature ID: 1987578

Middle Fork II Township is a township in Forsyth County, North Carolina, United States. As of the 2010 Census, it had a population of 2,639. The township covers an area of 6.315 square miles (16.36 km^{2}). Middle Fork II Township was formed in April 2003, when Middle Fork Township was split into Middle Fork II Township and Middle Fork I Township.
