= Abbotts Creek Township, Forsyth County, North Carolina =

Coordinates: 36.046157°N 80.0758425°W

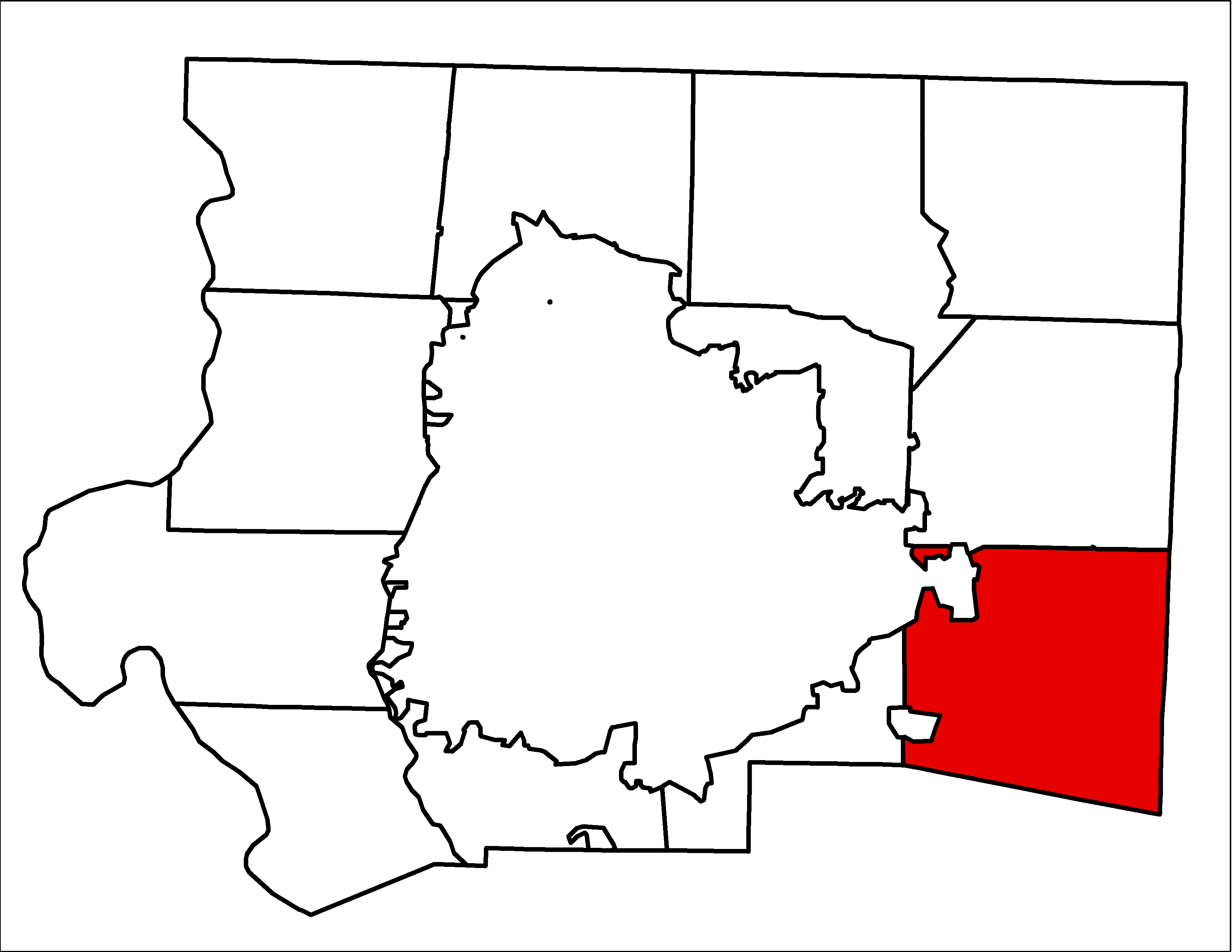
Location of Abbotts Creek Township in Forsyth County, N.C.

Abbotts Creek Township is one of fifteen townships in Forsyth County, North Carolina, United States. The township had a population of 11,310 according to the 2010 census.

Geographically, Abbotts Creek Township occupies 26.84 square miles (69.5 km^{2}) in southeastern Forsyth County. Abbotts Creek Township contains portions of the town of Kernersville and the city of High Point, as well as the unincorporated community of Union Cross.
