= Vienna, North Carolina =

- Unincorporated community
- Location within North Carolina Location within the United States
- Coordinates: 36°8′17″N 80°24′7″W
- Country: United States
- State: North Carolina
- County: Forsyth
- Time zone: UTC-5 (Eastern (EST))
  - Summer (DST): UTC-4 (EDT)

Vienna is a small unincorporated community located in Forsyth County, North Carolina, United States. The community is mostly centered at Vienna-Dozier Road and Yadkinville Road. Vienna was once incorporated in 1794 (Powell 1968, p. 291).

Lewisville annexed Vienna June 30, 2004, despite protests from many area residents. Vienna has continued to exist as a separate community.
