= Middle Fork I Township, Forsyth County, North Carolina =

Middle Fork I Township
- Township
- Location within North Carolina
- Coordinates: 36°10′11″N 80°12′24″W
- Country: United States
- State: North Carolina
- County: Forsyth

Area
  - Total: 2.448 sq mi (6.34 km^{2})
  - Land: 2.437 sq mi (6.31 km^{2})
  - Water: 0.011 sq mi (0.028 km^{2}) 0.45%
- Elevation: 948 ft (289 m)

Population (2010)
  - Total: 1,710
  - Density: 702/sq mi (271/km^{2})
- GNIS feature ID: 1987577

Middle Fork I Township is a township in Forsyth County, North Carolina, United States. As of the 2010 Census, it had a population of 1,710. The township covers an area of 2.448 square miles (6.34 km^{2}). Middle Fork I Township was formed in April 2003, when Middle Fork Township was split into Middle Fork I Township and Middle Fork II Township.
