= Belews Creek Township, Forsyth County, North Carolina =

Township in Forsyth County, North Carolina, U.S.

Coordinates: 36.2182892°N 80.0758425°W

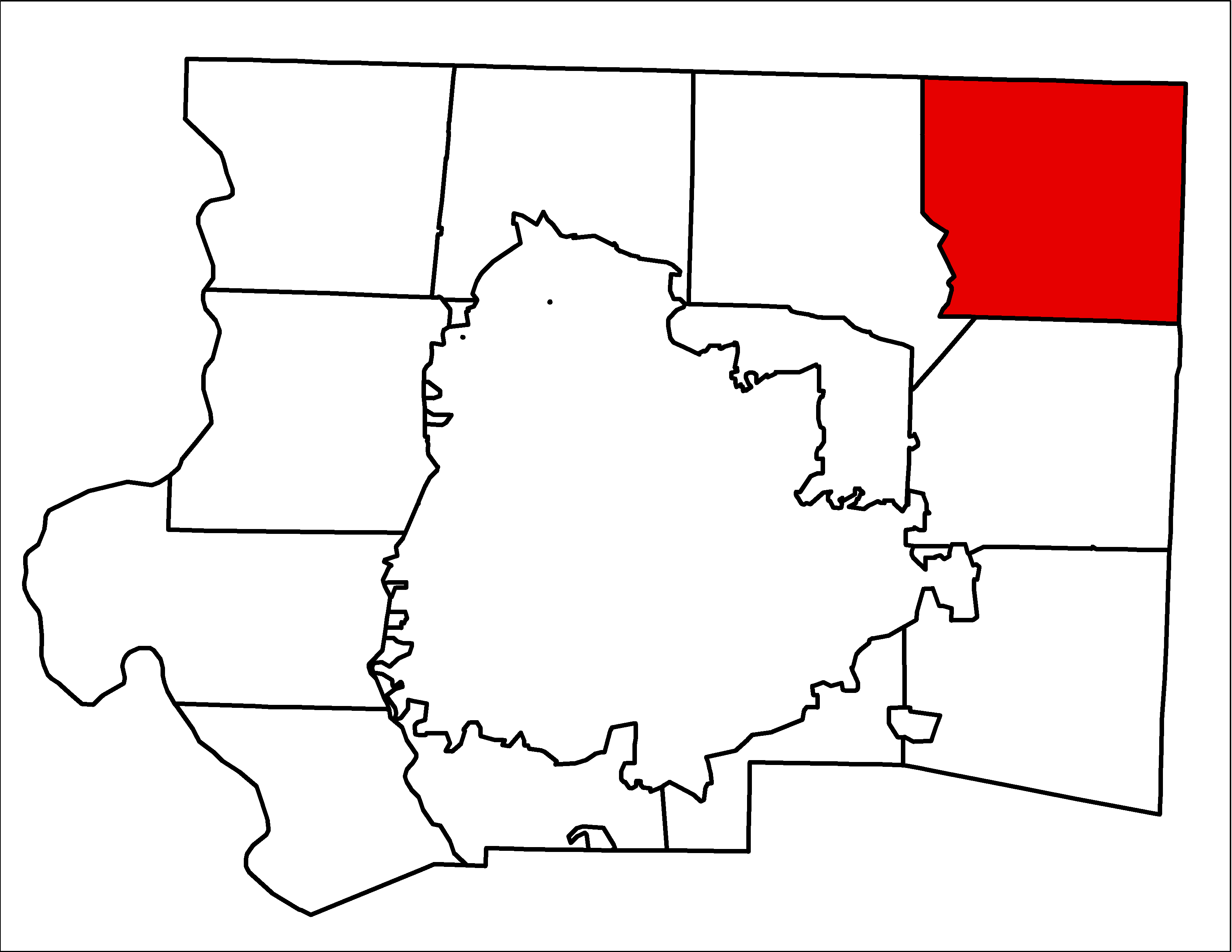
Location of Belews Creek Township in Forsyth County, N.C.

Belews Creek Township is one of fifteen townships in Forsyth County, North Carolina, United States. The township had a population of 2,647 according to the 2010 census.

Geographically, Belews Creek Township occupies 32.33 square miles (83.7 km^{2}) in central Forsyth County. There are no incorporated municipalities in Belews Creek Township however, the small unincorporated community of Belews Creek is located here.
