= Forsyth County, North Carolina =

County in North Carolina, United States

- County
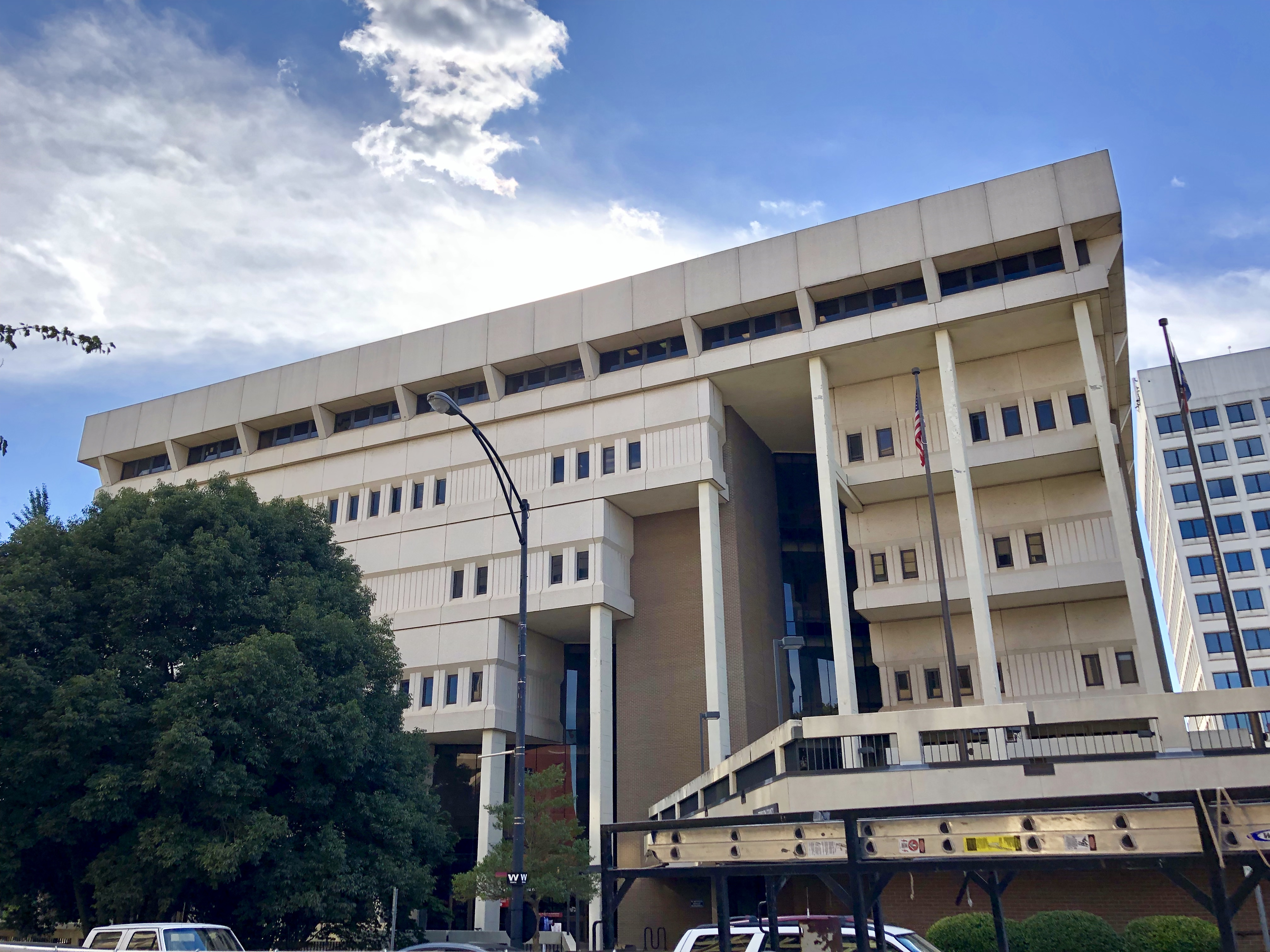
- Forsyth County Courthouse in Winston-Salem

- Flag Seal Logo

- Location within the U.S. state of North Carolina
- Interactive map of Forsyth County, North Carolina
- Coordinates: 36.13°N 80.26°W
- Country: United States
- State: North Carolina
- Founded: 1849
- Named for: Benjamin Forsyth
- Seat: Winston-Salem
- Largest community: Winston-Salem

Area
  - Total: 412.35 sq mi (1,068.0 km^{2})
  - Land: 407.85 sq mi (1,056.3 km^{2})
  - Water: 4.50 sq mi (11.7 km^{2}) 1.09%

Population (2020)
  - Total: 382,590
  - Estimate (2025): 401,718 ▲
  - Density: 937.7/sq mi (362.0/km^{2})
- Time zone: UTC−5 (Eastern)
  - Summer (DST): UTC−4 (EDT)
- Congressional districts: 6th, 10th
- Website: www.co.forsyth.nc.us

Forsyth County (/foʊrˈsaɪθ/ fohr-SYTH) is a county located in the northwest Piedmont of the U.S. state of North Carolina. As of the 2020 census, the population was 382,590, making it the fourth-most populous county in North Carolina. Its county seat is Winston-Salem. Forsyth County is part of the Winston-Salem, NC, Metropolitan Statistical Area, which is also included in the Greensboro–Winston-Salem–High Point, NC, Combined Statistical Area. Portions of Forsyth County are in the Yadkin Valley wine region.

== History ==
The county was formed in 1849 from Stokes County. It was named for Colonel Benjamin Forsyth, who was killed in the War of 1812.

== Geography ==
According to the U.S. Census Bureau, the county is in the outer Appalachian Mountains, and has a total area of 412.35 square miles (1,068.0 km^{2}), of which 407.85 square miles (1,056.3 km^{2}) is land and 4.50 square miles (11.7 km^{2}) (1.09%) is water. The county is also located west of the overall-Metropolitan Center of NC; Guilford County and the Greensboro-High Point area, in which Forsyth County is considered to be west of the Metropolitan Center, replacing the previous designation of Forsyth County being "the center."

The northeast section of Forsyth County, including Belews Creek, certain areas of Rural Hall, Walkertown, and the northern outkirts of Kernersville, is drained by tributaries of the Dan River. A small portion of Kernersville is in the Cape Fear River basin. Most of the county is drained by tributaries of the Yadkin River, which forms the western boundary of the county. The lowest elevation in the county is 660 feet (200 meters), on the Yadkin River at the southwest corner of the county. The highest is 1,100 feet (340 meters), at a point just off Jefferson Church Road on the outskirts of King, immediately south of the county line.

=== State and local protected areas and sites ===
- Cascades Preserve (part)
- Emily Allen Wildflower Preserve
- Historic Bethabara Park
- Kaleideum
- Old Salem Museums & Gardens
- Shell-Shaped Shell Station
- Tanglewood Park

=== Major water bodies ===
- Abbotts Creek
- Belews Creek
- Belews Lake
- Beaver Dam Creek
- Brushy Creek
- Blanket Creek
- Buffalo Creek
- Crooked Run Creek
- Lick Creek
- Little Creek
- Little Yadkin River
- Mill Creek
- Muddy Creek
- Old Field Creek
- Reedy Fork
- Salem Creek
- Silas Creek
- South Fork Muddy Creek
- Yadkin River

=== Adjacent counties ===
- Stokes County – north
- Rockingham County – northeast
- Guilford County – east
- Davidson County – south
- Davie County – southwest
- Yadkin County – west
- Surry County – northwest

=== Major highways ===
- I-40
- I-74 / Future I-74 (designated section from US 52 to county line with Guilford County)
- Future I-274 (future loop around Winston-Salem)
- I-285
- US 52
- US 158
- US 311
- US 421
- NC 8
- NC 65
- NC 66
- NC 67
- NC 109
- NC 150
- NC 192
- NC 452 (future temporary highway designation for I-274)

=== Major infrastructure ===
- Amtrak Thruway (Winston-Salem)
- Smith Reynolds Airport

== Demographics ==
Historical population
| Census | Pop. | Note | %± |
|---|---|---|---|
| 1850 | 11,168 | | — |
| 1860 | 12,692 | | 13.6% |
| 1870 | 13,050 | | 2.8% |
| 1880 | 18,070 | | 38.5% |
| 1890 | 28,434 | | 57.4% |
| 1900 | 35,261 | | 24.0% |
| 1910 | 47,311 | | 34.2% |
| 1920 | 77,269 | | 63.3% |
| 1930 | 111,681 | | 44.5% |
| 1940 | 126,475 | | 13.2% |
| 1950 | 146,135 | | 15.5% |
| 1960 | 189,428 | | 29.6% |
| 1970 | 214,348 | | 13.2% |
| 1980 | 243,683 | | 13.7% |
| 1990 | 265,878 | | 9.1% |
| 2000 | 306,067 | | 15.1% |
| 2010 | 350,670 | | 14.6% |
| 2020 | 382,590 | | 9.1% |
| 2025 (est.) | 401,718 | ▲ | 5.0% |
U.S. Decennial Census; 1790–1960 1900–1990; 1990–2000 2010 2020

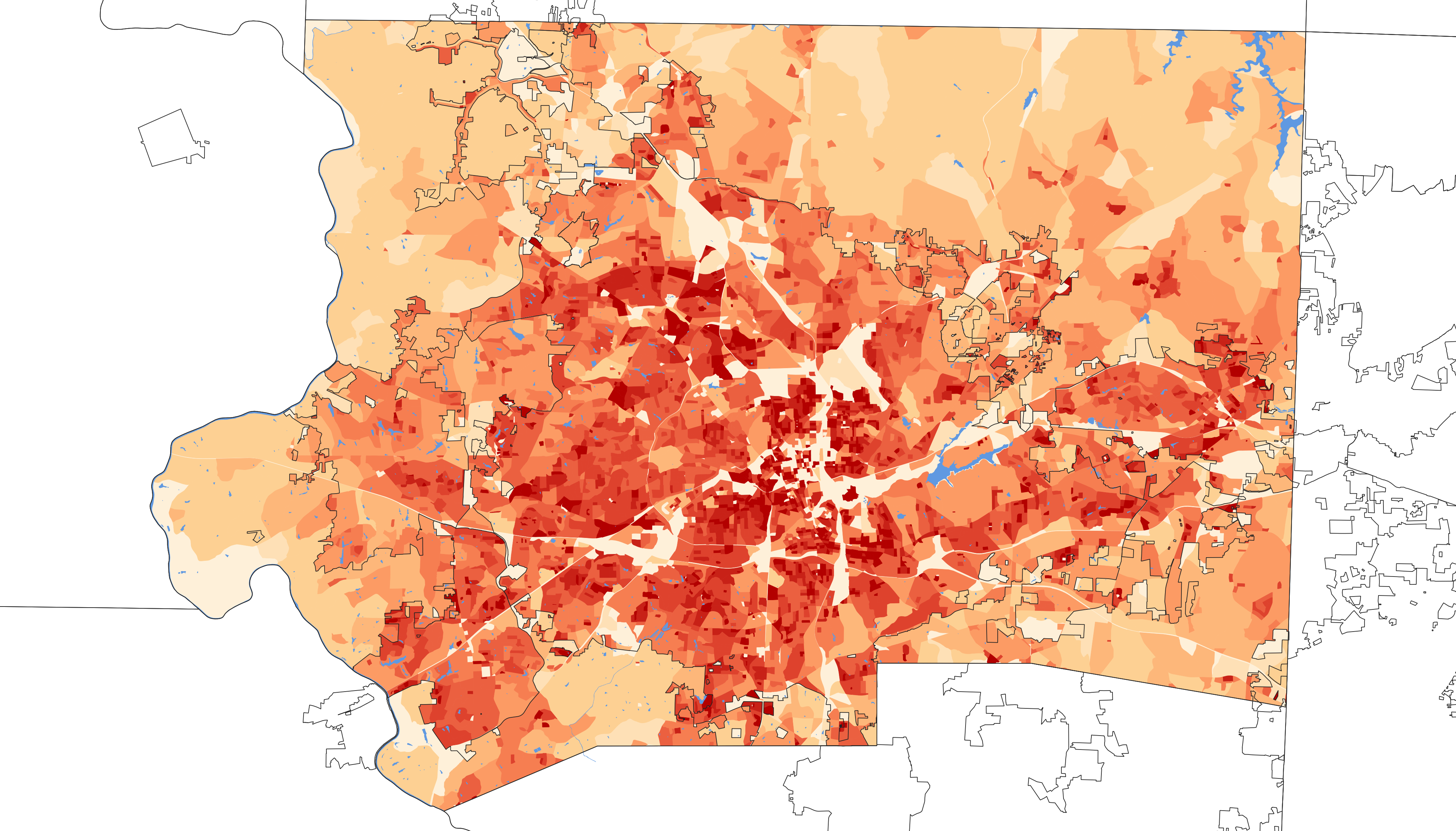
2020 population density of Forsyth County NC by census block

=== 2020 census ===
Forsyth County, North Carolina – Racial and ethnic composition Note: the US Census treats Hispanic/Latino as an ethnic category. This table excludes Latinos from the racial categories and assigns them to a separate category. Hispanics/Latinos may be of any race.
| Race / Ethnicity (NH = Non-Hispanic) | Pop 1980 | Pop 1990 | Pop 2000 | Pop 2010 | Pop 2020 | % 1980 | % 1990 | % 2000 | % 2010 | % 2020 |
|---|---|---|---|---|---|---|---|---|---|---|
| White alone (NH) | 181,724 | 195,660 | 202,338 | 205,934 | 208,126 | 74.57% | 73.59% | 66.11% | 58.73% | 54.40% |
| Black or African American alone (NH) | 58,938 | 65,858 | 77,041 | 89,533 | 93,738 | 24.19% | 24.77% | 25.17% | 25.53% | 24.50% |
| Native American or Alaska Native alone (NH) | 452 | 535 | 783 | 894 | 978 | 0.19% | 0.20% | 0.26% | 0.25% | 0.26% |
| Asian alone (NH) | 660 | 1,639 | 3,133 | 6,427 | 9,179 | 0.27% | 0.62% | 1.02% | 1.83% | 2.40% |
| Native Hawaiian or Pacific Islander alone (NH) | x | x | 70 | 156 | 233 | x | x | 0.02% | 0.04% | 0.06% |
| Other race alone (NH) | 334 | 84 | 397 | 696 | 1,623 | 0.14% | 0.03% | 0.13% | 0.20% | 0.42% |
| Mixed race or Multiracial (NH) | x | x | 2,728 | 5,255 | 14,025 | x | x | 0.89% | 1.50% | 3.67% |
| Hispanic or Latino (any race) | 1,575 | 2,102 | 19,577 | 41,775 | 54,688 | 0.65% | 0.79% | 6.40% | 11.91% | 14.29% |
| Total | 243,683 | 265,878 | 306,067 | 350,670 | 382,590 | 100.00% | 100.00% | 100.00% | 100.00% | 100.00% |

As of the 2020 census, there were 382,590 people, 156,635 households, and 90,837 families residing in the county. The median age was 38.8 years, with 22.3% of residents under the age of 18 and 17.1% 65 years of age or older. For every 100 females there were 89.8 males, and for every 100 females age 18 and over there were 86.3 males.

The racial makeup of the county was 56.2% White, 24.9% Black or African American, 0.7% American Indian and Alaska Native, 2.4% Asian, 0.1% Native Hawaiian and Pacific Islander, 8.4% from some other race, and 7.3% from two or more races. Hispanic or Latino residents of any race comprised 14.3% of the population.

92.4% of residents lived in urban areas, while 7.6% lived in rural areas.

There were 156,635 households in the county, of which 28.9% had children under the age of 18 living in them. Of all households, 42.2% were married-couple households, 18.8% were households with a male householder and no spouse or partner present, and 32.8% were households with a female householder and no spouse or partner present. About 31.7% of all households were made up of individuals and 12.2% had someone living alone who was 65 years of age or older.

There were 170,176 housing units, of which 8.0% were vacant. Among occupied housing units, 60.6% were owner-occupied and 39.4% were renter-occupied. The homeowner vacancy rate was 1.6% and the rental vacancy rate was 9.0%.

=== 2000 census ===
At the 2000 census, there were 306,067 people, 123,851 households, and 81,741 families residing in the county. The population density was 747 people per square mile (288 people/km^{2}). There were 133,093 housing units, at an average density of 325 units per square mile (125 units/km^{2}). The racial makeup was 68.47% White, 25.61% Black or African American, 0.30% Native American, 1.04% Asian, 0.03% Pacific Islander, 3.25% from other races, and 1.30% from two or more races. 6.40% of the population were Hispanic or Latino of any race.

There were 123,851 households, out of which 30.50% had children under the age of 18 living with them, 48.90% were married couples living together, 13.50% had a female householder with no husband present, and 34.00% were non-families. 28.90% of all households were made up of individuals, and 9.30% had someone living alone who was 65 years of age or older. The average household size was 2.39, and the average family size was 2.94.

Map of census tracts in Forsyth County by racial plurality, per the 2020 US Census Legend: | Non-Hispanic White 30–40% 40–50% 50–60% 60–70% 70–80% 80–90% 90%+ | Black or African American 30–40% 40–50% 50–60% 60–70% 70–80% 80–90% Hispanic or Latino 40–50% |

The median age was 36 years, with 23.90% under the age of 18, 9.60% from 18 to 24, 31.10% from 25 to 44, 22.80% from 45 to 64, and 12.60% who were 65 years of age or older. For every 100 females there were 91.50 males. For every 100 females age 18 and over, there were 87.40 males.

The median household income was $42,097, and the median family income was $52,032. Males had a median income of $36,158, versus $27,319 for females. The per capita income was $23,023. About 7.90% of families and 11.00% of the population were below the poverty line, including 15.10% of those under age 18 and 9.70% of those age 65 or over.

== Law and government ==
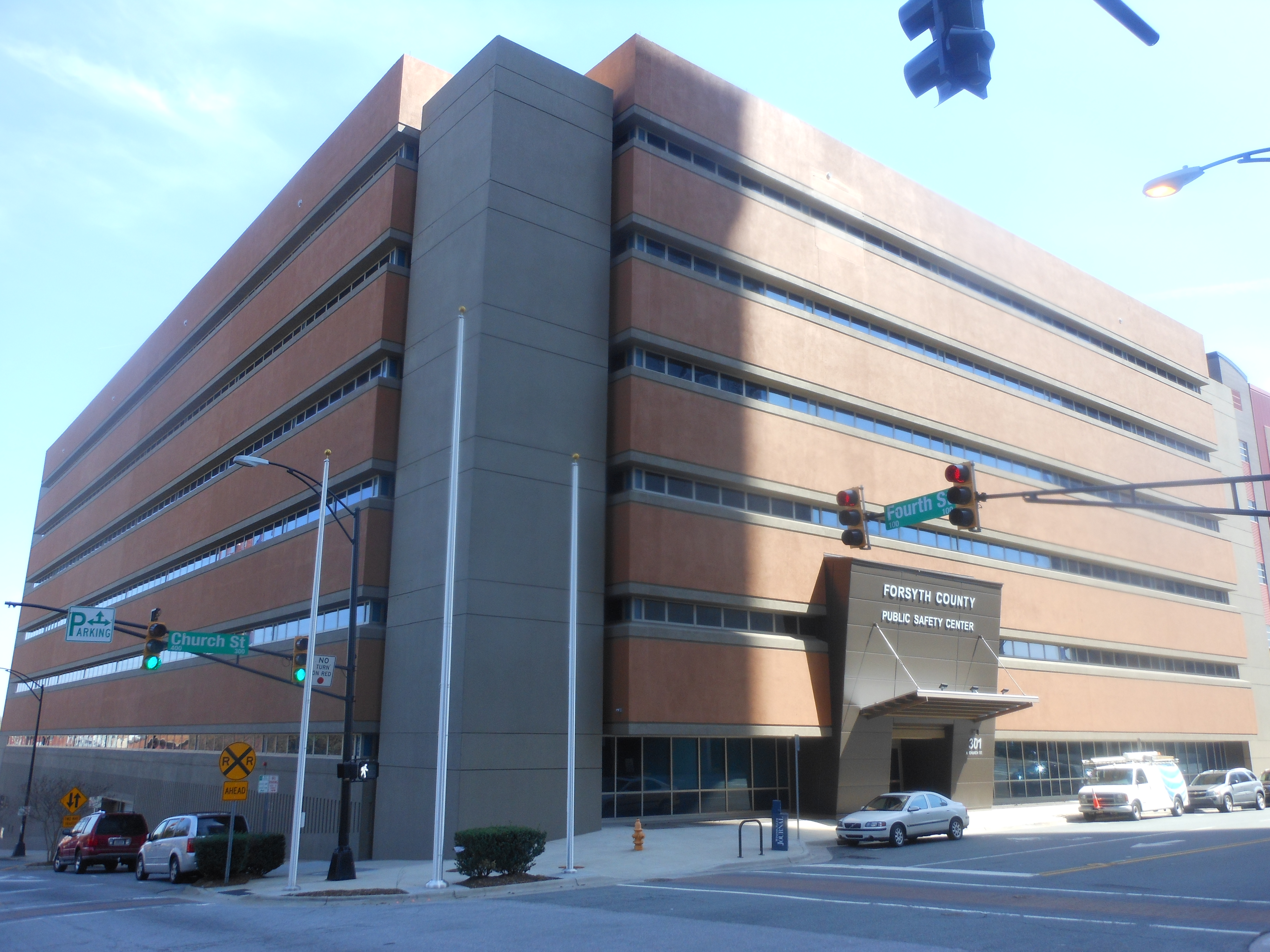
Forsyth County Public Safety Center

The Forsyth County Government Center is located at 201 North Chestnut Street in Downtown Winston-Salem. Forsyth County is a member of the regional Northwest Piedmont Council of Governments.

The Forsyth County Public Library, founded in 1906, is free for residents of Forsyth and surrounding counties, while all others must pay a small yearly fee for a library card. The library runs Adult, Children's, and Hispanic Outreach programs. Its main "Central Library" is in downtown Winston-Salem, with branches all across the county.

Forsyth County Public Library is part of NC Cardinal, a consortium of many other library systems in North Carolina.

The Forsyth County Department of Public Health is located at 799 North Highland Avenue near downtown Winston-Salem.

=== Politics ===
Forsyth County typically favors Democratic candidates in national elections, though Republicans remain competitive in local races.

United States presidential election results for Forsyth County, North Carolina
| Year | Republican | | Democratic | | Third party(ies) | |
| Year | No. | % | No. | % | No. | % |
|---|---|---|---|---|---|---|
| 1880 | 1,791 | 49.42% | 1,778 | 49.06% | 55 | 1.52% |
| 1884 | 1,941 | 48.46% | 2,060 | 51.44% | 4 | 0.10% |
| 1888 | 2,613 | 53.28% | 2,238 | 45.64% | 53 | 1.08% |
| 1892 | 2,447 | 42.13% | 2,880 | 49.59% | 481 | 8.28% |
| 1896 | 3,888 | 57.85% | 2,778 | 41.33% | 55 | 0.82% |
| 1900 | 2,588 | 50.77% | 2,482 | 48.70% | 27 | 0.53% |
| 1904 | 2,209 | 47.94% | 2,301 | 49.93% | 98 | 2.13% |
| 1908 | 2,876 | 52.28% | 2,472 | 44.94% | 153 | 2.78% |
| 1912 | 1,689 | 26.72% | 3,042 | 48.12% | 1,591 | 25.17% |
| 1916 | 3,585 | 45.16% | 4,115 | 51.84% | 238 | 3.00% |
| 1920 | 6,792 | 45.54% | 8,123 | 54.46% | 0 | 0.00% |
| 1924 | 5,315 | 40.33% | 7,404 | 56.18% | 459 | 3.48% |
| 1928 | 13,258 | 66.63% | 6,639 | 33.37% | 0 | 0.00% |
| 1932 | 5,727 | 28.49% | 14,016 | 69.73% | 357 | 1.78% |
| 1936 | 5,256 | 21.91% | 18,734 | 78.09% | 0 | 0.00% |
| 1940 | 7,125 | 25.64% | 20,664 | 74.36% | 0 | 0.00% |
| 1944 | 10,014 | 37.93% | 16,390 | 62.07% | 0 | 0.00% |
| 1948 | 10,147 | 41.04% | 12,201 | 49.35% | 2,377 | 9.61% |
| 1952 | 26,436 | 51.86% | 24,535 | 48.14% | 0 | 0.00% |
| 1956 | 29,368 | 64.99% | 15,819 | 35.01% | 0 | 0.00% |
| 1960 | 33,374 | 58.13% | 24,035 | 41.87% | 0 | 0.00% |
| 1964 | 30,276 | 48.92% | 31,615 | 51.08% | 0 | 0.00% |
| 1968 | 31,623 | 46.79% | 20,281 | 30.01% | 15,681 | 23.20% |
| 1972 | 46,415 | 67.69% | 20,928 | 30.52% | 1,226 | 1.79% |
| 1976 | 38,886 | 49.34% | 39,561 | 50.20% | 361 | 0.46% |
| 1980 | 42,389 | 49.99% | 38,870 | 45.84% | 3,539 | 4.17% |
| 1984 | 59,208 | 61.54% | 36,814 | 38.26% | 189 | 0.20% |
| 1988 | 57,688 | 59.02% | 39,726 | 40.65% | 321 | 0.33% |
| 1992 | 52,787 | 45.40% | 49,006 | 42.15% | 14,481 | 12.45% |
| 1996 | 59,160 | 52.81% | 46,543 | 41.54% | 6,330 | 5.65% |
| 2000 | 67,700 | 55.98% | 52,457 | 43.37% | 785 | 0.65% |
| 2004 | 75,294 | 54.12% | 63,340 | 45.53% | 491 | 0.35% |
| 2008 | 73,674 | 44.35% | 91,085 | 54.83% | 1,374 | 0.83% |
| 2012 | 79,768 | 45.83% | 92,323 | 53.04% | 1,978 | 1.14% |
| 2016 | 75,975 | 42.61% | 94,464 | 52.98% | 7,873 | 4.42% |
| 2020 | 85,064 | 42.26% | 113,033 | 56.16% | 3,173 | 1.58% |
| 2024 | 87,292 | 42.64% | 114,145 | 55.76% | 3,289 | 1.61% |

== Education ==
All of Forsyth County is within the Winston-Salem/Forsyth County Schools school district.

== Communities ==
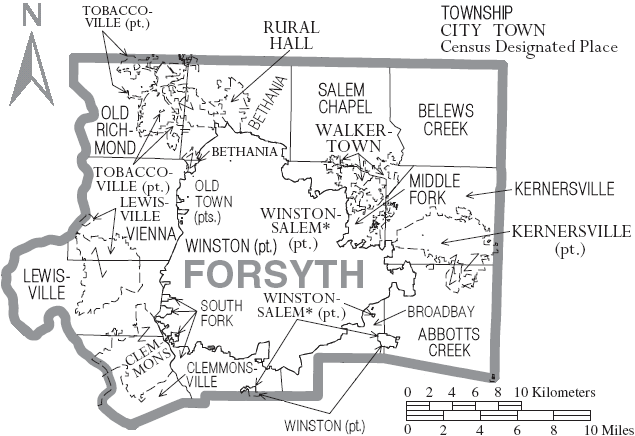
Map of Forsyth County with municipal and township labels

=== Cities ===
- Winston-Salem (county seat and largest community)
- High Point (mostly in Guilford County; also in Randolph County and Davidson County)
- King (mostly in Stokes County)

=== Towns ===
- Bethania
- Kernersville (partially in Guilford County)
- Lewisville
- Rural Hall
- Stokesdale (mostly in Guilford County)
- Walkertown

=== Villages ===
- Clemmons
- Tobaccoville (also in Stokes County)

=== Townships ===
- Abbots Creek
- Belews Creek
- Bethania
- Broadbay
- Clemmonsville
- Kernersville
- Lewisville
- Middle Fork I
- Middle Fork II
- Old Richmond
- Old Town
- Salem Chapel
- South Fork
- Vienna
- Winston

==== Former township ====
- Middle Fork Township was split into Middle Fork I Township and Middle Fork II Township in 2003.

=== Census-designated place ===
- Germanton

=== Unincorporated communities ===
- Belews Creek
- Bethabara
- Dennis
- Donnaha
- Dozier
- Horneytown
- Pfafftown
- Seward
- Stanleyville
- Union Cross
- Vienna

== See also ==
- List of counties in North Carolina
- National Register of Historic Places listings in Forsyth County, North Carolina
- Arts Council of Winston-Salem Forsyth County
- Adelaide Fries, author of the 1898 book, Forsyth County
