= Belews Creek, North Carolina =

- Unincorporated community
- Location within North Carolina Location within the United States
- Coordinates: 36°14′40″N 80°4′11″W
- Country: United States
- State: North Carolina
- County: Forsyth
- Named for: Belews Creek
- Time zone: UTC-5 (Eastern (EST))
  - Summer (DST): UTC-4 (EDT)
- ZIP codes: 27052

Belews Creek (sometimes, "Belew Creek") is an unincorporated community in the Belews Creek Township of Forsyth County, North Carolina, United States.

== History ==
Belews Creek was originally named "Belews Creek Mill" and a post office has been located in the community since 1831 (Powell 1968, p. 37).

== Demographics ==
Belews Creek's Zip Code Tabulation Area (Zip Code 27009) has a population of about 2,647 as of the 2010 census. The population is 50.6% male and 49.4% female. About 91% of the population is white, 7.4% African-American, 1.1% Hispanic, and 0.3% of other races. 0.7% of people are two or more races.

The median household income is $50,345 with 2.6% of the population living below the poverty line.

== Notable person ==
- Jester Hairston, actor

== See also ==
- Belews Creek Township
