= Middlefork =

Middlefork may refer to:

- Middlefork, Clinton County, Indiana
- Middlefork, Jefferson County, Indiana
- Middlefork Township, Vermilion County, Illinois
- Middlefork Methodist Episcopal Church, in Redding, Iowa
- Middlefork Township, Worth County, Missouri

== See also ==
- Middle Fork (disambiguation)
