= Vitra Schaudepot =

Museum on the Vitra Campus

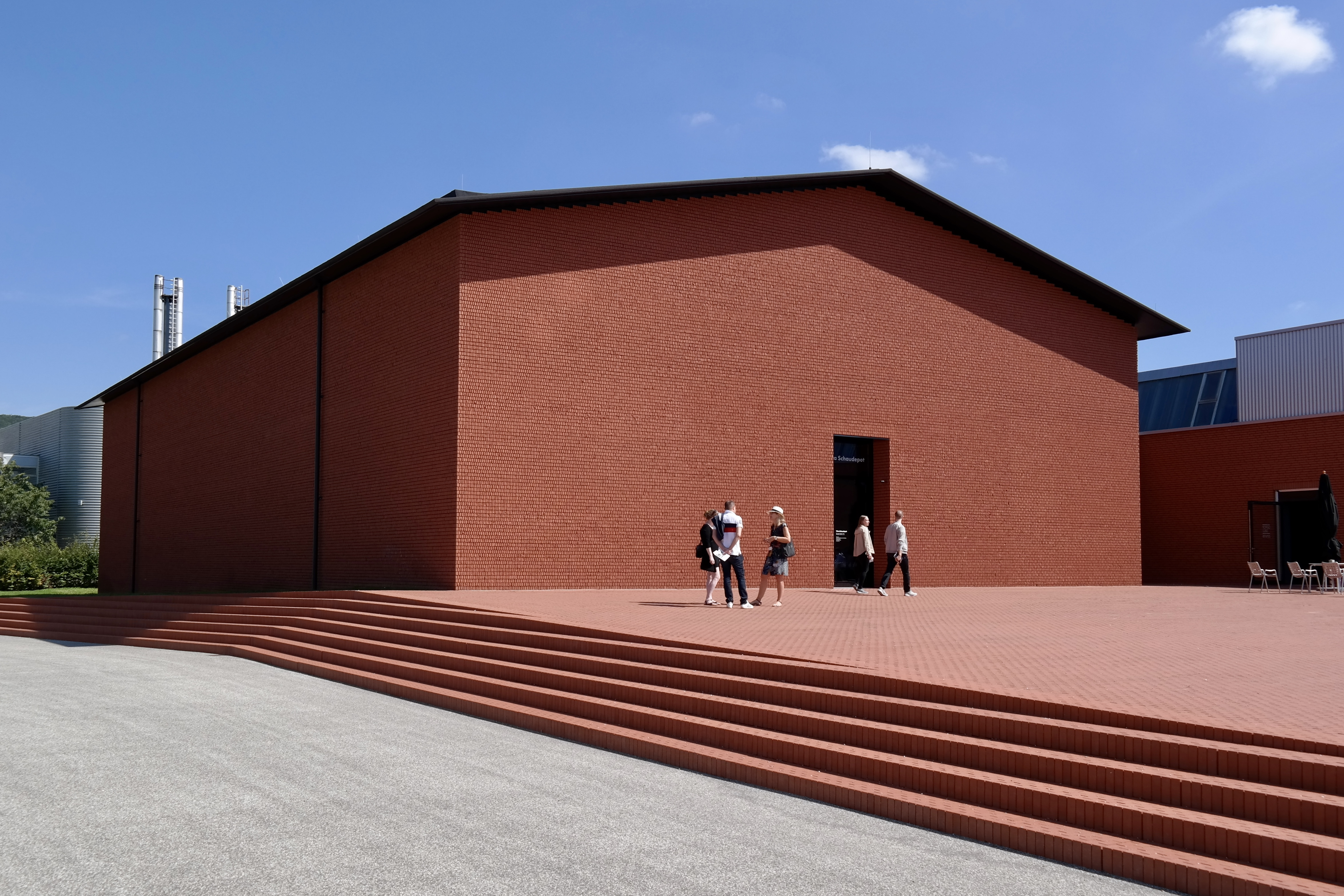
- Outside of Vitra Schaudepot

General information
- Location: Charles-Eames-Straße 2, Weil am Rhein, Germany
- Coordinates: 47.60003950913252°N 7.614762190087447°E
- Opened: June 2016
- Owner: Vitra

Design and construction
- Architect: Herzog & de Meuron

The Vitra Schaudepot is a museum on the Vitra Campus in Weil am Rhein, Germany. It was designed by Herzog & de Meuron and opened in the summer of 2016. It displays modern furniture pieces by Charles and Ray Eames, and other designers, from the Vitra Design Museum's collection, as well as part of the Barragán Archive, and numerous limited-time exhibitions. It also has a café and shop.

== History ==
The Vitra Schaudepot was imagined as a museum space to showcase much of the Vitra Design Museum's collection, totaling over 7,000 pieces, while the latter building, designed by Frank Gehry, was used for temporary exhibitions. Designed by Swiss architecture firm Herzog & de Meuron, the building is made of bricks, with a gabled roof, and bears an industrial appearance kept from the old factory building before, with expansive interiors for both permanent and temporary setups.

The museum opened on June 3, 2016 and displayed a permanent exhibition of over 400 pieces of modern furniture while also hosting a temporary exhibition dedicated to "radical design" from the sixties and seventies led by Italian designers. Many of the pieces, from the Vitra Design Museum's collection, had never been publicly accessible before then.

== Exhibitions ==
The Vitra Schaudepot's first temporary exhibition, in 2016, was Radical Design, a show dedicated to Italian designers from the avant-garde movement of the sixties and seventies such as Guido Rocco and Piero Gilardi. It was curated by Heng Zhi.

From 2016–2017, the Vitra Schaudepot displayed Dieter Rams: Modular World, an exhibition on the furniture and appliances of Dieter Rams, also curated by Zhi.

In 2017, the works of Ettore Sottsass were displayed in the exhibition, Ettore Sottsass–Rebel and Poet, which included furniture, products, photographs, and documents from the Italian designer.

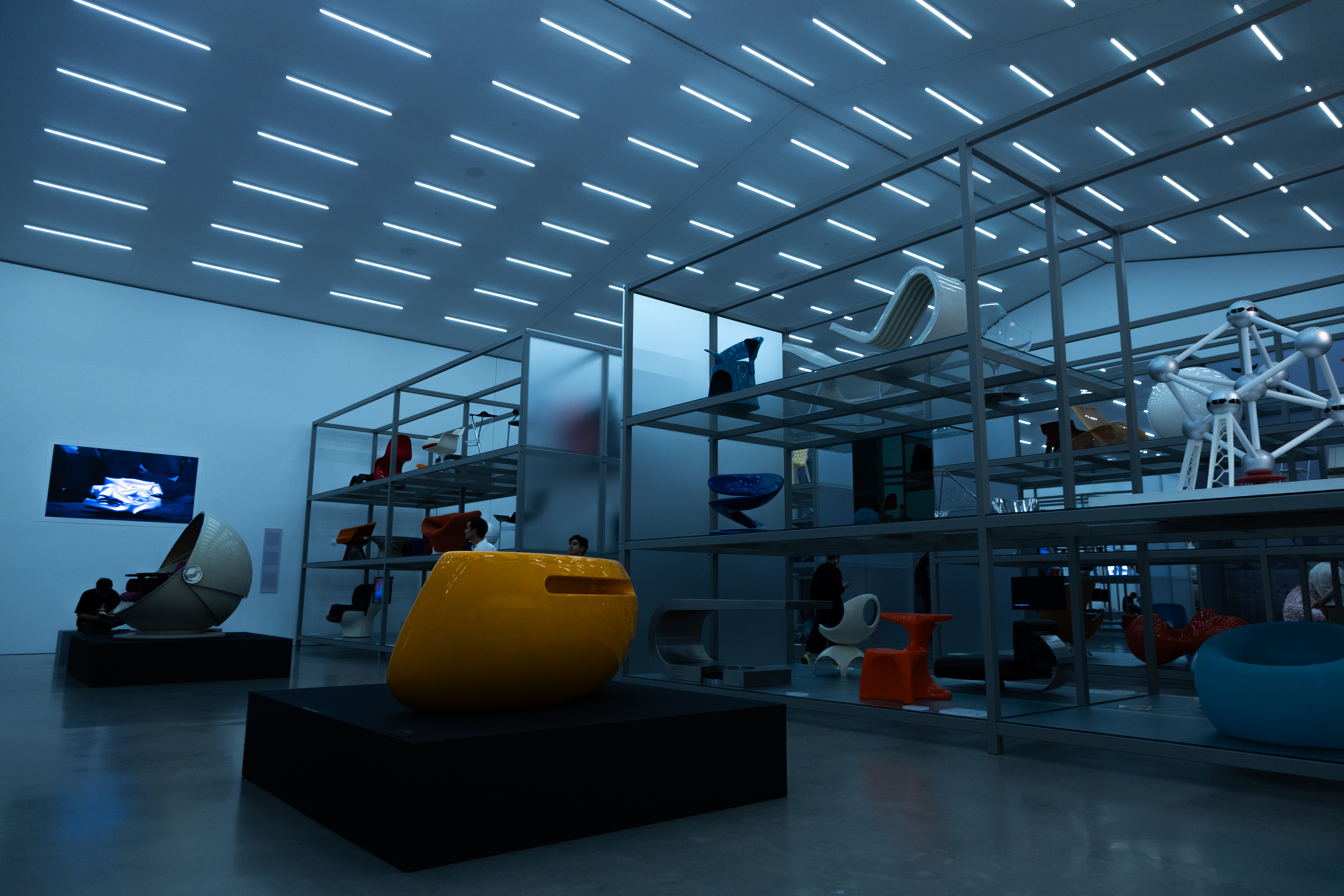
Inside of Vitra Schaudepot during the Science Fiction Design exhibition in 2025.

From May 2022 to May 2023, Dutch designer Sabine Marcelis reorganized the Vitra Design Museum's archive entirely by color for an exhibition titled Color Rush. Each color was placed on its own translucent shelving in order to produce strong contrasts between one another.

In 2024, the Vitra Schaudepot debuted a temporary exhibition showcasing sci-fi design, titled Science Fiction Design: From Space Age to Metaverse. It ran until May 11, 2025.
