= Diogene (house) =

Small house on the Vitra Campus

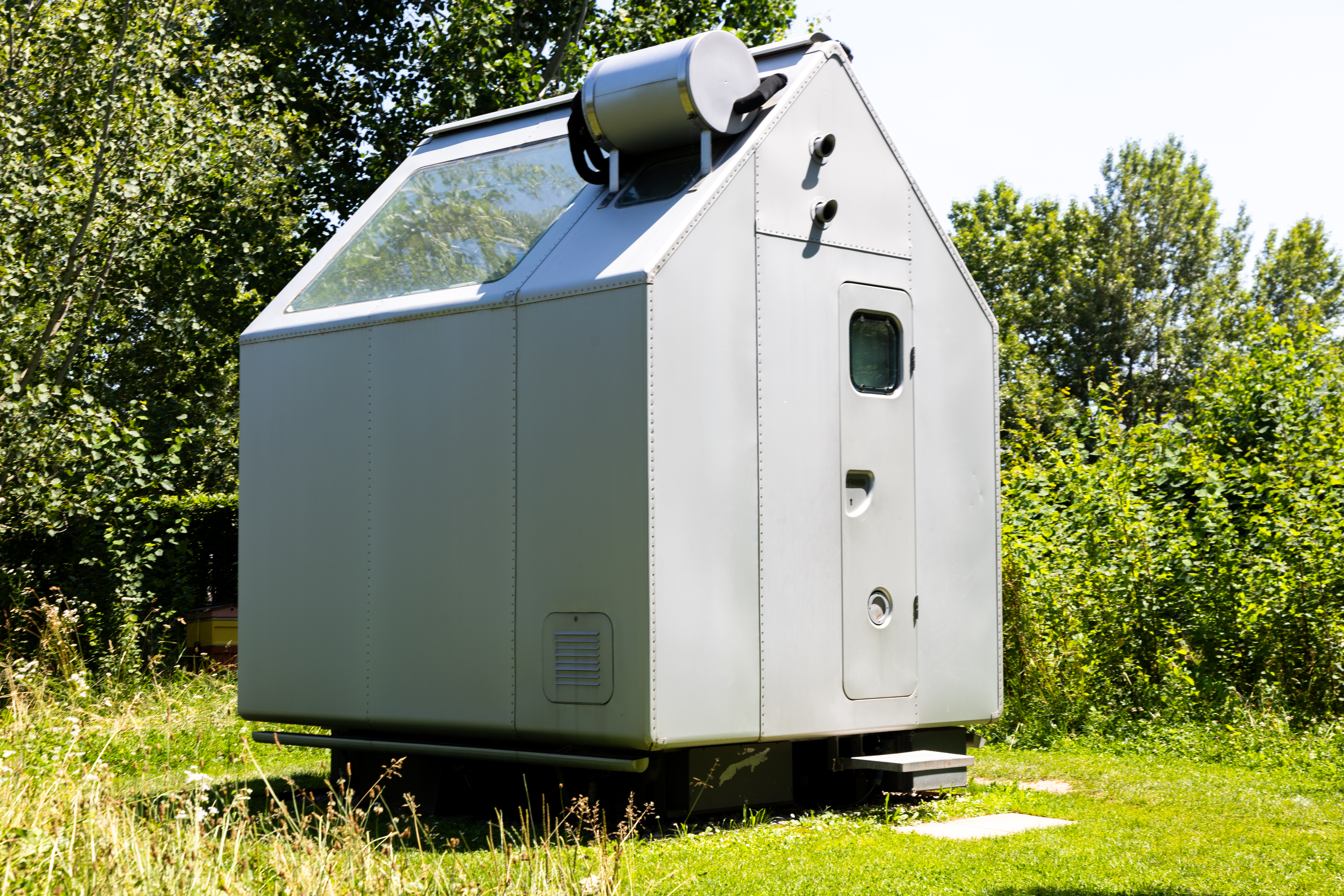
- Diogene in 2025

General information
- Location: Weil am Rhein, Germany
- Year built: 2010–2013
- Opened: June 2013
- Owner: Vitra

Height
- Height: 2.3 meters

Dimensions
- Weight: 1.2 tonnes

Technical details
- Floor area: 7.5 square meters

Design and construction
- Architect: Renzo Piano

Diogene is a small house designed by Renzo Piano, and his office, Renzo Piano Building Workshop, which sits on the Vitra Campus in Weil am Rhein, Germany. With a two meter by two meter interior, it is considered the smallest building on-site and represents a minimalist yet sustainable living space for one person. Imagined for a decade, with three years taken for its creation, Diogene was unveiled in June 2013 to coincide with that year's iteration of Art Basel. 3.Ka

== Design ==
For much of his career, Piano has been interested in miniature, minimalist abodes, featuring them prominently among his designs as well as building them with his students. In the 2000s, he began prototyping Diogene in Genoa before publishing a final design in Abitare in 2009, after which he found a client in Vitra chairman Rolf Fehlbaum; the two of them had served on the 2010 jury of the Pritzker Architecture Prize together. The two then began collaborating and presented the Diogene prototype at several iterations of Art Basel while working on the realization of Diogene for the Vitra Campus.

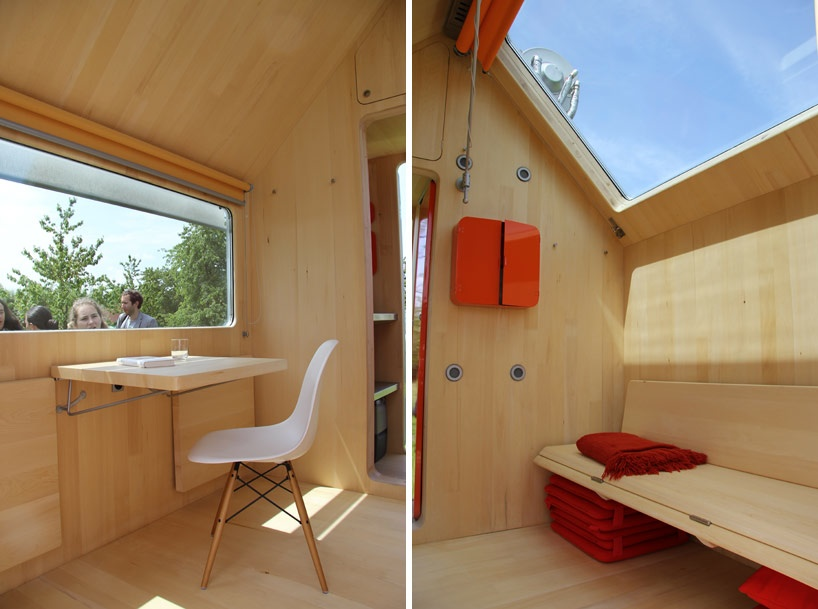
Interior of Diogene.

Made of a wood interior clad in an aluminum exterior, Diogene was prefabricated in Italy and then moved to the Vitra Campus in June 2013. Placed between the VitraHaus and Buckminster Fuller's dome, it features a solar panel system on its roof, a rainwater collection system, and, inside, hosts compact, foldable spaces for sleeping and working, as well as storage, and a bathroom. Its design theoretically enables it to be easily and conveniently moved and set up anywhere, as it only weighs a little over a ton. The entire process, of designing, prefabricating, and installing, took three years and was chronicled in an accompanying exhibition on the Vitra Campus.

Some have drawn parallels between Diogene and previous attempts at a small house, such as Le Corbusier's Cote d'Azur cabanon, the Refuge Tonneau designed by Charlotte Perriand and Pierre Jeanneret, Cedric Price's Fun Palace, and the works of Jean Prouvé. Vitra considers it to be a "voluntary place of retreat" rather than an emergency accommodation. While currently shown on the Vitra Campus as a prototype, Fehlbaum has ambitions of turning it into a viable product for consumers looking for a small house.

== Name ==
The small house's name is a reference to the Greek cynic philosopher Diogenes who, in repudiation of material and worldly desire, chose to live in a barrel.
