= Barragán Archive =

Archive on the Vitra Campus

The Barragán Archive is an archive inside the Vitra Schaudepot of the Vitra Campus in Weil am Rhein, Germany. Containing materials relevant to the Mexican architect Luis Barragán, it was opened in 2022, in collaboration with the Barragán Foundation, after having been acquired by Vitra in the nineties.

== History ==
After Barragán's death, many materials pertinent to his life and career moved hands between several institutions before being put up for sale by the Max Protetch gallery in New York City in 1994. The collection was acquired by Vitra chairman Rolf Fehlbaum and architectural scholar Federica Zanco, after which it was stored in the Vitra headquarters. Zanco then established the Barragán Foundation in 1996, based in Birsfelden, Switzerland, "with the aim of preventing the dispersion of the architect's professional legacy."

In 2000, the Barragán Foundation, in collaboration with the Vitra Design Museum, debuted an exhibition, titled Luis Barragán, the Quiet Revolution, in Weil am Rhein which then subsequently traveled across the world, concluding at the Palacio de Bellas Artes in Mexico City.

Decades later, in May 2022, the Barragán Foundation collaborated with the Vitra Design Museum again to relocate and make publicly accessible some of Barragán's work on the Vitra Campus. New facilities, designed by Dieter Thiel, were made for the archive, which "includes a state-of-the-art repository for the documents, a study room for visiting researchers, and the Barragán Gallery, a thematic exhibition space."

The Barragán Gallery, located in the Vitra Schaudepot, was curated by Martin Josephy and Luis E. Carranza to show "drawings, photographs and other material from the Barragán Archive, together with biographical details and an illustrated chronology of modern architecture in Mexico."

== Controversy ==
Many in Mexico have questioned the decision to archive Barragán's work far away from Mexico and instead in Vitra's headquarters in Germany, claiming that such a relocation "has hindered study of this Pritzker Prize-winning architect where his work is inextricably rooted" and that Zanco was "keeping his legacy too much to herself." Others have also stated the difficulty of accessing the Barragán materials, with many "architects, students, historians, and museum staff members" having been denied access. Toward these claims, Zanco defended herself as the "savior" of Barragán's works who kept it from being "sold piecemeal" and scattered across numerous institutions.

In the 2010s, Jill Magid, a Brooklyn artist interested in the works of Barragán, requested to visit the Barragán Foundation's archives and potentially make use of its materials, but her requests were denied. Magid claimed that nothing could be done with Barragán's works without prior authorization by the foundation, thus requiring both legal permission as well as monetary payment. When Magid displayed Barragán books, as well as a blown-up photograph of a miniature Barragán chair, in her exhibition at Art in General, Zanco warned her about "copyright implications." However, Magid and Zanco's relationship improved thereafter.
