= Fehlbaum =

Fehlbaum is a common Swiss family name, literally meaning "missing" or "faulty" (Fehl-) + tree (Baum). Notable people with the surname include:

- Rolf Fehlbaum (born 1941), chairman of Swiss furniture company Vitra
- Tim Fehlbaum (born 1982), Swiss film director
