= Vitra Fire Station =

First construction by architect Zaha Hadid, in Weil am Rhein, Germany

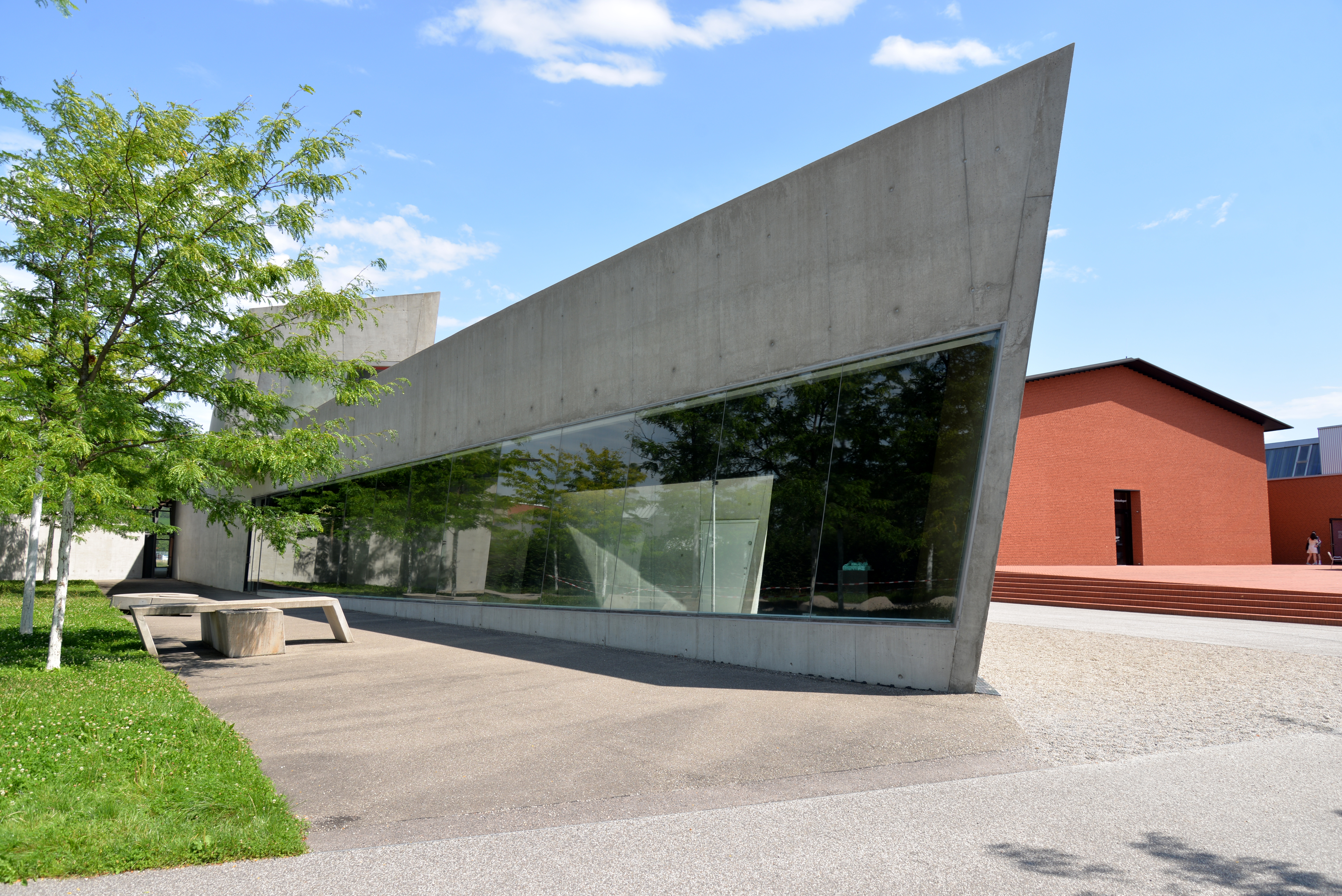

General information
- Location: Weil am Rhein, Germany
- Coordinates: 47°36′01.31″N 007°36′52.84″E
- Completed: 1993
- Owner: Vitra (furniture)

Technical details
- Material: Concrete and steel
- Size: 852 m^{2} (9,170 sq ft)

Design and construction
- Architect(s): Zaha Hadid

The Vitra Fire Station is a concrete and steel building of 852 m^{2} (9,170 sq ft) located at the Vitra Furniture factory in Weil am Rhein, Germany. Completed in 1993, it was the first constructed project by Iraqi architect Zaha Hadid.

== Construction ==
The roof and walls are constructed of exposed, reinforced in-situ cast concrete. The geometric design and forced perspectives give the sense of movement and momentum. Its construction began in 1991 and ended in 1993. The exterior of the building consists of sharply angled planar surfaces. The architecture of the building has been likened to Deconstructivism. The building was constructed as a self-contained fire station for the furniture factory after a fire destroyed parts of the factory in 1981.

== Design ==
Architect Nicholas Grimshaw was hired to redesign of the damaged factory complex. His original proposal was a unified series of buildings. However, the company later chose to create a collection of buildings with varying styles. For the fire station, the company hired Zaha Hadid, whom it had been considering for the design of some of its furniture product line.

== History ==
In 1981, a lightning strike caused a fire at the Vitra Furniture factory in Weil am Rhein, Germany. Business interruption insurance covered the loss from the factory shut down due to the damage from the fire. Architect Nicholas Grimshaw was given the project of rebuilding the factory. In an interview, Vitra director Rolf Fehlbaum described his decision to work with him as influenced by Grimshaw's approach of being similar to product design, comparing him to Charles and Ray Eames. After six months the company was back in production.

Fehlbaum was interested in architect Zaha Hadid designing furniture for Vitra. After the fire, the company created its own fire brigade and housed it in a makeshift structure. Hadid had a variety of drawings for projects that the company considered very dynamic. The company felt having its own fire brigade was also dynamic and assigned Hadid the project for the building. It was the first building complex designed by Zaha Hadid. Starting with the fire station, she also designed the campus boundary walls, an exercise facility, and a bicycle shed. She noted: "There was no landscape, so we had to invent one. It was an un-place we had to make into a place."

The fire station was risk management for a furniture factory that created furniture from designers Charles and Ray Eames, George Nelson, and Verner Panton. As mentioned above about the interview with Rolf Fehlbaum, there was an interest in the style of product design, like that of Charles and Ray Eames. To economically accomplish the project, Hadid used just a few poured-in-place concrete slabs for the connections to the planar structure.

Danish architect Bjarke Ingels described Hadid's work with the building:

She had somehow found a way to manifest in physical form the seemingly impossible perspectives of floating elements and skewed angles that she had captured in her fantasy [paintings].

=== Present use ===
There were reports that the firefighters allegedly found the building difficult to use for its purpose of a fire station. A few years later, the corporation disbanded its fire brigade and used the building for events and for exhibitions held by the Vitra Design Museum, which was designed by fellow deconstructivism proponent Frank Gehry.

== Gallery ==
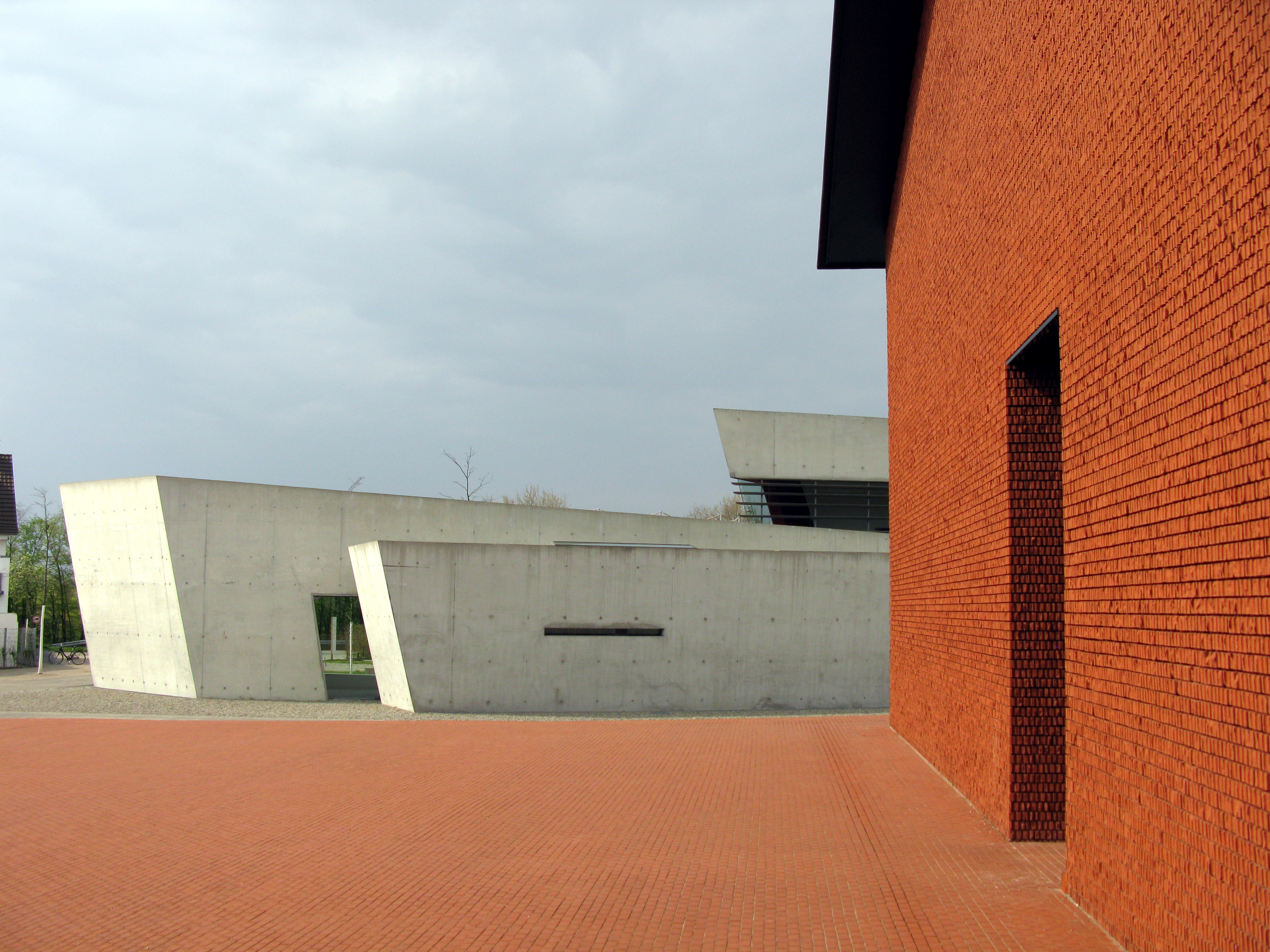

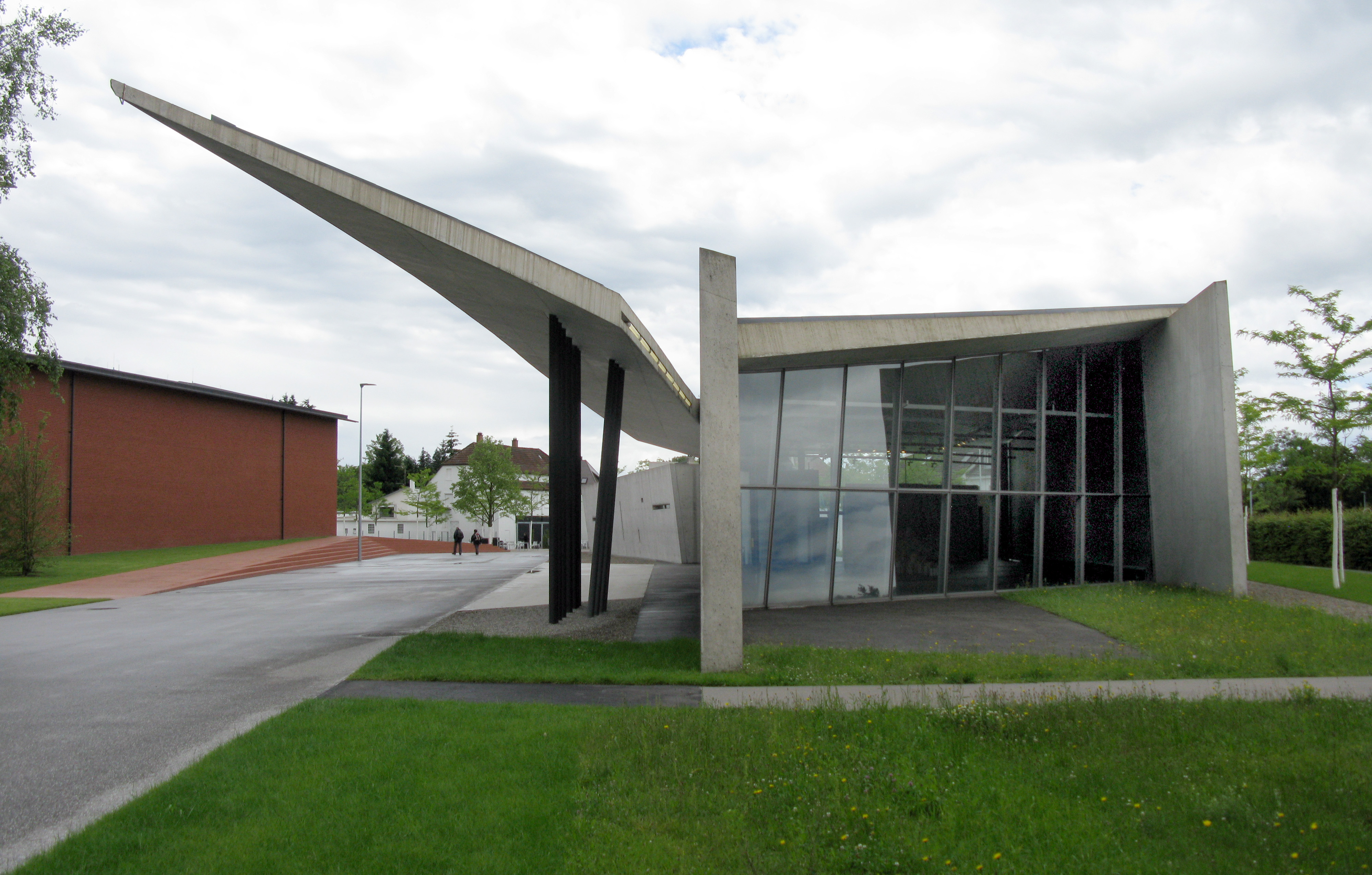

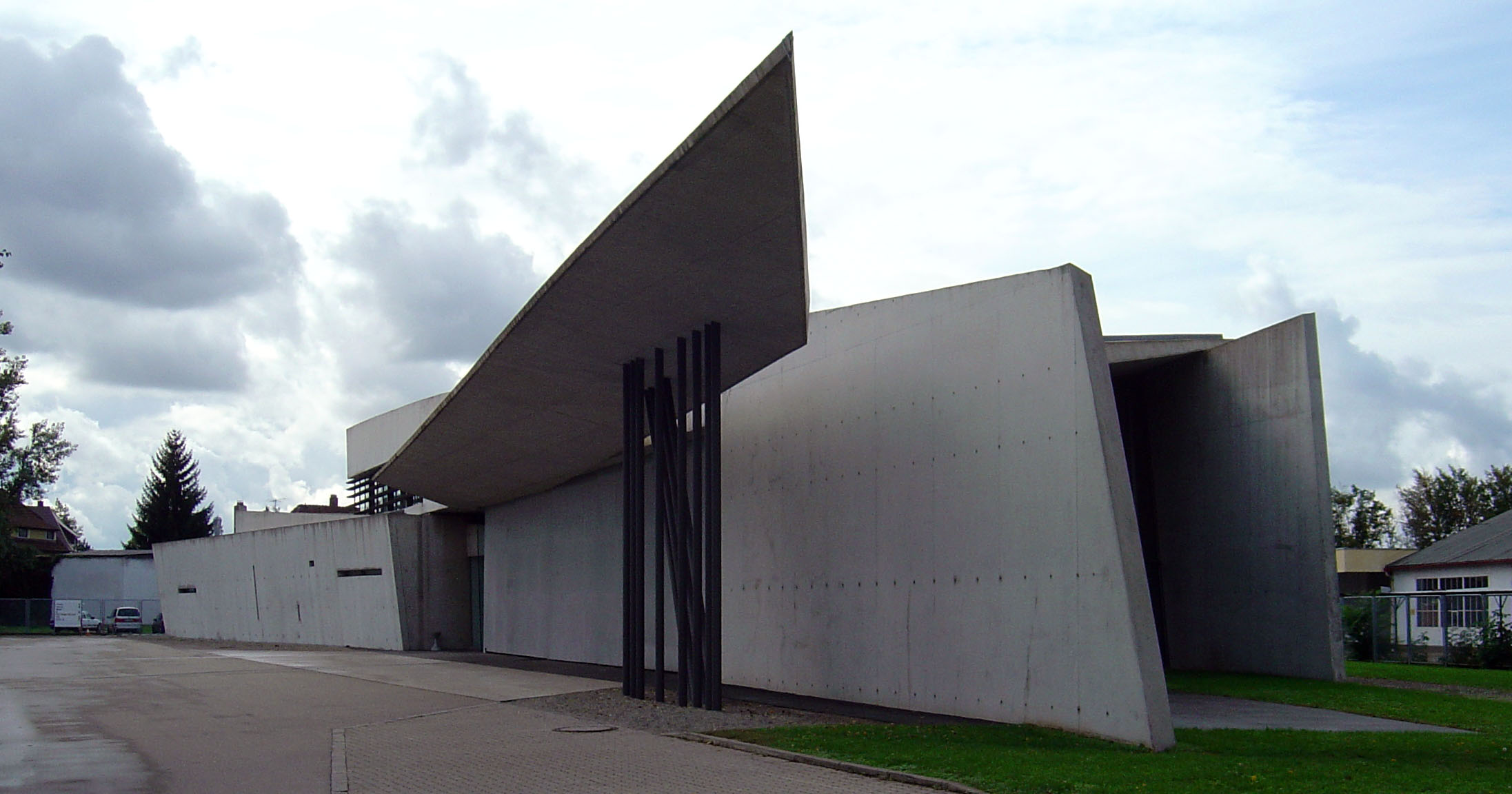
Vitra company fire station by Zaha Hadid, Weil am Rhein, Germany.

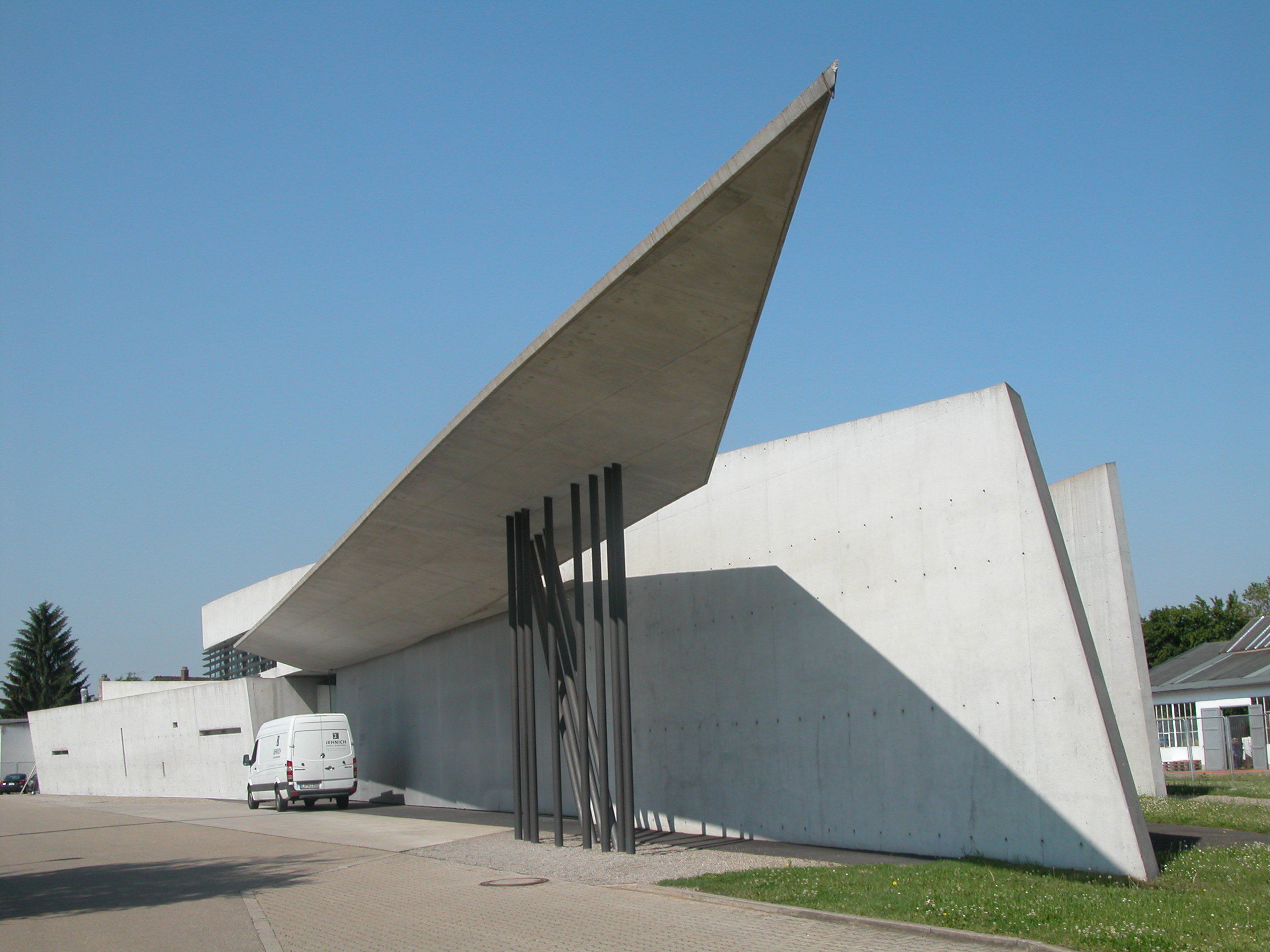
Sharply angled planar surfaces are reminiscent of a bird in flight.

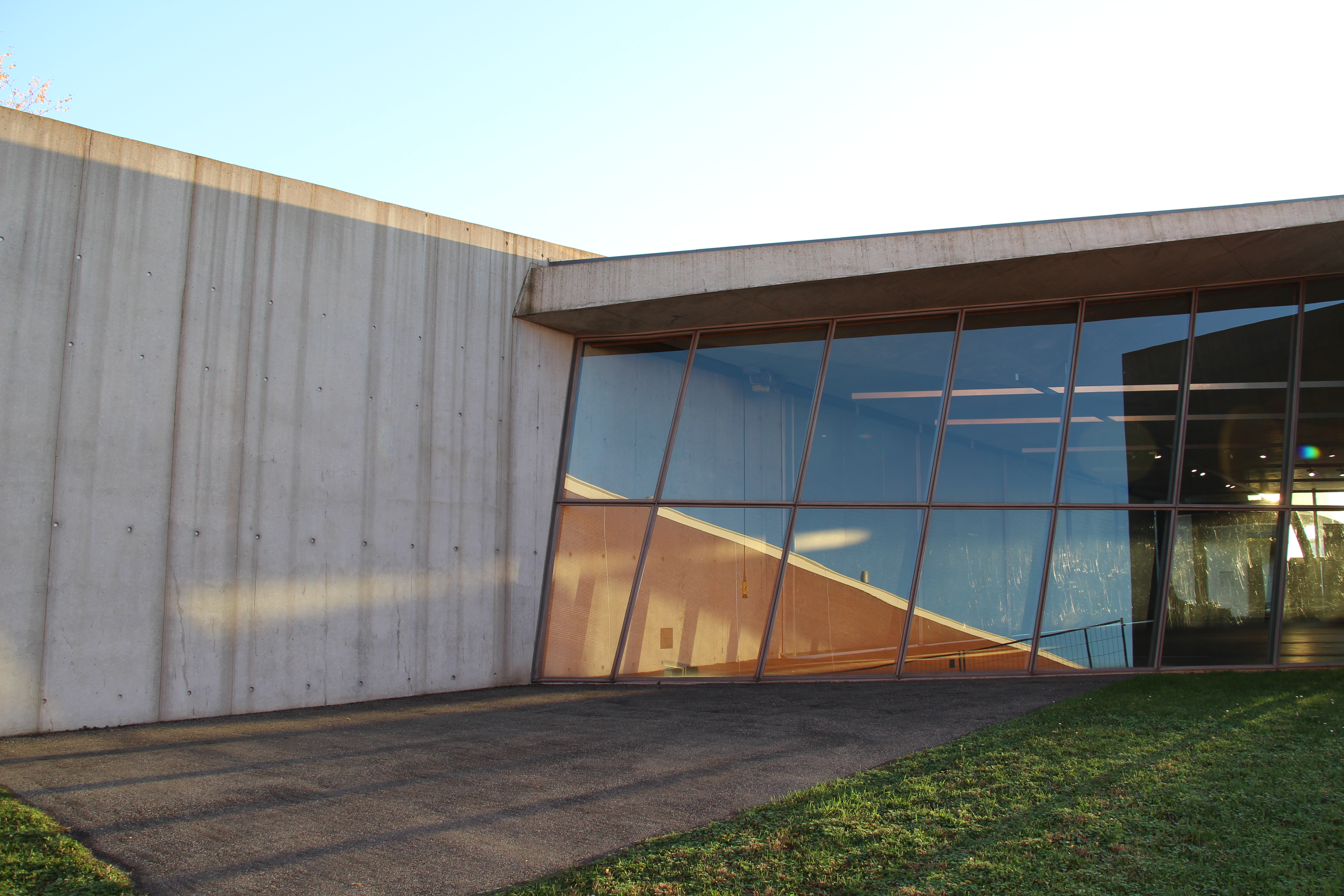
A view of the art gallery space behind the window. The reflection of other buildings in the Vitra Fire Station give a small sense of the other Vitra campus buildings.

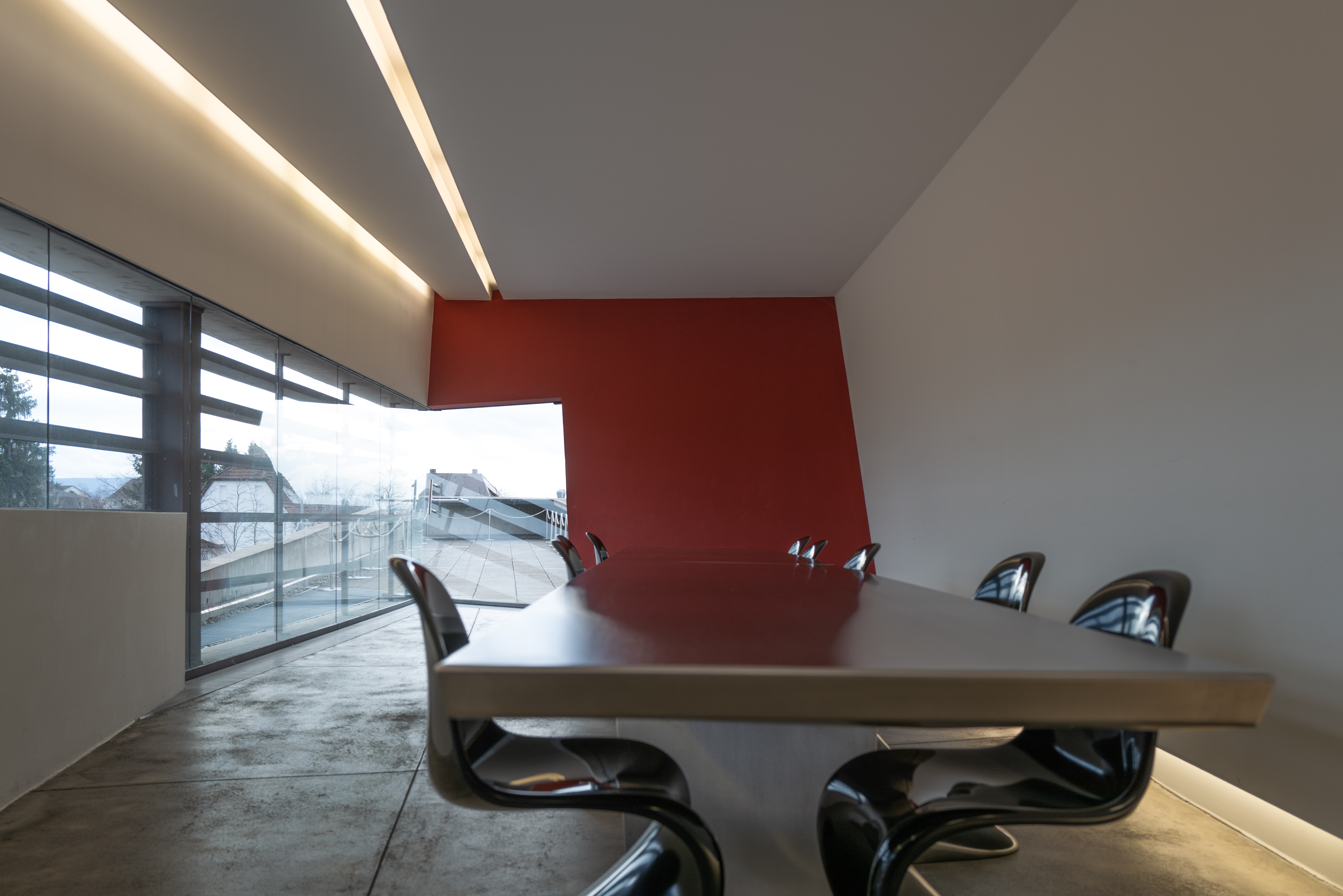
Vitra Fire Station conference room
