= VitraHaus =

Building on the Vitra Campus

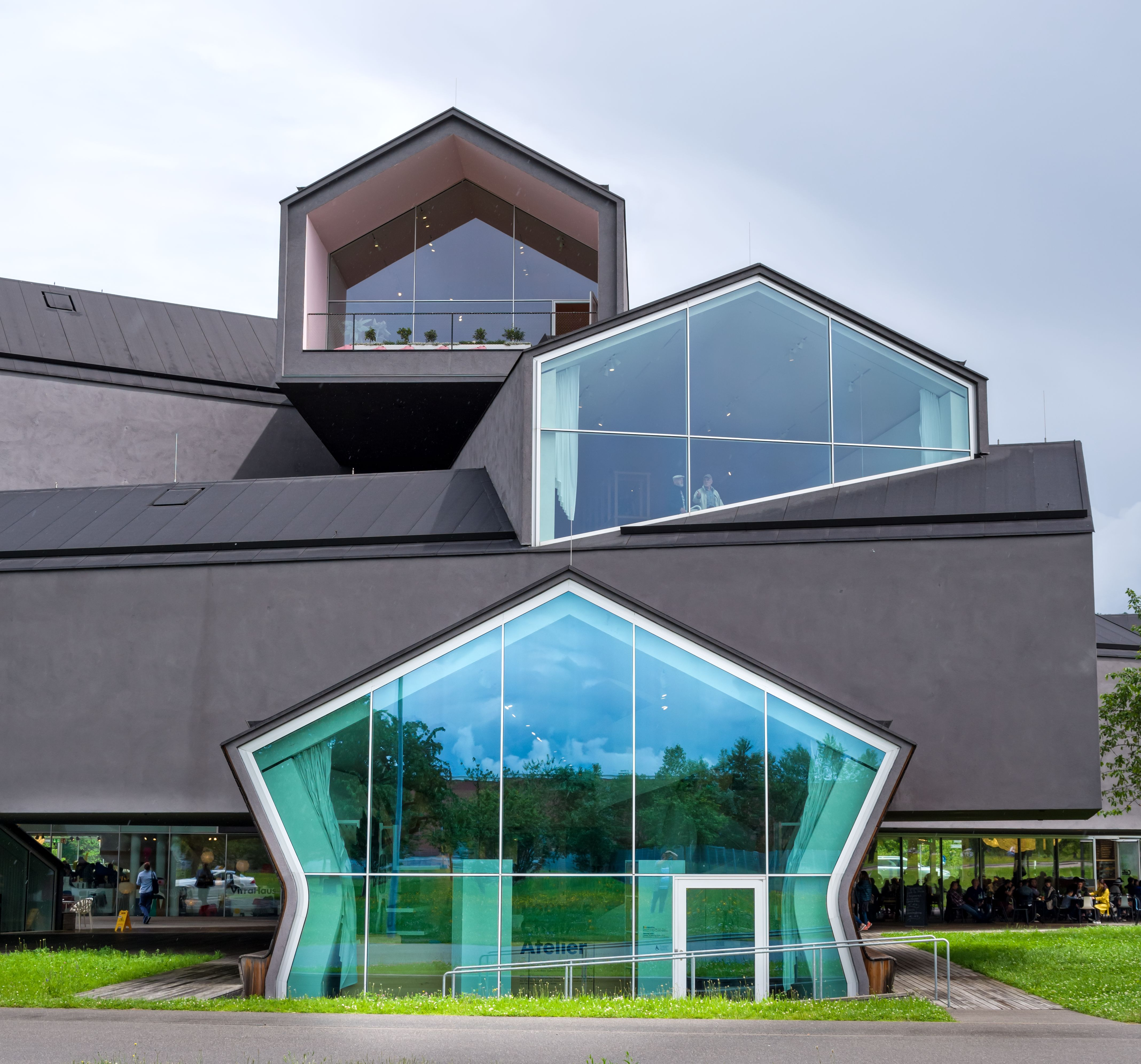
- Interactive map of the VitraHaus area

General information
- Location: Ray, Charles-Eames-Straße 1, Weil am Rhein, Germany
- Coordinates: 47.6030304651729°N 7.617887427640543°E
- Year built: 2006–2009
- Opened: February 2010
- Owner: Vitra

Design and construction
- Architect: Herzog & de Meuron

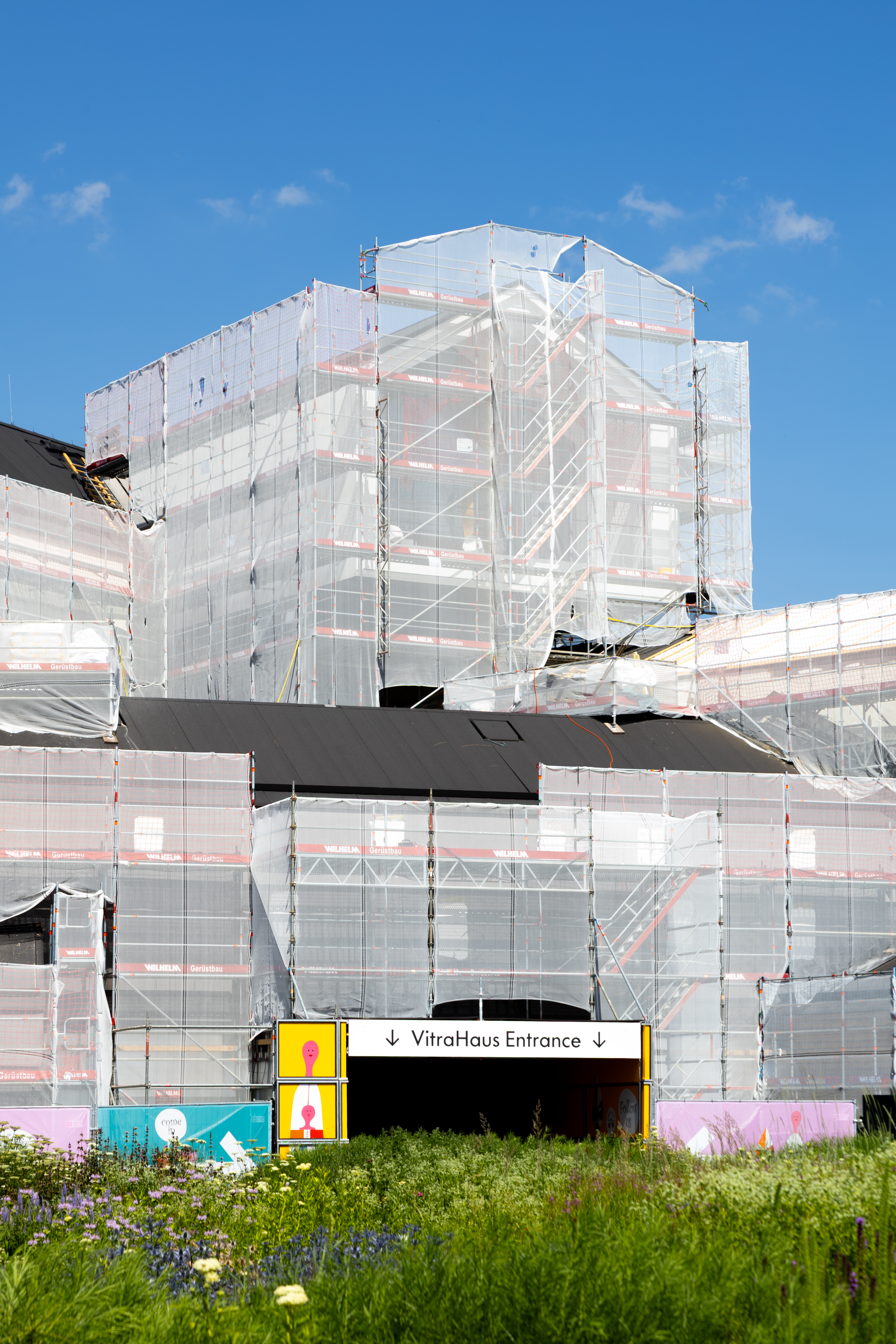
VitraHaus (pictured in June 2025)

VitraHaus is a building on the Vitra Campus in Weil am Rhein, Germany. Designed by Herzog & de Meuron, it was commissioned by Vitra in 2006 and unveiled in 2010 as a dedicated space, flagship store, and café for Vitra's Home Collection product line. Since then, it has become a popular venue on the Vitra Campus and draws in around 350,000 visitors a year.

== History ==
Imagined as numerous pitched-roof buildings stacked atop one another, the building was designed by Herzog & de Meuron, which specifically wanted to create "the archetypal house" in conjunction with the sensibility of stacking for numerous functions: to reduce its footprint, to provide an overview of the Vitra Complex, and to create a "secret world" of surprises inside. Jacques Herzog called it "a paradoxical building... a sequence of extremely complex spaces." All in all, the building has twelve houses, with five forming its base.

Vitra had commissioned the architects in 2006 to create the VitraHaus in order to create a space to present and showcase Vitra's 2004 Home Collection line. With completion planned for 2009, it was unveiled in February 2010 and marked what some considered to be the famous Swiss architects' long-awaited contribution to the Vitra Complex. It was the third building to join the Vitra Campus, preceded by the Vitra Design Museum, designed by Frank Gehry, of 1989 and the Conference Pavilion, designed by Tadao Ando, in 1993.

In 2020, for its tenth anniversary, VitraHaus provided a virtual tour of its space which included glimpses at a mural by Oscar Grønner and a furnishing of the loft by Charlap Hyman & Herrero "fit for a film director."

== Exhibitions ==
In its five stories, VitraHaus has hosted numerous showcases by contemporary designers. It generally displays pieces of furniture by designers like Charles and Ray Eames, Maarten van Severen, Isamu Noguchi, among others.

In 2011, coinciding with Art Basel, New York City-based textile company Maharam installed seven of its "digitally-printed wallpaper patterns" into the walls of VitraHaus.

In 2014, Studioilse reimagined the VitraHaus loft for a fictitious Finnish-German couple, Harri and Astrid, a musician and set designer, respectively. Studioilse wanted to fill the space with objects characteristic of their lives and vocations, with a "lived-in" feeling away from mere "commercialization."

In 2018, London-based studio Raw Edges curated a series of Vitra Home Collection and Artek products in order to "achieve a cheerful, authentic and true to life environment" characteristic of Raw Edges' "light-hearted approach and playful use of materials, colors and products." The two Israeli designers had wanted to come up with a comfortable, functional space that they, themselves, would want to live in with their children.

In 2020, Charlap Hyman & Herrero designed a space fit for a fictional film director living in isolation during the COVID-19 pandemic. It showcased both American and international sensibilities with a sense of outdoors.

In 2022, Ilse Crawford, of Studioilse, curated an exhibit for the VitraHaus loft to showcase Artek, which Vitra had recently acquired, and "to portray the collections as they are in life, not as artworks behind glass."

In the same year, British designer Jasper Morrison imagined a space for a fictional abstract artist, Allard Pierson, who no longer exhibits his work due to a lack of public interest in abstract art. The resulting space bore "Understated, utilitarian designs" in a space that was half home, half studio.

Additionally, in 2022, designer Sabine Marcelis curated a color-based exhibit, called "Colour Rush," which sought to divide a "large open space" into "functional zones, delineated by color" for the Vitra Complex's Schaudepot building. Later, in 2024, Marcelis collaborated with the VitraHaus to reimagine its loft furnished by VitraHaus' Home Collection and, once again, defined by Marcelis' color choices. There, she unveiled a new burgundy lava lamp designed in collaboration with Mathmos.

In 2024–2025, Swiss interior stylist Connie Hüsser curated an exhibition of birdhouses, called "Home Sweet Home," designed by forty contemporary designers, both emerging and established, across the design industry. Designers included Akiko Mori, Forréol Babin, Jochen Holz, Michela Castagnaro, Jenna Kaës, and many others.

== Collaborations ==
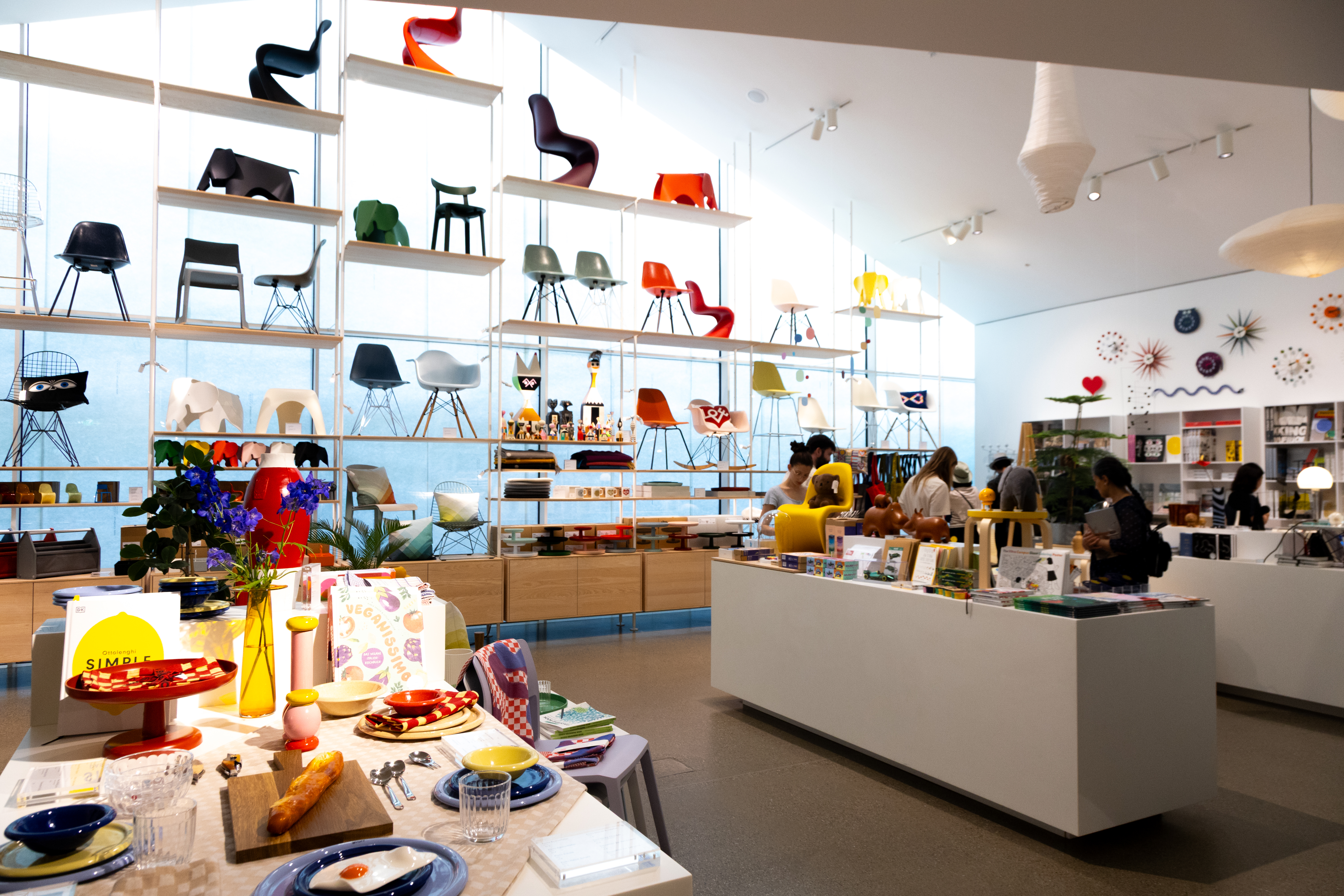
Store inside the VitraHaus.

In 2024, VitraHaus collaborated with Soeder, a skincare company in Zurich, on a liquid soap called "Ever Green" with both handwashing and bath purposes. The product idea had come to life after Vitra creative director Till Weber and Soeder founders Hanna and Johan Olzon Åkerström took walks in the Oudolf Garten, or Vitra Campus garden.
