= Jill Magid =

American conceptual artist, writer, and filmmaker

- Born: 1973 (age 52–53); Bridgeport, Connecticut, U.S.
- Education: Cornell University Massachusetts Institute of Technology
- Occupations: Artist, Writer, and filmmaker

Jill Magid (born 1973) is an American conceptual artist, writer, and filmmaker. Magid’s performance-based practice "interrogates structures of power on an intimate level, exploring the emotional, philosophical, and legal tensions that exist between institutions and individual agency.”

Magid has frequently worked by forming personal relationships with governmental systems of power, including police and intelligence agencies, questioning these structures of authority on a human level by embedding herself within them. Other projects intervene at contested sites of corporate control, bureaucratic process, and the law.

== Life ==
Magid was born in Bridgeport, Connecticut in 1973. She graduated with a Bachelor of Fine Arts from Cornell University in Ithaca, New York, and received an MS in Visual Studies from the Massachusetts Institute of Technology. She currently lives and works in New York with her husband Jonny Bauer and their two sons. She serves as an adjunct professor at The Cooper Union.

== Exhibitions ==
Magid's work has been the subject of solo exhibitions at numerous institutions, including Tate Modern, London (2009); Museo Universitario Arte Contemporáneo, Mexico City (2017); Whitney Museum of American Art, New York (2010); San Francisco Art Institute (2016); Berkeley Museum of Art, California (2011); Tate Liverpool (2009); the Stedelijk Museum Bureau Amsterdam (2005); Yvon Lambert, Paris and New York (2009); Gagosian Gallery, New York (2007); the Centre D'arte Santa Monica, Barcelona (2007); Stroom Den Haag, The Netherlands (2008); the Modern Art Museum of Fort Worth (2022), and the M-Museum, Leuven, Belgium (2023).

Magid is represented by LABOR, Mexico City.

== Awards and residencies ==
Magid is an Associate of the Art, Design and the Public Domain program at the Graduate School of Design at Harvard University, and was a 2013–15 fellow at the Vera List Center for Art and Politics. Previously, Magid was an artist-in-residence at the Rijksakademie van Beeldende Kunsten, Amsterdam from 2000–2. She has received various awards, including the Calder Prize 2017, the Basis Stipendium from Fonds Voor Beeldende Kunsten in the Netherlands in 2006 and a Netherland-American Foundation Fellowship Fulbright Grant from 2001–2002.

She is also the author of four books, and her project The Barragán Archives is the subject of the book The Proposal, published by Sternberg Press.

== Selected works ==
=== Evidence Locker ===
Evidence Locker was a 2004 collaboration with Liverpool's City Watch (Merseyside Police and Liverpool City Council) – then England's largest citywide video surveillance system. Wearing a red trench coat for thirty-one days, Magid periodically contacted on-duty police to train their public cameras on her. Sometimes, the surveillants located her on their own.

City Watch stores CCTV footage for only thirty-one days "unless requested as evidence"; requested footage, in turn, is kept for seven years in a digital "Evidence Locker" on the organization's main computer. Despite her collaboration with the organization, Magid could only obtain access to her footage by formally submitting thirty-one Subject Access Request Forms, detailing the time and nature of the evidentiary incidents. Building upon her implicit intimacy with the CCTV observers, Magid filled out these legal documents as if writing letters to a lover. The collected letters form her 2004 book, One Cycle of Memory in the City of L.

After filing the forms, Magid received over eleven hours of CCTV recordings, constituting her own personal evidence locker. The artist edited this footage into a number of videos, including Final Tour (2004), which comprises a series of time-lapse sequences of the artist motorcycling through the city at sunset, backed by Georges Delerue's score from Le Mépris. In Trust (2004), a CCTV operator communicates with Magid via mobile phone, guiding the artist – eyes closed – through the city's public spaces.

As a whole, Evidence Locker contributes to contemporary debates around public surveillance by giving a nuanced, focused take on the "emotional and philosophical relationship between ‘protective' institutions […] and individual identity."

=== The Spy Project ===
In 2005, Magid was commissioned by the Dutch secret service (AIVD) to make a work for its new headquarters, as per the law's stipulation that "a portion of the budget for the new building be spent on an art commission." The organization solicited the artist to help improve its public persona by providing "‘the AIVD with a human face.'"

Magid spent the following three years meeting with eighteen willing employees in non-descript public places, from restaurants and bars to airport meeting points. AIVD restricted the artist from using recording equipment, so she collected her contacts' personal data in handwritten notes, which informed her later series of neons, sculptures and paper works. Magid also drafted a report of her meetings, amassing the details of individual contacts into a collective persona that she referred to as "The Organization."

The first exhibition of the project, Article 12, opened at "Stroom" Den Haag, The Netherlands in April 2008 – the same month AIVD took residence in its new headquarters. The show also marked the official end of the artist's commission. Named after the article that protects personal data, Article 12 never entirely disclosed the identities of Magid's contacts, but nonetheless inverted "the surveillance duties of the agency" by publicly displaying materials associated with its employees.

Magid invited AIVD personnel to review the exhibition a day before the opening; the agents returned, during its run, to confiscate several works. A draft of Magid's report, in turn, was delivered to the artist with redactions of "any information that might compromise her sources' identities," as well as "some of the artist's descriptions of her own thoughts and feelings."

The artist "protested against the censorship of her own memories," prompting AIVD to suggest that she "‘present the manuscript as a visual work of art in a one-time-only exhibition, after which it would become the property of the Dutch government and not be published.'" Magid's 2009/10 exhibition at Tate Modern, Authority to Remove, marked the fulfillment of this request: the uncensored report sat securely behind glass. In its penultimate state, the project thus expressed "what it means to have a secret but not the autonomy to share it."

AIVD entered Tate Modern, in 2010, to permanently confiscate Magid's uncensored manuscript. A paperback of the redacted version, Becoming Tarden, was published in 2010.

=== Failed States ===
On January 21, 2010, a man attempted to enter the Texas State Capitol to speak with a Senator's aide. Immediately upon exiting the building, he fired six shots into the sky. Magid, coincidentally, was on a trip to research the history of snipers in Austin; her eyewitness account of the shooting aired on several media outlets.

The motivations of the young shooter, Fausto Cardenas, remain unknown. He was charged with perpetrating a terrorist threat to the government, but the trial date for his case was continuously delayed. Fausto accepted a plea bargain, in August 2011, "ultimately silencing himself."

Magid responded strongly to "the symbolic gesture of six shots into the sky, the fateful setting, the silence that refuses to ground [Fausto] in political rhetoric or personal instability." For Closet Drama, her 2011 exhibition at the Berkeley Art Museum, and the subsequent Failed States, the artist drew thematic and formal connections between Fausto's act and Goethe's nineteenth-century poem, Faust. Acting "as eyewitness and dramaturge," Magid linked themes of tragedy and futility between Fausto and his nominal relative, even bringing texts of Faust's monologues into the gallery space as implicit stand-ins for the shooter's silence. Goethe's epic was originally written as a "closet drama," "a play to be read rather than performed". In Magid's hands, the gallery transformed into a "stage to be read," with language, sculpture, video and image creating an intertextual weave between stories and events, individuals and publics, actions and aftermaths.

The day of the shooting, Magid met with a reporter, "CT," who had previously embedded with the US military in Iraq and Afghanistan. Over a series of meetings, the artist decided to train to embed with CT on his next trip to Afghanistan. CT informed her that they would navigate the country in a "hard car" – usually a Mercedes – armored to withstand gunfire while blending into traffic. Magid promptly decided to armor her 1993 Mercedes station wagon and, as part of her 2012 exhibition at AMOA-Arthouse, Austin, parked the car in the spot where Fausto had parked on the day he fired his six shots.

=== Auto Portrait Pending ===
In 2005, Magid signed a contract with Lifegem, a company that specializes in turning cremated bodies into diamonds. The artist specified that, upon her death, 8 ounces of carbon from her remains will be transformed into a one-carat, round-cut diamond estimated to cost about $20,000, to be set in a gold ring.

Auto Portrait Pending is exhibited as an incomplete form of Magid's self-portrait. A contract containing three sections (a corporate contract, artist's preamble and a private beneficiary contract), a ring box and the unset gold ring make up its existing parts. The beneficiary contract allows for ownership of "the artist (in symbolic terms) until her death, after which her ashes will be transformed into a jewel to be put in the ring on permanent display." At the beginning of the beneficiary contract it is stated that the funeral and artwork are to be completely separate. The beneficiary who is unknown at this time must be a collector or institution with a substantial collection where the piece will remain in permanent display. In her own words, "The beneficiary is usually the loved one. The husbands gets the wife, the wife the husband, etcetera. I specify the beneficiary as a collector."

"Representation is exchanged for reality. It is a kind of Faustian pact (a recurring motif for the artist, in fact) with Magid bartering for eternal existence in the form of a carefully curated gemstone commodity, offering her own body as an artwork in the making, and in so doing tying herself in very strange relationship with an unknown Beneficiary: technically she becomes their property-to-be."

=== The Barragán Archives ===
From 2013 through 2016, Magid explored the contested legacy of the late Mexican architect Luis Barragán. While Barragán's personal archive and the vast majority of his architecture are located in Mexico, his professional archive is owned by the Swiss corporation Vitra, under the auspices of the not-for-profit Barragan Foundation. The foundation firmly controls the rights to Barragán's name and work, and has kept the archive closed to the public. Magid’s project asks “what can happen to an artist’s legacy when a corporation owns and controls the rights to his work.” Through a series of objects, installations, performances, and a feature film, it explores the "intersection of the psychological with the judicial, national identity and repatriation, international property rights and copyright law, authorship and ownership."

The project has been the subject of a number of exhibitions. These include “Women with Sombrero” at Art In General, New York (2013) and Yvon Lambert, Paris (2014), “The Proposal” at Kunst Halle Sankt Gallen, Switzerland and the San Francisco Art Institute (both 2016), and “A Letter Always Arrives at its Destination: The Barragán Archives” at Museo Universitario Arte Contemporáneo, Mexico City (2017). The project was chronicled by Alice Gregory in a series of articles for the New Yorker in 2016 and 2017, and is the subject of Magid’s film, The Proposal.

=== The Proposal (Film, 2018) ===
Magid’s first feature film, The Proposal (83 min, 2018), was commissioned by Laura Poitras of Field of Vision, who also served as executive producer. The film explores Magid's relationship to Luis Barragán, and builds on her work stemming from his archive. The narrative starts with her in her studio in New York and then moves to Barragán's home, recreating aspects of his life, and delving deeper into his relationships, connections and personal moments from his life. The film unpacks a narrative exploring "...forms of power, public access, and copyright that construct artistic legacy", as Magid explores the split of Barragán's archive - a personal verse a professional one- upon his death. The professional archive (along with the rights to the Barragán name) was purchased by Rolf Fehlbaum, the chairman of Vitra a Swiss furniture company, as an engagement present for his at the time fiancée Federica Zanco "in lieu of a ring", as Magid repeats through the film. Since the purchase of the archive this portion has not been exhibited. Through the film, Magid examines the scenario, critically, and creates a situation centered around the idea of love; love of an artist, a human and marital love. She sets out to create an engagement ring from a small portion of Barragán's ashes and brings the ring to a meeting she arranges with Ms. Zanco, in exchange for the archive's return to Mexico she will give her the engagement ring. Magid proposes a portion of the man, for the archive. At the time of the film Zanco has not accepted her proposal, but Magid's offer still stands. The film premiered at the 2018 Tribeca Film Festival, receiving numerous awards. The film is distributed in the US and Canada by Oscilloscope Films, played in over thirty cities across the US after opening at New York’s IFC Center and Los Angeles’ Laemmle Monica Film Center, and in museum contexts including the Tate Modern and the Centre Pompidou. It was a New York Times critics’ pick, and was reviewed in The Washington Post, The Los Angeles Times, and the Boston Globe, among others.

== Books ==
One Cycle of Memory in the City of L (2004) comprises the thirty-one Subject Access Request Forms Magid filed to obtain access to CCTV footage from Evidence Locker, her 2004 collaboration with Liverpool's City Watch. These forms ask for the time and nature of the incidents in question, which Magid supplied along with expressions of affection for their implicit recipients. In the artist's work, an intimacy can form between a pedestrian and her surveillants, and a bureaucratic document can testify to that relationship.

Lincoln Ocean Victor Eddy (2007) emerged from a five-month period Magid spent shadowing a New York police officer during his nightly rounds through the city's subway system. The book forgoes the mediating structure of legal documents, as in One Cycle of Memory in the City of L, by providing a diaristic account of Magid's feelings towards her companion – a shift to character-driven writing that continues in the artist's later books, Becoming Tarden and Failed States.

Writing in The New York Times, critic Roberta Smith describes Magid's text as "quietly heart-rending novella, a kind of tunnel vision of two people moving along parallel tracks while the city hums around them. The relationship is never consummated, but ‘Lincoln Ocean Victor Eddy' spells love."

Part of The Spy Project, Becoming Tarden (2010) is a non-fiction novel that emerged from Magid's interviews with eighteen agents of the Dutch secret service (AIVD). Following Magid's submission of a draft, in 2008, the organization censored forty percent of the contents, from compromising information to the artist's personal descriptions and recollections. AIVD conceded to allow Magid to exhibit the uncensored report – only once – "‘as a visual work of art.'" Following its secure display in 2009/10 at the Tate Modern, the Dutch government assumed ownership of the manuscript.

In a letter to AIVD, Magid remarked: "‘The book, Becoming Tarden, is a memoir of our involvement. I had dreams of publishing it as my first novel. You are its only reader. Seize it. Strip it. Hold it in your building and seal it under glass. I comply.'"

A redacted paperback version of Becoming Tarden was published in 2010.

Failed States (2012) departs from the project of the same name, shifting focus to "CT," a former embedded war correspondent who helps train Magid to embed in Afghanistan. The artist formerly played the role of incidental witness to Fausto's shooting, but in the book, actively seeks out training with a "personal desire to engage the war on terror and its media representation through becoming an eyewitness."

This non-fiction novel marks a new stage in Magid's writing: unlike previous works, its contents never enter the gallery space. The topics of the Closet Drama and Failed States exhibitions, in turn, are barely mentioned in the book.

== Critical response ==
Magid's work "is incisive in its poetic questioning of the ethics of human behavior and the hidden political structures of society. Her intelligent conceptual strategies engage the viewer in an absorbing aesthetic and intellectual experience that turns conventional assumptions of power, secrecy, control and social space inside out."

"Ms. Magid […] seems motivated by an urge to infiltrate and personalize, if not sexualize, the anonymous social and technological systems that surround us. She pursues an idiosyncratic kind of body art descended from artists like Vito Acconci, Adrian Piper and Sophie Calle."
