= Conference Pavilion =

Building on the Vitra Campus

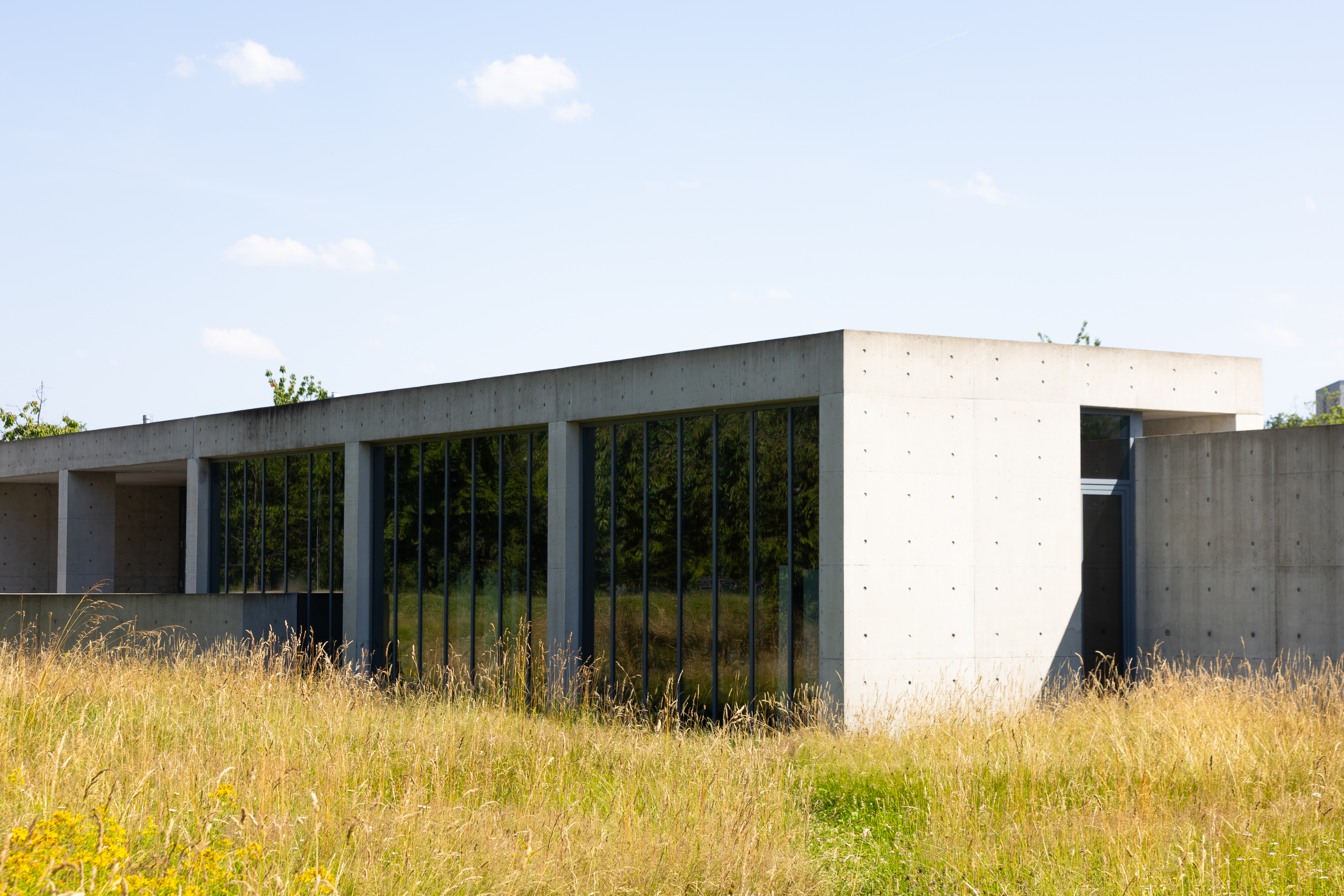
- The west side of the Conference Pavilion

General information
- Address: Charles-Eames-Straße 2
- Town or city: Weil am Rhein
- Country: Germany
- Coordinates: 47.60124216875852°N 7.620102654626361°E
- Completed: 1993
- Owner: Vitra

Design and construction
- Architect(s): Tadao Ando

The Conference Pavilion is a building on the Vitra Campus in Weil am Rhein, Germany. It was designed by Tadao Ando and built in 1993, marking the Japanese architect's first building outside of Japan.

== History ==
Designed by Ando, the building was completed in 1993 and provides a set of conference rooms within, as well as various paths outside "reminiscent of Japanese monasteries."

The Conference Pavilion was the first building Ando ever built outside of Japan. His characteristic minimalism, of gridded concrete and holes for light, defines the style of the building, which is surrounded by cherry trees.

== Film ==
In 2019, film studio 9sekunden released a short film based around the Conference Pavilion.
