= Vitra (furniture) =

Swiss furniture company

- Company type: Privately held company
- Founded: 1950
- Headquarters: Birsfelden (Basel-Landschaft), Switzerland
- Key people: Willi and Erika Fehlbaum, founder Rolf Fehlbaum, Chairman, Nora Fehlbaum, CEO
- Products: Design furniture
- Website: vitra.com

Vitra is a Swiss family-owned furniture company headquartered in Birsfelden, Switzerland. It manufactures the works of many furniture designers. Vitra is also known for the works of notable architects that make up its premises in Weil am Rhein, Germany, in particular the Vitra Design Museum.

== History and corporate architecture ==
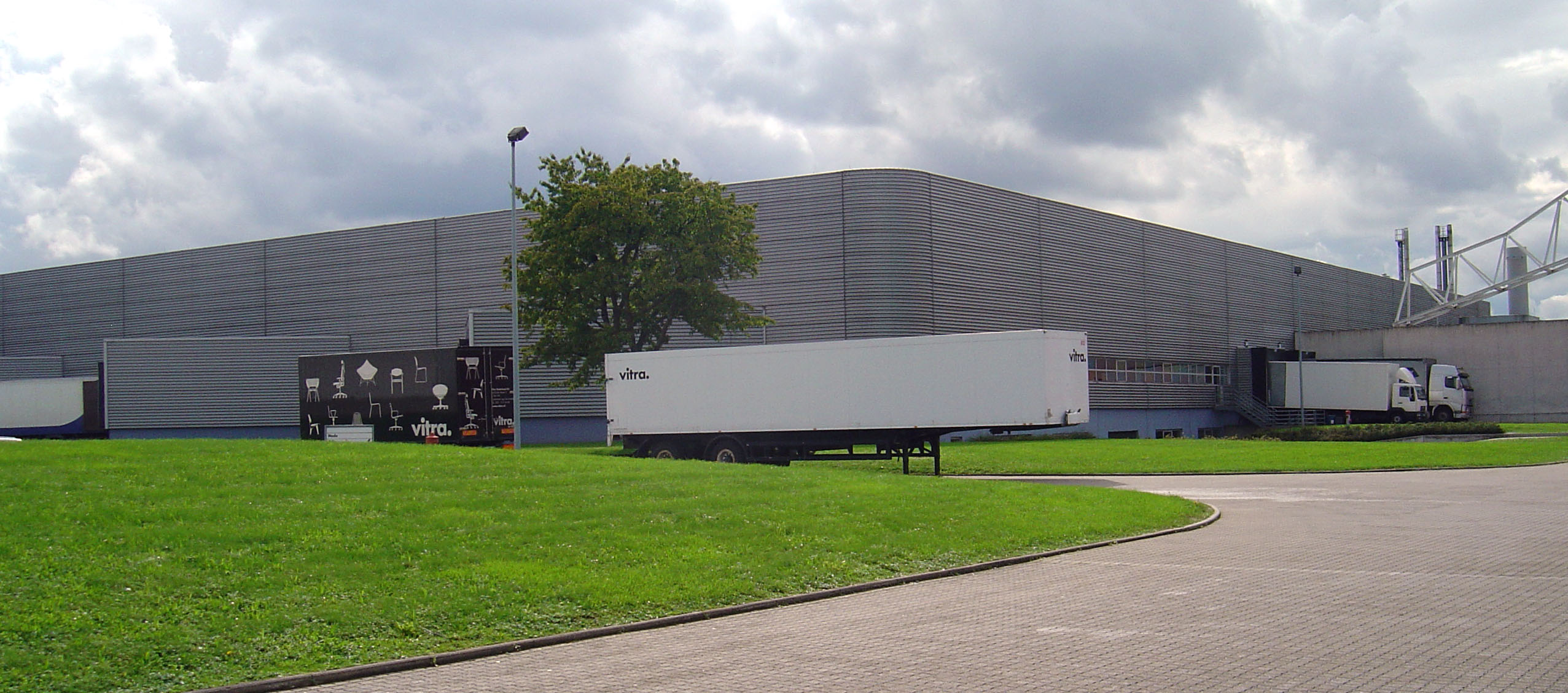
Factory building, Nicholas Grimshaw

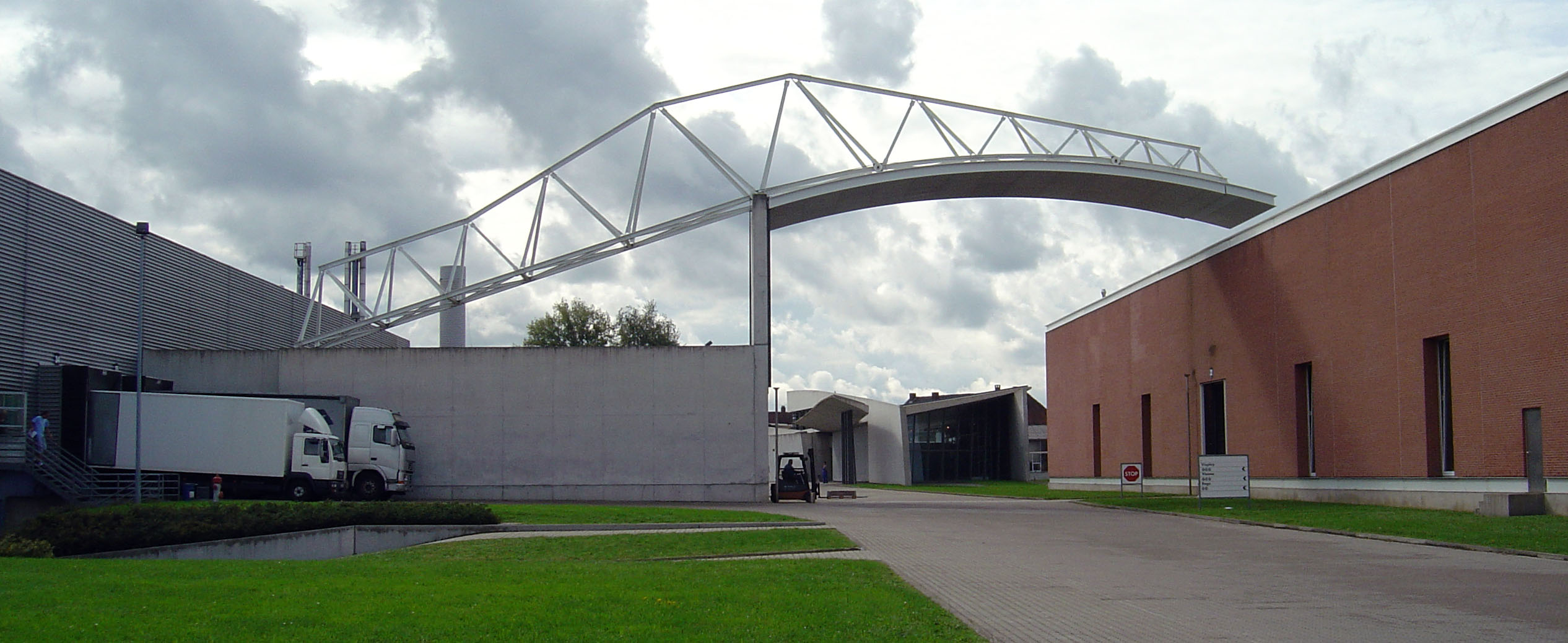
Factory building and passage cover, Álvaro Siza

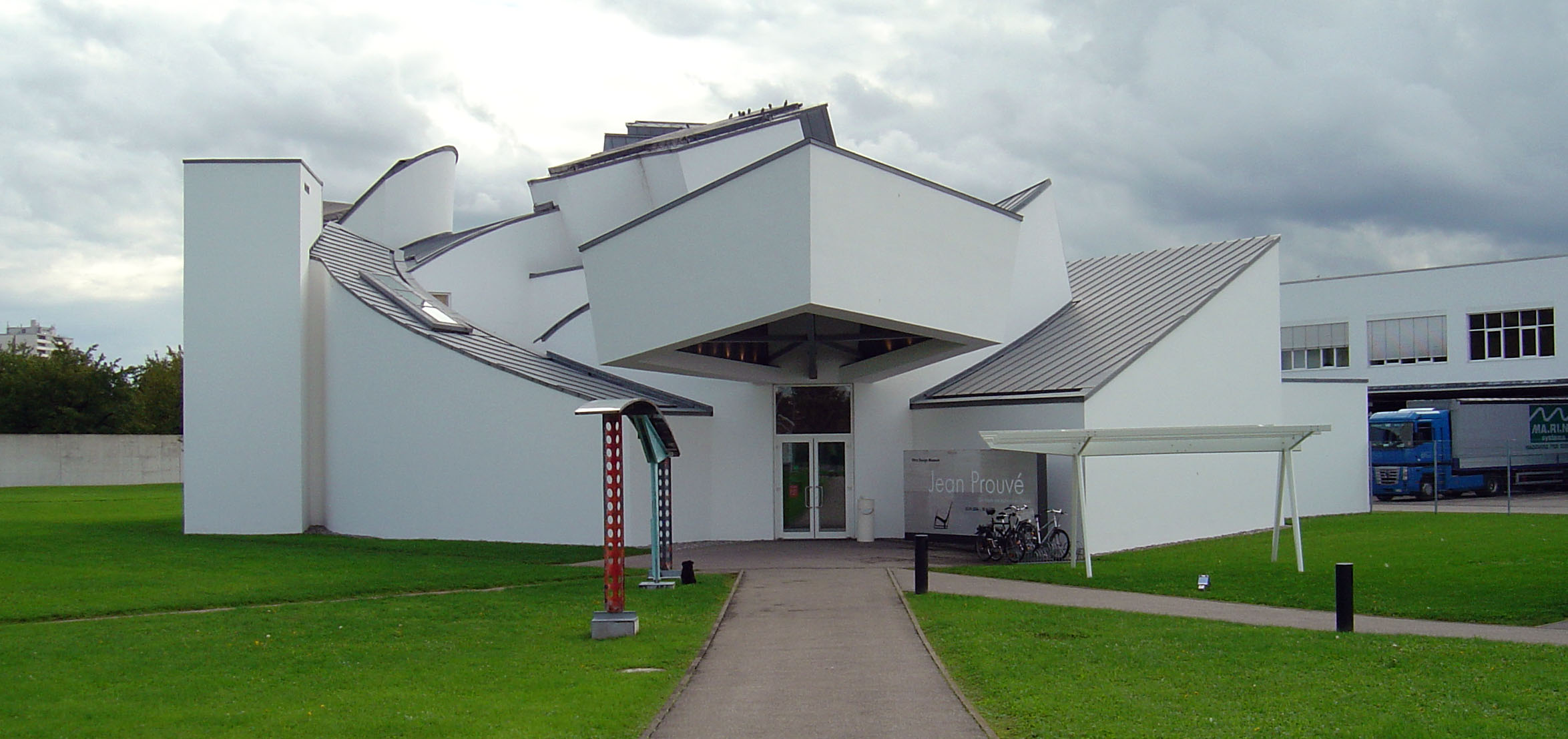
Vitra Design Museum, Frank Gehry

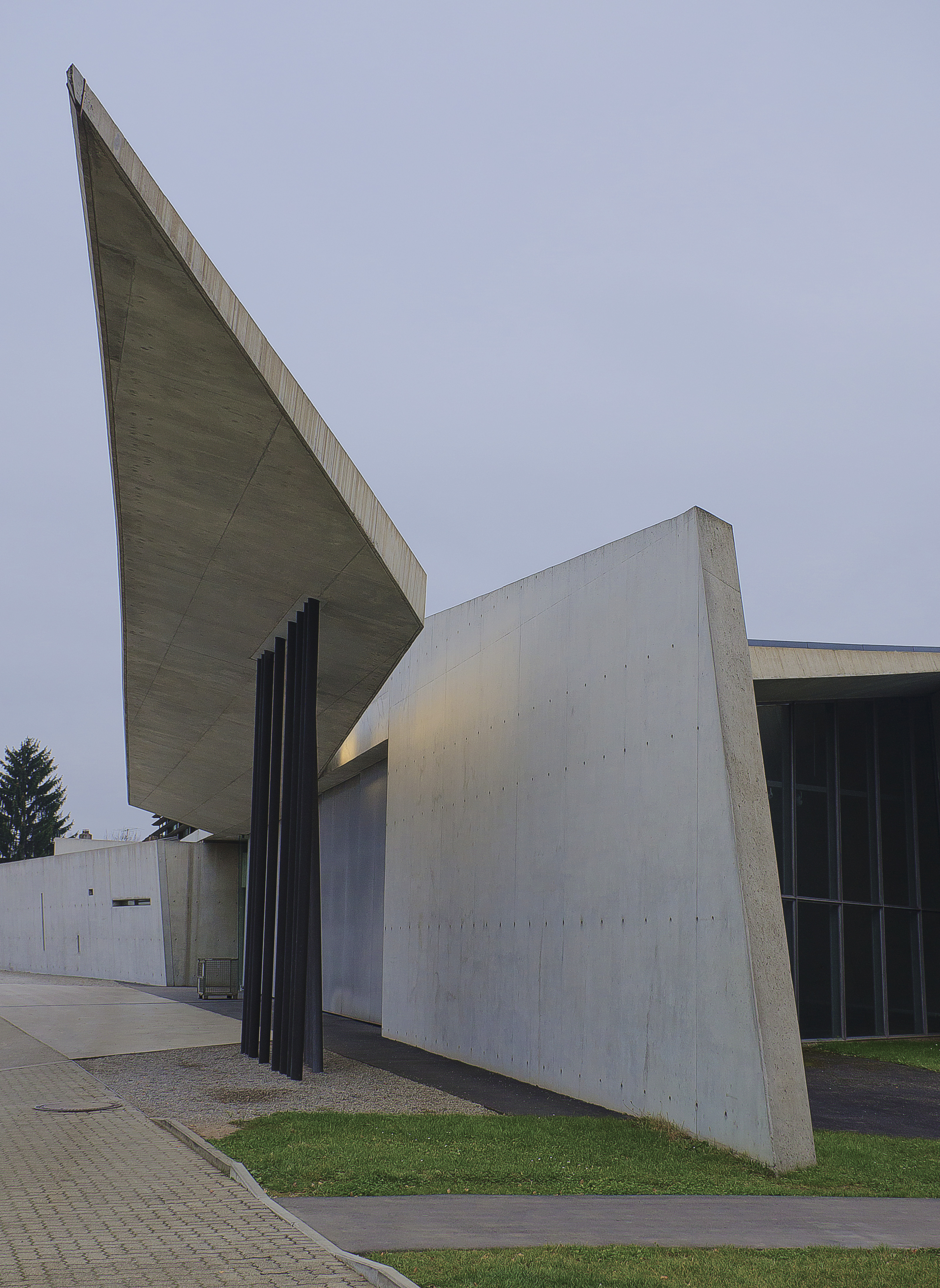
Vitra Fire Station, Zaha Hadid

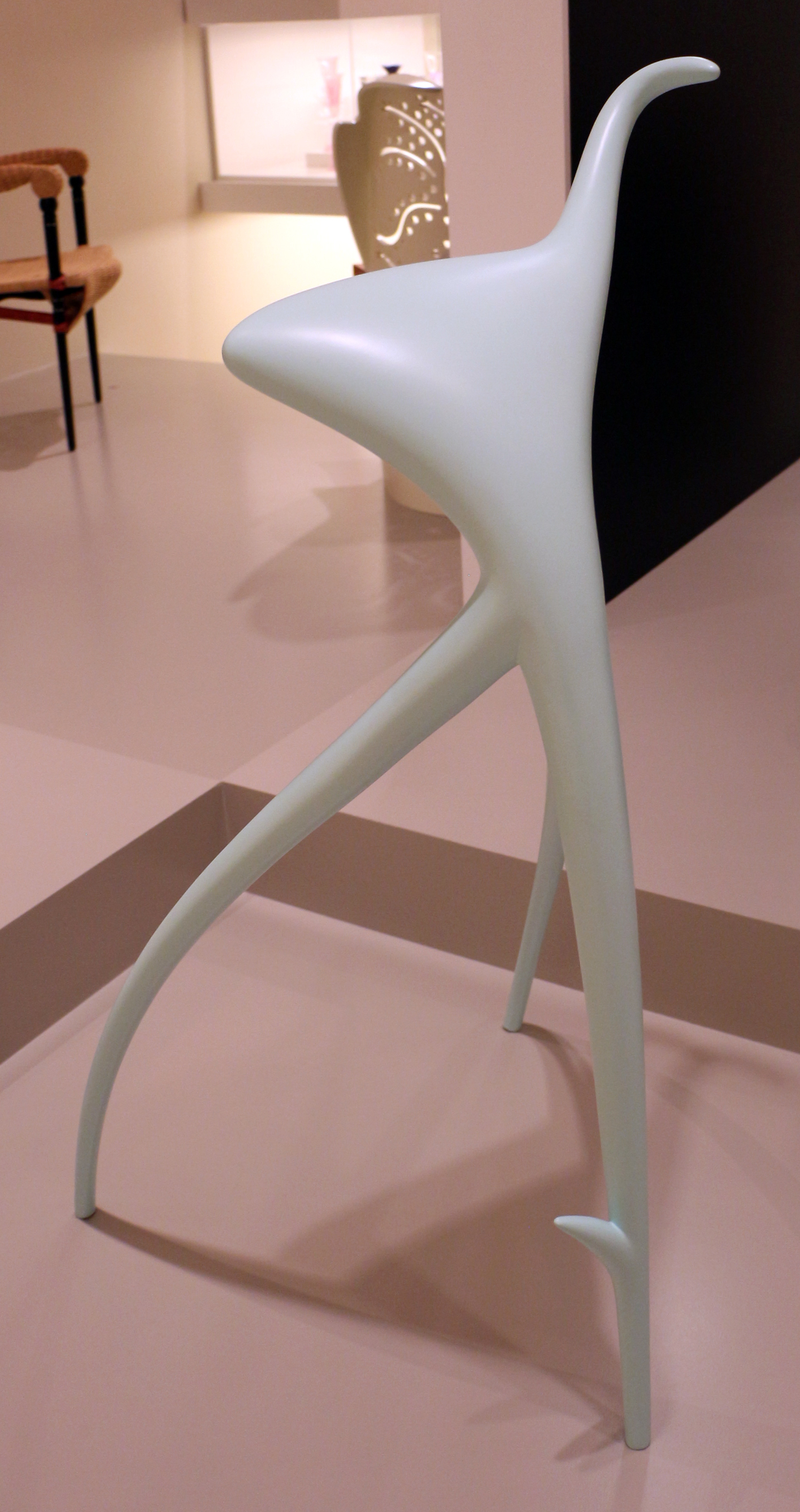
W.W. stool designed by Philippe Starck

Vitra was founded by Willi and Erika Fehlbaum in 1950. The couple visited New York City in 1953 and discovered the furniture designs of Charles and Ray Eames and George Nelson. Fehlbaum negotiated with Herman Miller to produce these designs in Europe and began manufacturing in 1957.

In 1967, the company introduced the Panton Chair by Verner Panton, the first cantilever chair out of plastic. In 1977, Rolf Fehlbaum took over the management of Vitra.

In 1984, the partnership that had been formed with Herman Miller was terminated by mutual consent. Subsequently, Vitra obtained the rights to designs by Charles and Ray Eames and George Nelson for Europe and the Middle East.

Vitra's product line consists of designer furniture for use in offices, homes and public areas. In 2002, the company took in the realm of domestic living. Launched in 2004, the Home Collection includes classic furniture design pieces by Charles and Ray Eames, George Nelson, Verner Panton, Alexander Girard and Jean Prouvé, as well as the works of designers such as Antonio Citterio, Jasper Morrison, Alberto Meda, Maarten van Severen, Benjamin Hubert, Ronan and Erwan Bouroullec, Hella Jongerius and BarberOsgerby.

A major fire destroyed a large part of the Vitra production facilities in Weil am Rhein in 1981. British architect Nicholas Grimshaw was commissioned to design new factory buildings and develop a master plan for the company's campus. Inspired by his acquaintance with Frank Gehry in the mid-1980s, Vitra departed from Grimshaw's plan for a unified corporate project. Since that time, buildings have been erected on the Vitra grounds in Weil am Rhein by a wide-ranging group of architects, including Frank Gehry (Vitra Design Museum and Factory Building, 1989), Zaha Hadid (Vitra Fire Station, 1993), Tadao Ando (Conference Pavilion, 1993), Alvaro Siza (Factory Building, Passage Cover, Car Parking, 1994), Herzog & de Meuron (VitraHaus, 2010), and SANAA (Factory Building, 2011).

With the aim of making the collection accessible to the public, a museum was established as an independent foundation dedicated to the research and popularization of design and architecture. The Vitra Design Museum from 1989 by Frank Gehry was the first public building on the campus as well as the architect's first building in Europe.

The Vitra fire station by Zaha Hadid was the first completed building by the Iraqi architect. The building consists of a garage for fire engines, showers and locker rooms for the fire fighters and a conference room with kitchen facilities. The Fire Station is a sculpture of cast in-situ concrete that contrasts with the orthogonal order of the adjacent factory buildings like the frozen image of an explosion in a photograph. Today the building functions as an exhibition space.

In the same year, a conference pavilion of Japanese architect Tadao Ando was also constructed on the Vitra grounds. It was Ando's first work outside Japan. The calm and restrained structure encompasses an assortment of conference rooms. It is characterized by a highly ordered spatial articulation with a large part of its volume concealed below grade. A striking feature is the footpath leading to the pavilion, which has a significant association with meditation paths in the gardens of Japanese monasteries.

In the year 2000, the Campus was augmented with the addition of the Dome: a lightweight geodesic structure after Richard Buckminster Fuller, which was developed by T.C. Howard at Charter Industries in 1975 and transplanted from its original location in Detroit, USA, to Weil am Rhein. It is currently used as a space for events. In 2003, a petrol station by the French designer Jean Prouvé—originally constructed in 1953—was moved to the Vitra Campus.

The VitraHaus by Herzog & de Meuron, the latest addition to the Vitra Campus, opened in 2010 as the company's flagship store and home of the Vitra Home Collection. The concept of the VitraHaus connects two themes that appear repeatedly in the oeuvre of the Basel-based architects: the theme of the archetypal house and the theme of stacked volumes.

In June 2013, the Renzo Piano-designed small house, Diogene, was unveiled.

In June 2014, the Vitra Slide Tower was inaugurated.

In June 2016, the Vitra Schaudepot was opened to further display the collection of the Vitra Design Museum.

In June 2021, a garden planted by Piet Oudolf was opened to the public.

The Vitra Campus also holds and displays the Barragán Archive, with a permanent exhibition of Luis Barragán's works available to the public.

== Acquisitions ==
In 2013, the company acquired the furniture brand Artek.

== Awards and projects ==
Vitra's products have received numerous design-related awards by international organizations. Vitra products have been used in numerous high-profile settings, including the plenary chamber of the German Bundestag, the Tate Modern in London, the Centre Pompidou in Paris, Deutsche Bank headquarters in Frankfurt, Novartis in Basel, Dubai International Airport or the Munich International Airport.

== Locations ==
The company's website lists national subsidiaries in Austria, Belgium, China, the Czech Republic, France, Germany, India, Japan, Mexico, the Netherlands, Norway, Slovakia, Spain, Sweden, Switzerland, United Kingdom and the United States. Vitra also has showrooms in numerous international cities. Production sites are located in Weil am Rhein (Germany), Szombathely (Hungary), Neuenburg (Germany), Allentown (United States), Zhuhai (China) and Sugito (Japan).

== See also ==
- Rolf Fehlbaum
- Vitra Design Museum
