= Rolf Fehlbaum =

Swiss businessman (born 1941)

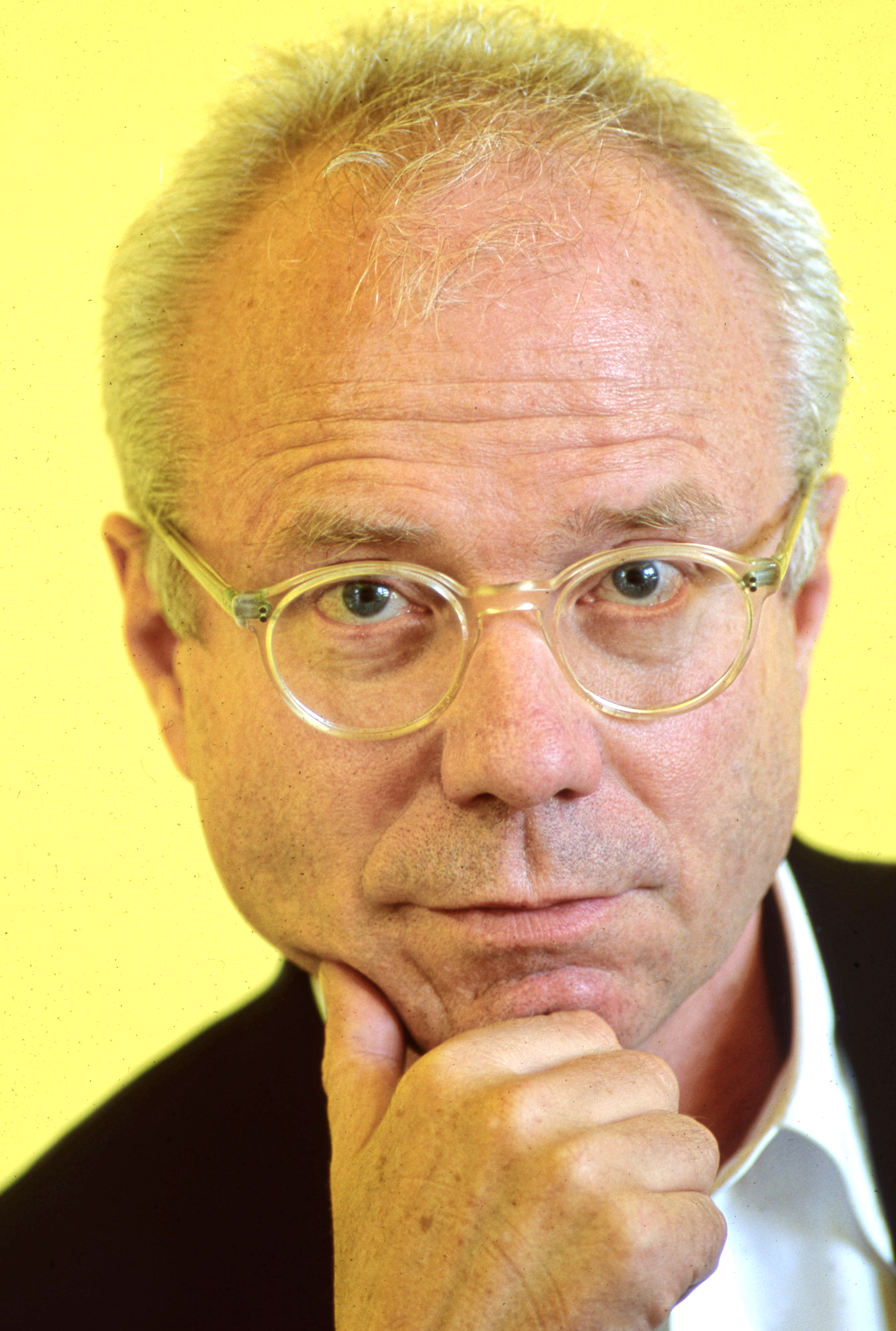
- Rolf Fehlbaum, Birsfelden 1996.
- Born: Rolf Fehlbaum; April 6, 1941 (age 85); Basel, Switzerland
- Education: University of Freiburg
- Years active: 1960–present
- Known for: Design company Vitra

Rolf Fehlbaum (born April 6, 1941 in Basel) is chairman emeritus and active member of the board of directors of Vitra, a family-owned furniture company with headquarters in Birsfelden, Switzerland.

== Education and early life ==
Rolf Fehlbaum, the eldest son of Willi and Erika Fehlbaum, was born in 1941 in Basel. After receiving his Matura diploma, he studied social sciences at the Universities of Freiburg i. Br. and later in Munich, Bern and Basel. He completed his academic studies in 1967 with a doctoral thesis, written under the supervision of Edgar Salin, on the topic of Saint-Simonism. Upon completion of his studies, Rolf Fehlbaum worked for a short time in his parents’ firm. In 1970 he moved to Munich to work as an editor and producer for the Bavaria Film Company and from 1973 to 1977 he was responsible for education and training at the Bavarian Chamber of Architects.

== Vitra ==
The Vitra Company, which was founded by Willi and Erika Fehlbaum as a shopfitting business, entered the furniture market in 1957 with the licensed production of furniture from the Herman Miller Collection – primarily designs by Charles and Ray Eames and George Nelson – for the European market. In 1967, the company introduced the Panton Chair by Verner Panton – the first cantilever chair out of plastic. In 1977, Rolf Fehlbaum took over the management of Vitra. In 1984, the partnership that had been formed with Herman Miller in 1957 was terminated by mutual consent. Subsequently, Vitra obtained the rights to designs by Charles and Ray Eames and George Nelson for the Europe and the Middle East.

In 1981, a major fire strongly affected the development of the company. The reconstruction of the production facilities in Weil am Rhein led to the Vitra Campus. After the reconstruction of the site, the first public building on the campus was the Vitra Design Museum, initiated by Fehlbaum. Founded in 1989 and housed in a building by Frank Gehry, the museum is partly based on the own broad collection of 20th century furniture as well as host of visiting exhibitions.

Initiated in 1993, the research and exhibition project Citizen Office: Ideas and Notes on a New Office World, led to an internationally travelling exhibition of the Vitra Design Museum. A new vision for the office evolved, in cooperation with Andrea Branzi, Michele De Lucchi, Ettore Sottsass and James Irvine, that was based on the premise that an office is not only a workspace, but also a living space. This led to the logical conclusion that the design of an office should take the emotional and social needs of employees into account, which has since had a lasting effect on the formulation of design ideas linked to contemporary offices. From the 1970s until the late 1990s, Vitra focused on the office furniture sector.

In 2002, Fehlbaum initiated a new direction for the company, which also took in the realm of domestic living. In this sense, within the framework of discussions with Jasper Morrison and the brothers Ronan and Erwan Bouroullec, the basic concept of the Vitra Home Collection was developed. Launched in 2004, the Home Collection includes Vitra Classics as well as contemporary designs.

In 2013, Rolf Fehlbaum withdrew from daily business operations with the company.

== Design and architecture ==
Rolf Fehlbaum became acquainted with prominent designers such as George Nelson and Charles and Ray Eames at an early age – initially in his role as a translator for his father. In 1960, a trip to the United States lasting several months gave him the opportunity to meet George Nelson in New York City, the Eameses in Los Angeles, and Alexander Girard in New Mexico. Fehlbaum developed an especially close relationship with Nelson, who had a formative influence on his understanding of design.

Italian design moved to the forefront of his interest from the 1960s onwards, and increasingly so in the 1970s. This resulted in a longstanding collaboration between Vitra and Mario Bellini, which began in 1979 and continues today. Vitra's cooperation with Antonio Citterio started in 1985. In 1994, Alberto Meda became the third Italian to develop a lasting relationship with Vitra. Fehlbaum's interests moved into other areas in the late 1980s. The first Vitra Edition from 1987 was an indication of this trend, as well as the beginning of the company's collaboration with Jasper Morrison in 1989. Collaborative work with Maarten van Severen, the brothers Ronan and Erwan Bouroullec, and Hella Jongerius has since been pursued.

Fehlbaum has also worked with a number of graphic designers. Pierre Mendell defined the visual identity of Vitra for many years and also designed the company's logo: the brand name with the dot. In the 1990s, Fehlbaum developed a close relationship with Tibor Kalman, resulting in a number of projects including the 1998 book Chairman Rolf Fehlbaum. More recently, a similar working relationship was established with Cornel Windlin, who designed the first Vitra Home catalogues and conceived the publication Project Vitra – a survey of the company's history, self-image and products – together with Fehlbaum in 2008.

Architecture emerged as Fehlbaum's second major interest. In the beginning of the 1980s, he commissioned Nicholas Grimshaw to construct new factory buildings and develop a plan for the company premises after a fire had destroyed a large part of the facilities. However, Fehlbaum departed from Grimshaw's plan for a unified corporate project in favour of a more pluralistic approach. Since that time, buildings have been erected on the Vitra grounds in Weil am Rhein by a wide-ranging group of architects, including Frank Gehry (Vitra Design Museum and Factory Building, 1989), Zaha Hadid (Fire Station, 1993), Tadao Ando (Conference Pavilion, 1993), Alvaro Siza (Factory Building, 1994), Herzog & de Meuron (VitraHaus, 2010), and SANAA (Factory Building, 2011). With the exception of the two most recent projects, Fehlbaum commissioned all of these architects before they became as well known as they are today. Fehlbaum's election to the jury of the Pritzker Prize, where he served as a member from 2004 to 2010, was an acknowledgement of his contribution to contemporary architecture.

In addition to his role as an entrepreneur and architectural client, Rolf Fehlbaum is also active as a collector. His interest in everyday popular culture was the starting point for a personal hobby – his collection of Japanese robotic toys –, whereas professional reasons played a role in his collection of industrial furniture design, which he started in the 1980s. These pieces form the core of the Vitra Design Museum Collection, and Fehlbaum remains close to this project as it expands.

== Awards (Selection) ==
- 1991: Design Award, Industrie Forum Design Hannover
- 1994: European Community Design Prize, Amsterdam
- 1994: Lucky Strike Designer Award, Raymond Loewy Foundation
- 1997: Bundespreis Förderer des Designs, Rat für Formgebung
- 1998: Interieur Biennale Kortrijk
- 2004: Compasso d’Oro „Premio speciale europeo"
- 2005: D’S Design Center AG, Merit
- 2010: Honorary Doctor, Royal College of Art
- 2010: Honorary Fellow, RIBA (Royal Institute of British Architects)

== See also ==
- Vitra
- Vitra Design Museum
