= Maarten van Severen =

Maarten Van Severen (5 June 1956, Antwerp, Belgium – 21 February 2005, Ghent, Belgium) was a Belgian furniture designer and interior architect. He came from an artistic family: his father was the abstract painter Dan Van Severen while his brother, Fabian Van Severen, is also a designer. Maarten Van Severen started out studying architecture in Ghent, designing furniture from 1986 onward. He is considered one of the few Belgian designers who have achieved international success.

== Summary ==
The son of an abstract painter, Maarten Van Severen chose to study architecture at the Royal Academy of Fine Arts (Ghent). He completed three years before going to work in various agencies for interior design and furniture until 1986, when he began to design furniture. Van Severen's first piece, a long and slender steel table, has since been recreated as an aluminum model, which has been further refined over the years. In 1989 Van Severen produced his first wooden table. In 1990 he turned his attention to chairs. His work, hand-produced in his workshop in Ghent, reflects his quest for perfection in form, detail and fabrication. Van Severen subsequently worked in various different materials, from aluminium and plywood to bakelite and polyester. His initial work is still manufactured by Vitra and aiki (formerly tm/top mouton) today.

Van Severen was also frequently commissioned as a decorator and furniture designer for private residence projects, teamed with Rem Koolhaas. They worked together on the Villa dall'Ava in 1990, then again in Bordeaux in 1996 (Maison ‡ Floirac, OMA). He has also created exhibition stands of steel shelving for use at shows and trade fairs.

From 1997 onward, he had been involved in industrial production for Target Lighting (U-Line lamp), Obumex (kitchen), Vitra (chair .03), Edra (Blue Bench), BULO (Schraag), among others.

Van Severen died of cancer at the age of 48. In accordance with his wish that his artistic legacy be unlocked and made accessible for research, Van Severen's family and friends created the Maarten Van Severen Foundation, which has since been working on the inventory of the Maarten Van Severen archive. The archive is kept in De Zwarte Doos – City Archives Ghent. Also partnered in the project are the Center for Flemish Architecture Archives, the Design Museum Ghent and the Department of Architecture and Urban Planning at Ghent University.

== Bibliography ==
- Bekaert, Geert. Maarten Van Severen. Brussels: Ludion, 2000. ISBN 9055442801
- Van Severen, Maarten. Werken — Work. Oostkamp: Stichting Kunstboek, 2004. ISBN 90-5856-155-0
- Van Severen, Maarten. For My Eyes Only. Gent: De Coker Gallery, 2005.
