= Vitra Design Museum =

Museum in Weil am Rhein

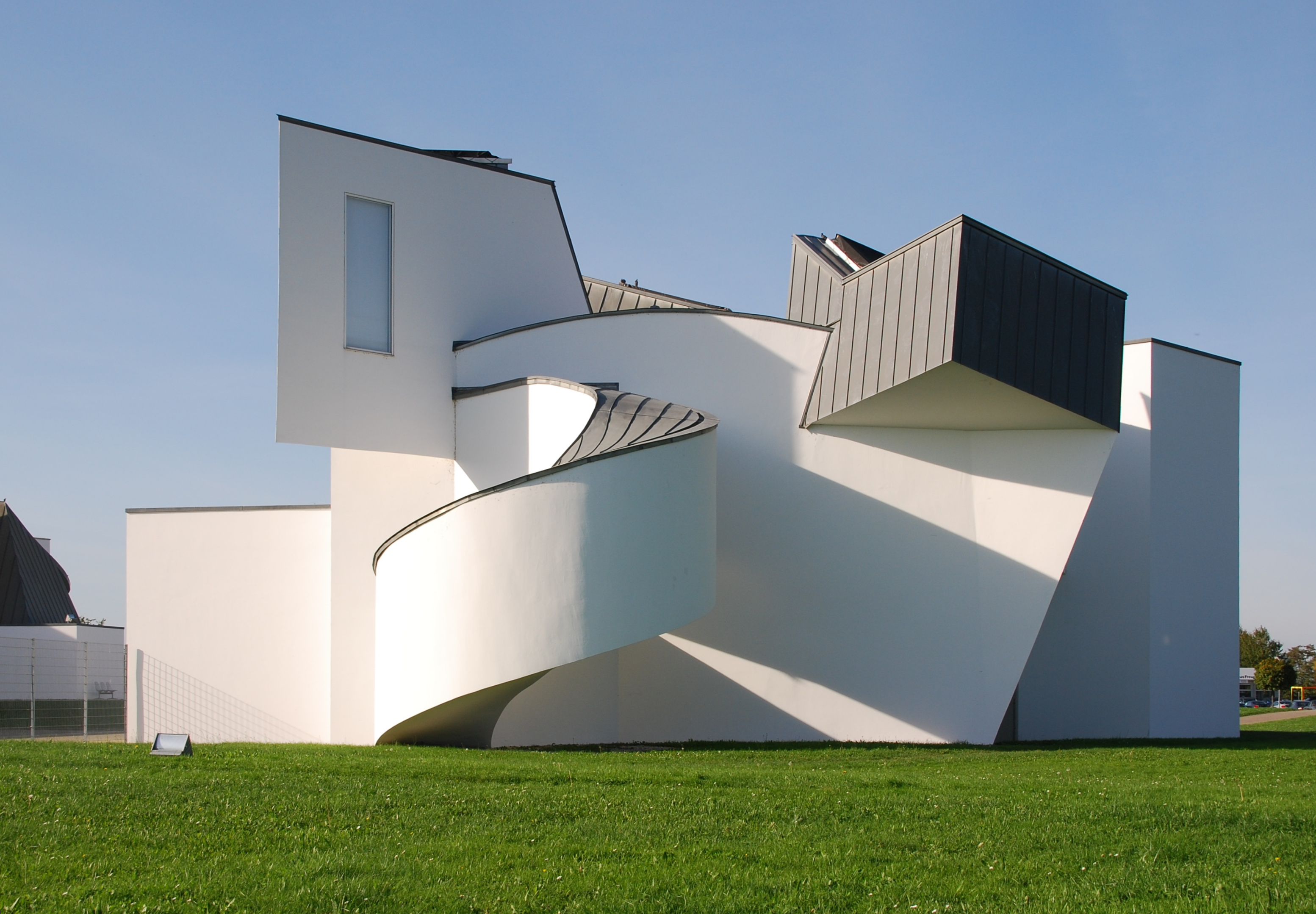
- The Vitra Design Museum building by Frank O. Gehry, side view
- Established: 1989
- Location: Weil am Rhein, Germany
- Coordinates: 47°36′10″N 7°37′05″E
- Founder: Rolf Fehlbaum
- Architect: Frank Gehry

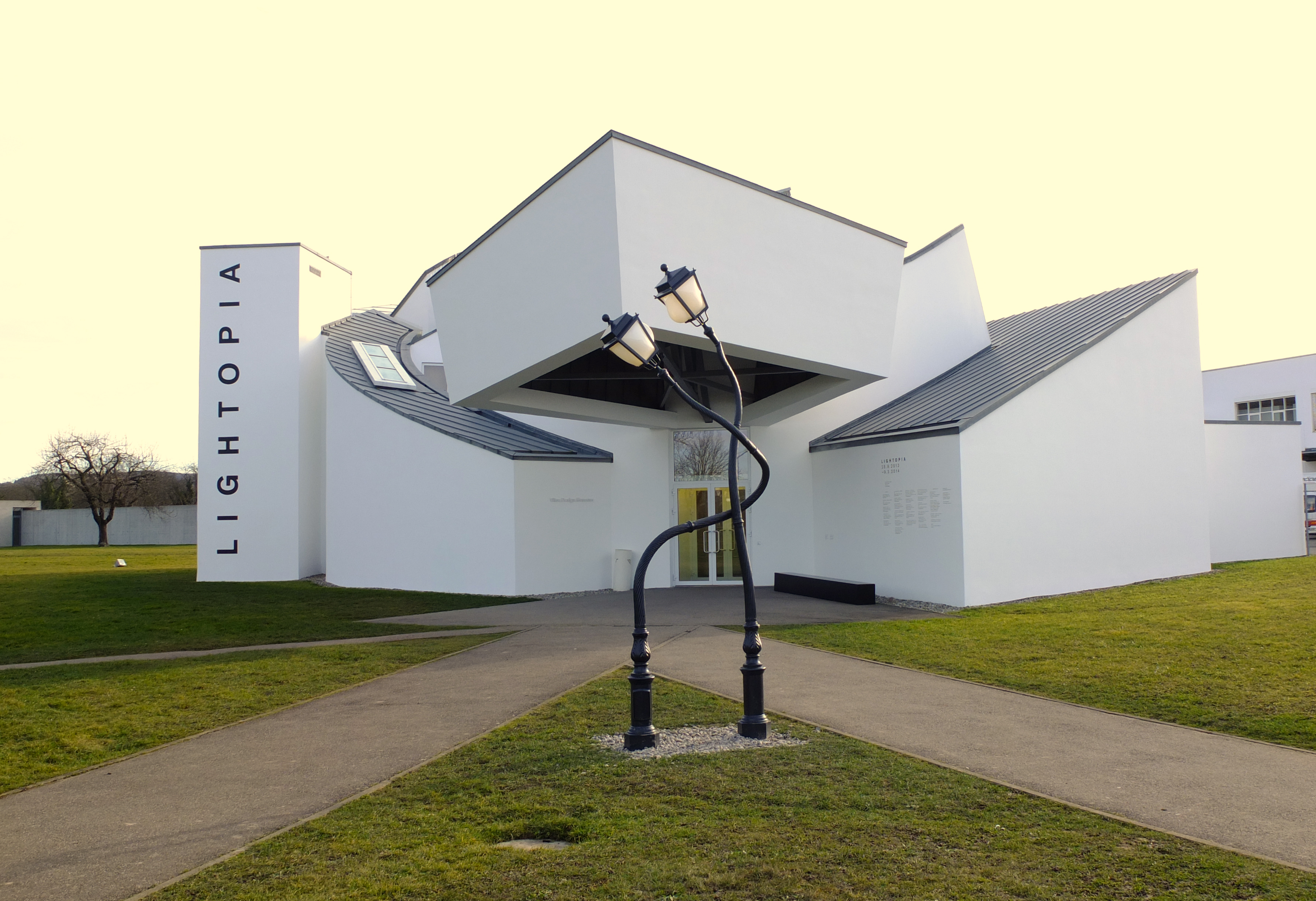

The Vitra Design Museum is a privately owned museum for design in Weil am Rhein, Germany, near Basel, Switzerland. The museum building is by Frank Gehry.

Former Vitra CEO, and son of Vitra founders Willi and Erika Fehlbaum, Rolf Fehlbaum founded the museum in 1989 as an independent private foundation. The Vitra corporation provides it with financial subsidy, the use of Vitra architecture, and organizational cooperation.

== Collection and activities ==
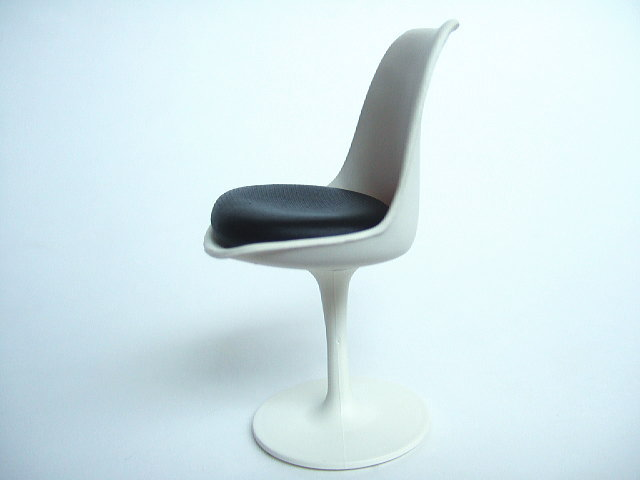
Eero Saarinen's Tulip Chair, one of the pieces represented in the permanent collection.

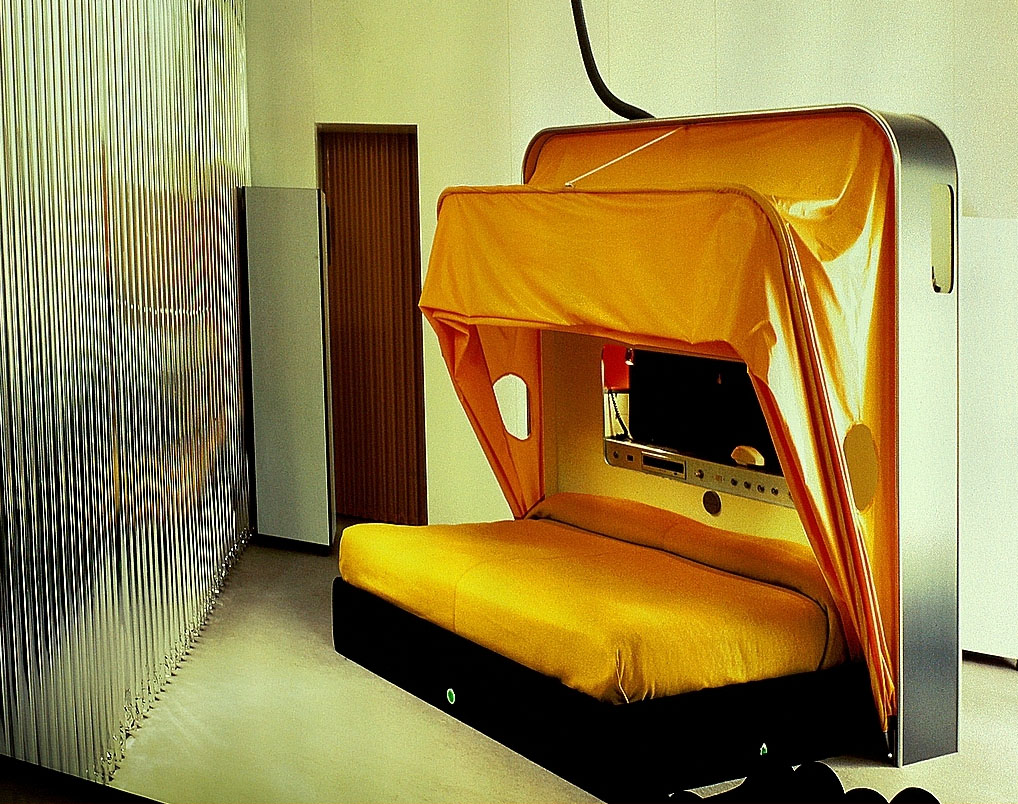
Cabriolet Bed, from an exposition of works by Joe Cesare Colombo.

The museum's collection, focusing on furniture and interior design, is centered on the bequest of U.S. designers Charles and Ray Eames, as well as numerous works of designers such as George Nelson, Alvar Aalto, Verner Panton, Dieter Rams, Jean Prouvé, Richard Hutten and Michael Thonet. It is one of the world's largest collections of modern furniture design, including pieces representative of all major periods and styles from the beginning of the nineteenth century onwards.

These works, originally the private collection of Rolf Fehlbaum, are now permanently on display at the newly completed Schaudepot building on the Vitra premises. In addition, the museum puts on temporary exhibitions in the main building, often with loans from other collections. In turn, parts of the collection are lent to other institutions around the world.

In addition, the museum produces workshops, publications and museum products, as well as maintaining an archive, a restoration and conservation laboratory, and a research library. It also organises guided tours of the Vitra premises, a major attraction to those interested in modern architecture. The museum produced the travelling exhibition 'Rudolf Steiner – Alchemy of the Everyday', a major retrospective exhibition drawn from its own collection and borrowed exhibits, coinciding with the one hundred and fiftieth anniversary of the birth of its subject.

Radical Design is an art exhibition that was shown in the museum in the 1960s and 70s. This exhibition was not shown in the main building, but in one of the storage buildings that also shows work of the museum. The architects of this storage unit, Schaudepot, was Herzog & de Meuron. The storage unit opened in June of 2016 and the Radical Design was the first exhibition. This exhibition shows work from Italian artists that were going against the times of consumerism and mass production. Because of their beliefs there were very few building contracts so these groups were formed to create work that was absurd, provocative, fantastical, and contradictory. Seven of these projects were shown in the museums storage unit. This additional building is large so it can exhibit some of their larger pieces. The artwork is shown in the long hallways that are sectioned off. The work for the Radical Design exhibition is presented in context of other works to show the history and to better understand that history behind the work and what preceded the times.

Cubism is a movement that happened all over Europe during the early 20th century. Czech Cubism is a movement that happened in the Czech Republic and was based on the decorative arts and architecture which is the main exhibitions in the Vitra museum. Alexander von Vegesack published a book about this topic in 1991. This book discusses the movement of Cubism itself, but also how this movement affected architecture, and specifically what was happening with Czech architects, painters, sculptors, and authors. This group of artist created an exhibition that travelled throughout the Czech Republic and was exhibited in the Vitra Design Museum in the late 1900s which reintroduced the culture to Europe.

== Museum building ==
The museum building, an architectural attraction in its own right, was Frank O. Gehry's first building in Europe, realised in cooperation with the Lörrach architect Günter Pfeifer. Together with the museum, which was originally just designed to house Rolf Fehlbaum's private collection, Gehry also built a more functional-looking production hall and a gatehouse for the close-by Vitra factory.

Although Gehry used his trademark sculptural deconstructivist style for the museum building, he did not opt for his usual mix of materials, but limited himself to white plaster and a titanium–zinc alloy. For the first time, he allowed curved forms to break up his more usual angular shapes. The sloping white forms appear to echo the Notre Dame du Haut chapel by Le Corbusier in Ronchamp, France, not far from Weil.

The building was based on the art movement of deconstructivism and deconstructive architecture. This movement moves away from rational architecture and unity, harmony, and continuity. These architectural designs were geometric without being rectilinear but rather distorted and displaced. Instead it follows the golden rectangle which is a proportional system that allows the work to function proportionally.

Architecture critic Paul Heyer described the general impression on the visitor as

“... a continuous changing swirl of white forms on the exterior, each seemingly without apparent relationship to the other, with its interiors a dynamically powerful interplay, in turn directly expressive of the exterior convolutions. As a totality it resolves itself into an entwined coherent display...”

The building backs the factory fence and is embedded in a meadow adorned with cherry trees. Claes Oldenburg and Coosje van Bruggen's prominent sculpture Balancing Tools provides a colourful contrast, while Tadao Ando's nearby conference pavilion gives a more muted one. The neighboring Vitra Fire Station ( a former fire station) is used for some of the events and exhibitions of the museum.

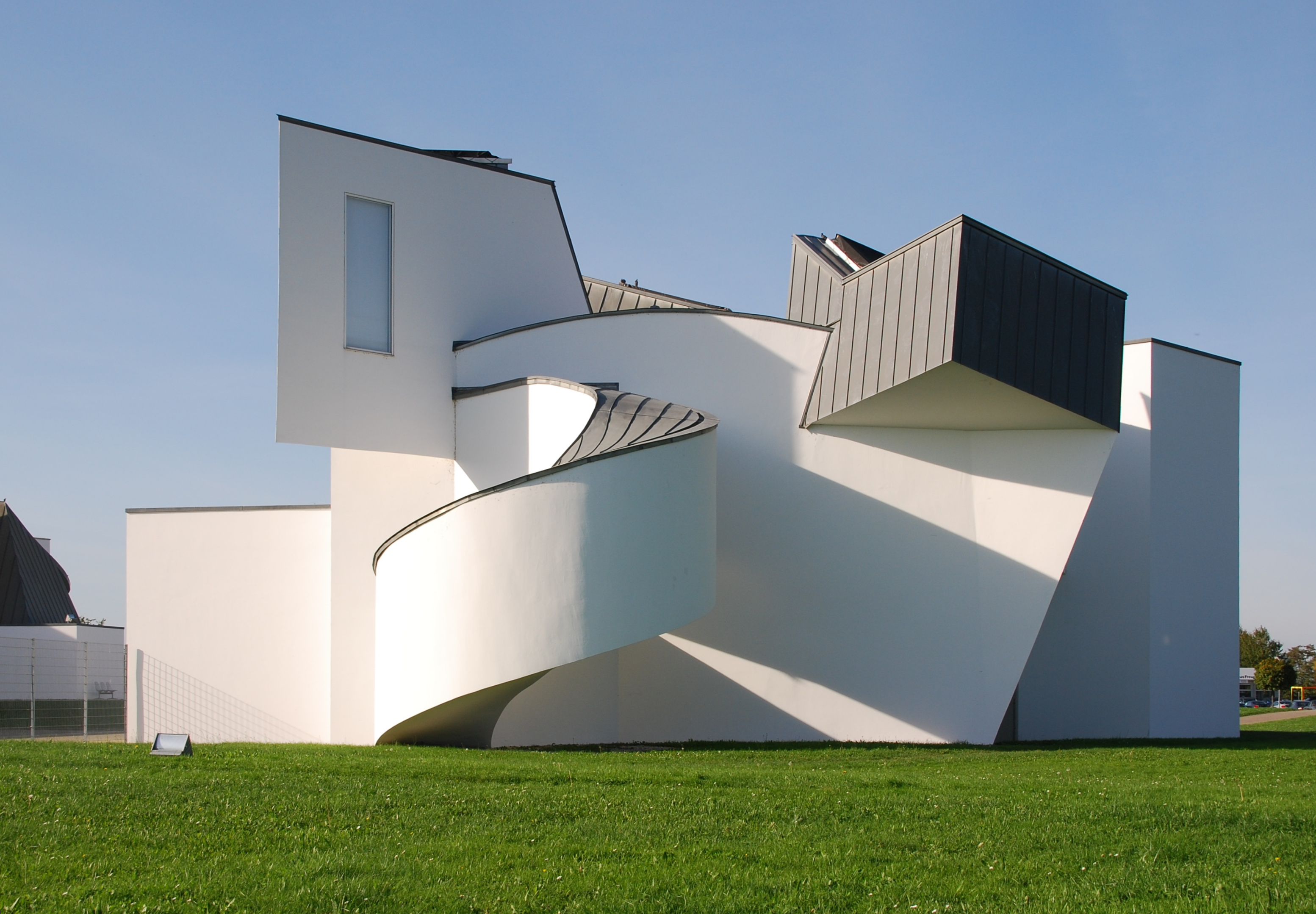
East side view

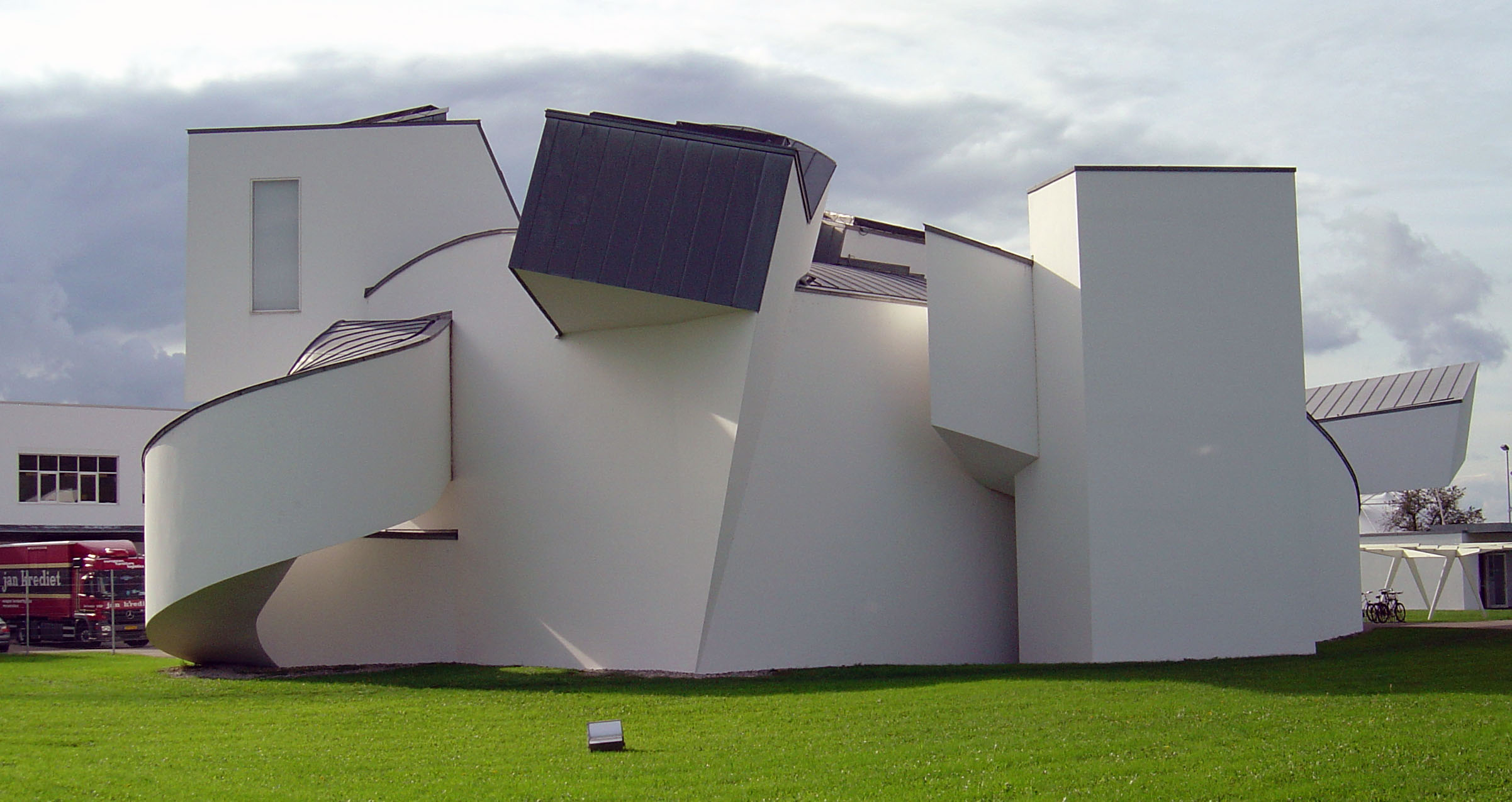
Street side view

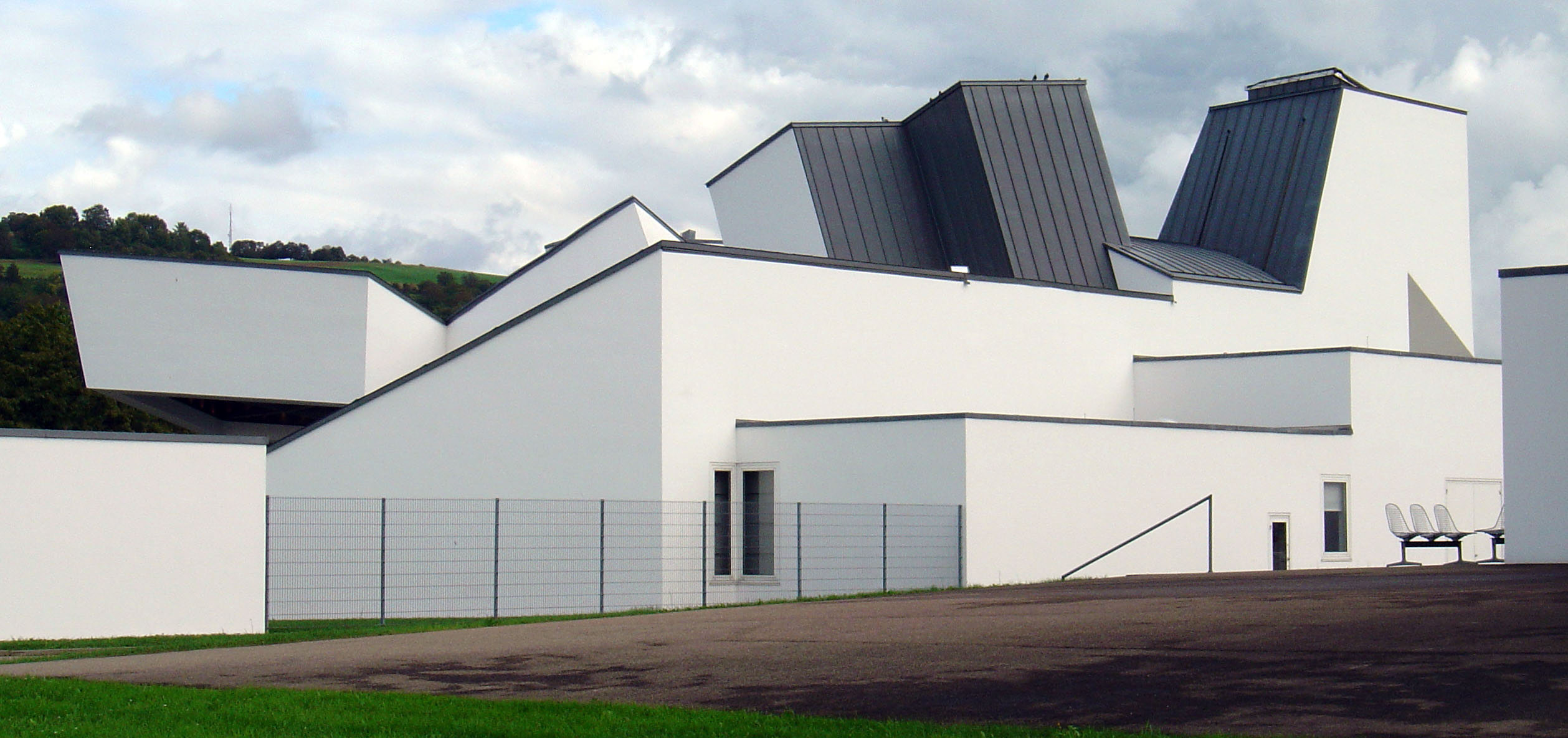
Factory side view

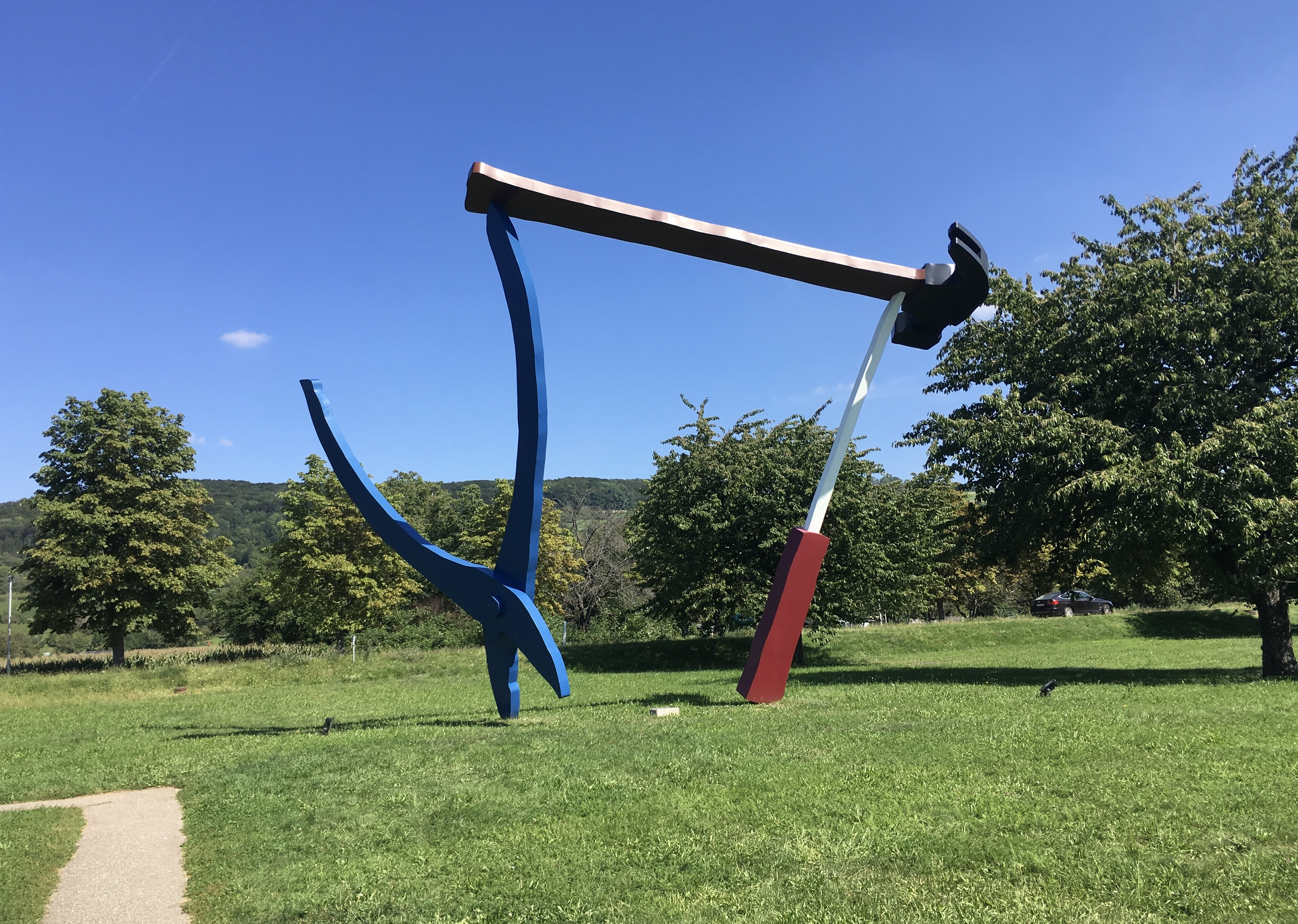
The nearby Balancing Tools by Claes Oldenburg and Coosje van Bruggen

== See also ==
- List of works by Frank Gehry
