= Rocking chair =

Type of chair

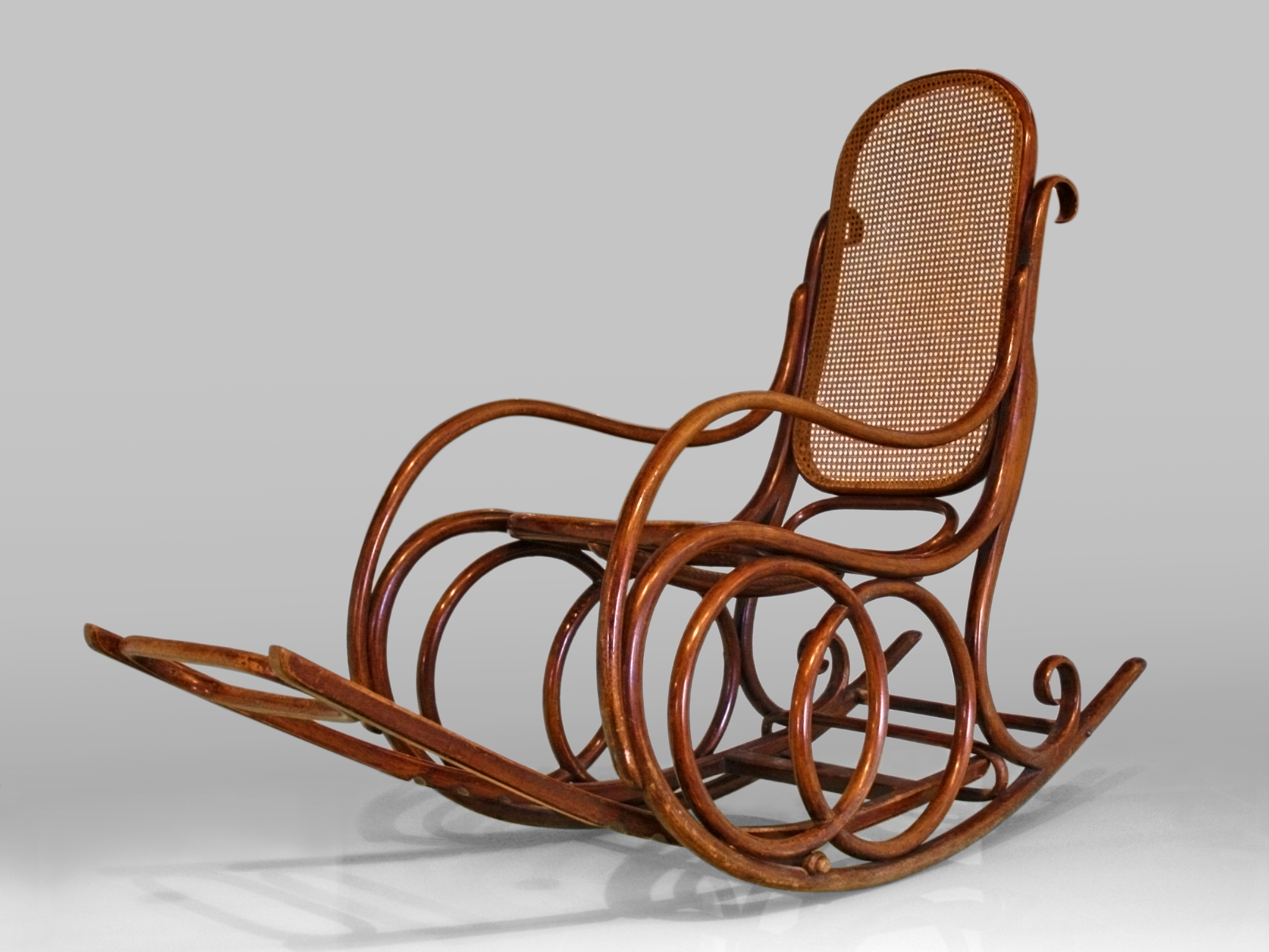
A Thonet rocking chair

A rocking chair or rocker is a type of chair with two curved bands (also known as rockers) attached to the bottom of the legs, connecting the legs on each side to each other. The rockers contact the floor at only two points, giving the occupant the ability to rock back and forth by shifting their weight or pushing lightly with their feet. Rocking chairs are most commonly made of wood. Some rocking chairs can fold.

== Etymology ==
The word rocking chair comes from the verb to rock. The first known use of the term rocking chair was in 1766.

== Purpose ==
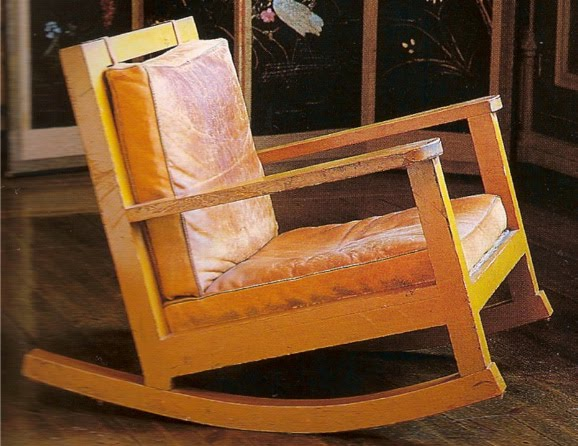
A rocking chair designed by Swedish painter and furniture designer, Karin Larsson

Rocking chairs are often seen as evocative of parenting — as the gentle rocking motion soothes infants and sends them off to sleep.

Many adults find rocking chairs soothing because of the gentle motion. Gentle rocking motion has been shown to provide faster onset of sleep than remaining stationary, mimicking the process of a parent rocking a child to sleep.

Varieties of rockers include those mounted on a spring base (or platform) called "platform rockers" and those with swinging braces commonly known as gliders.

== History ==
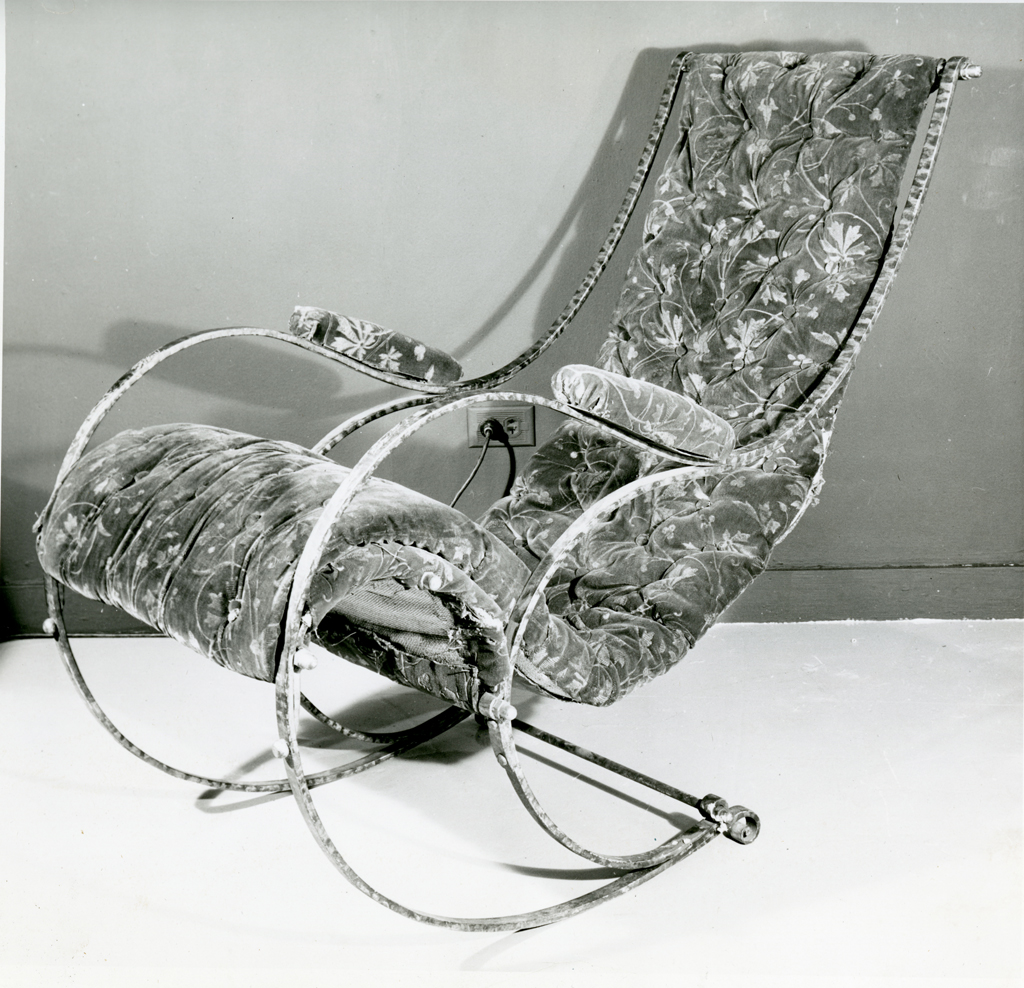
Peter Cooper designed iron-framed rocking chair from the 1830s

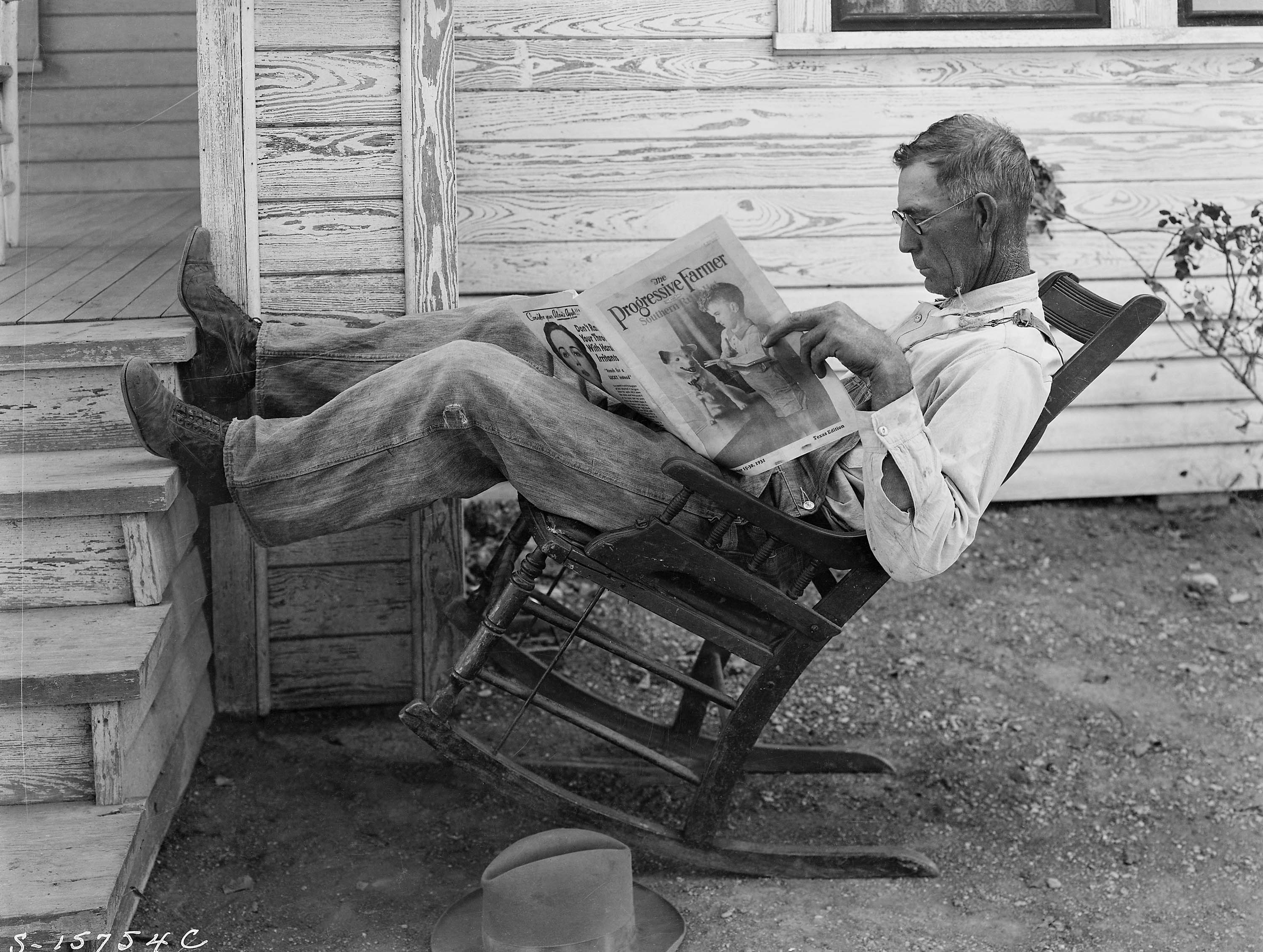
A September 1931 photo of man in Texas lounging in a rocking chair while reading

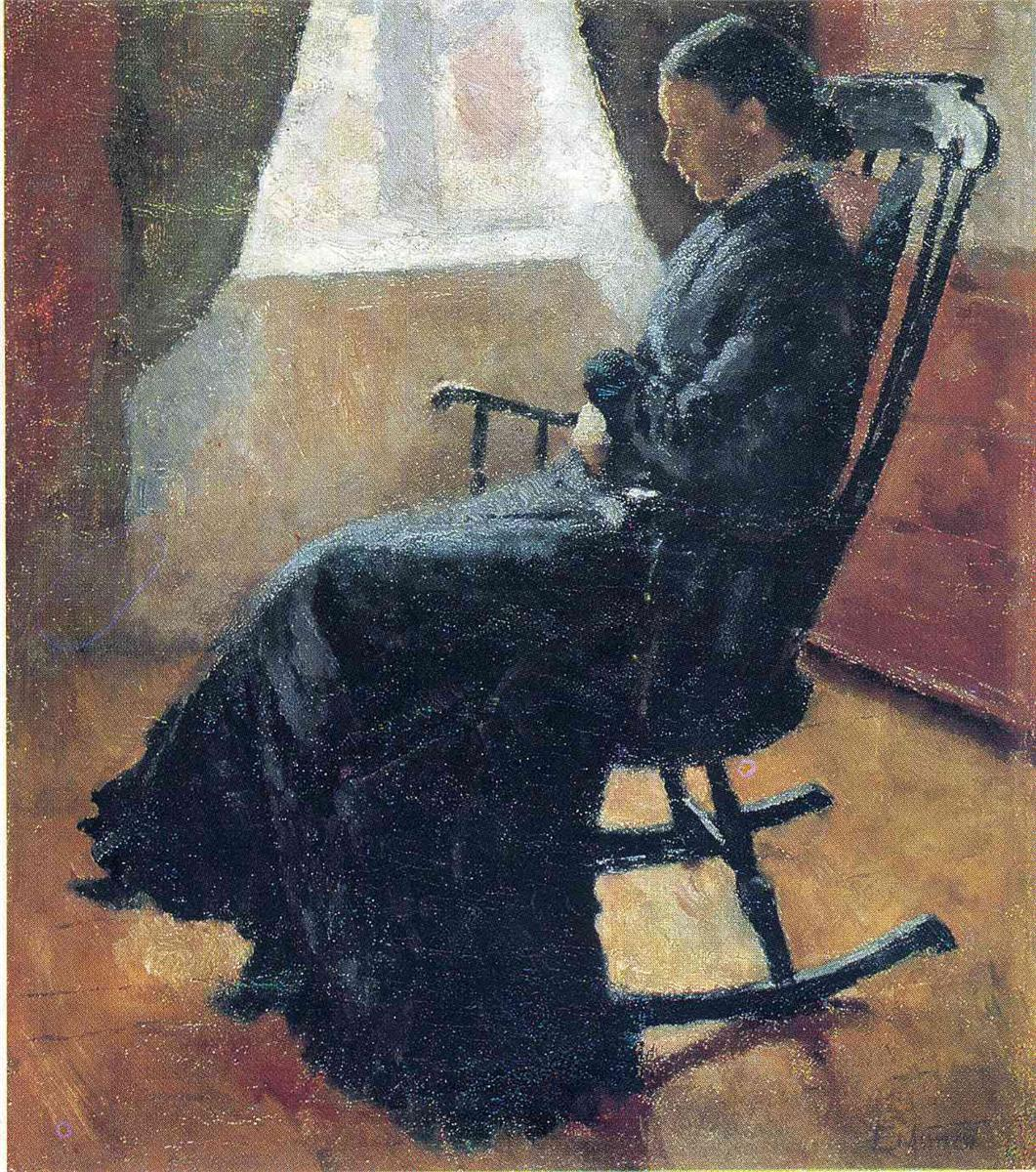
Edvard Munch: Aunt Karen in the Rocking Chair, 1883

Rocking cradles long predate rocking chairs and an example exists from antiquity, found in the ruins of Herculaneum.

Originally used in gardens, rocking chairs were simply ordinary chairs with rockers attached. In 1725, early rocking chairs first appeared in England. Though American inventor Benjamin Franklin is sometimes credited with inventing the rocking chair, historians actually trace the rocking chair's origins to North America during the early 18th century, when Franklin was a child. The production of wicker rocking chairs reached its peak in America during the middle of the 18th century. These wicker rockers, as they were popularly known, were famous for their craftsmanship and creative designs.

During the 1830s, Peter Cooper designed the first steel chair in America which was a rocking chair, and was displayed at the Crystal Palace Exhibition in 1851.

Michael Thonet, a German craftsman, created the first bentwood rocking chair in 1860. This design is distinguished by its graceful shape and its light weight. These rocking chairs were influenced by Greek and Roman designs as well as Renaissance and colonial era artistry.

During the 1920s, however, folding rocking chairs became more popular in the United States and in Europe. They were handy for outdoor activities and travel purposes. By the 1950s, rocking chairs built by Sam Maloof, an American craftsman, became famous for their durability and deluxe appearance. Maloof's rocking chairs are distinguished by their ski-shaped rockers.

== Types of rocking chair ==
=== Peter Cooper ===
Peter Cooper, an American industrialist and inventor, designed an iron-frame chair with a functional, minimalist design radically different from Victorian heavily decorated, ostentatious designs. At that time most rocking chairs had separate rockers fixed to regular chair legs, Cooper's chair used the curve of its frame to ensure the rocking motion. Coopers chair was made of steel or wrought iron with upholstery slung across the frame. Cooper's model was manufactured at R.W. Winfield & Co. in Britain. The firm exhibited examples of the chair at the Great Exhibition of the Works of Industry of all Nations (Crystal Palace Exhibition) in 1851 and the Great London Exposition of 1862.

=== Bentwood ===
Michael Thonet received a patent in 1856 for the process of bentwood manufacturing, when he and his five sons began to produce innovative ‘bentwood’ furniture.

=== Boston ===
Actually made in Connecticut, Boston rockers were traditionally made of oak and pine, painted black, and embellished with fruit and flower designs.

=== Folding ===
Folding rocking chairs were popular starting in the 1870s. They come in a variety of styles, but are recognized by backs designed to fold down to the seat.

=== Wicker ===
Wicker rocking chairs were machine-manufactured rocker armchairs from the early 20th century. These were usually part of a sun parlor set, which included a sofa, side chairs, a table, a planter, and a floor lamp.

=== Pressed back ===
The pressed back rocking chair was part of the American colony revival style that lasted from about 1870-1920. It has a raised design of the wood on the back.

=== Ladder back ===
The ladder back rocking chair has a tall back with horizontal slats.

== See also ==
- Bassinet, another rocking piece of furniture
- Glider (furniture), a chair that rocks via suspension from a four-bar linkage
- "Rockin' Chair" (song) by Hoagy Carmichael
- Swing (seat), the rocking movement comes from suspension
