= Jay Gard =

German artist

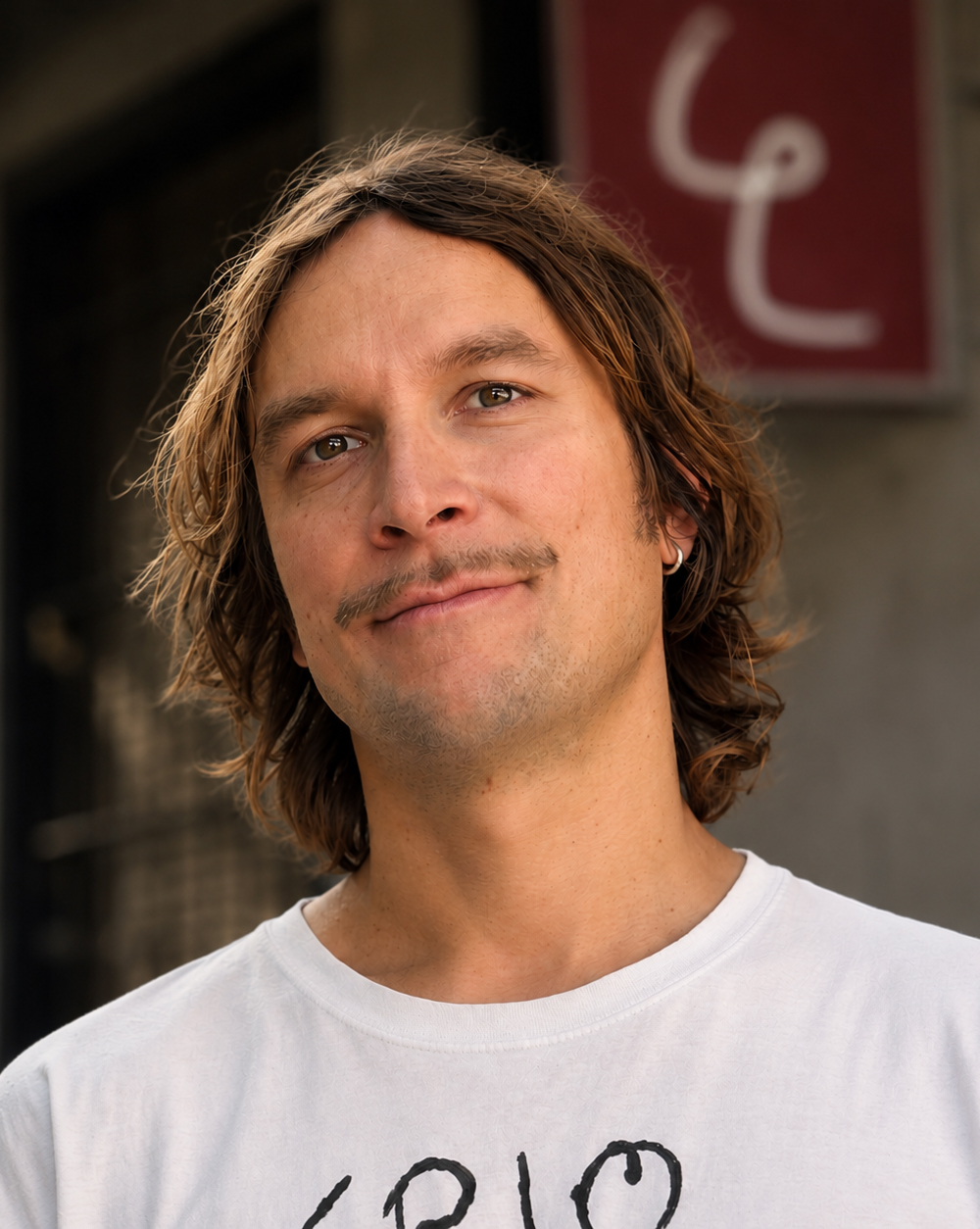
- Born: 1984 (age 41–42); Halle (Saale), East Germany
- Occupation: Artist
- Known for: Sculpture
- Website: https://jaygard.com/

Jay Gard is a German artist. He lives and works in Berlin.

== Life ==
Jay Gard was born in Halle/Saale and raised in Karl-Marx-Stadt (renamed Chemnitz in 1990). He spent his early childhood in the waning years of the German Democratic Republic where his mother worked as a textile designer and his father as a product designer. Gard studied painting and graphics at the Hochschule für Kunst und Design (Burg Giebichenstein) in Halle/Saale. From 2006 to 2008 he worked for the American artist Tom Sachs in New York and the German artist Thomas Demand in Berlin. In 2008 he continued his higher education at the Hochschule für Grafik und Buchkunst in Leipzig (HGB) in Joachim Blank’s Class for Installation and Space. Gard founded the label VEGA-Leipzig in 2010 for which he designed and built various audio-objects. He has lived and worked in Berlin since 2012.

In spring 2019 he presented his first solo museum exhibition "Gabriele" at the Museum Gunzenhauser in Chemnitz. Later that year he received an artist residency of the Bauhaus Foundation at Oskar Schlemmer's Meisterhaus in Dessau to create an artist edition for Thonet of Marcel Breuer's classic ′b9-Hocker′. They were first launched at the opening of the new Bauhaus Museum in Dessau and will be permanently on display.

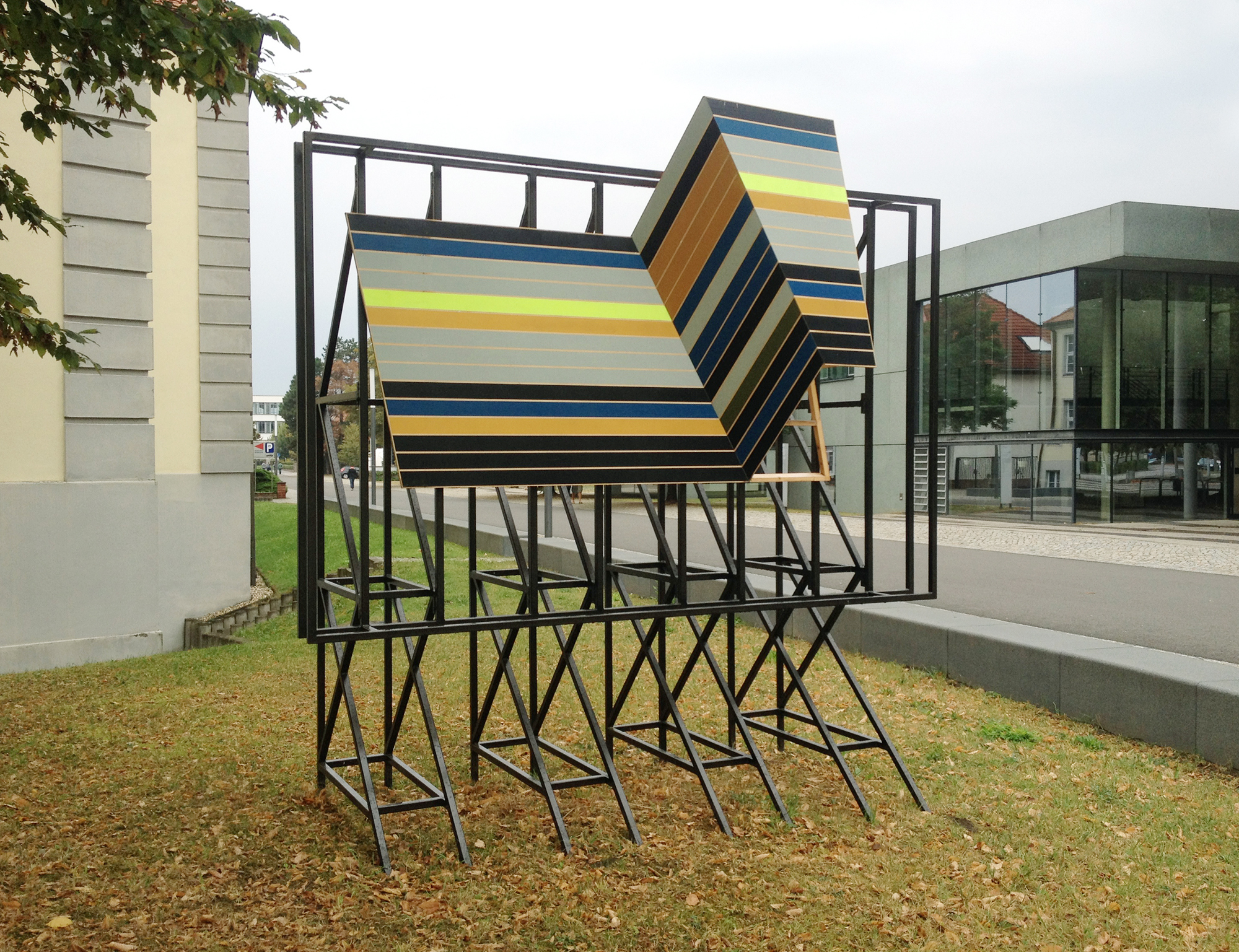
Jay Gard, Deffke Billboard, Signale der Moderne, Bauhaus Dessau, 2016

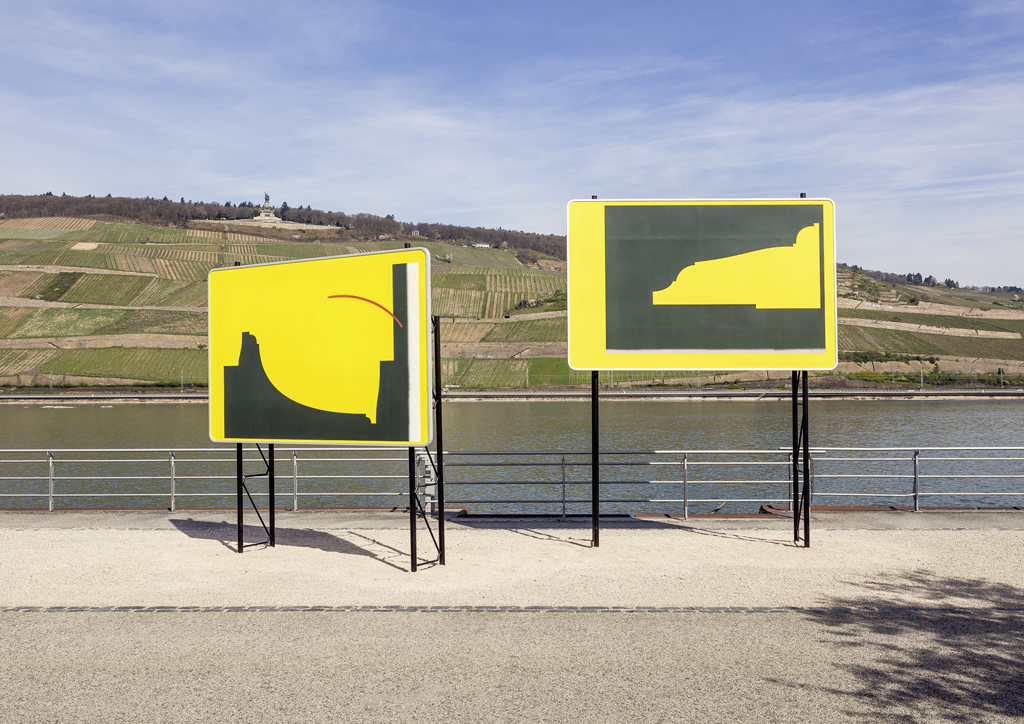
Jay Gard, Touristic Hint, Nah und Fern, Skulpturen-Triennale Bingen, 2017

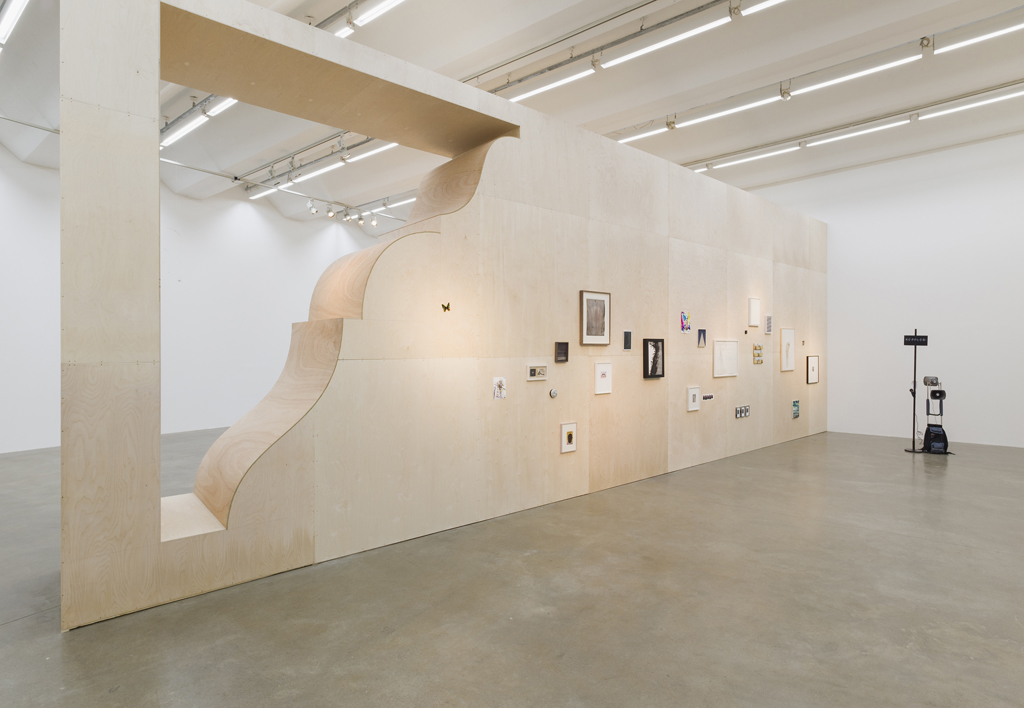
Jay Gard, Berliner Leiste, Small (installation view), Galerie Sexauer, Berlin, 2017

== Work ==
Jay Gard constructs art objects that combine aesthetics and rationality. His works are characterized by strict geometric shapes and conceptual structures. As publicist and curator Paolo Bianchi states in his text ′The Balance of Opposites′: "For Gard, the supporting framework of rationality guarantees the aesthetic autonomy necessary to allow a creative process to become effective in its complexity." They are mostly composed of wood, plywood and steel, and finished with industrial paint. Remnants of the construction process – such as scrub marks, angle and measurement calculations – are often left visible to the viewer.

Gard’s works range from space-filling installations to three-dimensional wall paintings. His pieces cite – sometimes ironically – artistic, cultural and design-related codes which he reinterprets and places in different contexts, stripping them of their original meaning which Frédéric Bußmann describes as "some kind of inflated and perfected recycling of details". The creative process and the artistic moment itself are the central topics of Gard’s work. Since 2016 his work mainly focuses on color schemes and their compositional impact. One of his analytical artistic methods is to extract colors of existing historic or contemporary paintings and arrange them in color wheels of different sizes. The title of the work is usually a reference to the original.

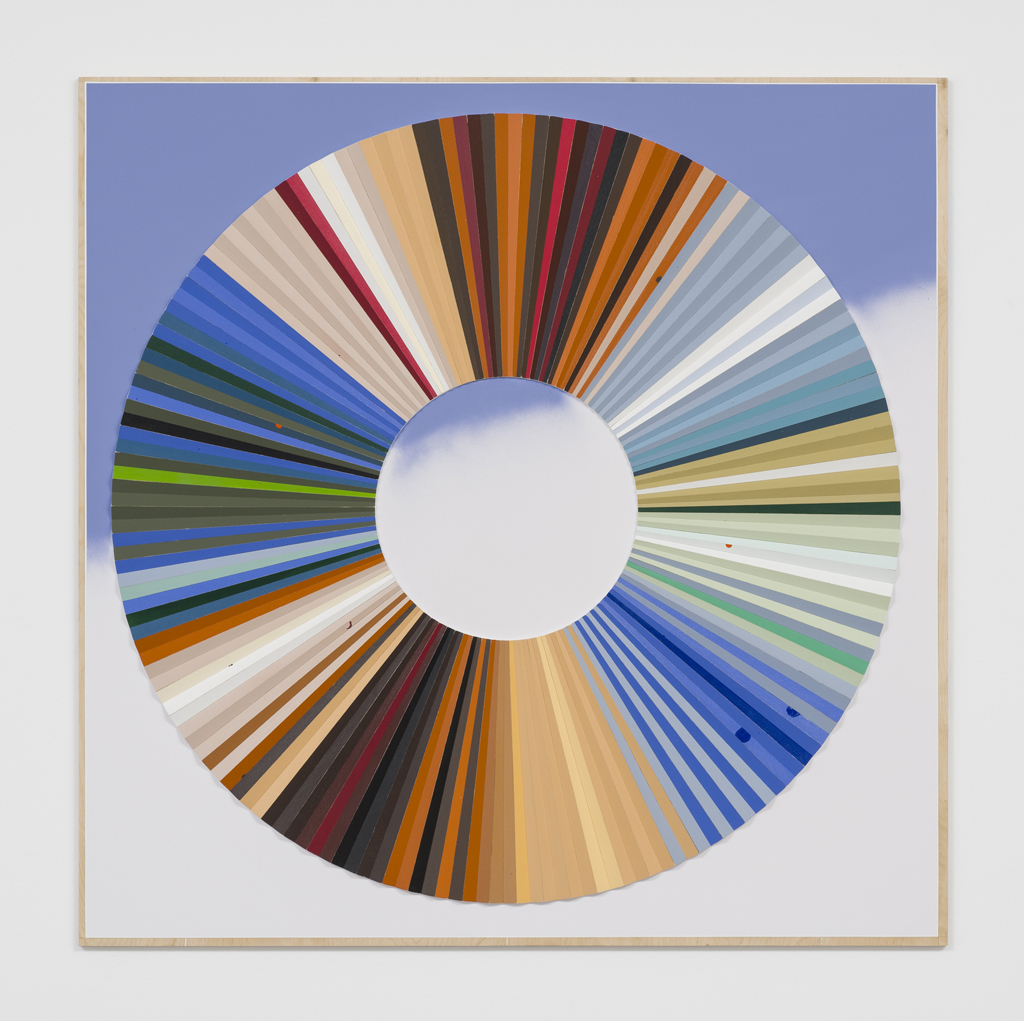
Jay Gard, Farbkreis Cecily (Cecily Brown, Bend Sinister), 2018

== Solo exhibitions (selection) ==
- 2019: Gabriele, Museum Gunzenhauser, Chemnitz, DE
- 2018: Colors, Gether Contemporary, Copenhagen, DK
- 2017: Zeichen unter Zeichen, Sexauer, Berlin, DE
- 2017: It’s the Frame Not the Painting, Jonas Mekas Visual Arts Center, Vilnius, LT
- 2016: making things makes us human, Gether Contemporary, Kopenhagen, DK
- 2015: Wrong History, Sexauer, Berlin, DE
- 2015: Jay Gard, Galerie Oelfrüh, Hamburg, DE
- 2014: Everybody‘s Moving, Galerie B2, Leipzig, DE
- 2013: Jay Gard, Sexauer, Berlin, DE
- 2013: We make it, The Jay Gard Picture Collection, Berlin, DE
- 2011: Universal Cube Fun House, Leipzig, DE
- 2008: Hammertime, UFO Galerie, Halle / Saale, DE
- 2008: Double Gard, Half Gallery, New York, US

== Group exhibitions (selection) ==
- 2018: Ansbach Contemporary, Biennale für zeitgenössische Kunst, Ansbach, DE
- 2018: Ein Turm der Unmoeglichkeiten, König Galerie, Berlin, DE
- 2018: Melting Point, Kunst und Denker, Düsseldorf, DE
- 2017: Nah und Fern, Skulpturen Triennale Bingen, Bingen am Rhein, DE
- 2017: lower color, Botschaft, Uferhallen Wedding, Berlin, DE
- 2017: SMALL – an exploration of miniature, Sexauer, Berlin, DE
- 2016: Signale der Moderne, Stiftung Bauhaus Dessau, Dessau, DE
- 2016: Lithomania, Schaufenster, Berlin, DE
- 2015: Arcadia Unbound, Funkhaus, Berlin, Berlin, DE
- 2015: Spring Exhibition, Museum Charlottenborg, Kopenhagen, DK
- 2014: Booster – Kunst Sound Maschine, Museum Marta Herford, Herford, Herford, DE
- 2012: Neuzugänge zeitgenössischer Kunst im Kunstfonds, Vertretung des Freistaates Sachsen beim Bund, Berlin, DE
- 2011: Woodanfall, Loyal Arts Club, Kassel, DE
- 2010: Pavillon X, Galerie Jakopice, Ljubljana, SLO
- 2010: Blokkade, ABK, Stuttgart, DE
- 2009: Décohérence, Sortie d‘Artistes, Rennes, FR
- 2008: Wore, Jack The Pelican Presents, New York, US

== Videos ==
- 1 December 2013: Sexauer presents: Jay Gard, DE
- 28 October 2015: Sexauer presents: Wrong History, DE
- 28 September 2017: Audioführung at Skulpturen-Triennale Bingen, DE
- 7 January 2018: Sexauer presents: Zeichen Unter Zeichen, DE
