= No. 14 chair =

Chair made by the Thonet chair company

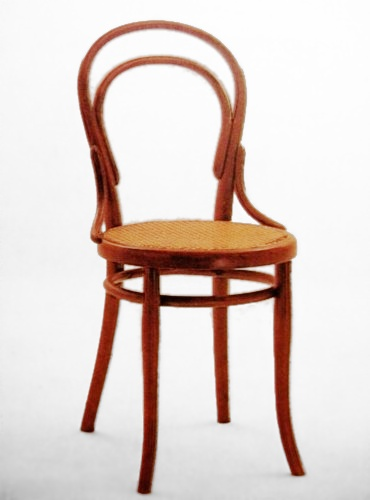
- Designer: Michael Thonet
- Date: 1859
- Made in: Moravia then Austria
- Materials: Wood, steam-bent Beechwood, 10 screws, and 2 nuts
- Style / tradition: Classic

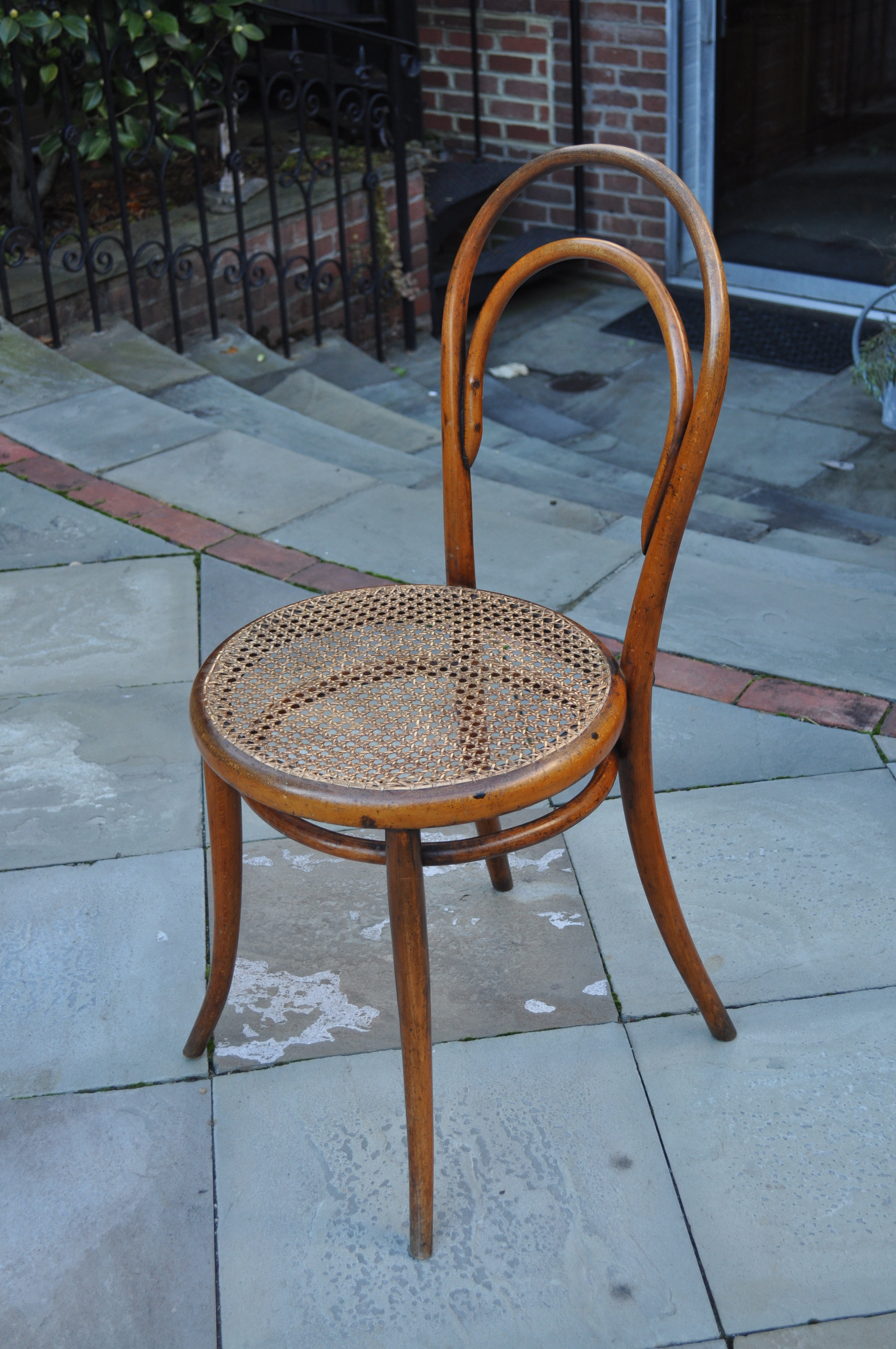
Original version without braces showing the cane seat

The No. 14 chair is the most famous chair made by the Thonet chair company. Also known as the "bistro chair", it was designed in the Austrian Empire by Michael Thonet and introduced in 1859, becoming the world's first mass-produced item of furniture. It is made using bent wood (steam-bending), and the design required years to perfect. With its affordable price and simple design, it became one of the best-selling chairs ever made. Gebrüder Thonet sold 50 million No. 14s between 1859 and 1930, and the company's successor organisations have sold millions more since then. "It represents the best example of a design which has been refined to the point where there is no way to improve it."

Thonet's No. 14 comprises six pieces of steam-bent wood, ten screws, and two nuts. The wooden parts were made by heating beechwood slats to 100 °C (212 °F), pressing them into curved cast-iron moulds, and then drying them at around 70 °C (158 °F) for 20 hours. The chairs could be mass-produced by unskilled workers and disassembled to save space during transportation.

Later chairs, as illustrated here, were made of eight pieces of wood. Two diagonal braces were added between the seat and back to strengthen this hard-worked joint.

The design met a requirement for café-style chairs. The seat was often made of woven cane or palm, because the holes in the seat would let spilt liquid drain off the chair.

Chair No 14 is still produced by Gebrüder Thonet, Vienna, by Ton, and by Thonet (as 214).

== Design classic ==
The No. 14 chair is widely regarded as a design classic. It earned a gold medal when it was shown at the 1867 World Exposition in Paris. It has been praised by many designers and architects, including Le Corbusier, who said, "Never was a better and more elegant design and a more precisely crafted and practical item created."

== Redesign ==
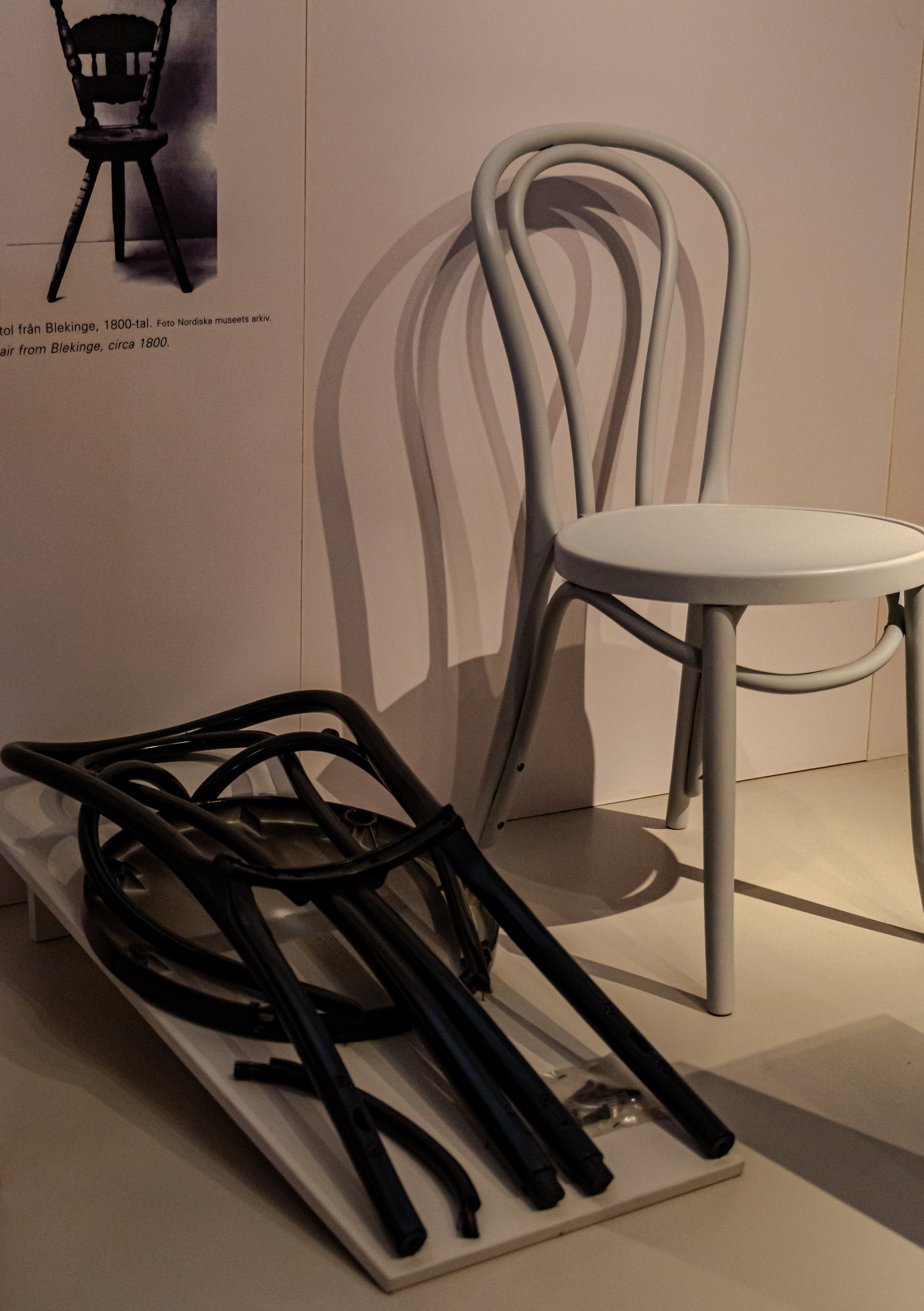
A 1961 plastic-composite knock-off

As the original design is now in the public domain, there have been many new versions. In 1961, a plastic version was made by IKEA. In 2009, the chair was redesigned by James Irvine, an English designer, and retailed from Muji, a Japanese company. Roland Ohnacker, managing director of Thonet, stated that the aim was "to help 18 to 35 year-olds enter the Thonet brand world."
