= Betty Holliday =

American painter

- Born: Elizabeth Gertrude Holliday; May 23, 1925; Port Washington, New York
- Died: April 3, 2011 (aged 85); Port Washington, New York
- Known for: Painting, drawing
- Movement: Abstract Expressionism

Elizabeth Gertrude Holliday (23 May 1925—3 April 2011), known professionally as Betty Holliday and Betty Holliday Deckoff, was an American visual artist and educator who was active on Long Island, New York, and in New York City. Her most well-known works are large figurative paintings and drawings. Her early paintings were dominated by color, as she was trained when Abstract Expressionism was the dominant American art movement; later she became interested in photography and, as a result, experimented in "decolorizing" her paintings and drawings.

== Early life, education, and employment ==
Betty Holliday was the youngest daughter of Gertrude Holliday and George Alvin Holliday (1887–1970); she had one sister, Priscilla. She earned a BA in Art History at Barnard College (1945), studied painting and drawing at the Art Students League of New York (1942–47), and earned an MA in Art History at Radcliffe College (1950), now fully merged with Harvard University.

After completing her formal education, Holliday worked as an editorial associate for ARTnews (1950–55), which familiarized her with the works of contemporary artists. This access to the art scene proved instrumental in her recruitment of visiting artists for the Cumberland Center for Continuing Education, the adult education program at the Great Neck School District, where Holliday was a well-respected teacher from 1955 until 1984. She also taught privately and many of her students became professional artists, including Shirley Gorelick, Deborah Katz, Peter Galasso, and Sigrid Somers.

== Abstract Expressionism ==
Holliday began to explore nonobjectivity in the late 1950s and early 1960s, but her figural abstractions attracted the earliest published critical attention. My Father (1960), a monumental abstraction of George Alvin Holliday seated in a chair, was prominently reproduced in Art in America to illustrate how the nontraditional, unsymbolic figurative works of "fledgling artists" attested to the flexibility of abstraction and representation. Even in her earliest works, Holliday was able to "reveal the truth of the figure which is just as well expressed by its stance, its total gesture, as by its individual features" through the language of Abstract Expressionism. Her heavy, bold, interpenetrating, and in some cases obliterating, gestural strokes of white, gray, black, and brown invited comparisons to Franz Kline and Willem de Kooning. A few years later, she asserted her expressive independence in a group of paintings and drawings on the theme of figures in striped clothing against a green backdrop, including In the Garden (1964) and On the Grass III (1965), both large canvases. Holliday's command of compositional space and structure, which was already evident in My Father, became more nuanced and her forms more decentralized; her figures were also more enigmatic. As noted by one reviewer, Holliday surpassed "factual representation" to achieve "an expressiveness and concern for human meaning" through both the subject and her handling of it.

== Photography ==
Holliday began to explore photography as an alternative expressive medium in 1967 and 1968, when she focused almost solely on her photographic experiments in "decoloration," which led her to create a number of photo-sculptures, including Vertical Broom, Horizontal Broom, and The Farragut Stairs (all 1968). Each features a single photograph, with its abundant repetitions affixed to a large construction, resulting in a visually stimulating, rhythmic arrangement of black and white elements. A similar synthesis of form and content is found in Model for an Improbable Billboard (1967–69), a photo-sculpture featuring the American poet Marianne Moore, who was photographed by Holliday during a public reading at the Loeb Student Center at New York University in 1967.

== Later works ==
Around 1972, Holliday reintroduced some limited color and returned to painting large figures, characterized by bold brushstrokes and simple, direct compositions. At this time of renewed emphasis on figurative painting, Holliday was invited to contribute to a feminist collaborative installation called The Sister Chapel, which was conceived by her former student, Ilise Greenstein, and came to dominate Holliday's work for almost two years. Although Holliday vacillated when choosing her subject for the installation, she eventually settled on Marianne Moore, recalling her "steel-sharp wit disguised as reticent gentility—Socrates hiding out in the person of the local librarian." Holliday's fascination with Moore led to the creation of countless works. When The Sister Chapel premiered in 1978, one reviewer reported that Holliday had executed three hundred drawings and five full-sized paintings of Marianne Moore. Holliday’s final painting, Marianne Moore (1977), was the outcome of numerous and evolving studies, which included drawings of the head, umbrella, and a bentwood rocker of a type designed by Michael Thonet. When The Sister Chapel was first shown, Marianne Moore was identified by one reviewer as "probably the most successful painting—as a painting—in the chapel."

In the early 1980s, Holliday's attention shifted to sunflowers and dynamic human figures, both of which were executed on a large scale, usually in the form of drawings. In these works, all of her figures were more energetic than in her earlier, more static paintings. The Flute and Raised Ukelele were among the drawings of "a swirling, spinning female form, engulfed in sweeping lines that define a cape or scarf, while holding aloft a flute or ukelele. The entire effect is one of motion, of energy, of playfulness." At the time, Holliday’s monumental and expressive figures were described by a reviewer in The New York Times as "a body of work that restates a classic tradition with marked originality."

Holliday's final works were large-scale drawings, including The Judgment of Paris (1990), which was described by Helen Harrison as "a witty, geriatric takeoff on the mythological encounter."
