= Thonet =

Thonet is a surname. Notable people with the surname include:

- Anne Bonnet, née Thonet (1908–1960), Belgian painter
- Michael Thonet (1796–1871), German–Austrian cabinet maker
  - Gebrüder Thonet, furniture manufacturer founded by Michael Thonet
