= Glider (furniture) =

Type of rocking chair that moves as a swing seat

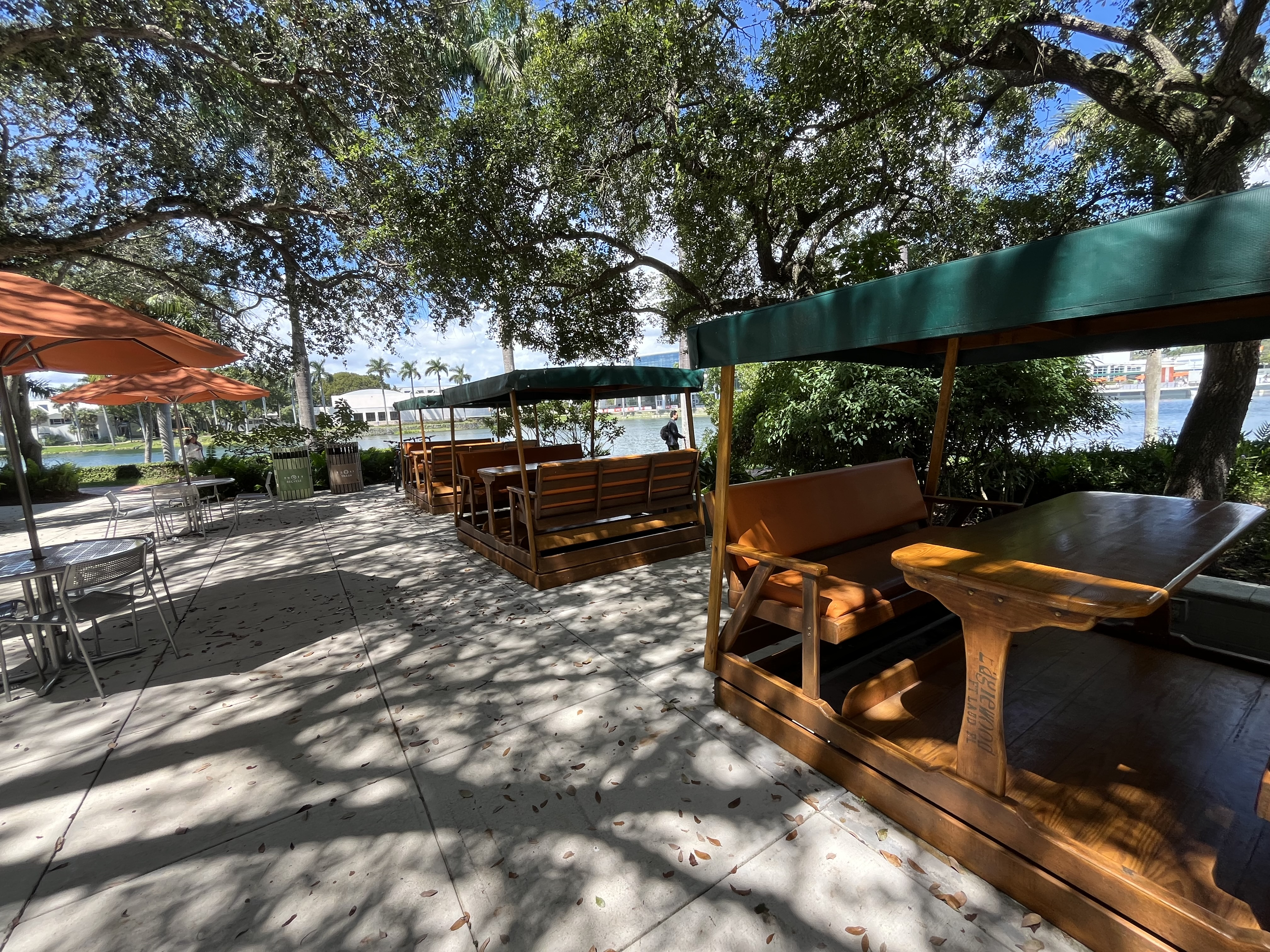
Gliders from University of Miami

A glider or platform rocker is a type of rocking chair that moves as a swing seat, where the entire frame consists of a seat attached to the base by means of a double-rocker four-bar linkage. The non-parallel suspension arms of the linkage cause the chair to simulate a rocking-chair motion as it swings back and forth.

Gliders are used as alternatives to porch swings, and are also popular as nursery furnishing for assisting parents in feeding newborn babies. Because pinch points are moved away from the floor, a glider is marginally safer than rocking chairs for pets and toddlers.

== History ==
Early patents described different mechanisms for glider chairs, such as rails and four-bar linkages supported by springs. Patents using a swinging seat suspended from a four-bar linkage as well as the name glider first appeared in 1939, and this is now the general configuration used by most glider chairs.

In the southern United States, porch gliders were referred to as divans. Especially popular was the "basket weave" pattern in the hot non-air-conditioned South of the 1950s and 1960s.

== Manufacturers ==
The primary glider manufacturers in North America are Canadian companies Dutailier and Shermag.
