= Panton Chair =

Plastic chair designed by Verner Panton

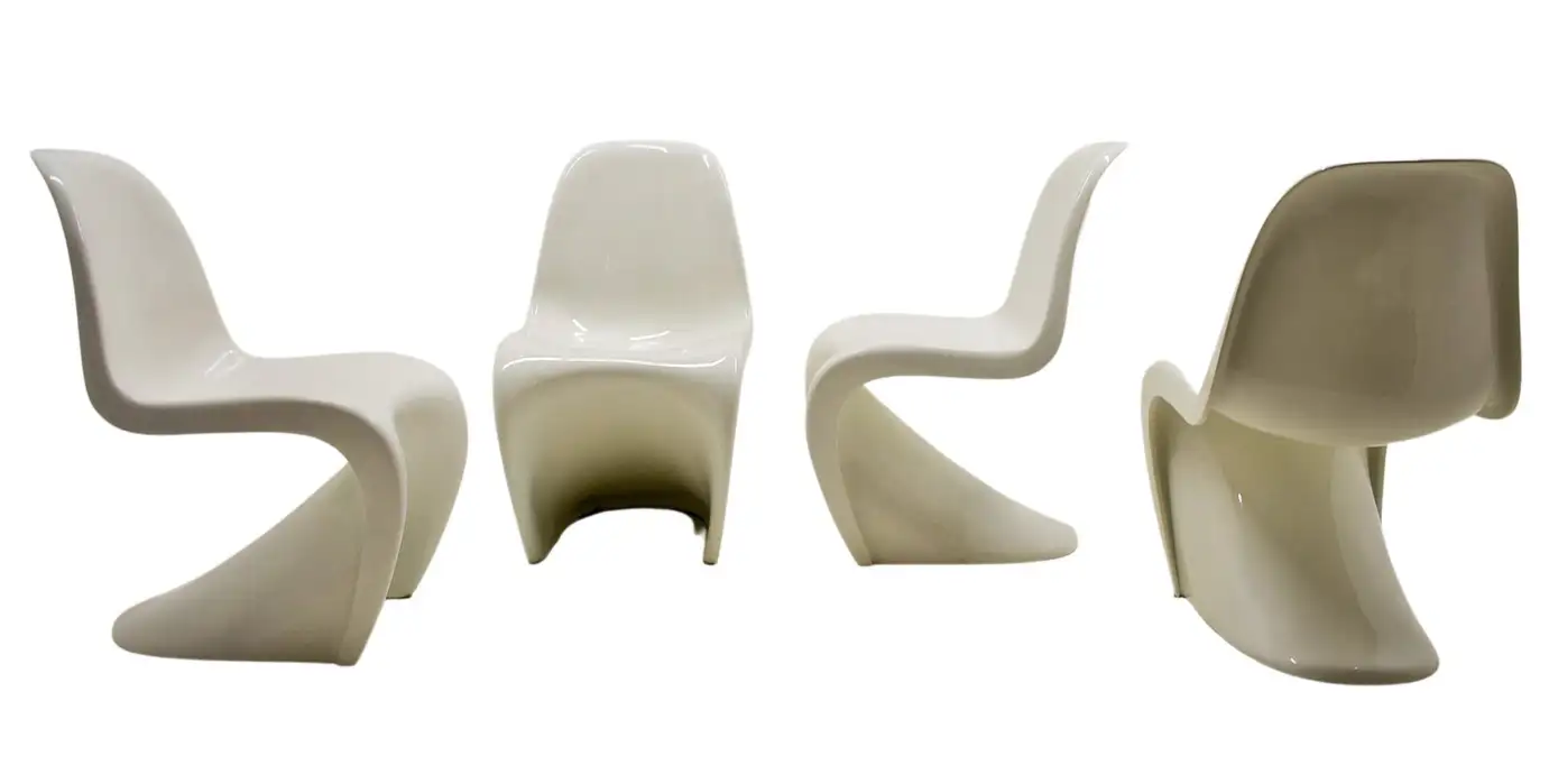
- Panton chair
- Designer: Verner Panton (Denmark)
- Date: 1967
- Materials: Moulded plastic
- Style / tradition: Modernist

The Panton Chair (Danish: Pantonstolen) is an S-shaped plastic chair created by the Danish designer Verner Panton in the 1960s. The world's first moulded plastic chair, it is considered to be one of the masterpieces of Danish design. The chair was included in the 2006 Danish Culture Canon.

== History ==
The idea of designing a stackable plastic chair was first expressed by the German architect and designer Ludwig Mies van der Rohe before the Second World War. From the early 1950s, Panton had also dreamed of creating a stackable, cantilevered plastic chair all in one piece. It is said he had been inspired in particular by a neatly stacked pile of plastic buckets. In 1956, he designed the S Chair, which can be considered a forerunner of the Panton Chair. He saw it as an item of furniture in which the back, seat, and legs were made of a continuous piece. It was first produced in 1965.

Panton made a series of sketches and design drawings for the Panton Chair in the 1950s. In 1960, he created his first model, a plaster-cast, in collaboration with Dansk Akrylteknik. In the mid-1960s, he met Willi Fehlbaum from the furniture manufacturer Vitra who, unlike many other producers, was fascinated with the drawings of his legless chair in plastic rather than wood, the favoured material of the times. Working closely with Fehlbaum, Panton produced a cold-pressed model using polyester strengthened with fibreglass. For the first time, an entire chair had been designed as a single piece, without any legs. It became known as a free swinger. The first rather heavy model, which required substantial finishing work, was subsequently improved and adapted to industrial production using thermoplastic polystyrene, which led to a marked reduction in cost. In 1968, Vitra initiated serial production of the final version, which was sold by the Herman Miller Furniture Company. The material used was Baydur, a high-resilience polyurethane foam produced by Bayer in Leverkusen, Germany. It was offered in several colors.

In 1979, however, production was halted as it became apparent that polystyrene was not sufficiently durable and began to look shabby over time. Four years later, the model was again produced as the Panton Chair Classic, this time in the rather more expensive polyurethane structural foam. Finally, in 1999, Vitra used polypropylene for manufacturing the Panton Plastic Chair in a variety of colors.

== Exotic appeal ==
Panton was a contributor to the development of sleek new styles reflecting the "Space Age" of the 1960s, which became known as Pop Art. The Panton Chair, in particular, was renowned for its sleek and curvaceous design. When it was unveiled in the Danish design journal Mobilia in 1967, it caused a sensation. In 1970, it was featured in the British fashion magazine Nova with a sequence of shots illustrating "How to undress in front of your husband". Perhaps the chair's most famous appearance was in January 1995, when it was featured on the cover of the British edition of Vogue. The photograph by Nick Knight also included a naked Kate Moss.

The Panton Chair's S-shaped design continues to be popular today and has been reimagined in exotic materials such as rattan, bamboo, and even banana leaf.

== Museum collections ==
Over the years, the Panton Chair, initially known as Panton's S Chair, has been widely exhibited in Denmark and abroad. It currently forms part of the permanent collections of some of the world's most famous design museums, including New York's Museum of Modern Art, London's Design Museum, Berlin's German Historical Museum, and Copenhagen's Danish Museum of Art & Design.

== See also ==
- Danish modern
