= James Irvine (designer) =

British designer (1958–2013)

- Alma mater: Kingston University; Royal College of Art
- Spouse(s): Marialaura Rossiello Irvine
- Awards: Royal Designers for Industry (2004)
- Website: studio-irvine.com

James Irvine RDI (17 July 1958 London, England– 18 February 2013 Milan, Italy) was a British industrial designer who created furniture and product designs for many well known companies and brands such as Artemide, B&B Italia, Cappellini, Foscarini, Ikea, Magis, Muji, Thonet, and WMF. He once described the product designer's job as “the work of an unknown hero.”

== Early life and education ==
Irvine was the son of the architect and designer Alan Irvine and his first wife, Betty. He obtained his bachelor's degree in industrial design from the Kingston Polytechnic (now University) alongside fellow designers Jasper Morrison and Michael Young. He subsequently earned a master's degree from the Royal College of Art, and then moved to Milan to work for Olivetti in 1984. He also worked for one year at the Toshiba Design Center in Tokyo.

== Work and career ==
In 1988 Irvine opened a design studio in Milan, initially collaborating with Cappellini and SCP. He also worked with Ettore Sottsass and became a partner at Sottsass Associati. In 1999 he designed the Mercedes-Benz O530 Citaro bus for the city of Hannover and proposed an accompanying design for the city's bus shelters in preparation for Expo 2000.

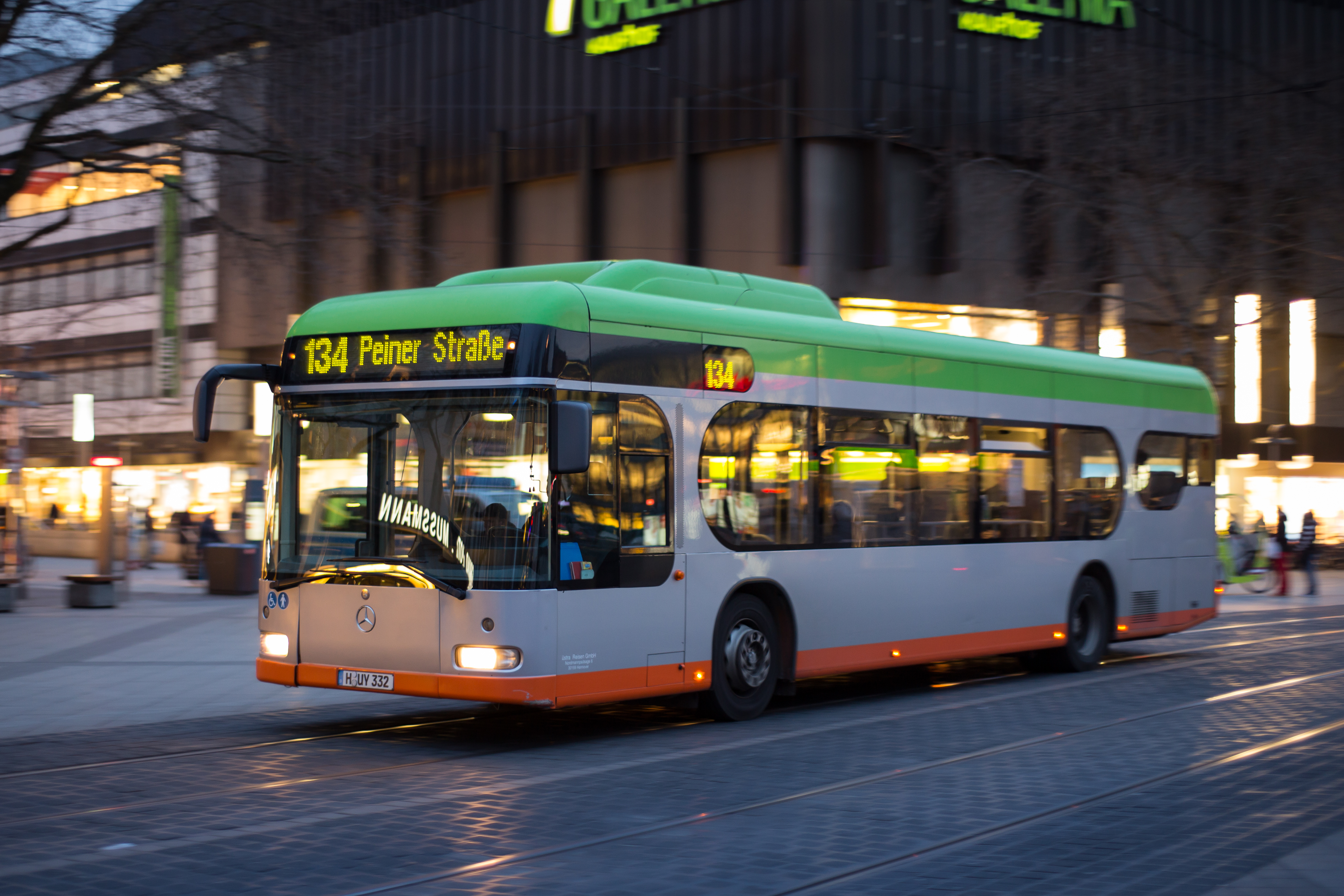
Mercedes-Benz Citaro, Hannover, Germany

He was a professor of industrial design at the Karlsruhe University of Arts and Design.

In 2004 he was appointed Royal Designer for Industry (RDI).

In 2006 his A 660 Bentwood chair for Thonet received the iF Design Award

In 2007 he was awarded an Honorary Doctorate in Design form Kingston University.

In 2010 his S 123 H barstool for Thonet received the iF Design Award

In 2013 Irvine's "Juno" chair for Arper received both the Design Guild Mark Award and the iF Design Award.

== Death and legacy ==
Irvine died of pneumonia in 2013 at the age of 54 and is buried at the Maggiore cemetery in Milan. He is survived by his wife, designer Maria Laura Rossiello Irvine, and two sons Giacomo and Giorgio.

In 2015 Phaidon Press published a monograph about his work and life with contributions from many of his collaborators and contemporaries including: designers Michele De Lucchi, George Sowden, Stefano Giovannoni, Thomas Sandell, Jasper Morrison, Konstantin Grcic, Naoto Fukasawa, Alberto Meda and Marc Newson; design impresario Giulio Cappellini; design critics Deyan Sudjic and Francesca Picchi. With the publication of the book, the Triennale Design Museum hosted a tribute to Irvine titled "Stories about James" to celebrate the life and work of the designer.

His eponymous company "Studio James Irvine" continues under the guidance of his wife, the architect and Art Director Marialaura Rossiello Irvine.

== Collaborations with notable brands ==
Irvine worked with some of the most prestigious design-oriented companies, including:

- Thonet: He designed several iconic pieces, including the S 123 barstool, merging modern materials with Thonet’s historic craftsmanship.
- Muji: Collaborated on minimalist yet functional products reflecting the brand’s ethos.
- Fritz Hansen: Created furniture pieces that balanced comfort with sleek, contemporary lines.
- Artemide: Designed lighting solutions that embodied simplicity and practicality.
- Olivetti: Worked on innovative office equipment designs.
- Mercedes-Benz buses: Focused on ergonomics and practicality while maintaining visual appeal.

Irvine also served as creative director for Thonet from 2007 until his passing, where he redefined the company’s design language while honoring its legacy of bentwood furniture.

== See also ==
- GlassLab at the Corning Museum of Glass

== Publications ==
- Picchi F, Morrison J, Cappellini G, Rossiello M, et al. (2015). James Irvine. London: Phaidon Press. ISBN 9780714868967.
- Charlotte, Fiell (2001). Designing the 21st Century. Cologne: Taschen. ISBN 978-3-8228-4803-6. OCLC 41423606.
