= Verner Panton =

Danish furniture designer (1926–1998)

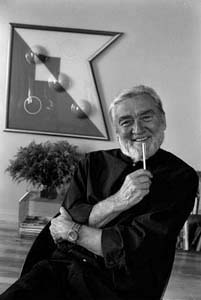
- Panton photographed by Erling Mandelmann
- Born: 13 February 1926; Gamtofte, Denmark
- Died: 5 September 1998 (aged 72); Copenhagen, Denmark
- Occupation: Architect

Verner Panton (13 February 1926 – 5 September 1998) is considered one of Denmark's most influential 20th-century furniture and interior designers. During his career, he created innovative and futuristic designs in a variety of materials, especially plastics, and in vibrant and exotic colors. His style was very "1960s" but regained popularity at the end of the 20th century. As of 2004, Panton's best-known furniture models are still in production (at Vitra, among others).

== Biography ==
Panton was already an experienced artist in Odense when he went to study architecture at the Royal Danish Academy of Art (Det Kongelige Danske Kunstakademi) in Copenhagen, graduating in 1951. During the first two years of his career, 1950–1952, he worked at the architectural practice of Arne Jacobsen, another Danish architect and furniture designer. Panton turned out to be an "enfant terrible" and he started his own design and architectural office. He became well known for his innovative architectural proposals, including a collapsible house (1955), the Cardboard House and the Plastic House (1960). Near the end of the 1950s, his chair designs became much more unconventional, with no legs or discernible back. In 1960 Panton was the designer of the very first single-form injection-moulded plastic chair. The Stacking chair or S chair was mass-produced and became the most famous of his designs derived from organic shapes echoing curves of the human body – in this case the tongue.

In the late 1960s and early 1970s, Verner Panton experimented with designing entire environments: radical and psychedelic interiors that were an ensemble of his curved furniture, wall upholstering, textiles and lighting. He is perhaps best known for a series of interior designs for Bayer's yearly product exhibition, held aboard excursion boats.

== Career ==
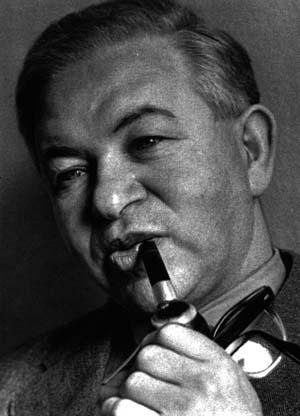
Arne Jacobsen, Panton's mentor

From 1950 to 1952, Verner Panton worked for the architect Arne Jacobsen, who became another important mentor. While at Jacobsen's office, Panton worked primarily in furniture design — specifically, the development of the ‘Ant’ chair. Following his employment with Jacobsen, Panton took a number of extensive trips throughout Europe over the course of three years. During this time, he establishes a number of international contacts with design colleagues, manufacturers, and dealers. From this, Panton is given a large number of architectural and furniture designs including the Bachelor Chair and Tivoli Chair commissioned by prestigious Danish furniture manufacturer Fritz Hansen in 1955.

In the mid-Fifties Verner Panton for the first time occupied himself with the idea of a chair made from one single element. In 1956 the Neue Gemeinschaft für Wohnkultur (WK-Möbel) organized a competition in which Panton participated. His entry was an entire furniture collection, which also included a stackable chair in which the seat and backrest formed a single unit. This is the project from which the so-called 'S-Chair' is derived. The competition entry itself was not successful, with his designs failing to win a prize. In 1957, a prefabricated weekend house is produced as a small series called the All Round House.

In 1958, Panton redesigned his parents’ inn, Kom-igen in the Langesø Park on the island of Fünen, for which he also designed the Cone Chair. The Kom-igen inn was one of Panton's first major commissions. Panton designed the interior as well as a one-floor extension with a roof terrace. He used five different shades of red for the interior to give it warmth while including dark colors for the table linens. Panton developed a flexible system made of fabrics with geometrical patterns to hang from the ceiling to divide up the room. From this, began the start of the cooperation with the Danish firms of Plus-Linje (Cone Chair series furniture), Unika Væv (textiles) and Louis Poulsen (lighting).

Panton designed the Astoria Hotel restaurant in Trondheim, Norway in 1960 which included the entry area with the cloakroom, the day restaurant with the wintergarten, an evening restaurant with dance floor as well as a self-service restaurant. Panton used textile design for floors, walls and ceilings in order to give the room a uniform image. The chairs were various versions of the cone chairs. During this time, Panton also designs the first inflatable seating elements made of transparent plastic in furniture history.

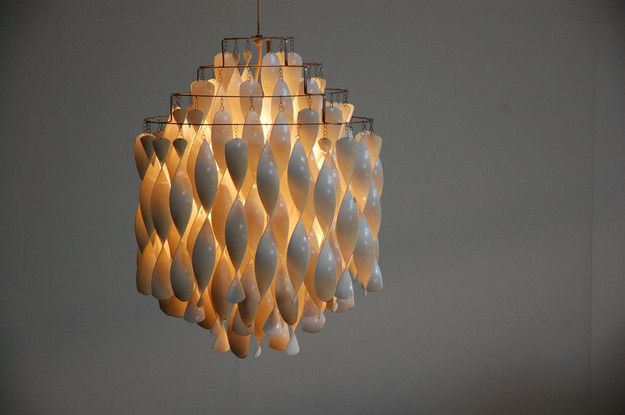
Spiral lamp by Verner Panton

In 1961, Panton presents his furniture, textiles and lamps in the legendary black book of the design magazine Mobilia and in the Pfister furniture showrooms in Zurich. The Shell Lamps are first presented on Lüber's stand in Frankfurt in 1964. During the International Furniture Fair in Cologne, the Flying Chairs are the absolute sensation. In 1965, Thonet produced the S-Chair (Model 275) by Panton which became the first cantilever chair made of molded plywood. This stackable chair was made of plywood which the edge of the seat was slightly tilted upwards. There are two different versions of the S Chair: Model 275 and Model 276. In 1965/66, the design of a modular furniture system made of foam plastic sections, which is manufactured from 1967 by Kill, Metzeler and sold by the Kaufhof chain. The Danish design magazine Mobilia presented the Panton Chair to the public for the first time in 1967. Design of the exhibition on the Dralon ship (later renamed Visiona 0) for Bayer on the occasion of the Cologne Furniture Fair. The Flower Pot lamp is produced. Design for the offices of the Spiegel publishing house. The Living Tower is presented at a joint exhibition with Charles Eames, Joe Colombo and others at the Louvre in Paris. For the Spiegel Publishing House, which moved into the modernized premises in 1969 in Hamburg's Ost-West Street, Panton designed the entrance area with courtyard and lobby, the canteen and the bar areas, the swimming pool for the employees in the basement of the building, the rooms for the editorial conferences and the lounges, as well as the colour schemes for the hallways of the administration or editorial highrise buildings. Design of the Visiona 2 (1970) exhibition for Bayer on the occasion of the Cologne Furniture Fair, where the first Mira X collection is also on show. Redesign of the Varna Restaurant, Arhus DK

=== Timeline ===
- 1974 – Design of the Gruner & Jahr Publishing House offices in Hamburg.
- 1977 – Fritz Hansen produces the System 1-2-3 seating programme.
- 1978 – Louis Poulsen launches the VP Europa lighting range.
- 1978 – Colour and decoration concept of the passage to the underground parking lot at the University Hospital in Basel.
- 1984 – The Circus Building in Copenhagen is renovated on the basis of a colour design by Panton.
- 1990 – The Panton Chair is relaunched by Vitra, which is the occasion for famous designer colleagues to present their Hommage à Panton.
- 1994 – For Ikea he designs the Vilbert Chair.
- 1995 – Start of the collaboration with VS-Möbel.
- 1995/96 – On the occasion of the Olympic Summer Games in Atlanta, Panton designed a Swatch Art Clock Tower in 1995. The tower was first set up on the lake in Lausanne in 1996. It consists of 63 individual, colored rings and a large Swatch clock in the middle. Later, in summer 1996, it was exhibited in the Olympic Museum in Lausanne with 2 shortened floors.
- 1996 – Panton designs a colour space installation Farbräume for Gallerie Littmann in Basel.
- 1997 – Panton receives a commission to design the Erco offices in London.
- 1998 – Exhibition Light and Colour, the last exhibition to be designed by Panton, opens at the Trapholt Museum in Kolding on 17 September 1998.

== Projects ==
=== Astoria Hotel and restaurant in Trondheim, Norway ===
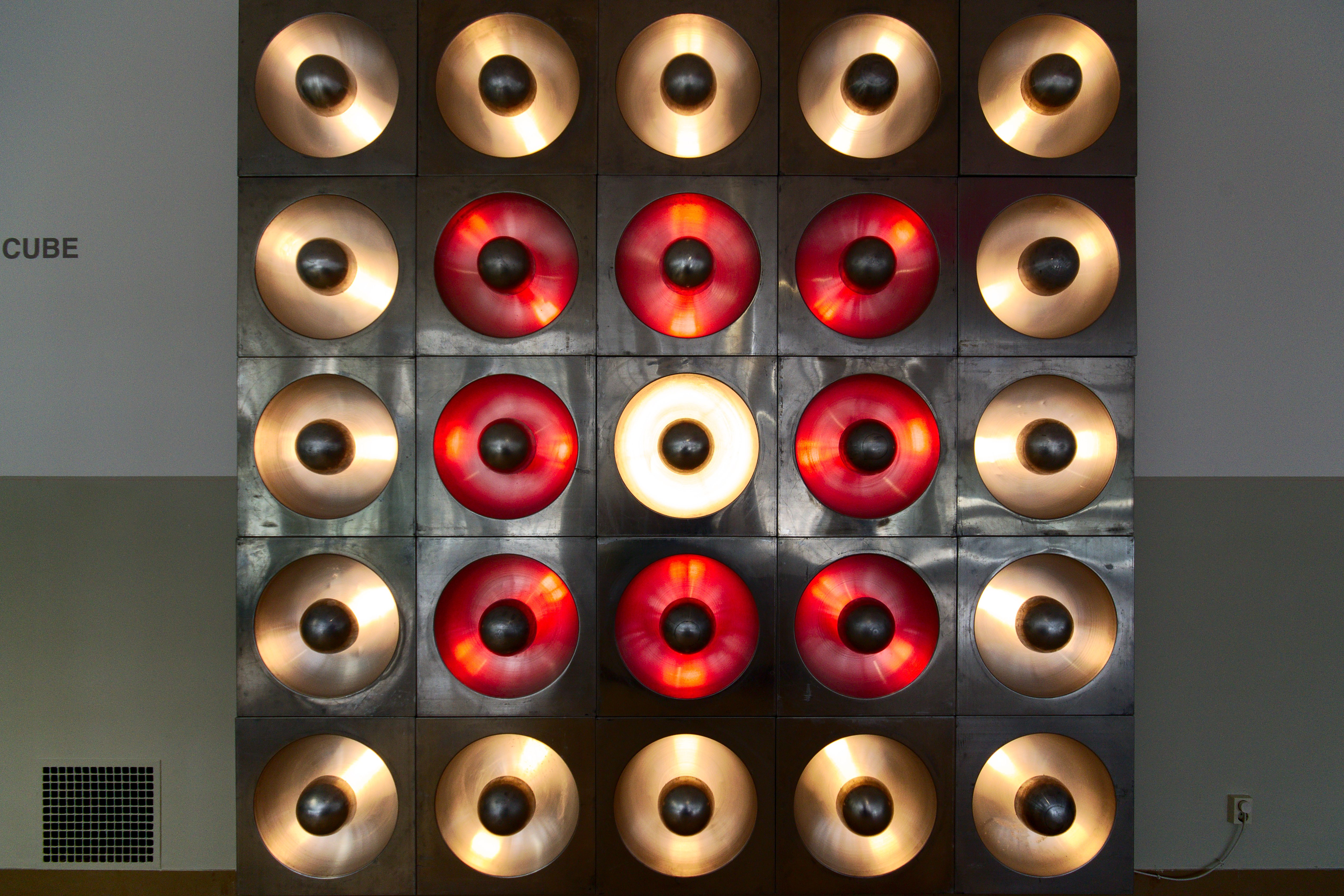
Psychedelic environment design in Astoria Hotel, designed by Verner Panton

The design of the Hotel and Restaurant Astoria in Trondheim included the entry area with the cloakroom, the day restaurant with the wintergarten, an evening restaurant with dance floor as well as a self-service restaurant. Panton used the textile design Geometry I to IV for floors, walls and ceilings in order to give the room a uniform image. The chairs are various versions of the cone chairs. The chairs grouped around the tables and the Topan lights work together to divide the large room into individual seating areas with an intimate note.

=== Visiona I & Visiona II ===
From the end of the Sixties to the mid-Seventies Bayer corporation hired a Rhine excursion steamer during every Cologne furniture fair and commissioned a well-known designer to transform it into a temporary showroom. The main purpose was the promotion of various synthetics used in home furnishings. Bayer's Dralon synthetic fibre and its applications in the field of home textiles played a prominent part in the exhibition. As a result, the showroom was initially called the 'Dralon ship', until at Panton's suggestion it came to be known from 1969 as 'Visiona'. Panton, who was commissioned to design the ship in 1968, found ways from the very beginning to get round any excessive restriction to the field of textiles. By integrating furniture and lighting in his presentation he created atmospherically dense spaces in which colour and light played a dominant role. As early as the Visiona 0 exhibition Panton created experimental interior landscapes in which he was able to freely implement and demonstrate his design ideas, which were often interpreted as utopian. As a result, the 'Dralon ship' caused a sensation among visitors well beyond narrow specialist circles.

Verner Panton was commissioned no less than twice to design this exhibition, entitled 'Visiona'. The 1970 'Visona 2' exhibition showed the Fantasy Landscape which was created in this environment. The resulting room installation consisting of vibrant colours and organic forms is one of the principal highlights of Panton's work. In terms of design history this installation is regarded as one of the major spatial designs of the second half of the twentieth century.

The fireworks which Panton lit with his studio within a preparation time of only a few months for 'Visiona 2' is expressed not only in the room designs in the exhibition ship, but also in the range of furniture, lighting, wall coverings and textiles developed specially for this presentation. Some of these were adapted and went into series production later.

=== Spiegel Publishing House ===
The furnishing of the Spiegel Publishing house buildings in Hamburg count among the most outstanding examples of Panton's interior designs and are some of the few that still exist, at least in part. For the famous news magazine which moved into the modernized premises in 1969 in Hamburg's Ost-West Street, Panton designed the entrance area with courtyard and lobby, the canteen and the bar areas, the swimming pool for the employees in the basement of the building, the rooms for the editorial conferences and the lounges, as well as the color schemes for the hallways of the administration or editorial high-rise buildings. Here again the color schemes became a major design element, providing Panton's typical fusion of room design. All designs were his own – lamps, textiles and wall claddings, only the furniture had to be ordered from Knoll International according to his contracts. The specially designed mirror lighting used on walls and ceilings was of major importance. While the swimming pool area was destroyed soon afterwards by a fire and the entry and lobby saw major redesign in the 90s, the canteen has so far remained in the original version and today represents a unique and valuable historic document.

=== Private House at Binningen ===
The rooms open to guests in this mansion were designed by Panton in such a way that they acted as a kind of showroom for his work. Particularly noticeable were the entrance hall with its ringed lamps, the dining room with a spectacular shell ceiling, and the large dining room. This was dominated by the Living Sculpture which today is part of the design collection of the Centre Pompidou in Paris.

=== Gruner & Jahr Publishing House, Hamburg ===
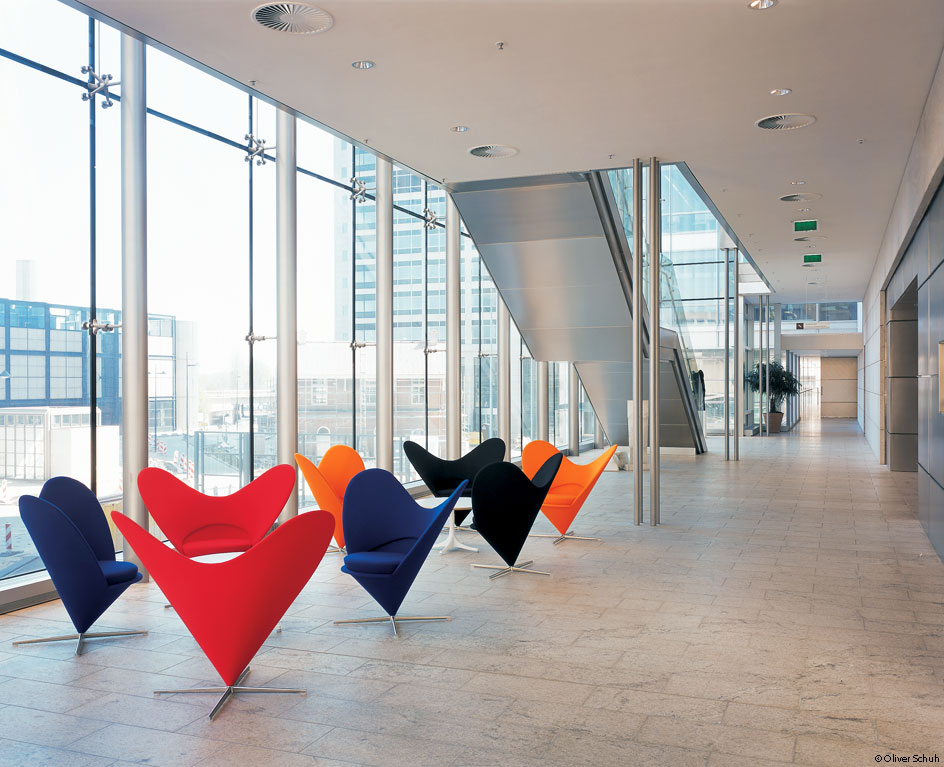
Cone Chair by Verner Panton

The commission to design the new head office of the publishers Gruner & Jahr in Hamburg was as extensive as that for the Spiegel publishing company a few years earlier. Whereas in the design of the offices Panton restricted himself to a simple system of colours and patterns, in the entrance hall and canteen he once more succeeded in using visual trompe l'oeil effects to create interior design solutions. In the lobby the eye was caught by a mirrored ceiling from which the VP Globe lamps were suspended, and in the canteen the carpeting with its wave design gave the floor a three-dimensional appearance.

=== Pantorama ===
In 1979 Panton was able to create the special 'Pantorama' exhibition as part of the Swiss furniture fair in Basel. Here he created monochrome colour spaces in which simple geometrical fixtures and objects set up an atmosphere which was at the same time archaic and highly artificial.

=== Colour Spaces ===
In the "Colour spaces" installation, which Panton showed at Gallery Littmann in Basel in 1996, he demonstrated the power of colour in a physical way. Walking through the sequence of eight circular rooms, each of which was painted in a single colour, visitors were able to perceive the effect of colour, now warming, now cooling. This tunnel of colour was supplemented by foam elements in different shapes and colours, which were spread around a black room like over-sized building blocks.

=== Exhibition Light and Colour at the Trapholt ===
The 'Light and colour' exhibition which opened at the Trapholt Museum on 17 September 1998, only a few days after Panton's death, was his last design project. In eight colourful rooms, which once more provided an impressive demonstration of his masterly use of colours, Panton presented a representative cross section of his entire creation as a designer.

== Selected works ==
=== Interior design ===
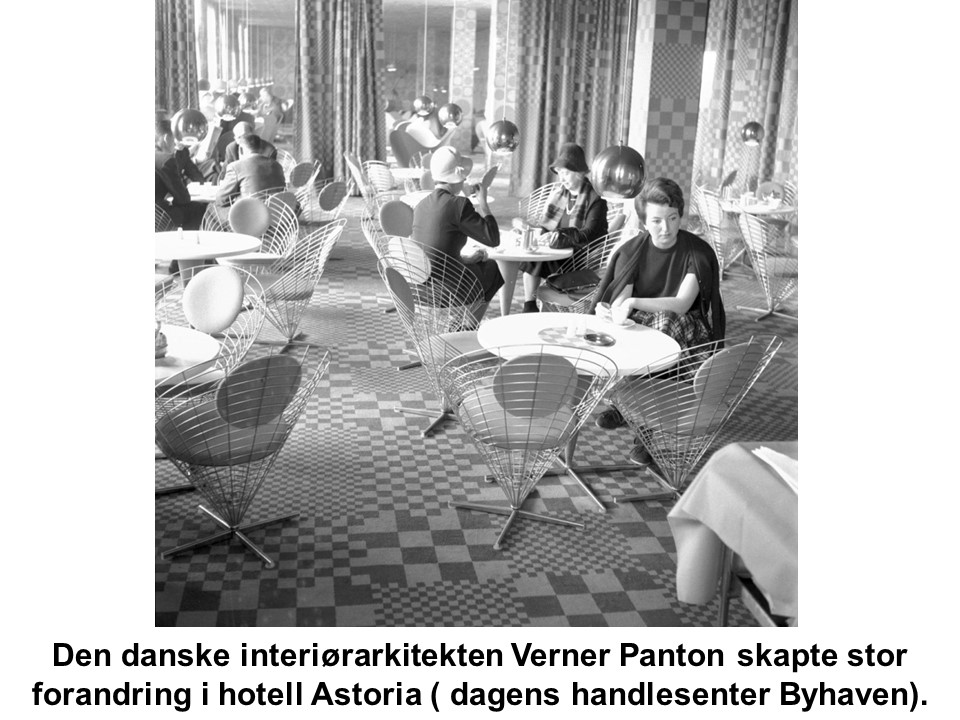
Grand Hall, Astoria Hotel. Designed by Verner Panton

- Kom-igen Guest House
- Astoria Hotel and restaurant in Trondheim, Norway
- Visiona I & Visiona II
- Private House at Binningen
- Gruner & Jahr Publishing House, Hamburg
- Pantorama
- Colour Spaces
- Exhibition Light and Colour at the Trapholt Museum, Kolding, DK
- Varna Restaurant (Arhus)
- University Hospital in Basel
- The Circus Building
- Erco Offices
- Exhibition Light and Colour

=== Furniture design ===
- Cone Chair
- Trivoli Chair
- Bachelor Chair
- Panton Chair
- System 1-2-3
- Vilbert Chair
- Pantoflex
- Panton Wire
- Sculpture Sofa

=== Lighting design ===
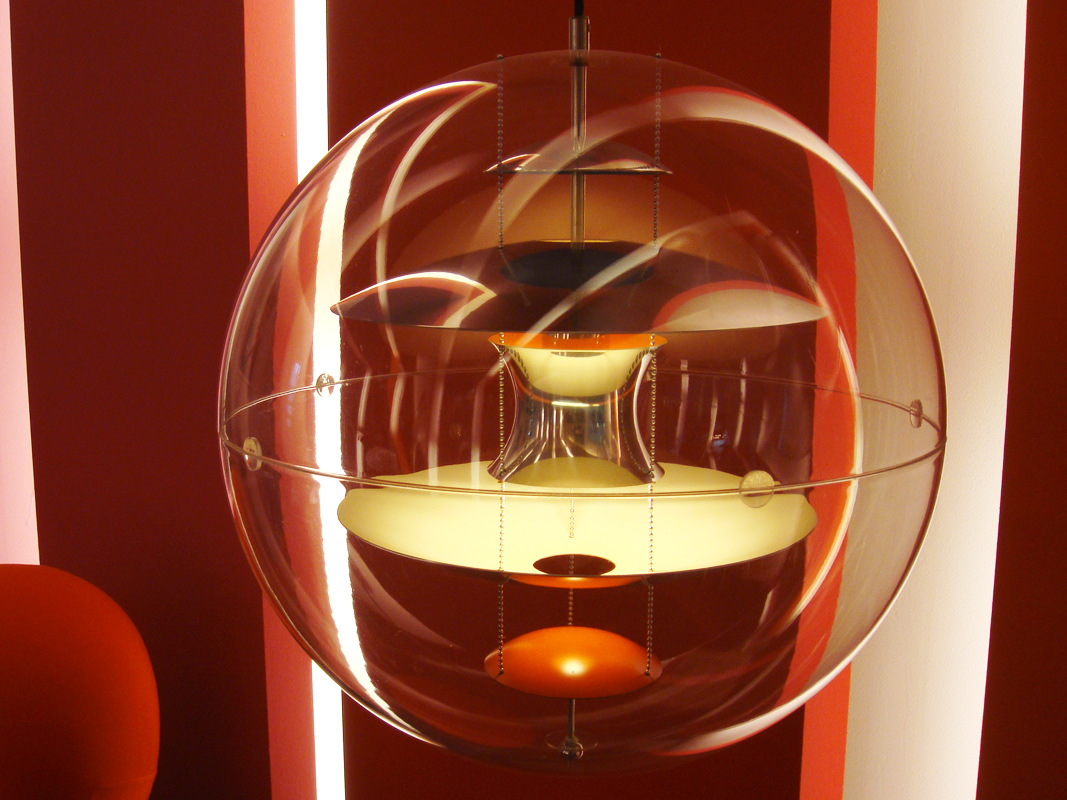
Globe lamp

- Shell Lamp
- Panthella Lamp
- Flower Pot Lamp
- VP Europa lighting
- Moon pendant, 1960
- Globe pendant, 1969
- Spiral pendant, 1969
- Spiegel wall lamp, 1969

=== Textile design ===
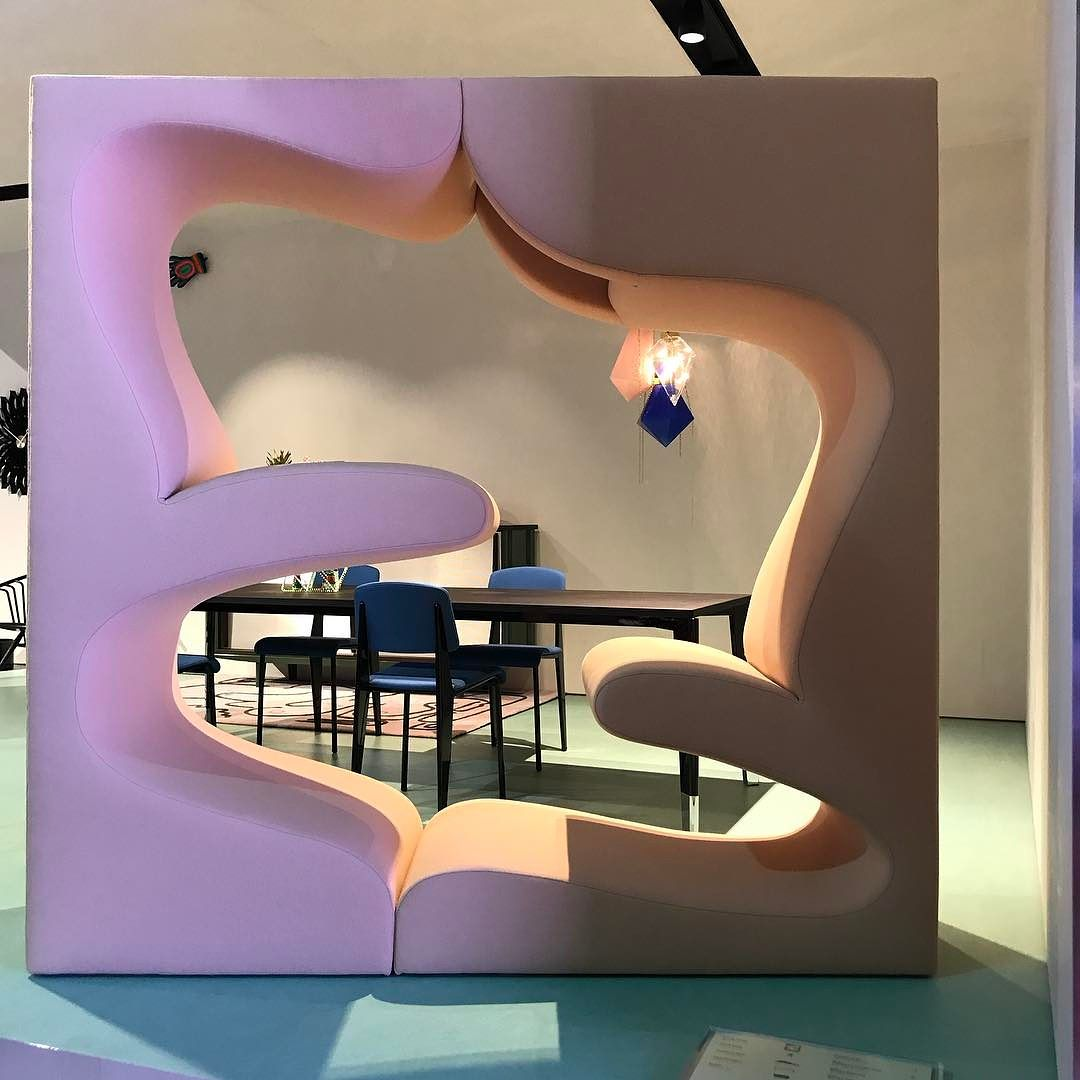
"Living tower", an example of how textile can be used to generate different shapes in textures.

- Living tower

=== Industrial design ===
- Swatch Art Clock Tower
- Candlesticks, multiple vase collections, clocks, a television, WEGA-Radio, mirror sculptures, enamel wall panels and enamel objects, wall art, toys, planters and saucers, glass wear, dining supplies, window coverings.

=== Architecture ===
- All Round House

== Awards and honors ==
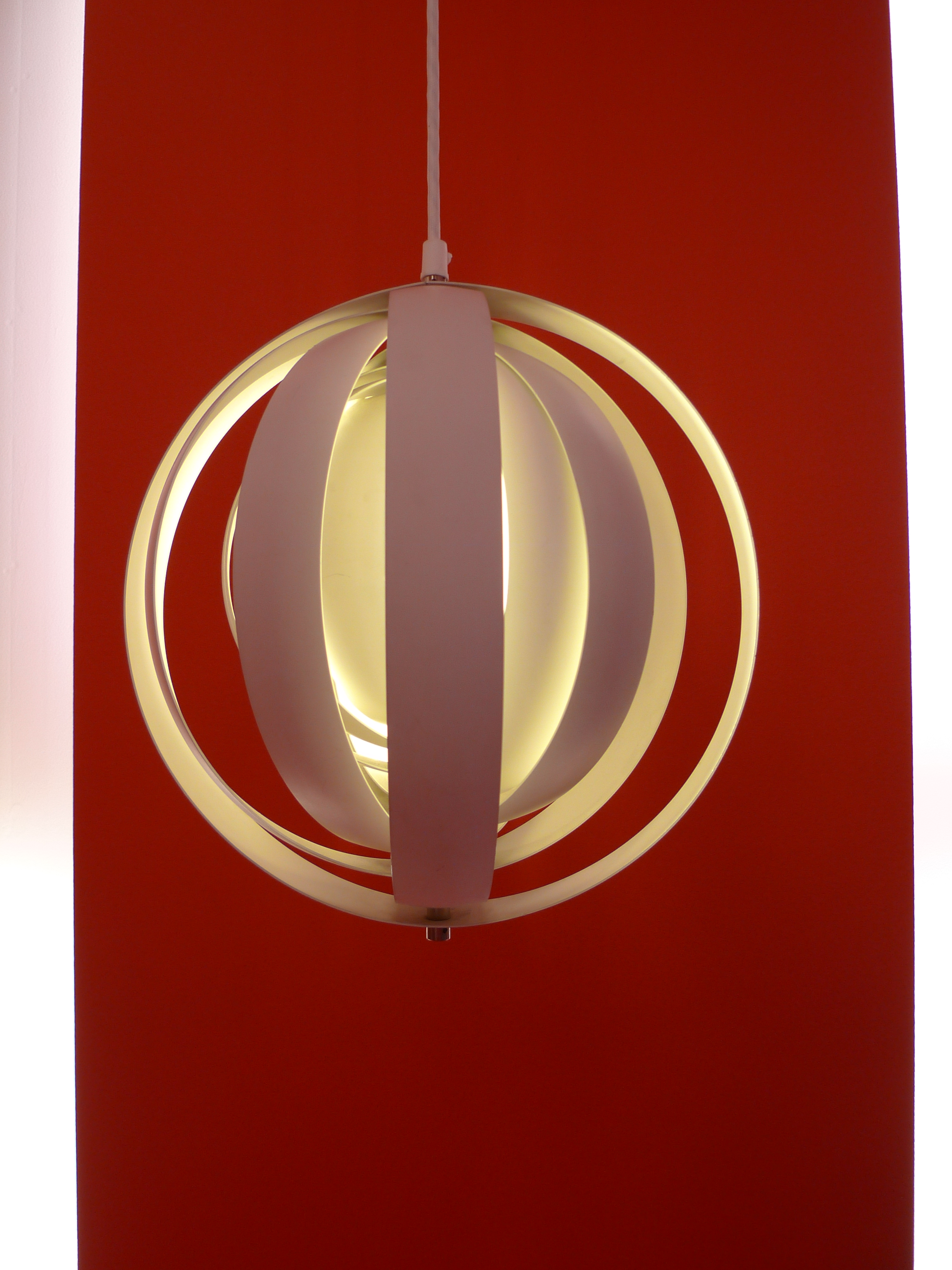
Moon lamp, one of Panton's most famous designs

- International Design Award (1963, 1968, 1981, 1986)
- Rosenthal Studio Prize (Germany, 1966)
- Poul Henningsen Prize (Denmark, 1967)
- Eurodomus 2 (Italy, 1968)
- Medal of the Austrian Building Centre (Austria, 1968)
- Prize of Honour: 4th Austrian Furniture Exhibition (Austria, 1969)
- Gute Form Prize (Germany, 1972, 1986)
- Møbelprisen, special exhibition Pantorama is presented at the international Swiss Furniture Fair in Basle (Denmark, 1978)
- Deutsche Auswahl (German Selection) five times, (Germany, 1981–1984)
- Sadolin Farve Prize (Denmark, 1986)
- Dansk Designgråd Årspris prize (Denmark, 1991)
- IF Prize (1971, 1972, 1992)
- Norway's Design Prize (1992)
- Bo Bedre Prisen (1998)
- Order of the Dannebrog (1998)
- Vitra Design Museum dedicates Retrospektive (2000)
- Weil am Rhein, D, honors Verner Panton with own street name: Verner-Panton-Weg (2012)

== See also ==
- Danish design
