= Gebrüder Thonet =

Former furniture manufacturer

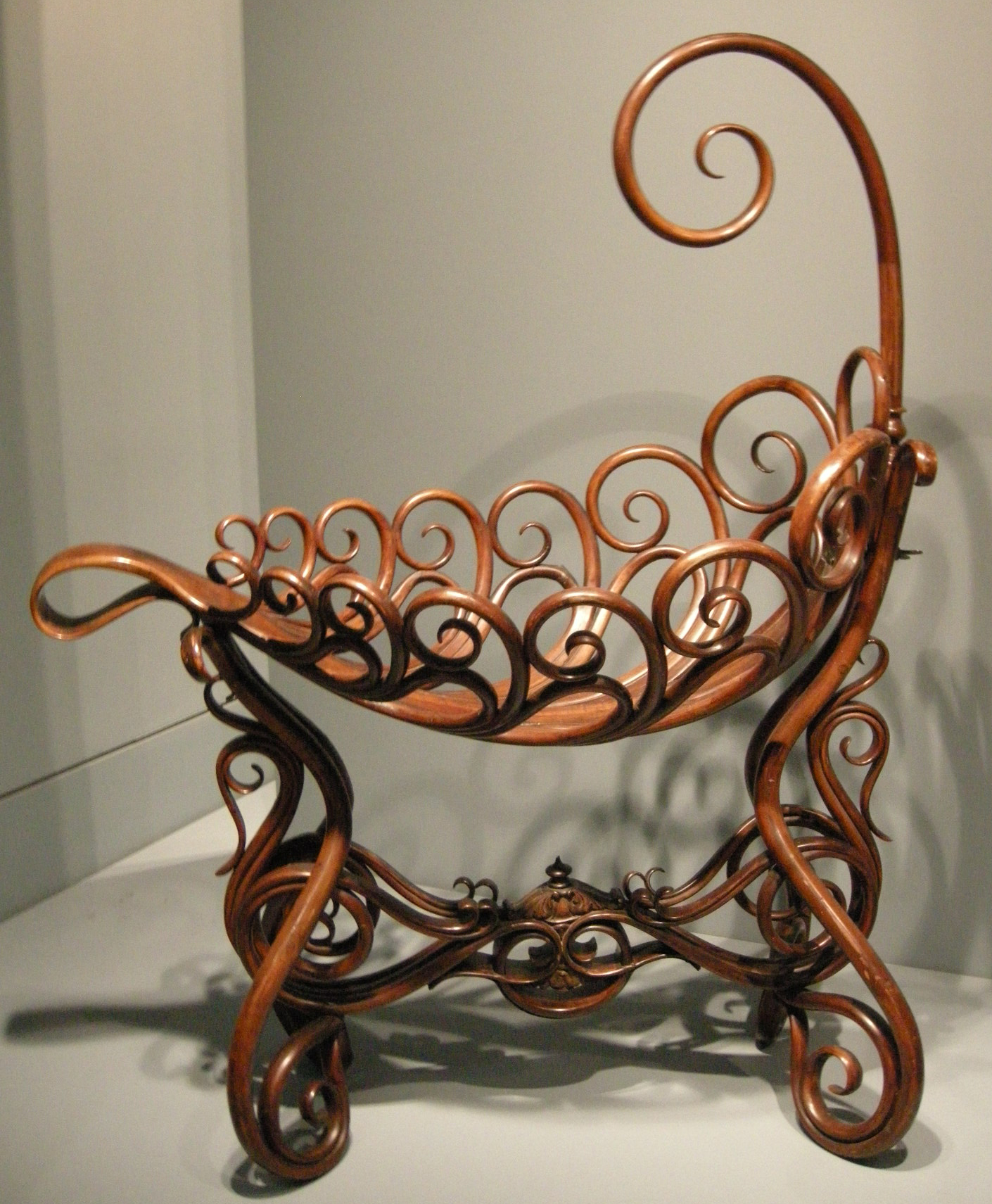
Cradle by Gebrüder Thonet (c. 1870)

Gebrüder Thonet or the Thonet Brothers was a European furniture manufacturer. Three firms descended from the original company remain active today, in Germany (Thonet GmbH), Austria (Thonet Vienna) and the Czech Republic (TON).

== History ==
Gebrüder Thonet were particularly known for their manufacture of bentwood furniture, for which they had developed the first industrial-scale production processes. These replaced previous individual craft skills with an investment in machinery that allowed any worker to produce accurate and repeatable bent components. Although steam bending was long established for pieces such as the Windsor chair, these older pieces had used the bending of a raw billet that would then be shaped to size afterwards. Thonet's more precise process allowed timber to be machined with a surface finish as raw stock (usually as thick circular dowel), steam bent to shape, then used as a component almost immediately, without further machining other than to trim the ends.

The company was founded by Michael Thonet in Vienna by transferring the company Thonet to his sons under the new name Gebrüder Thonet in 1853. In 1856 the brothers expanded with a furniture factory in Koryčany and in the next years, five more Central European production sites were established in Bystřice pod Hostýnem (1861), Veľké Uherce (1866), Vsetín (1867), Halenkov (1867) and Radomsko (1880).

The company's best known design is the No. 14 chair, the iconic chair of Parisian cafes which the designer Japer Morrison described as "refined to the point where there is no way to improve it."

Gebrüder Thonet merged with Mundus AG in 1921 to become the world's largest furniture manufacturer. The buyback of the shares in the Thonet Mundus AG by the Thonet family followed in 1938.

In the aftermath of World War II, Thonet lost all of its production facilities in the Eastern Bloc states through expropriation, and the sales office at Viennas Stephansplatz had been destroyed during the war. From 1945 to 1953, Georg Thonet, the great-grandson of company founder, Michael Thonet, rebuilt the completely destroyed facilities in Frankenberg, Hesse, in the north of Hesse, where Thonet GmbH's head office and production facilities remain until today. Economic success returned quickly and the company sought the cooperation of outstanding designers. The list of designers who have worked with Thonet over the past 60 years is long and filled with top caliber names: Egon Eiermann, Verner Panton, Eddie Harlis, Hanno von Gustedt, Rudolf Glatzel, Pierre Paulin, Gerd Lange, Hartmut Lohmeyer, Ulrich Böhme and Wulf Schneider, Alfredo Häberli, Christophe Marchand, Lord Norman Foster, Delphin Design, Glen Oliver Löw, James Irvine, Piero Lissoni, Stefan Diez, Lievore Altherr Molina, Lepper Schmidt Sommerlade, Hadi Teherani, Läufer + Keichel. Moreover, the company's own design team regularly adds new designs to Thonet's portfolio.

In 1976 Gebrüder Thonet was divided into a German (Gebrüder Thonet) and an Austrian company (Thonet Vienna). The two companies are independent of each other.

== Thonet today ==
In 2006 Gebrüder Thonet becomes Thonet GmbH. Today, Thorsten Muck runs the company with its head offices and production facilities in Frankenberg/Eder (Germany). Michael Thonet's direct descendants in the fifth and sixth generation remain involved in the company's business as associates and sales partners. The collection still comprises famous bentwood furniture, tubular steel classics from the Bauhaus era, and current designs by famous contemporary architects and designers.

== Museums and exhibitions ==
In 1989 a museum was opened in Frankenberg, which is located on the company premises and shows historical exhibits on 700 square meters of exhibition space.

The Museum of Applied Arts Vienna has a large furniture collection and shows in its permanent exhibition an overview of one hundred years of Thonet production as well as that of the Kohn brothers and the furniture factory Danhauser. The Hofmobiliendepot (Imperial Furniture Collection) in Vienna also shows selected objects from Thonet, including the graceful Michael Thonet running chair from 1843/48 for the Vienna Stadtpalais Liechtenstein.

To mark the 200th anniversary of the Thonet company, the Museum of Applied Arts, Vienna (MAK Vienna) presented a comprehensive exhibition of Thonet designs, featuring items from MAK's permanent collection, running from December 2019 to September 2020.

== Bibliography ==
- Renzi/Thillmann, sedie a dondolo Thonet – Thonet rocking chairs, Silvana Editoriale, Milano 2006, ISBN 978-88-366-0671-9
- Lara, Natascha/Thillmann, Wolfgang, Bugholzmöbel in Südamerika – Bentwood furniture in South America – Muebles de madera curvada, La Paz 2008
- Thillmann, Wolfgang/ Willscheid, Bernd, MöbelDesign – Roentgen, Thonet und die Moderne, Roentgen Museum Neuwied, Neuwied 2011, ISBN 978-3-9809797-9-5
- Official Website of Thonet GmbH: http://www.thonet.de
- Basic press portfolio of Thonet GmbH

== Types ==
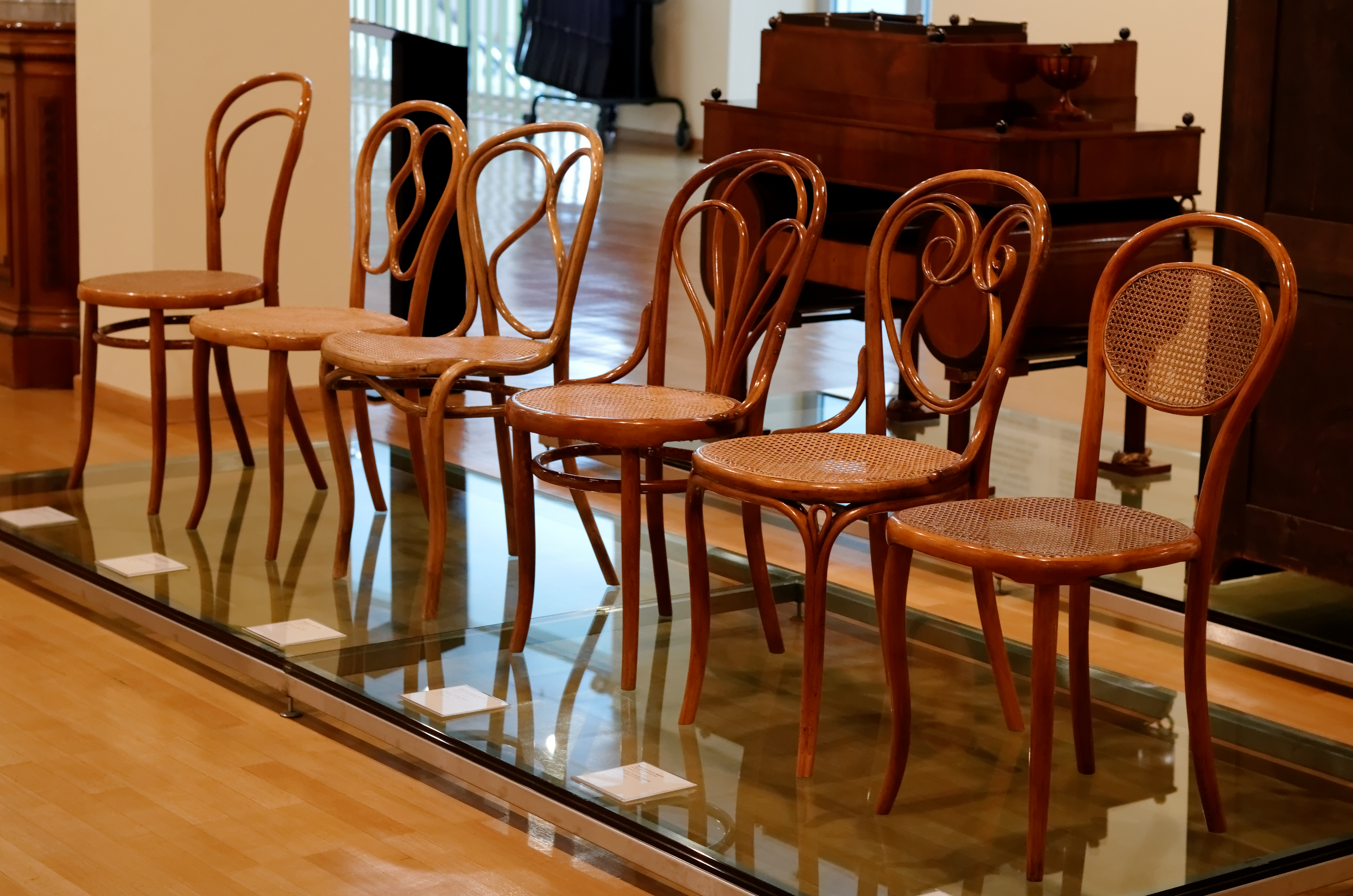
Thonet chairs Wien museum Karlplatz

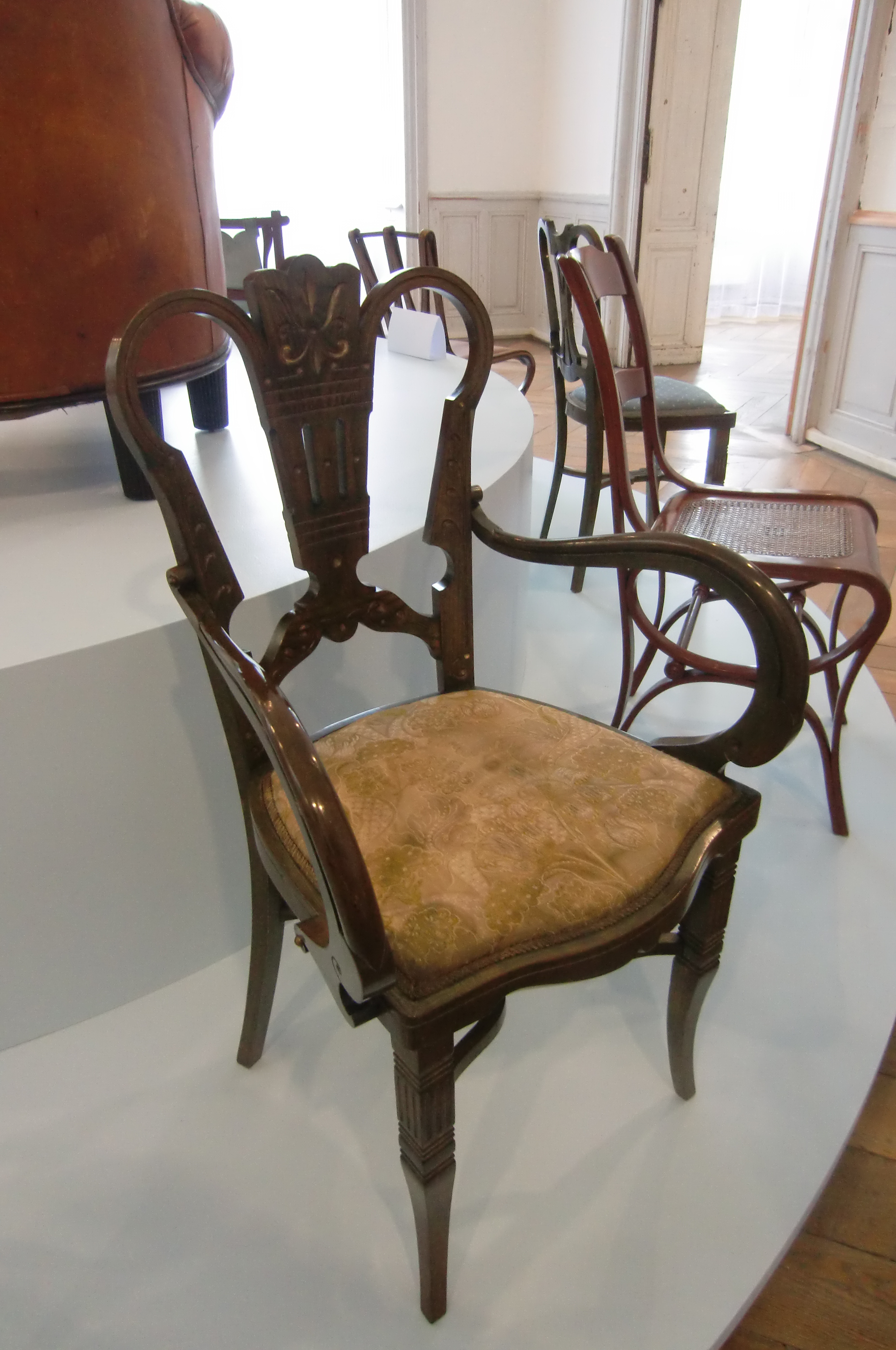
Thonet-exhibition

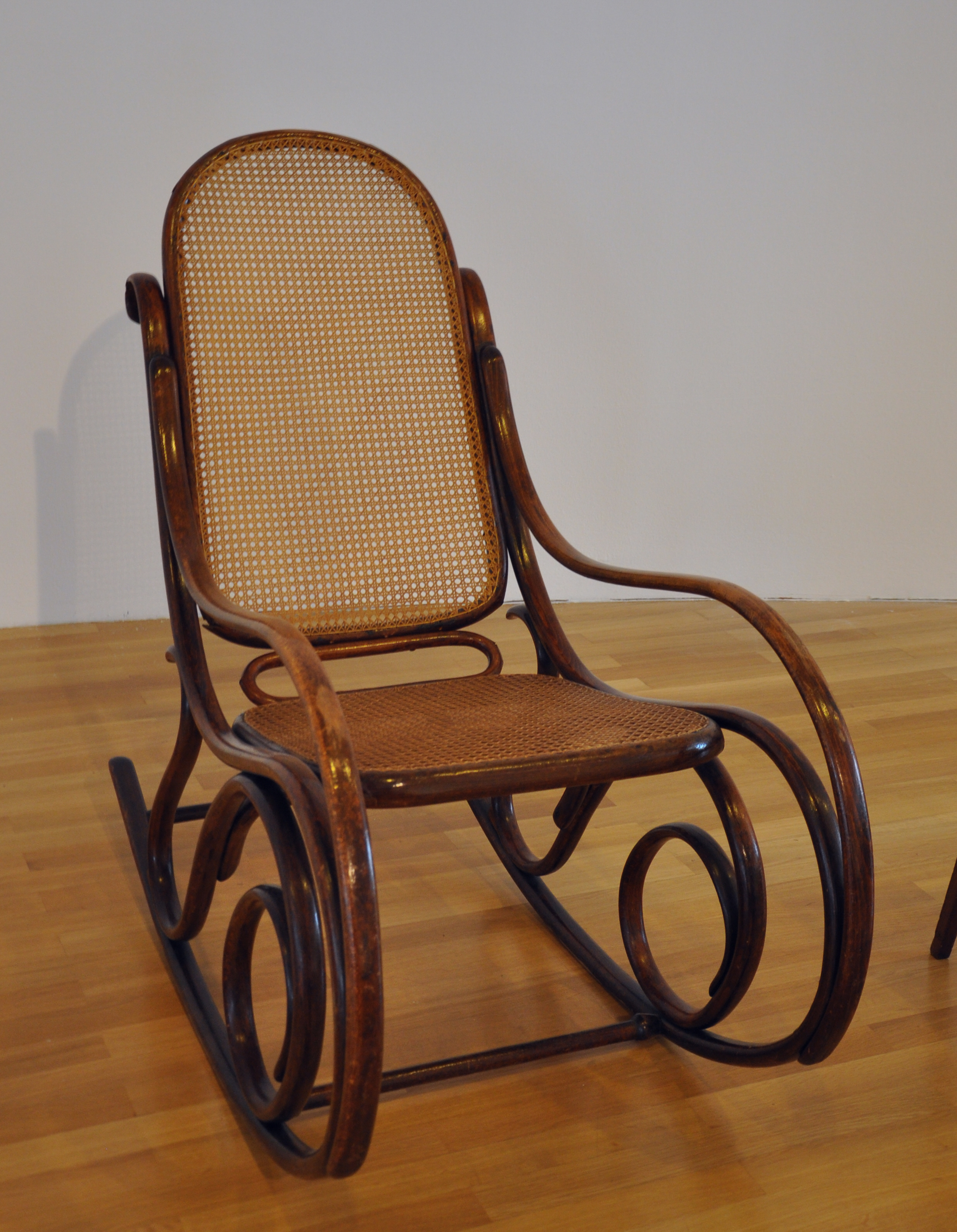
Thonet rocking chair

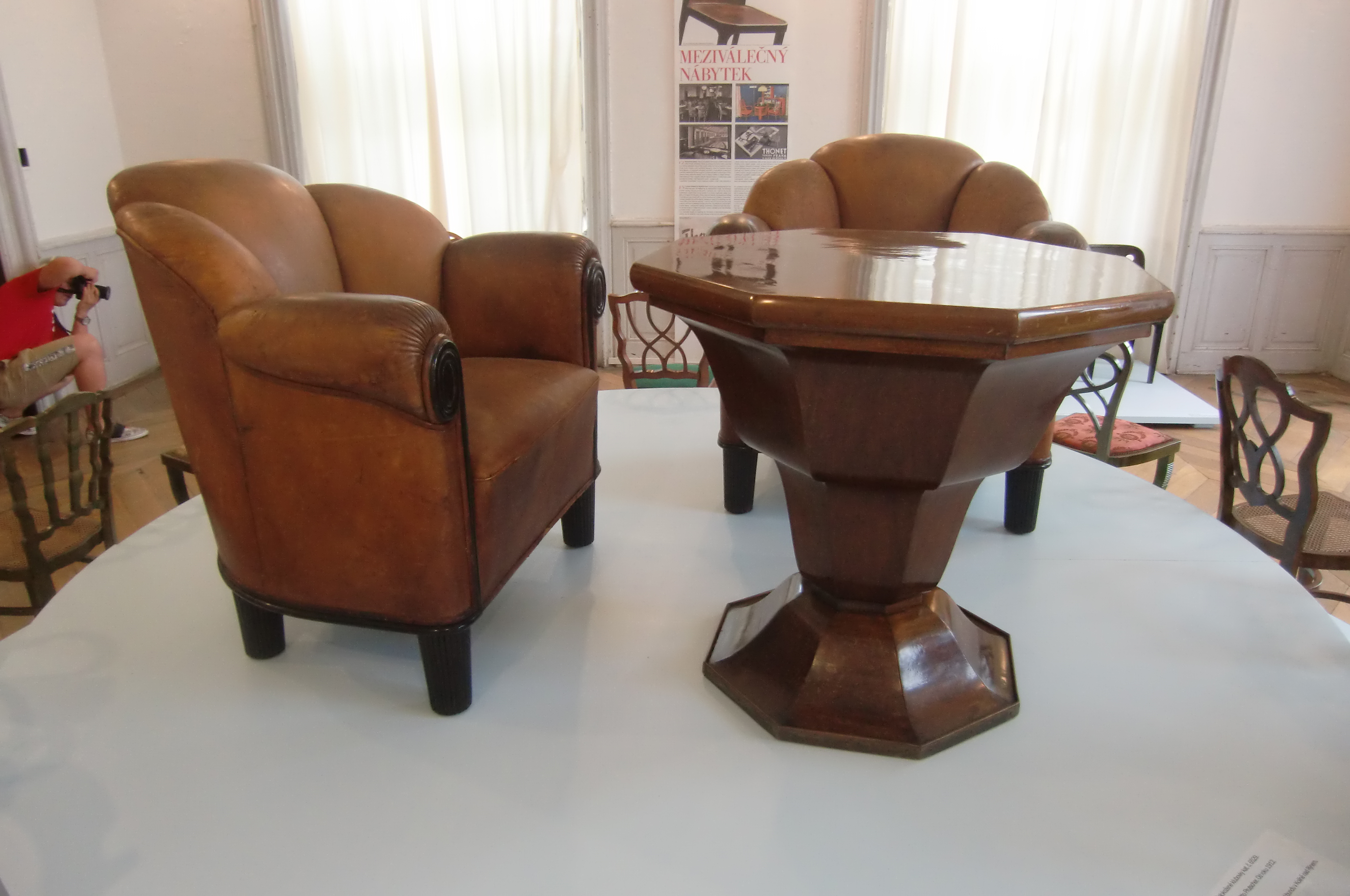
Armchair by Thonet

== Literature ==
- Üner, Stefan: Gebrüder Thonet, in: Wagner, Hoffmann, Loos und das Möbeldesign der Wiener Moderne. Künstler, Auftraggeber, Produzenten, ed. by Eva B. Ottillinger, Exhib. Cat. Hofmobiliendepot, Vienna, 20 March – 7 October 2018, p. 149–152, ISBN 978-3-205-20786-3.
- Albrecht Bangert: Thonet Möbel. Bugholz-Klassiker von 1830 bis 1930. Heyne, München 1997, ISBN 3-453-13047-2. * Hans H. Buchwald: Form from Process. The Thonet chair. Carpenter Center for the Visual arts, Cambridge Mass. 1967.
- Reinhard Engel, Marta Halpert: Luxus aus Wien II. Czernin Verlag, Wien 2002, ISBN 3-7076-0142-0.
- Andrea Gleininger: Der Kaffeehausstuhl Nr. 14 von Michael Thonet. Birkhäuser, Frankfurt/M. 1998, ISBN 3-7643-6832-2.
- Heinz Kähne: Möbel aus gebogenem Holz. Ein Blick in die Sammlung der Stadt Boppard. Boppard 2000. * Heinz Kähne: Thonet Bugholz-Klassiker. Eine Einführung in die Schönheit und Vielfalt der Thonet-Möbel. Rhein-Mosel Verlag, Briedel 1999, ISBN 3-929745-70-4.
- Heinz Kähne: Die Thonets in Boppard. Sutton Verlag, Erfurt 2008, ISBN 978-3-86680-368-8.
- Brigitte Schmutzler: Eine unglaubliche Geschichte. Michael Thonet und seine Stühle. Landesmuseum, Koblenz 1996, ISBN 3-925915-55-9.
- Sembach, Leuthäuser, Gössel: Möbeldesign im 19. Jahrhundert, Benedikt Taschen GmbH, Köln 1990, ISBN 3-8228-0365-0. * Eva B. Ottilinger (Hrsg.): Gebrüder Thonet- Möbel aus gebogenem Holz, Böhlau Verlag, Wien Köln Weimar 2003, ISBN 3-205-77102-8.
- Renz, Wolfgang Thillmann, sedie a dondolo Thonet – Thonet rocking chairs, Silvana Editoriale, Milano 2006, ISBN 88-366-0671-7.
- Natascha Lara, Wolfgang Thillmann, Bugholzmöbel in Südamerika – Bentwood furniture in South America – Muebles de madera curvada, La Paz 2008.
- Wolfgang Thillmann, Bernd Willscheid, MöbelDesign – Roentgen, Thonet und die Moderne, Roentgen Museum Neuwied, Neuwied 2011, ISBN 978-3-9809797-9-5.
- Alexander von Vegesack, "Mass Production Chair Man", 1 December 1996, The Independent,
