= Michael Thonet =

German-Austrian cabinet maker

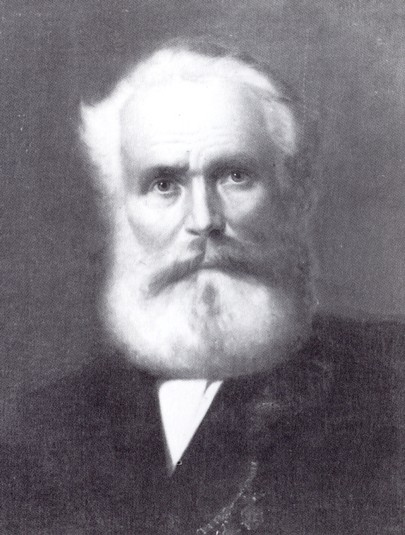
- Michael Thonet in his 60s
- Born: 2 July 1796; Boppard, Electorate of Trier, Holy Roman Empire
- Died: 3 March 1871 (aged 74); Vienna, Austria-Hungary

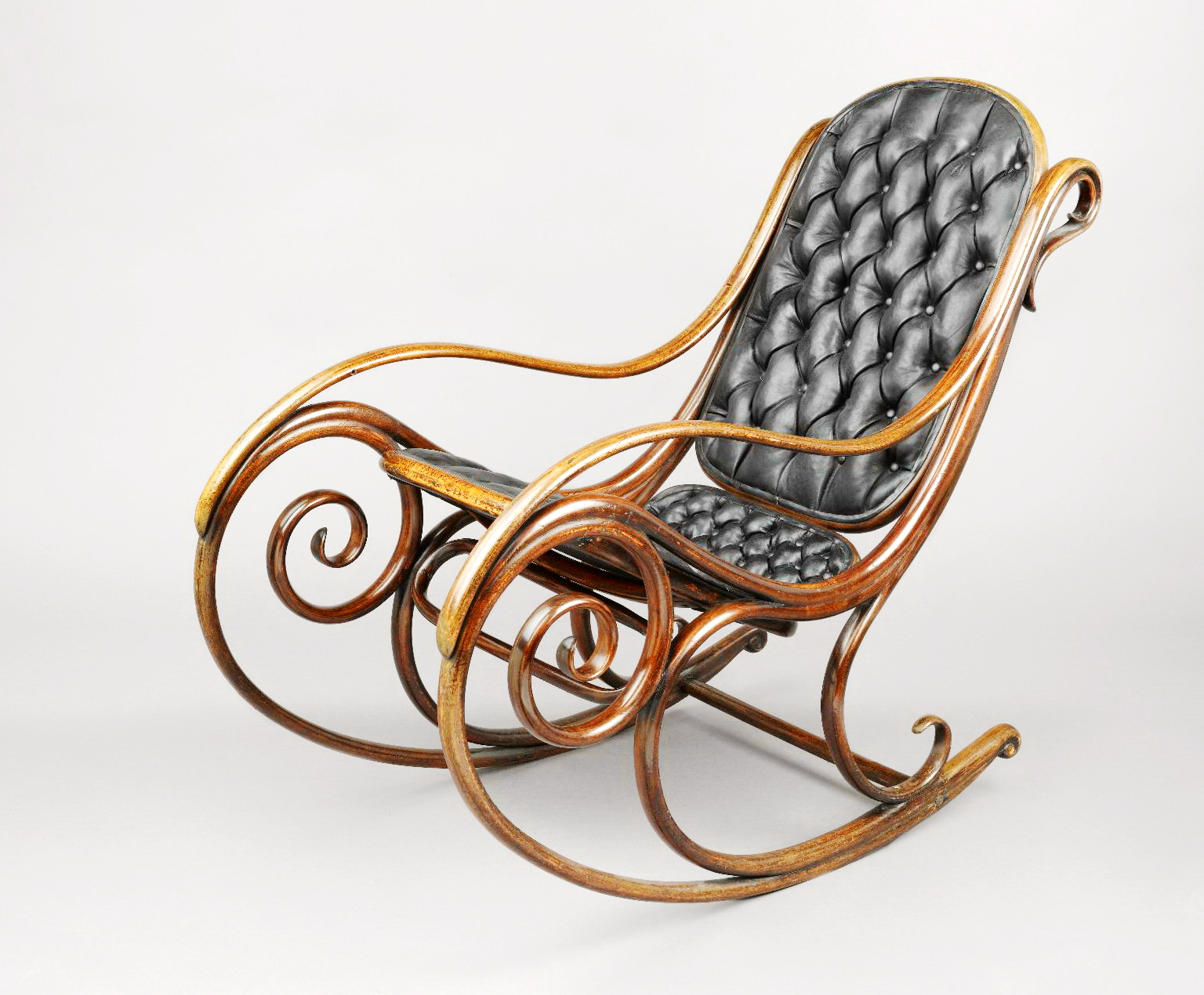
Rocking Chair, Model 1, ca 1860 Brooklyn Museum

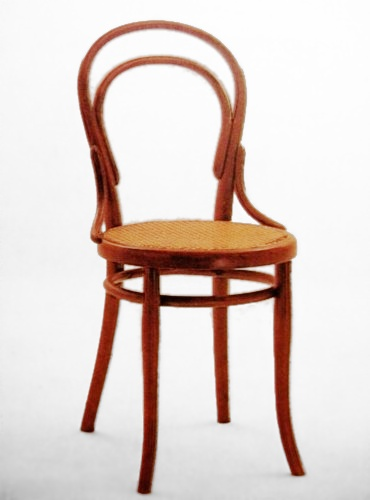
"Chair no. 14" ("Konsumstuhl Nr. 14") from 1859

Michael Thonet (2 July 1796 – 3 March 1871) was a German-Austrian cabinet maker, known for the invention of bentwood furniture.

== Career ==
Thonet was the son of the master tanner Franz Anton Thonet of Boppard. Following a carpenter's apprenticeship, Thonet set himself up as an independent cabinetmaker in 1819. A year later, he married Anna Grahs, with whom he had seven sons and six daughters. Only five of the sons, however, survived early childhood.

In the 1830s, Thonet began trying to make furniture out of glued and bent wooden slats. His first success was the Bopparder Schichtholzstuhl (Boppard layerwood chair) in 1836. Thonet gained substantial independence by acquiring the Michelsmühle, the glue factory that made the glue for this process, in 1837. However, his attempts to patent the technology failed in Germany (1840) as well as in Great Britain, France and Russia (1841). Thonet's essential breakthrough was his success in having light, strong wood bent into curved, graceful shapes by forming the wood in hot steam. This enabled him to design entirely novel, elegant, lightweight, durable and comfortable furniture, which appealed strongly to fashion – a complete departure from the heavy, carved designs of the past – and whose aesthetic and functional appeal remains to this day.

At the Koblenz trade fair of 1841, Thonet met Prince Klemens Wenzel von Metternich, who was enthusiastic about Thonet's furniture and invited him to the Vienna court. The next year, Thonet was able to present his furniture, and his chairs in particular, to the Imperial Family.

As the Boppard establishment got into financial difficulties, Thonet sold it and emigrated to Vienna with his family. There, he worked with his sons on the interior decoration of the Stadtpalais Liechtenstein for the Carl Leistler establishment. In 1849, he again opened his own shop together with his four sons. A few years later, in 1853, he transferred the company to his sons under the name Gebrüder Thonet.

In 1850 he produced his Nr. 1 chair. The Great Exhibition in London 1851 saw him receive the bronze medal for his Vienna bentwood chairs. This was his international breakthrough. At the next World's Fair, Exposition Universelle in Paris 1855, he was awarded the silver medal as he continued to improve his production methods. In 1856 he was able to open up a new factory in Koryčany, Moravia.

The 1859 chair Nr. 14 – better known as Konsumstuhl Nr. 14, coffee shop chair no. 14 – is still called the "chair of chairs" with some 50 million produced and still in production today. The innovative bending technique allowed for the industrial production of a chair for the first time ever. What was revolutionary about the former no. 14, which is today's no. 214, was that it could be disassembled into a few components and thus produced in work-sharing processes. The chair could be exported to all nations of the world in simple, space saving packages: 36 disassembled chairs could fit into a one cubic meter box. It yielded a gold medal for Thonet's enterprise at the 1867 Paris World's Fair.

At the time, the chair no. 14 cleared the way for Thonet to become a global company. Numerous pieces of bentwood furniture followed. Some models also became icons of design history: the rocking chair no. 1 from 1860, later on in the 19th century the successful models no. 18 and no. 56, around 1900, the elegant no. 209 with its curved armrests, which Le Corbusier adored, and in 1904 the art nouveau armchair 247 by Otto Wagner, the so-called postal savings bank chair, to name but a few. Thonet production peaked in 1912: two million different products were manufactured and sold worldwide.

In 1857, Michael Thonet's sons as Gebrüder Thonet commissioned the first Thonet furniture factory to be built in the Moravian town of Koryčany using their father's plans. In the coming years, five more production sites were established in Central Europe. In 1861, Thonet and his sons established a bentwood furniture factory in Bystřice pod Hostýnem, which is today the oldest still operating factory of its kind in the world. The factory is now run by the Czech company TON, which is a follow-up company to the Thonet-Mundus concern. In 1889 the seventh and last production site was added in the town of Frankenberg, Hesse, Germany. After World War I and World War II, this one was the only one to remain owned by the family. It is Thonet's head office until today.

As Michael Thonet died 1871 in Vienna, the Fa. Gebrüder Thonet had sales locations across Europe as well as Chicago and New York City. Today, a museum in the factory in Frankenberg showcases the firm's history and the Thonet design.

In 1976 Thonet was divided into a German and an Austrian company (Thonet Vienna). The two companies are independent of each other. In 2006 Gebrüder Thonet became Thonet GmbH.

== Thonet today ==
The success of the company Thonet GmbH in Frankenberg, Germany, began with the work of master joiner Michael Thonet (1796–1871). Since he founded his first woodworking shop in 1819 in Boppard, the name Thonet has stood for high-quality, innovative and elegant furniture. Today, Thorsten Muck runs the company with its head offices and production facilities in Frankenberg. Michael Thonet's direct descendants in the fifth and sixth generation remain involved in the company's business as associates and sales partners. The collection comprises famous bentwood furniture, tubular steel classics from the Bauhaus era, and current designs by famous contemporary architects and designers.

Often mispronounced "tho-nay" the name is pronounced "toe-net" with a hard beginning and ending t.

The Museum of Applied Arts, MAK Vienna hosts the largest collection of original Thonet chairs in Austria.

== Bibliography ==
- Üner, Stefan: Gebrüder Thonet, in: Wagner, Hoffmann, Loos und das Möbeldesign der Wiener Moderne. Künstler, Auftraggeber, Produzenten, ed. by Eva B. Ottillinger, Exhib. Cat. Hofmobiliendepot, Vienna, March 20 – October 7, 2018, pp. 149–152, ISBN 978-3-205-20786-3
- Albrecht Bangert: Thonet Möbel. Bugholz-Klassiker von 1830–1930. Heyne, München 1997, ISBN 3-453-13047-2
- Hans H. Buchwald: Form from Process. The Thonet chair. Carpenter Center for the Visual arts, Cambridge Mass., 1967.
- Danko, Peter. Thoughts on Thonet – "Fine Woodworking" January/February 1985: 112–114.
- Del Ducca, Giuseppe. Michael Thonet. 9 November 1999. (11/9/99).
- "Galerie Thonet", Galerie Thonet. 8 November 1999. (11/8/99).
- Gatsura, Genrih (Henry). THONET FURNITURE. "Brothers Thonet" on the furniture market of Imperial Russia. Moscow, 2001, 2013, ISBN 5-7949-0088-1
- Andrea Gleininger: Der Kaffeehausstuhl Nr. 14 von Michael Thonet. Birkhäuser, Frankfurt/M. 1998, ISBN 3-7643-6832-2
- Heinz Kähne: Möbel aus gebogenem Holz. Ein Blick in die Sammlung der Stadt Boppard. Boppard 2000.
- Heinz Kähne: Thonet Bugholz-Klassiker. Eine Einführung in die Schönheit und Vielfalt der Thonet-Möbel. Rhein-Mosel Verlag, Briedel 1999, ISBN 3-929745-70-4
- Labelart WebPage design. Thonet Vienna-Chair No. 14. 9 November 1999.
- Brigitte Schmutzler: Eine unglaubliche Geschichte. Michael Thonet und seine Stühle. Landesmuseum, Koblenz 1996, ISBN 3-925915-55-9
- Reider, William. Antiques: Bentwood Furniture. Architectural Digest August 1996: 106–111.
- Thonet. American Craft December 1990: 42–45.
- Thonet. Gebrüder Thonet GmbH. (11/9/99).
- Alexander von Vegesack: Thonet: Classic Furniture in Bent Wood and Tubular Steel. Rizzoli, New York, 1997, ISBN 0-8478-2040-8
- RENZI/THILLMANN, sedie a dondolo Thonet – Thonet rocking chairs, Silvana Editoriale, Milano 2006, ISBN 978-88-366-0671-9
- LARA, NATASCHA/THILLMANN, WOLFGANG, Bugholzmöbel in Südamerika – Bentwood furniture in South America – Muebles de madera curvada, La Paz 2008.
- THILLMANN, WOLFGANG / WILLSCHEID, BERND, MöbelDesign – Roentgen, Thonet und die Moderne, Roentgen Museum Neuwied, Neuwied 2011, ISBN 978-3-9809797-9-5
- Alexander von Vegesack, "Mass Production Chair Man", 1 December 1996, The Independent.
