= Ercol =

Furniture manufacturer

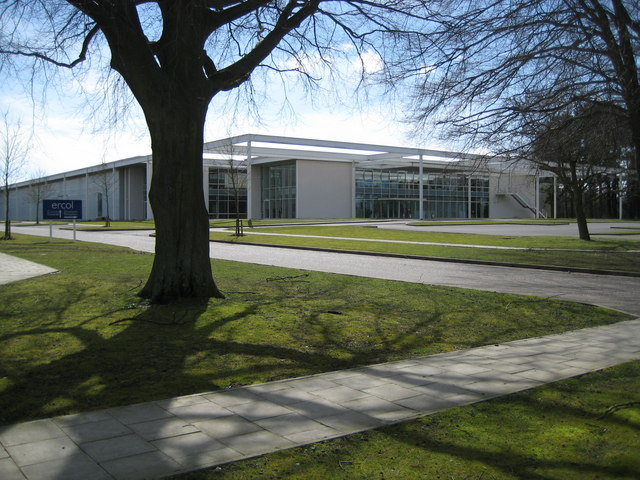
Ercol furniture factory, Princes Risborough

Ercol is a British furniture manufacturer. It was established by Lucian Ercolani and his sons in High Wycombe, Buckinghamshire and is now based in Princes Risborough.

== History ==
=== Origins ===
The company was founded in 1920 as Furniture Industries by Italian-born Lucian Ercolani (1888–1976), who had trained as a furniture designer at Shoreditch Technical Institute, and made his first piece of furniture in 1907. "Ercol" was first registered as a trademark in 1928.

=== World War II ===
At the beginning of the Second World War, the Ercol factory was repurposed to contribute to the war effort, initially making tent pegs from pieces of wood too small for other uses. Over the course of the war Ercol produced 36 million such pegs. In 1944, Ercol was contracted by the government's Board of Trade to produce 100,000 low-cost Windsor chairs under the Utility Furniture Scheme. Windsor chairs were constructed with a bentwood frame and an arched back supporting delicate spindles, using the steam bending of English elm. Before this, elm was not generally used for furniture because of its tendency to warp; Ercolani developed a new drying process for the wood to combat this. This method allowed the chair to be assembled from 14 pre-formed components, and mechanization meant that a chair could be made every 20 seconds.

=== Post-war ===
In 1946, Ercol exhibited its bentwood furniture at the "Britain Can Make It" exhibition, held at the Victoria and Albert Museum, London. In 1947, the first production-line Windsor chair, and other pieces from the range of Windsor furniture, went on sale. Ercol's mass-produced furniture found a good market in post-war Britain, which demanded smaller pieces with simpler lines than their chunky pre-war counterparts. Ercol furniture was exhibited at the 1951 Festival of Britain, as one of the latest styles in furniture design and manufacture.

=== 21st century ===
In 2002, Ercol moved to a new facility, purpose built for the company, in Princes Risborough, Buckinghamshire, where it produces furniture made from North American elm and European ash, beech, oak and walnut. The company sources fabrics from mills in Italy and Belgium, offering a choice of over 100 different options for its upholstery. Because Ercol's upholstery is designed with solid wood frames, it is possible to replace worn-out cushions and other components, prolonging the life of the products. Ercol offers a reCover service to supply replacement cushions.

== Awards ==
Ercol and its employees have been awarded a number of Guild Marks by the Furniture Makers' Company, including:

- 15 Bespoke Guild Marks
- a Design Guild Mark in 2010 for the Treviso desk by Matthew Hilton
- a Design Guild Mark in 2015 for the Svelto round stacking stool by Lisa Gould Sandall

== Activities ==
Ercol partnered with design magazine Wallpaper for an installation at the 2009 London Design Festival – a modern interpretation of the Chair Arch, which was exhibited in the Central Courtyard of the V&A Museum in September 2009.

In May 2023, Grown in Britain, an organization dedicated to safeguarding British forests, partnered with Ercol to launch a line of furniture including the Marino chair and Pebble nest.
