= Lucian Ercolani =

Italian furniture designer

Lucian Randolph Ercolani (born Luciano Randolfo Ercolani; 8 May 1888 – 9 June 1976), was an Italian furniture designer. Born in Sant'Angelo in Vado, Marche, Italy, he later moved to London with his family. He began his career in furniture manufacture with the Salvation Army joinery department, later joining Frederick Parker (later of Parker Knoll fame). In 1920, Ercolani had joined a furniture-making consortium in High Wycombe, trading as Furniture Industries. The business expanded through acquisition, and government orders during World War II for wooden tent pegs and bentwood chairs ensured its success. In the late-1940s, Ercolani developed his range of mass-produced Ercol furniture, which became a household name in post-war Britain, and which continues today.

== Early life ==
Lucian Ercolani was born in Sant'Angelo in Vado, Italy. His father, Abdon Ercolani, a pictureframe maker, migrated to London, England, in search of work, and in 1898 was joined by his family. Ercolani attended a Salvation Army school in London, which he left in 1902, aged 14, to take up a job as a Salvation Army messenger boy. Encouraged by his parents to continue his education, Ercolani enrolled for night school at Shoreditch Technical Institute, where he studied drawing, design, and the theory and construction of furniture. In the early 1900s, Shoreditch was a thriving centre of furniture-making.

== Furniture trade ==
By 1906, Ercolani was working in the Salvation Army joinery department, producing staircases and handrails. In 1910, Frederick Parker (later of Parker Knoll fame) invited him to join his firm, which made furniture at workshops in High Wycombe, the 'furniture capital' of England. Though he was living at 27 Claremont Road, Walthamstow in 1911 census with his largely Italian-born family, including future TV cabinet manufacturer brother Victor. In 1912, Ercolani took up a part-time appointment at High Wycombe Technical School, teaching furniture design to evening classes which were attended by High Wycombe's furniture makers. It was here that he met Edward Gomme, son of a High Wycombe chair-maker. At the outbreak of World War I, Ercolani joined E Gomme Ltd., chair-makers (whose G Plan range of furniture enjoyed considerable success in the 1950s and 1960s). As Ercolani recorded in his biography: “At Gomme’s … it seemed to me … that the simple chair was the outcome of very good and precise workmanship.”

In 1920, Ercolani had joined a furniture-making consortium in High Wycombe, trading as Furniture Industries. The business expanded through acquisition, and government orders during World War II for wooden tent pegs and bentwood chairs ensured its success. In the late-1940s, Ercolani developed his range of mass-produced Ercol furniture, which became a household name in post-war Britain, and which continues today. He played an active part in the Furniture Industry, being a founder member of the industry's guild, the Worshipful Company of Furniture Makers and its Master for 1957-58.

== Personal life ==
Ercolani was married in 1915, to Eva Brett, and they had three children. He took British citizenship in 1923. Ercolani died on 9 June 1976.

== Legacy ==
In 2010 the Worshipful Company of Furniture Makers awarded a Design Guild Mark for Ercolani's Originals collection, as they are now known. The Originals collection reflected a break from the heavy, ornate pre-war styles towards a new clean lined, simple elegance. They were first launched in the late 1950s and were relaunched by Ercol in 2003.
