= Magewappa =

Japanese wood craft

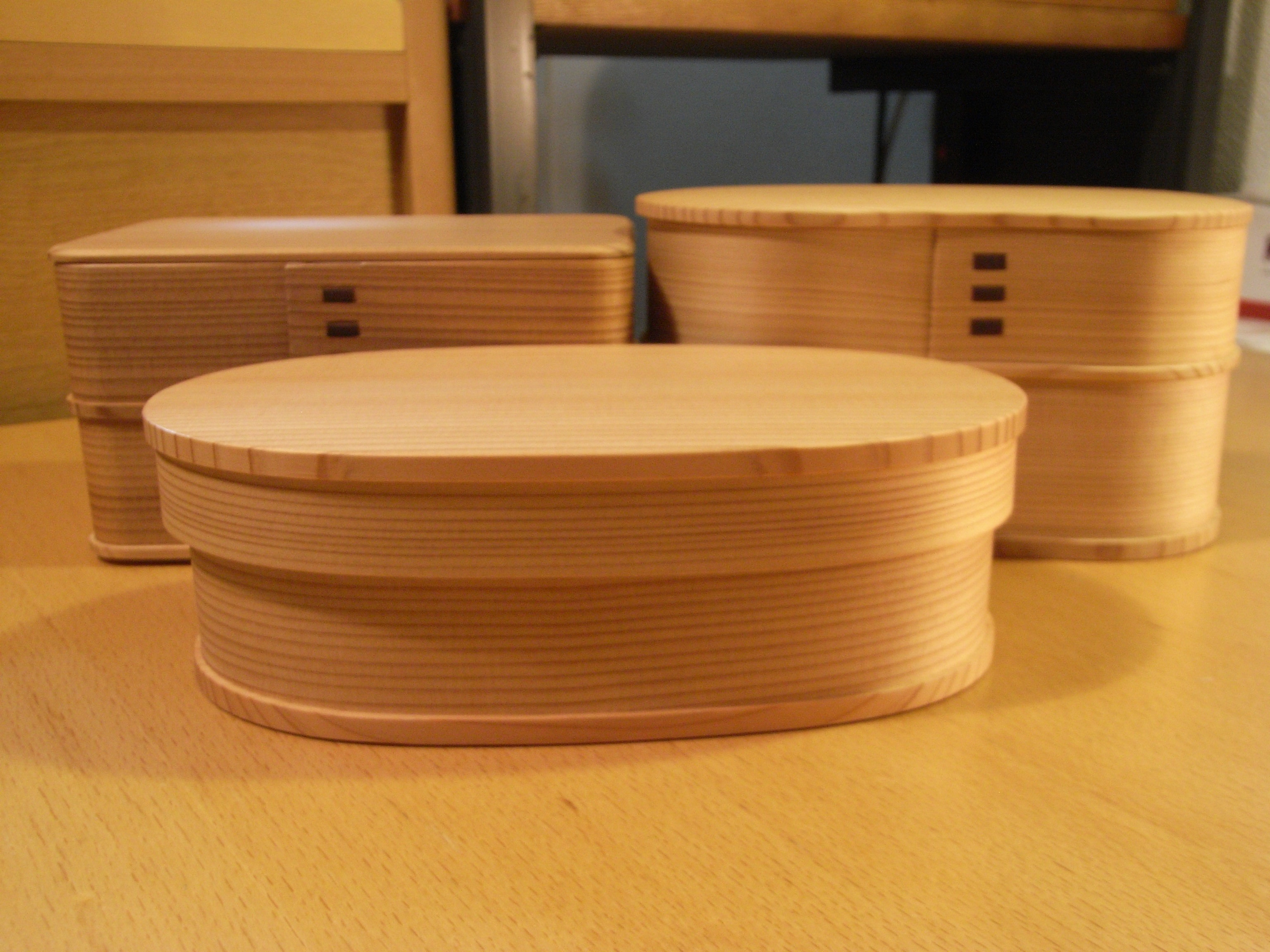
Magewappa containers

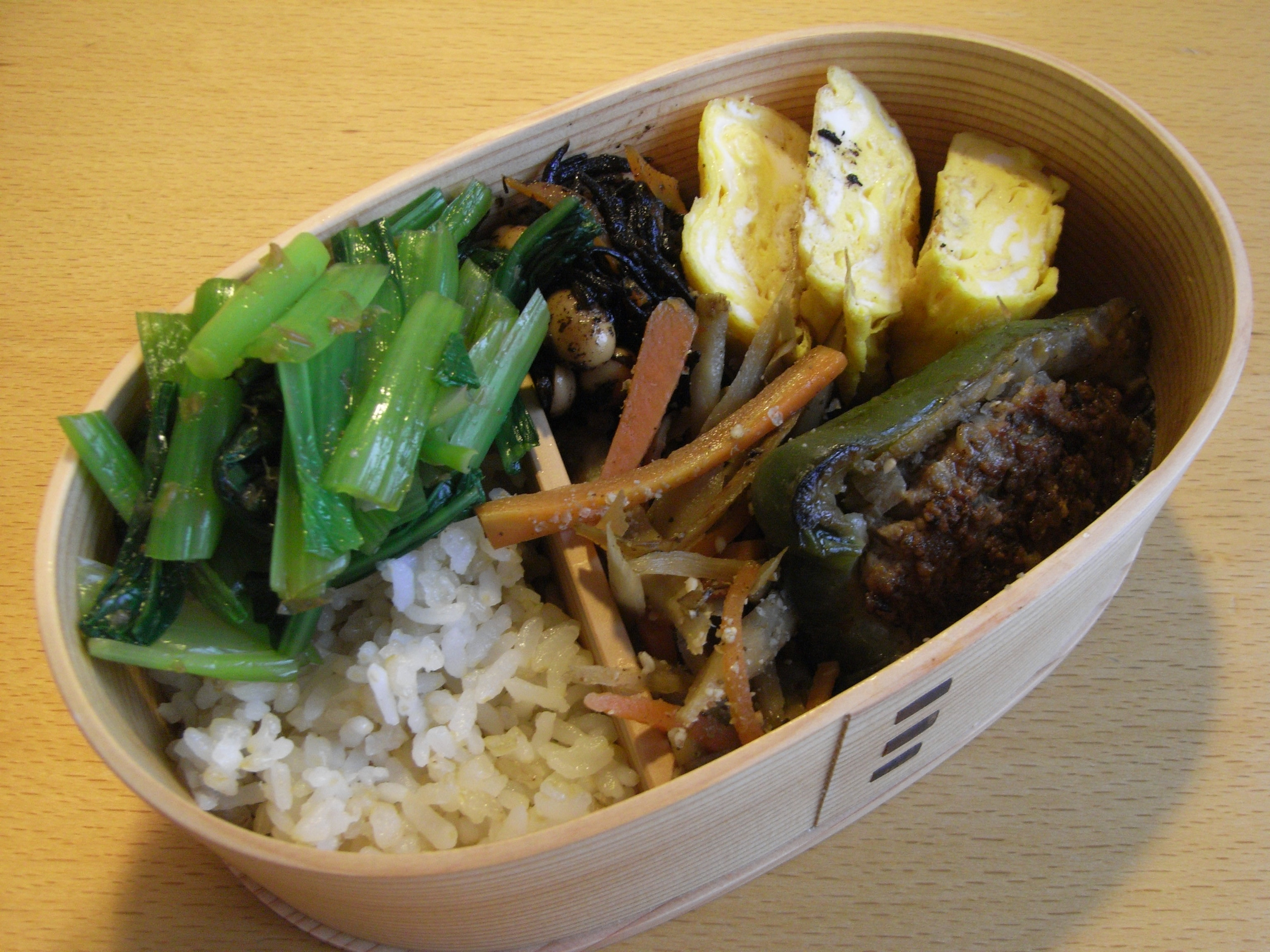
Magewappa are often used to hold Bento

Magewappa (曲げわっぱ; literally "bent woodware") is a traditional Japanese steam bending woodcraft found in Odate, Akita Prefecture, Japan. Magewappa products are known for the brilliant elegance of their straight grain, and the light yet rich color.

== History ==
Magewappa was first made by woodcutters in the Odate area, using straight-grain Akita cedar. The Lord of Odate Castle, Nishiie Satake, encouraged this craft, which has been passed on from the end of the Edo period to the present.

== Process ==
For more than four hundred years the people of the area have exploited mountains, planted Japanese cedars, and repeated the process of weeding, pruning, and thinning out the forests.

== Trees ==
Out of four hundred saplings of Akita cedar planted, fewer than thirty might be found suitable for magewappa. Only Akita cedars over one hundred years old, which have survived the very severe weather conditions of northern Japan, can be bent in the production process. Ones with a knot or even slight discoloration cannot be used.

== See also ==
- Birch bark
- Shaker-style pantry box
