= Bentwood =

Wood shaped into curves while wet

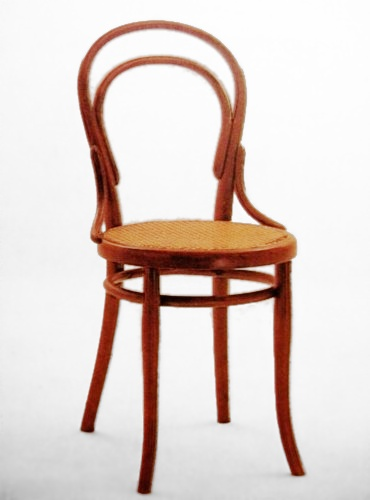
No. 14 chair

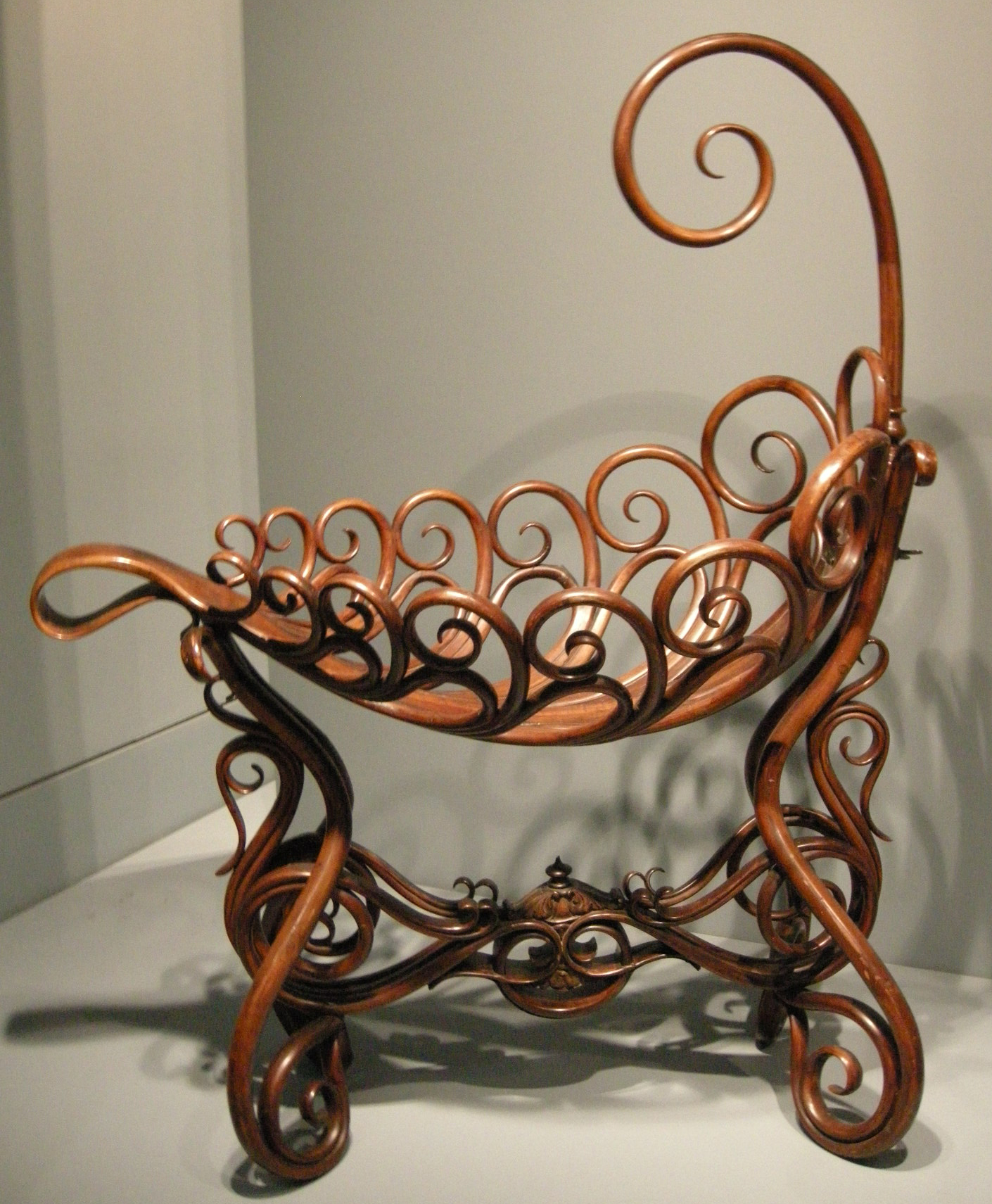
Cradle by Gebrüder Thonet (c. 1870)

Bentwood objects are made by wetting wood (either by soaking or by steaming), then bending it and letting it harden into curved shapes and patterns.

Furniture-makers often use this method in the production of rocking chairs, cafe chairs, and other light furniture. The iconic No. 14 chair (also known as the "Vienna chair"), developed in the 1850s in the Austrian Empire by Thonet, is a well-known design based on the technique. The process is in widespread use for making casual and informal furniture of all types, particularly seating and table forms. It is also a popular technique in the worldwide production of furniture with frames made of heavy cane, which is commonly imported into European and Western shops.

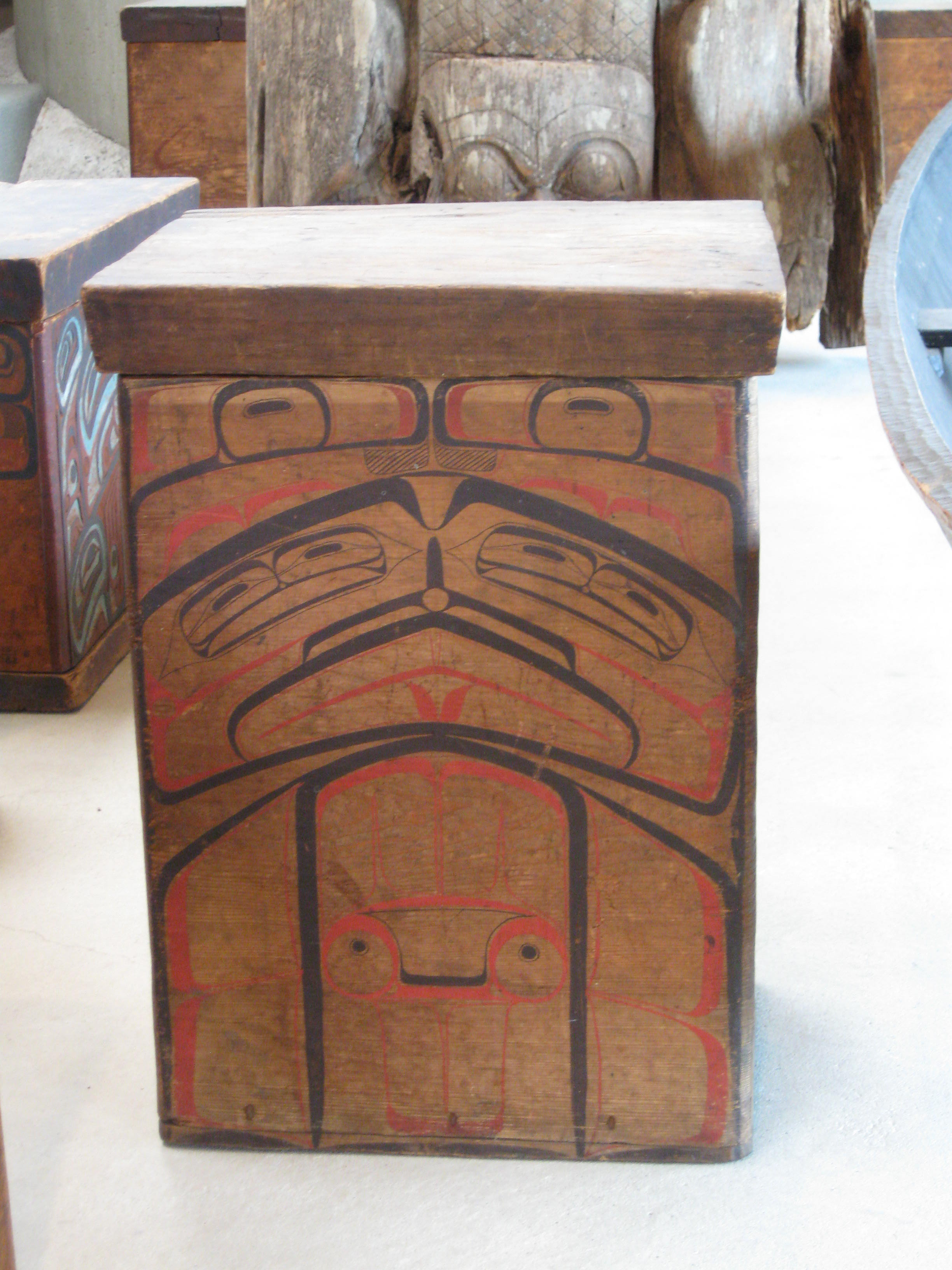
A red cedar Tsimshian bentwood box dating from the 1880s, on display at the UBC Museum of Anthropology

Bentwood boxes are a traditional item made by the First Nations people of the North American west coast including the Haida, Gitxsan, Tlingit, Tsimshian, Sugpiaq, Unangax, Yup'ik, Inupiaq and Coast Salish. These boxes are generally made out of one piece of wood that is steamed and bent to form a box. Traditional uses of the boxes varied - they included storage of food goods and of clothing, and for burial. They were often without decoration while others were decorated elaborately. Today many are made for collectors and can be purchased from museums, gift shops and online sites as well as directly commissioned from the artists.

The Aleut or Unangan people of Alaska made hunting visors, called chagudax, out of driftwood using the bentwood method. Hunters in kayaks used the visors - they are said to help keep sea spray off the face as well as to improve hearing. They were often decorated with paints, beads, sea-lion whiskers and ivory figurines. Andrew Gronholdt revived the art of chagudax in the 1980s. Present-day Unangan artists create chagudax for ceremonial purposes and offer them for sale to the public as well.

== See also ==
- Ercol
- Lucian Ercolani
- Twig work
- First Nations art
- Shaker-style pantry box
- Steam bending
