= Heat bending of wood =

Woodworking technique

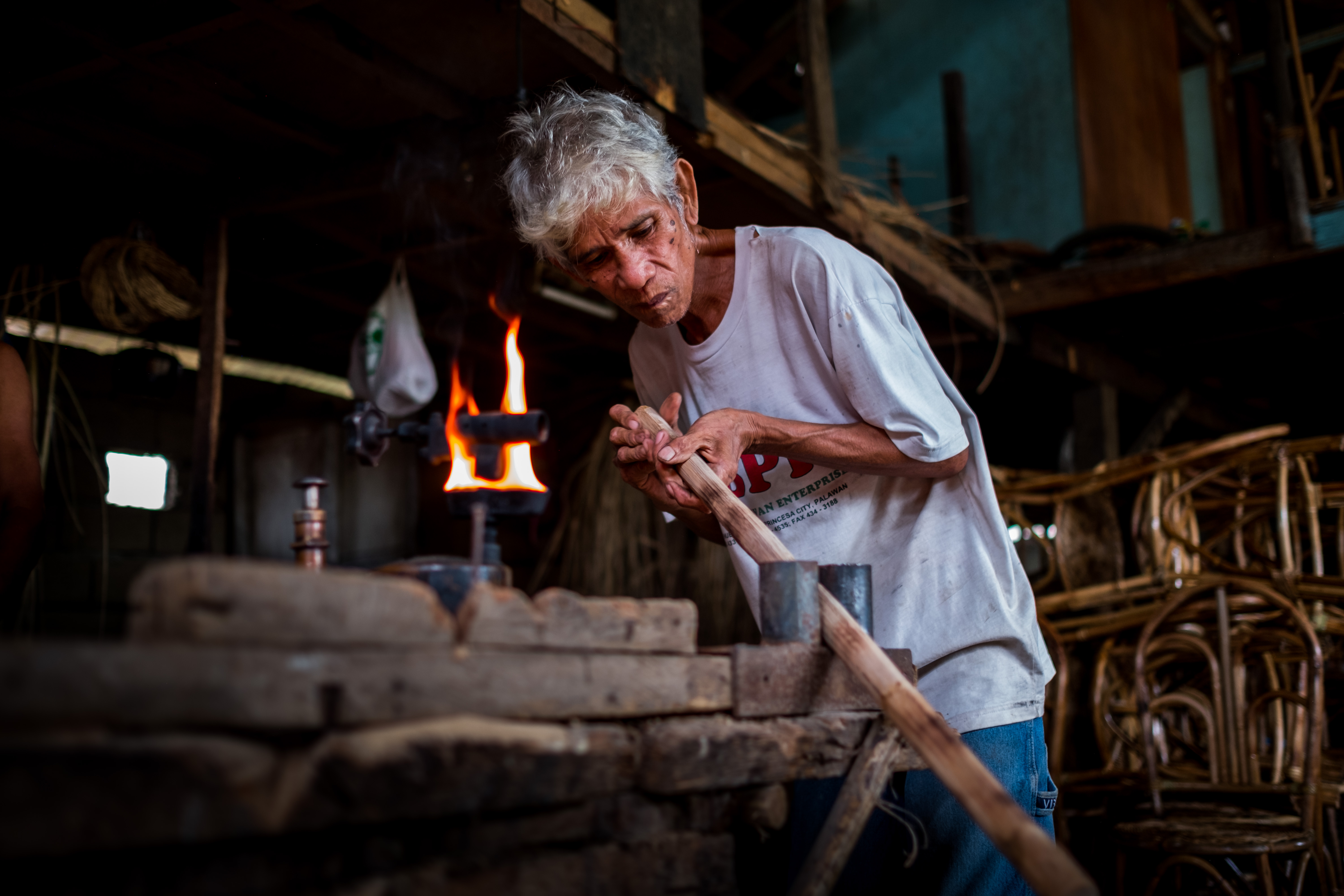
Craftsman in the Philippines heat bending rattan for furniture-making

Heat bending is the procedure of bending wood into different curves and shapes using moisture and a bending iron. By placing the wood into water, the moisture and heat from the bending iron will reform the structure of the wood, reorganizing the fibers of the wood to prevent the wood from springing back to its original state. This process is usually used for woodworking, as well as making the sides or "ribs" for stringed musical instruments.

== Description ==
Bending irons are most commonly electrically heated, therefore it is possible to control the heat output so as not to overheat the workpiece and change its chemical balance. The iron itself can be purchased in different shapes and sizes to better accommodate the needs of the operator. Some shapes include teardrop, round, and oval.

== Process ==
To properly bend wood, there are a few techniques that will help. The hardness of the wood will determine how long is required to soak the wood in water. The harder the wood, the more time is needed to fully soak the wood, making it easier to bend and preventing the wood from springing back to its original form. Popular hardwoods are oak, maple, cherry, birch, walnut, ash, and poplar. Common softwoods are pine, fir, spruce, hemlock, cedar, and redwood.

A metal mold, or former, placed on the back of the wood while heat bending can help ensure that all the bends and curves are done to the requirements of the project being made. Steel or iron are usually avoided, as iron can react with moist timber to produce rust staining, or some tannin-rich woods such as oak or chestnut will provide indelible blue-black iron tannates. After heat bending the wood, clamping the wood into a solid mold will reinforce the bends made to the wood while drying, preventing the wood from straightening while it dries.

== See also ==
- Steam bending of wood
- Shaker-style pantry box
