= Windsor Institute =

Trade school in New Hampshire, United States

Coordinates: 42°57′10.7″N 70°51′46.3″W

Information
- Closed: March 2016

The Windsor Institute was a school in Hampton, New Hampshire, United States. It was owned and operated by Michael Dunbar , where five-day courses in Windsor chairmaking were taught year round. The school had its final class, an "Early Philadelphia High Back Arm Chair", in March 2016.

== Students ==
Many students, from accomplished woodworkers to those who had never used a hammer, came from Great Britain, Korea, Argentina, Canada, Australia and many other countries, as well as from all parts of the United States, to study at the Windsor Institute. Students' country flags a\were flown outside the main shop during the course, and later displayed inside, in tribute to this internationalism.

Beginning students learned the basics of Windsor chairmaking in the Sack Back course, which prepared them for advanced classes.

== Chairmaker's Hall of Fame ==
The Chairmaker's Hall of Fame at the Windsor Institute recognizes students who improved on methods taught in the class or created new methods. Humorous names were sometimes given to these new inventions, such as the No-Name Stick, the Shot In The Back, and the VanHovenometer, reflecting the atmosphere of the workshop.
