= Shaker-style pantry box =

Round bentwood box made by hand

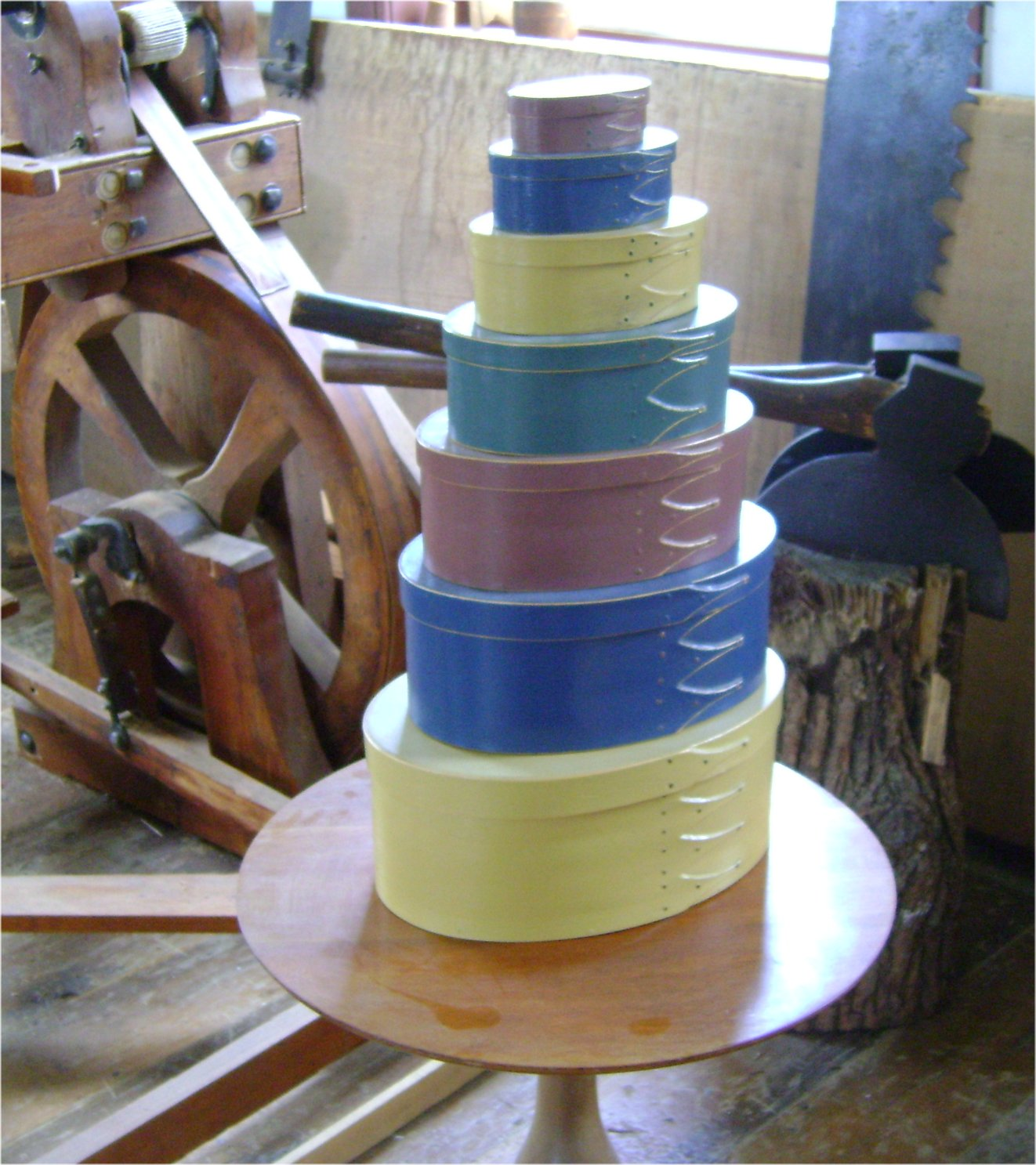
Shaker box tower

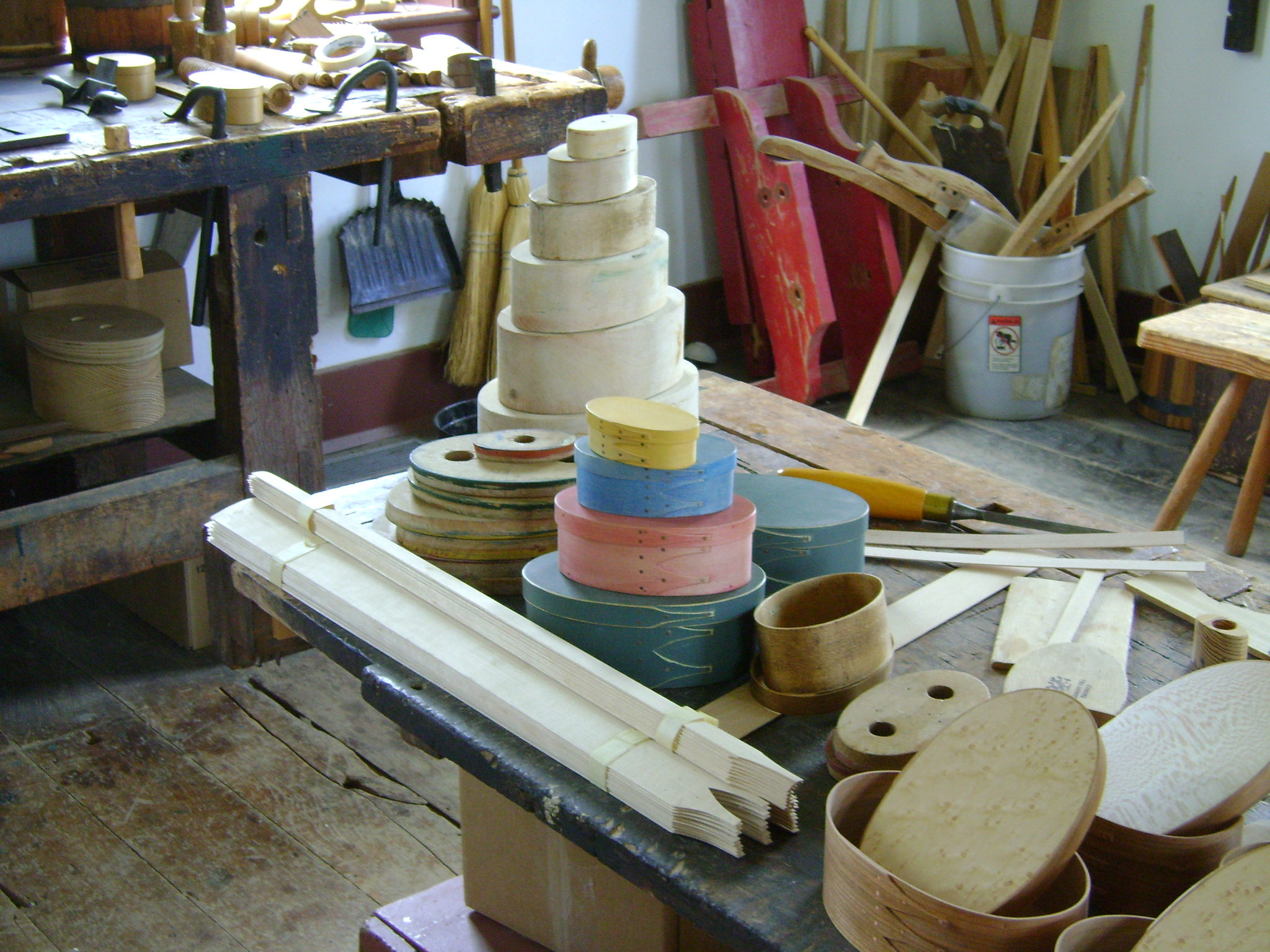
Shaker pantry box molds

The Shaker-style pantry box is a round bentwood box made by hand. Such boxes are "associated with Shaker folklife because they express the utility and uniformity valued in Shaker culture."

== Description ==
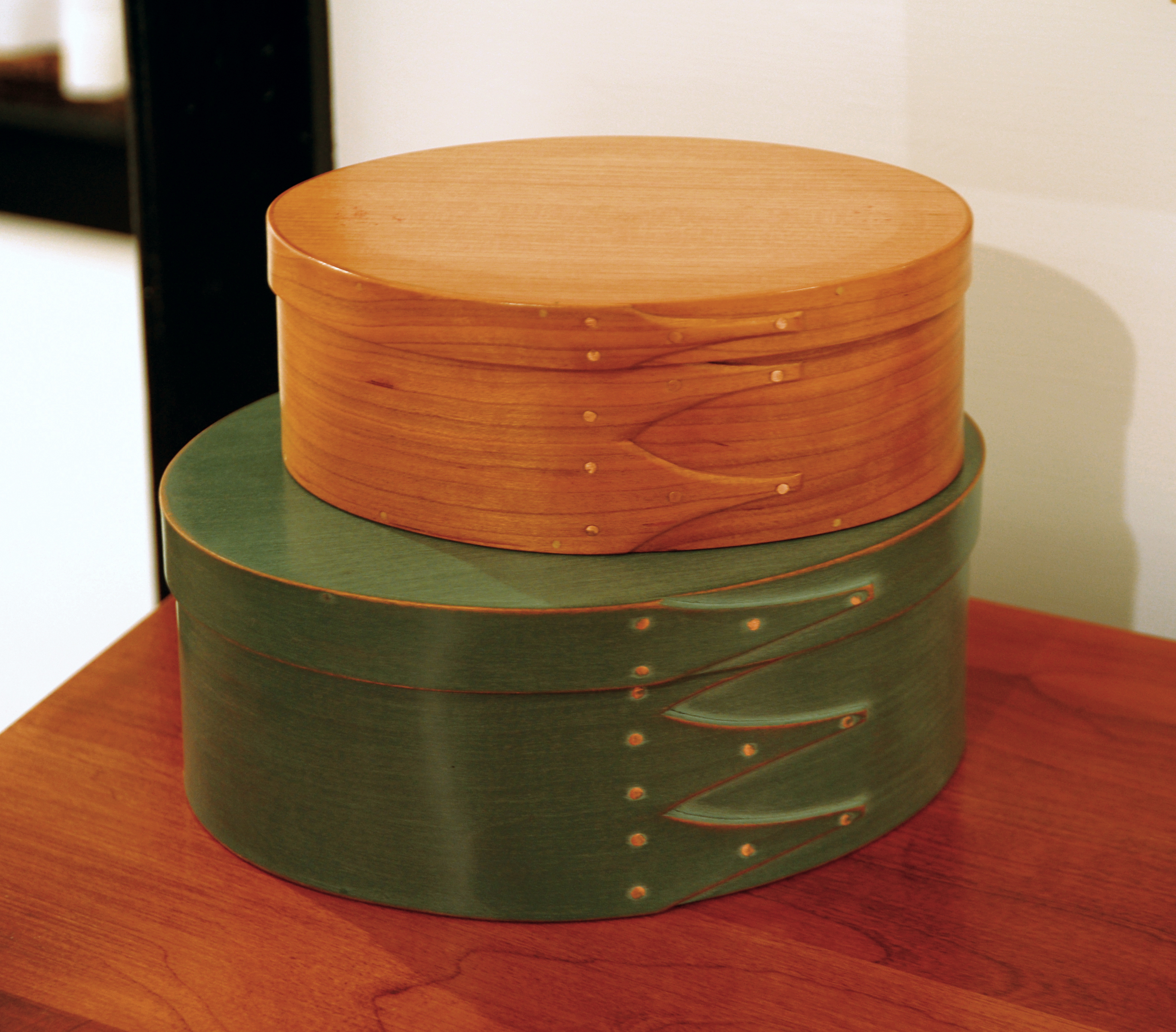
Shaker boxes' distinctive characteristic "swallowtails"

Shaker boxes were traditionally finished with milk paint made from milk casein, tinted with earth pigments. Milk paint is incredibly durable, lasting hundreds of years when used indoors.

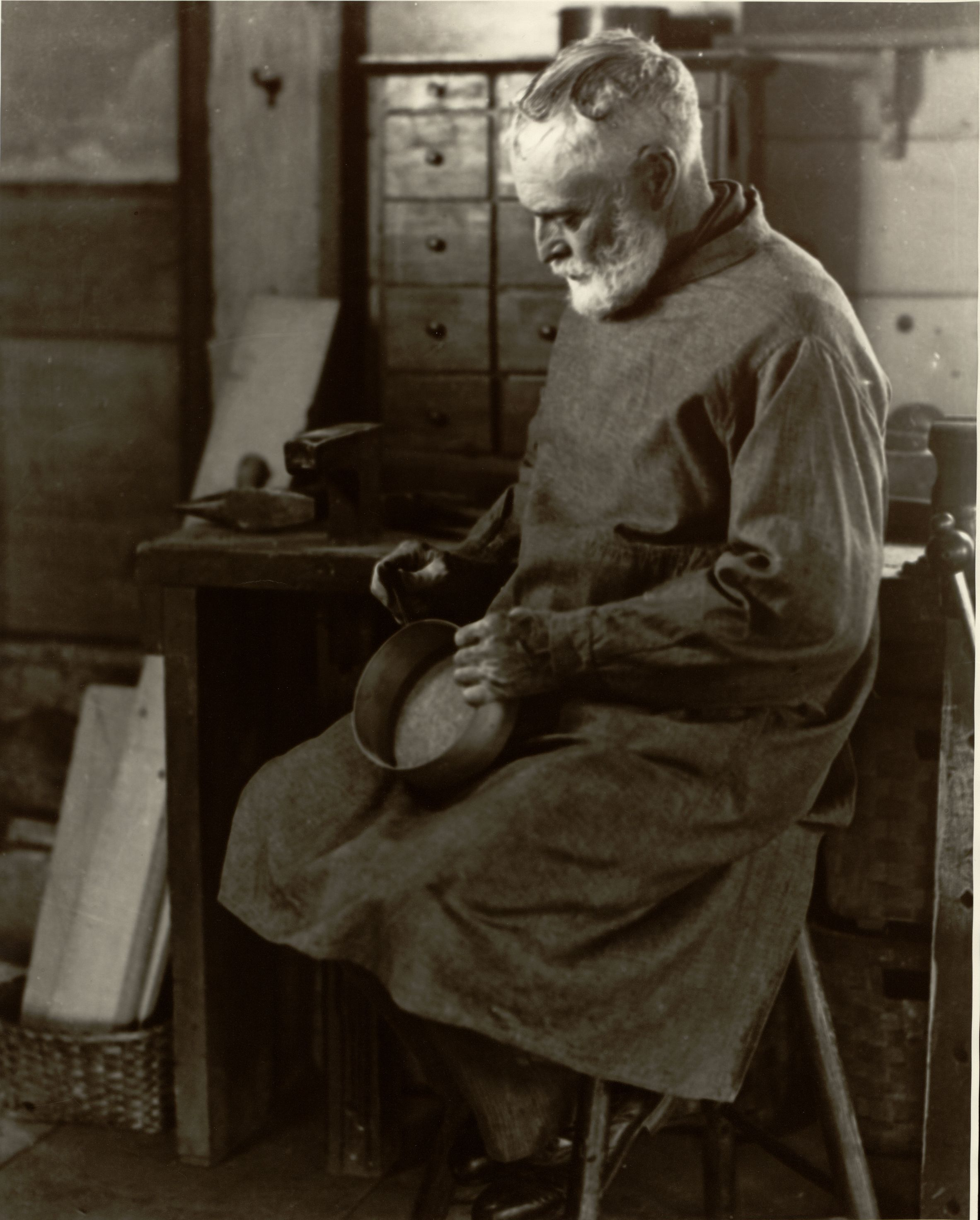
Brother Ricardo Belden making oval boxes in a workshop at the Hancock Shaker Village, Massachusetts in 1935

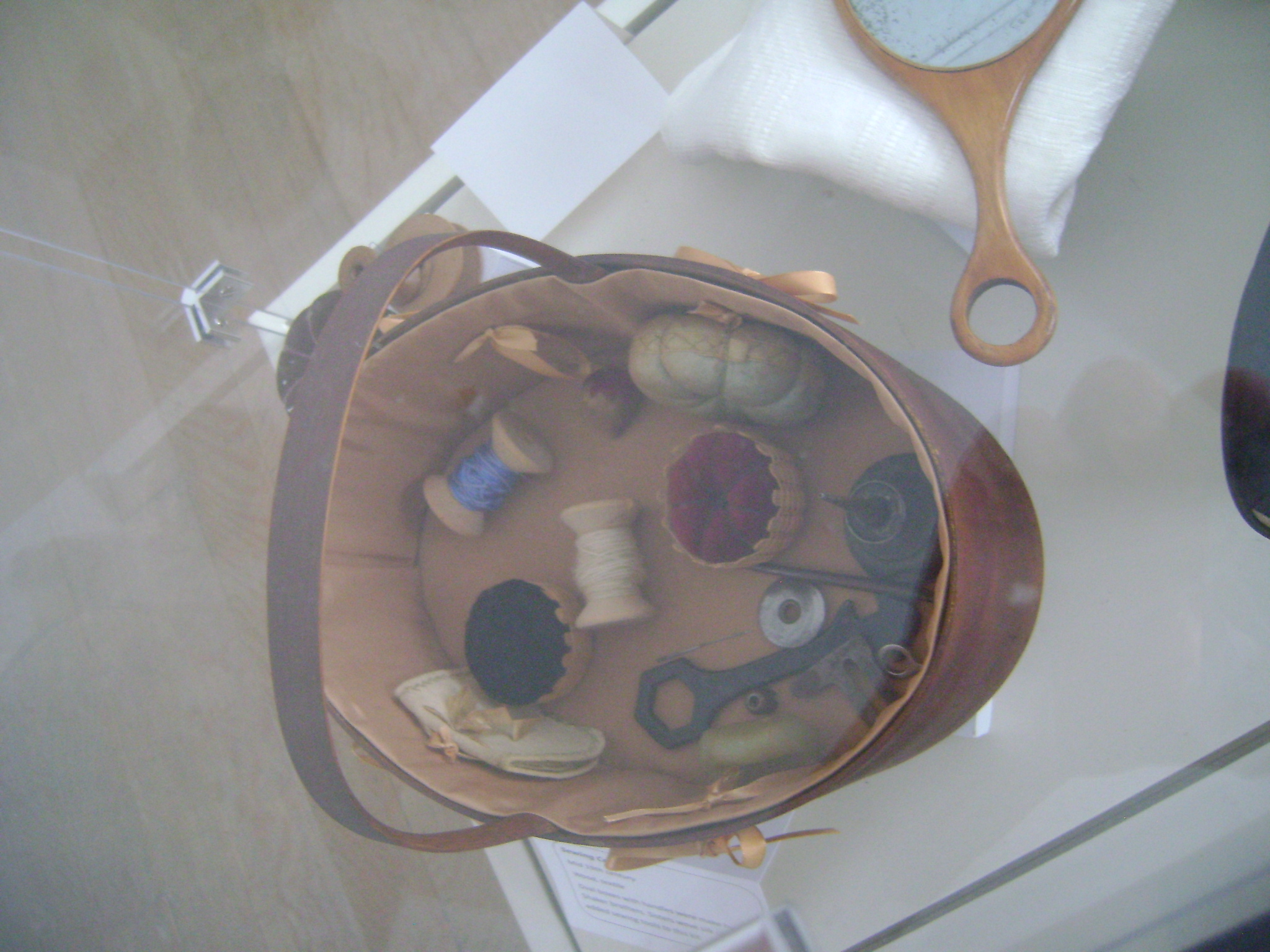
1990s lidless Shaker sewing carrier equipped with a pail handle

The concept continues to be meticulously honored by modern woodworkers, who are aware of the difficult process involved.

== See also ==
- Magewappa
- Joseph Wolfinger
- Steam bending

== Sources ==
- Handberg, Ejner P. (2007). Shop Drawings of Shaker Furniture. Vol. 3 (1st ed.). Countryman Press. ISBN 978-0881507775.
