= Unangan hunting headgear =

Wooden hats associated with the Unangan people

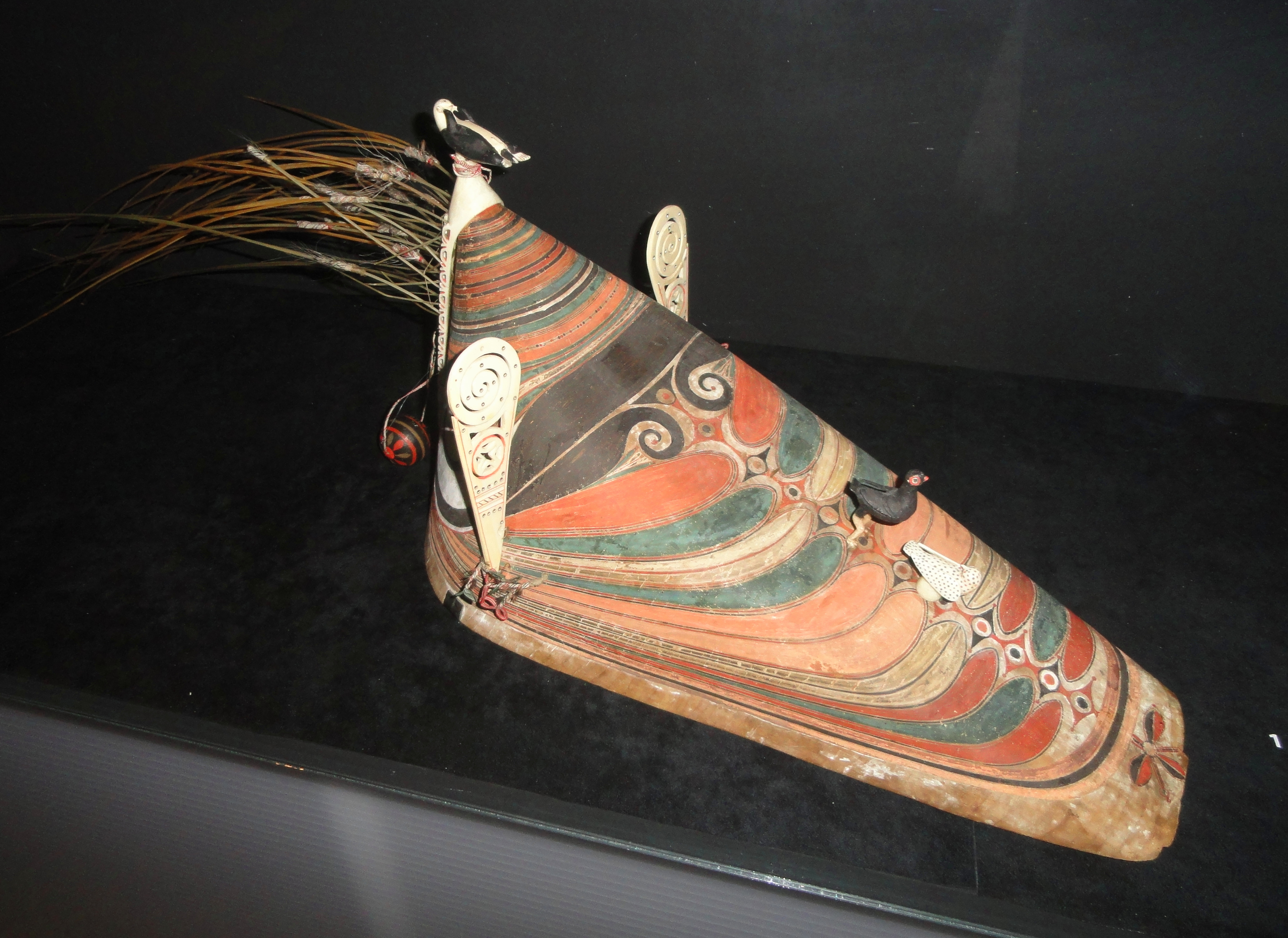
QayaatX̂uX̂, a closed-crown chief's hat from the Arvid Adolf Etholén Collection, National Museum of Finland, Helsinki.

Unangan hunting headgear are wooden hats associated with the Unangan or Unangas, the Indigenous peoples of what are currently known as the Aleutian Islands.

Also known as bentwood hats, and hunting hats, the headgear take the form as either closed crown conical hats, with long frontal bills; open crown hats, with long bills; or visors with short bills. Closed crown conical hats were historically worn by chiefs, whalers, and high-ranking sea hunters, while open crown hats and visors were worn by regular and lower-rank sea hunters.

These hats are recognized by their distinctive shape, elaborately painted designs and artistry, as well as their ornamentation with bone carvings and sea lion whiskers. Russian and European explorers collected many Unangan wooden hats in the late 18th and 19th century. These hats are now part of many museum collections around the world.

Since the 1980s, contemporary Alaska Native artists have spawned a resurgence creating this customary headgear.

== Types ==
The hats can be categorized into three types:

1. Qayaatx̂ux̂ (eastern Aleut dialect): meaning “chief’s hat, decorated, closed top, long wooden hat”. This was a closed crown, conical hat with long-billed front; it has also been classified as “classic Aleut” by some ethnographers.
2. Chagudax̂: (eastern Aleut dialect) meaning “wooden hat without a crown”. This is an open crown (no closed top) hat, with long-billed front.
3. Chagudax̂ (eastern Aleut dialect): meaning “wooden hat without a crown”. Similar to type 2, this is an open crown visor, but with a short billed front instead of a long-billed front. These were more common and worn by all seahunters.

== Origins and history ==
=== Development in the Kodiak Island region ===
Lydia T. Black states that Unanagan wooden headgear trace their origins to the Kodiak Island region. The headgear of this area, belonging to the Kodiak Alutiiq, developed through a combination of influences and adaptations from neighbouring Indigenous peoples including the Yup’ik (in the north-west of Alaska), the Tlingit and the Haida (in the north-west coast of Alaska and British Columbia).

The Kodiak Islanders adopted a similar hat shape to the Yup’ik, whose headgear were characterized by the closed crown hats. The style of peaked tops found in closed crown hats were influenced by the Tlingit, whose grass woven hats with split cylindrical tops indicated high-rank and privilege, and were reserved for chiefs. Stylized zoomorphic features on Kodiak hats were influenced by Haida headmasks, which featured carved animal heads.

By the mid 18th century when explorers had arrived in the Kodiak region, they remarked on seeing wooden headgear worn by the Indigenous peoples. They noted their use during festivals, times at sea, and also during trade with other peoples.

=== Introduction into the Aleutian Islands ===
With close regional proximity to Kodiak Island, the spread of headgear made its way its way into the eastern and central Aleutian Islands. This introduction was a slow movement; while visors were reported by explorers in the Shumagin Islands in 1741, the closed crown hats in the Aleutians were rare. The price of one chief's hat was the equivalent to 1 to 3 slaves, which was more than a baidarka (kayak).

Further spread into the Aleutian region is likely due to the whaling hunt, which was a widespread practice among the Kodiak Alutiiq and Sugpiat. For the Kodiak Alutiiq and Sugpiat, whaling was a highly spiritual and ritualistic practice; whalers were both avoided and revered for going on such dangerous missions. From the time prior to the hunt to the time after the hunt and cleansing, whalers were eschewed; however outside of the hunt they were respected within the community for their ability to capture such a large sea mammal that contributed to survival of the community.

Lydia T. Black notes that whaling was introduced to two islands, Four Mountain Island and Unalaska Island (via Krenitzen Island). On Unalaska Island, the first record of a closed crown hat was noted by Carl Heinrich Merck in 1778 when Unangans were seen capturing a whale. Black notes that a few years later headgear were seen at Atka Island, where some Kodiak Alutiiq had settled. Similar to the Kodiak Alutiiq, whaling for the Unangan people was highly valued within the community, as the kill was shared amongst members. Unangan hunters and whalers who participated in the practice were highly regarded; they often answered to the chiefs, as chiefs decided when whalers would go out on the waters.

By the 19th century, further recordings of the headgear were noted by other explorers. During his voyage to Unalaska Island in 1805, German naturalist, explorer, and Russian diplomat, Georg Heinrich von Langsdorff described a qayaatX̂uX̂ chief's hat saying that "the most elegant and expensive headdress is a pointed wooden hat with an umbrella-like projection over the eyes and is rounded cap-like in the back”.

Dating prior to contact, and with a long evolution that led to the development of stylized elements, Russian scholar S. A. Ivanov argues that Unangan headgear reached a pinnacle of design sophistication due to the relative isolation of the Aleutian Islands.

== Purpose ==
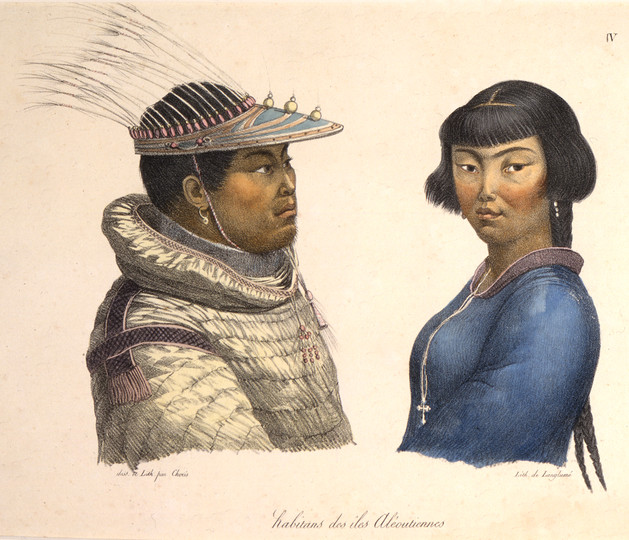
Drawing of an Unangan man wearing a ChagudaX̂ visor. A portrait of a man and a woman from the Aleutian Islands, 1822. Ludovik Choris, Anchorage Museum, 81.68.4.

Male Unangan sea hunters, whalers, and chiefs wore the long billed open crown hats classified as chagudaX̂. Regular ranking hunters wore the more common open crown visors (also called chagudaX̂), which had a shorter bill. The visor served to shield the glare of sunlight on the sea, and spray of water. Younger male hunters wore the short billed visors; and as a hunter matured in age, they would graduate to the longer-billed visor. As Russian ethnographer Rosa G. Liapunova has indicated, visors decorated with sea lion whiskers indicated the hunting abilities of the wearer; the more whiskers, the better the hunter.

Closed crown hats classified as qayaatX̂uX̂ were worn by exceptional hunters, whalers and chiefs. Denoted by the shape of their pointed tops, these hats marked the whaler's and chief's place in society as respected members; the hats differentiated them from regular members of the community. Similar to short- and long-billed visors, these hats blocked the glare of sunlight and water. When not as sea, chiefs wore the closed crown hats during festivals and during visits to other villages.

== Creation process ==
Unangan hat makers constructed headgear through a time- and labour-intensive process that began with finding and obtaining wood. Since wood is scarce in the Arctic region, Unangans placed high value in its rarity. Finding a piece large enough was often acquired from a stump that had washed ashore, usually spruce, cedar or birch. The makers carefully cut and scraped out the found wood into a plank board, so that it was thin and flexible enough to bend into shape; this process could take up to a week. From there the makers steamed and softened the planks by using hot stones and pouring water over the wooden piece. They would then shape the wood into an asymmetrical visor or conical hat, with the intention of the longer side projecting over the eyes of the wearer. The Unangan makers would fasten the ends together at the back of the hat using sinew or baleen threads. They would further decorate the headgear with paint, as well as volutes, figurines, and sea lion whiskers, depending on the level of elaboration.

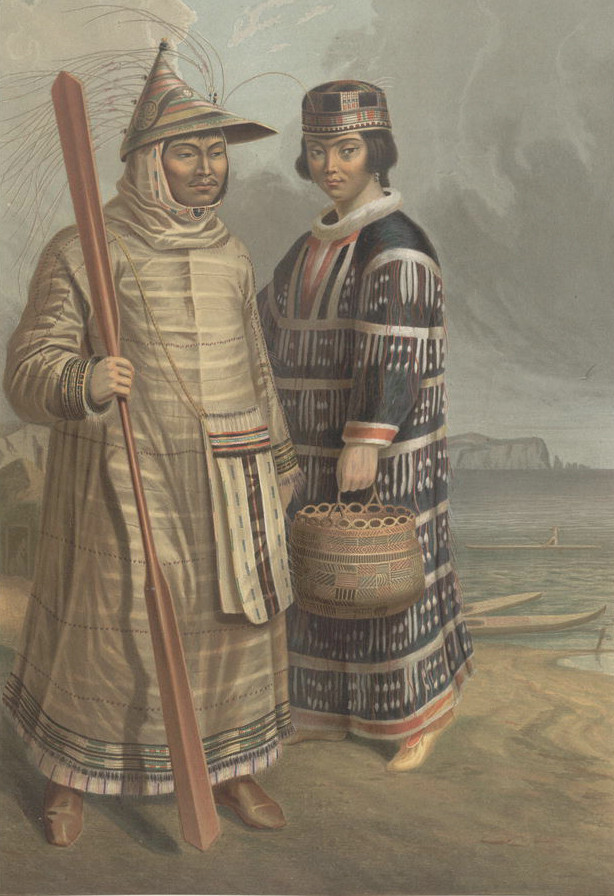
Painting of man dressed in ceremonial attire, wearing QayaatX̂u, closed crown chief's hat.

== Design and ornamentation ==
=== Painting ===
Unangan hat makers painted the headgear with an undercoat base of white paint, and then added to it with a second coat of colour; the inside was painted in red. Paints were mostly made with mineral pigments and on rare occasions with plant-based pigments; they were mixed and with bodily fluids such as blood plasma or nasal mucus as a binding agent. In his journal recordings from a Russian scientific expedition, German naturalist Carl Heinrich Merck stated that colours such as black were obtained from mainland Alaska; while white was found near volcanic vents or through trade; green, red, and yellow were produced with the ochre clay found in pond water. Blue was created by mixing together green and black.

Painted designs included horizontal bands of colour, dots, closed and open curves, spirals, and on occasion representational drawings.

=== Volutes ===
For more elaborate designs on conical hats, Unangan headgear makers would add carved bone plates, also called volutes, to the backs and sides. These plates covered the back seam where the wooden piece was bound, adding sturdiness to the hat. It was also the location where sea lion whiskers or beads would be inserted. On the sides, makers would add a carved plate near the wearer's temple; it had a long trianglual shape with a rounded circle at the end. S. V. Ivanov hypothesizes that this shape is a stylized bird head. Whiskers were also inserted on the side to the bone plates.

=== Figurines ===
Unangan headgear makers also added small bone carved figurines to the tops of hats; these could be in the shape of birds or of other sea mammals like otters. The figurines could also resemble human beings. Georg Heinrich von Langsdorff's recorded observations note these figurines as being made of walrus tusk.

=== Sea lion whiskers ===
To indicate the abilities of a hunter, Unangan hat makers added sea lion whiskers to hats and visors; the more decorated a hat, the more skilled the hunter. The location of whiskers was placed on the opposite side as the hunter's throwing arm, as to not get in the way of any hunting tools, such as a harpoon, when throwing. A right-handed whaler would have the whiskers placed on the left side; a left-handed hunter would have the whiskers attached on the right side.

== Contemporary revival ==
In the 1980s, the art of making bentwood hats was revived by Andrew Gronholdt, a retired boat builder, who researched the construction methods and techniques to produce the headgear. More recently, Unangan artist Okalena Patricia Lekanoff Gregory, who studied under Gronholdt, has demonstrated making hats at universities and the Smithsonian.
