= Windsor chair =

Type of chair with a solid wood seat and turned legs

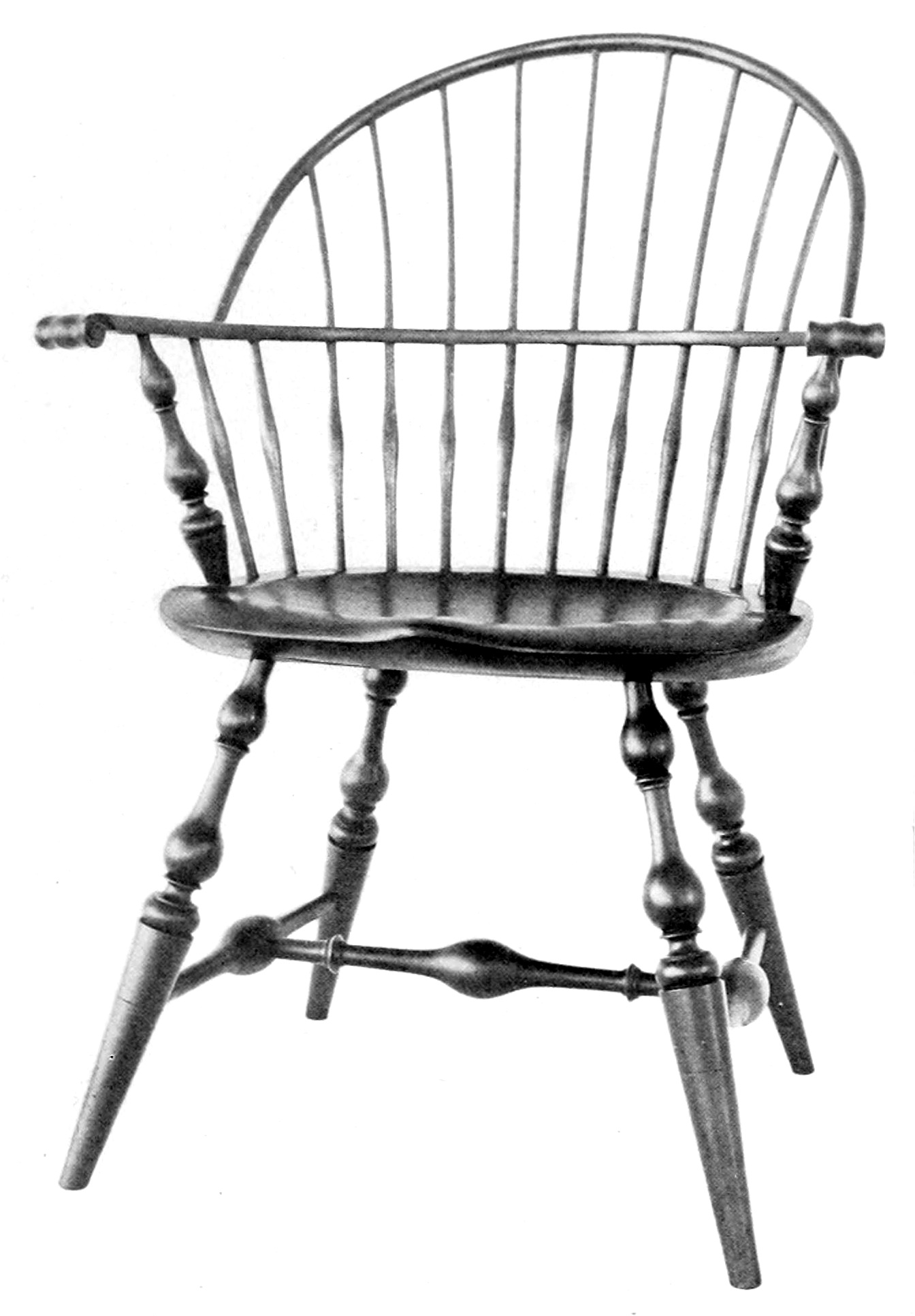
A sack-back Windsor armchair by Wallace Nutting

A Windsor chair is a chair built with a solid wooden seat into which the chair-back and legs are round-tenoned, or pushed into drilled holes, in contrast to other styles of chairs whose back legs and back uprights are continuous. The seats of Windsor chairs are often carved into a shallow dish or saddle shape for comfort. Traditionally, the legs, stretchers, and uprights (or spindles) were usually turned on a pole lathe. Spindles may also be carved, using drawknives and spokeshaves. The back and sometimes the arm pieces (if present) are formed from steam bent pieces of wood. Traditional Windsors are typically painted, primarily to hide the different types of wood used in construction, based on their characteristics.

A Windsor chair is actually defined by how the different component parts are assembled. It does not relate to where it was made or to any one particular style of chair.

== History ==
It is not clear when the first Windsor chairs were made. There is evidence of the "stick" construction of stools in the art of Ancient Egypt, more than three thousand years before a recognisable Windsor design evolved. The modern Windsor design emerged as early as the 16th century in England when wheelwrights started coping out chair spindles in the same way they made wheel spokes. This design was probably a development of West Country, Welsh and Irish 'stick-back' chairs, but the evidence on origin is not certain.

During the early eighteenth century in the country estates of England, gardens became places of entertainment, so the large static rustic seats of previous times, gave way to the need for portable seating. The Windsor chair fulfilled this need. An early reference to a Windsor chair was in 1718 when the landscape gardener, Stephen Switzer in his Ichnographia Rustica, during his description of a 'walk' through the country estate of William Blathwayt refers to:

..a large Seat, call'd a Windsor Seat which is contriv'd to turn round any Way, either for the Advantage of the Prospect to avoid the Inconveniences of Wind, the Sun &c'

— Switzer 1718, p. 125

Historically, the manufacture of Windsor chairs was in the county of Buckinghamshire, with High Wycombe becoming the centre of production. The first Windsors were of the comb-back variety and by the 18th century, steam bending was being used to produce their characteristic "bow". The first chairs made this way were shipped to London from the market town of Windsor, Berkshire in 1724. There is speculation that the chair derives its name from Windsor, which became the centre for trade between the producers and the London dealers. Thus, the name "Windsor Chair" is more about the style of chair than where it was made, with many diverse forms of Windsor chair being made worldwide.

Traditionally, three types of craftsmen were involved in the construction of a Windsor chair. There was the chair bodger, an itinerant craftsman who worked in the woods and made the legs and stretchers, on a pole lathe. Then there was the benchman who worked in a small town or village workshop and would produce the seats, backsplats and other sawn parts. The final craftsman involved was the framer. The framer would take the components produced by the bodger and the benchman and would assemble and finish the chair.

English settlers introduced the Windsor chair to North America, with the earliest known chairs being imported by Patrick Gordon who became lieutenant governor of Pennsylvania in 1726. There is speculation that the first American Windsor chair, based on the traditional British design, was made in Philadelphia in 1730.

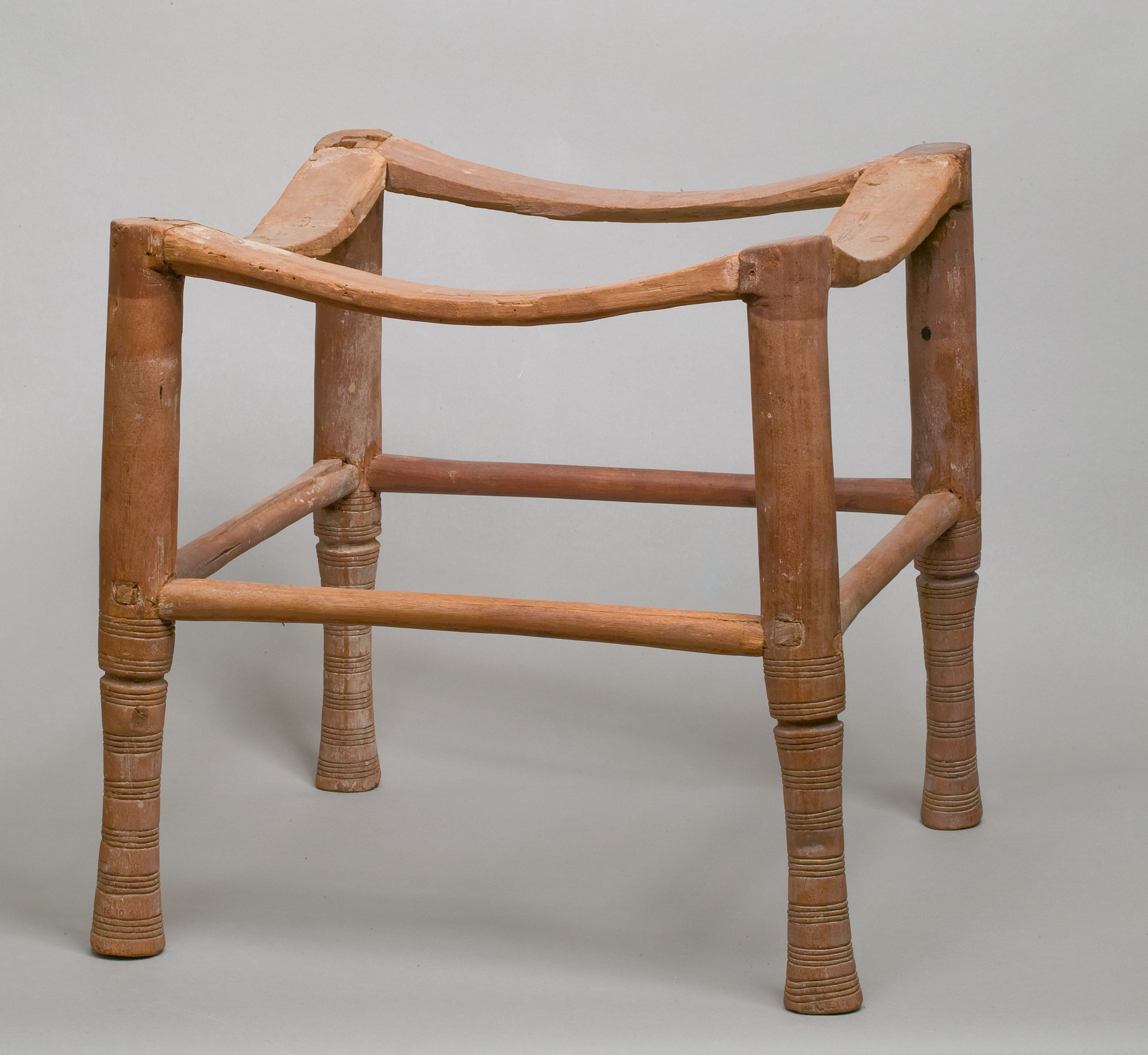
A "stick" constructed stool, discovered as part of the Carnarvon Excavations of Upper Egypt. Believed to come from the Middle Kingdom period of Ancient Egypt.

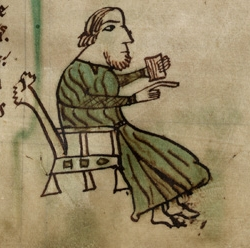
A judge sitting on a chair in the Laws of Hywel Dda, a 13th century manuscript (MS. Peniarth 28). This is the earliest known depiction of the Welsh 'stick-back' chair. The design of the Windsor chair was possibly a development of this.

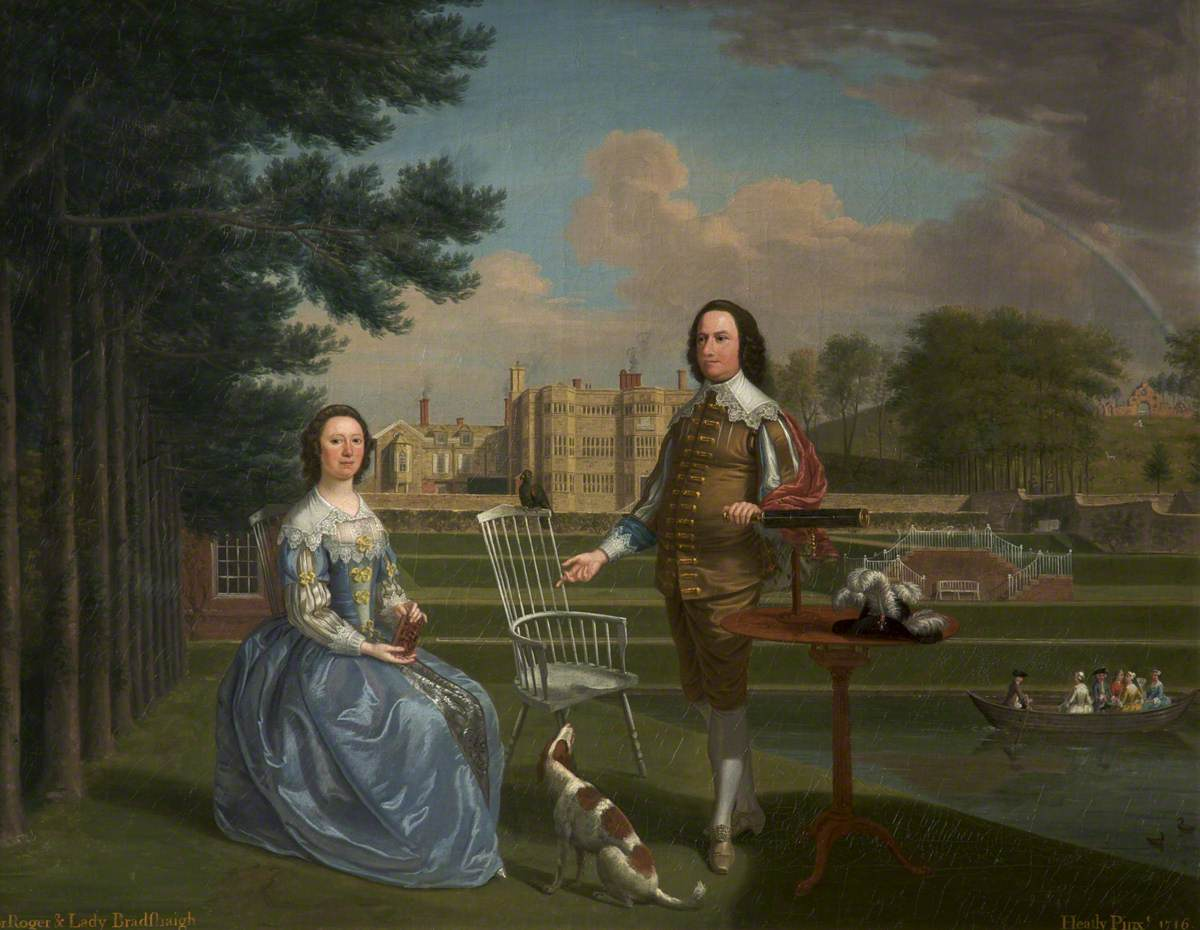
Painting of Sir Roger and Lady Bradshaigh by Edward Haytley (active 1740–1764), with what is thought to be one of the earliest depictions of a Windsor chair.

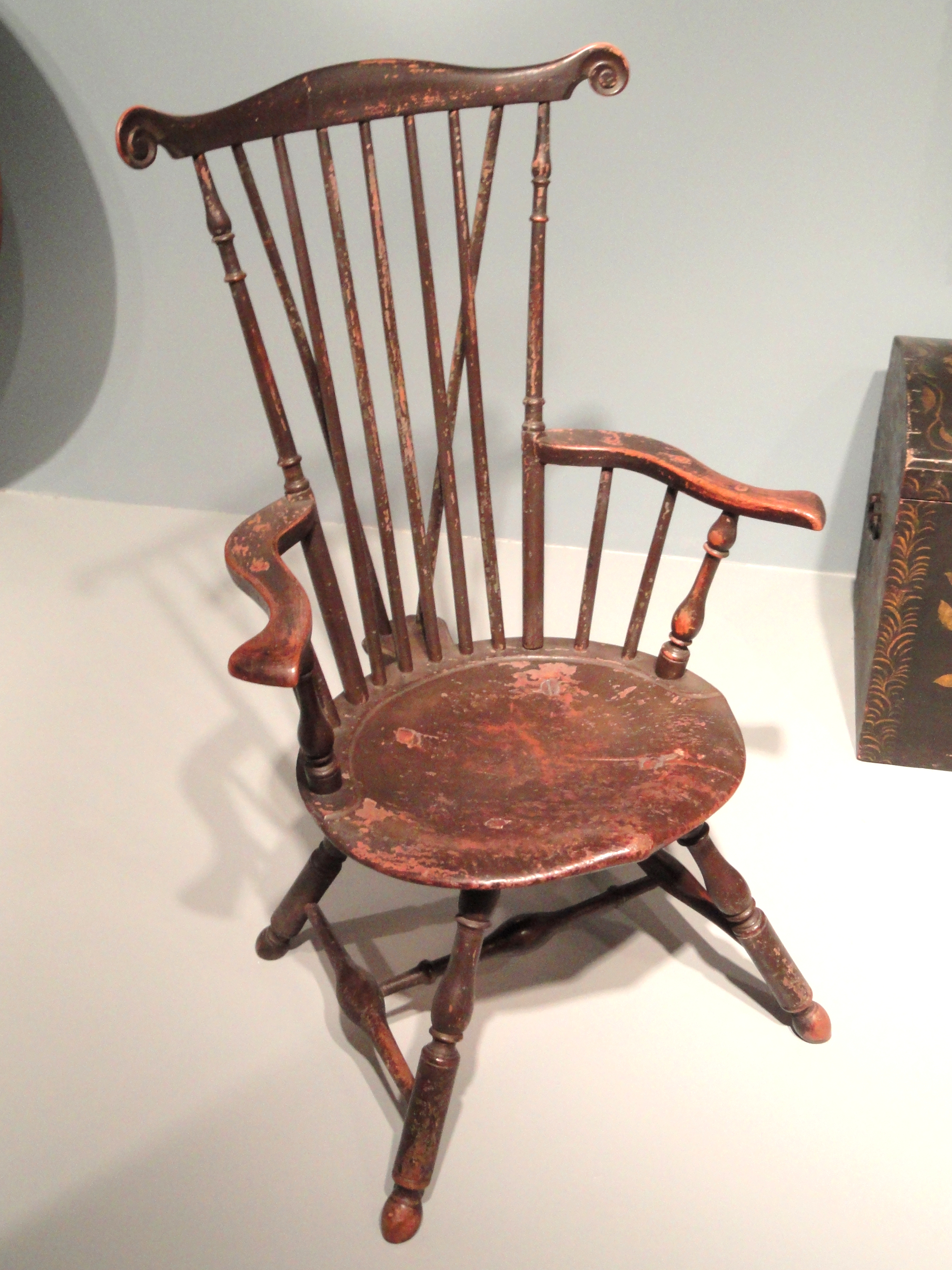
American Windsor Chair, Philadelphia 1760-1770.

== Forms and construction ==
There are about seven distinctive forms: sack-back, hoopback, comb-back, continuous arm, low back, rod back, and fan back.

Sack-back Windsor Armchair also known as a double Windsor

Comb-back Windsor armchair

Comb-back Windsor Armchair

Comb-back Windsor writing chair

Ricker Fanback Windsor side chair

Lyman Mower Windsor side chair

It is common to find American Windsors made in the 18th century that contain three different species of wood. Pine, bass or tulip poplar are common for the seat. Non ring porous hardwoods such as Maple are stiff and make crisp turnings, and were used for the undercarriage. Ring porous species such as Oak, ash, and hickory all rive (split) and steam bend nicely. These woods are also straight grained and flexible and thus work well for slender parts such as the spindles.

The seat of a Windsor chair is an essential part since it provides the stability to both the upper and lower portions. The thickness of the seat allows the legs to be anchored securely into their respective tapered sockets, providing the undercarriage with strength and stability. A timber that will provide the strength and stability whilst also allowing it to be shaped, in order to achieve the desired look and feel, requires a strong durable timber, with interlocking grain, to provide the right characteristics. English Windsors typically have elm seats because its interlocking grain gives good cross-grain strength that resists splitting where holes are placed close to the edge of a seat. There are no real satisfactory alternatives to elm although other woods have been tried, for example, oak and ash in Britain and various types of pine in the USA. Because of elm's strength compared to pine, tulip poplar or bass, English Windsor chair seats are usually not as thick as American Windsors. The English Windsor chair seats are not saddled (or dished) as deeply as their American counterparts- partly because of elm's relative strength, and partly because elm is comparatively more difficult to sculpt than the softer woods chosen by American chair makers. Woodwrights use tools such as the adze, scorp or inshave to form the hollowed out, form fitting, ergonomic top of the seat.

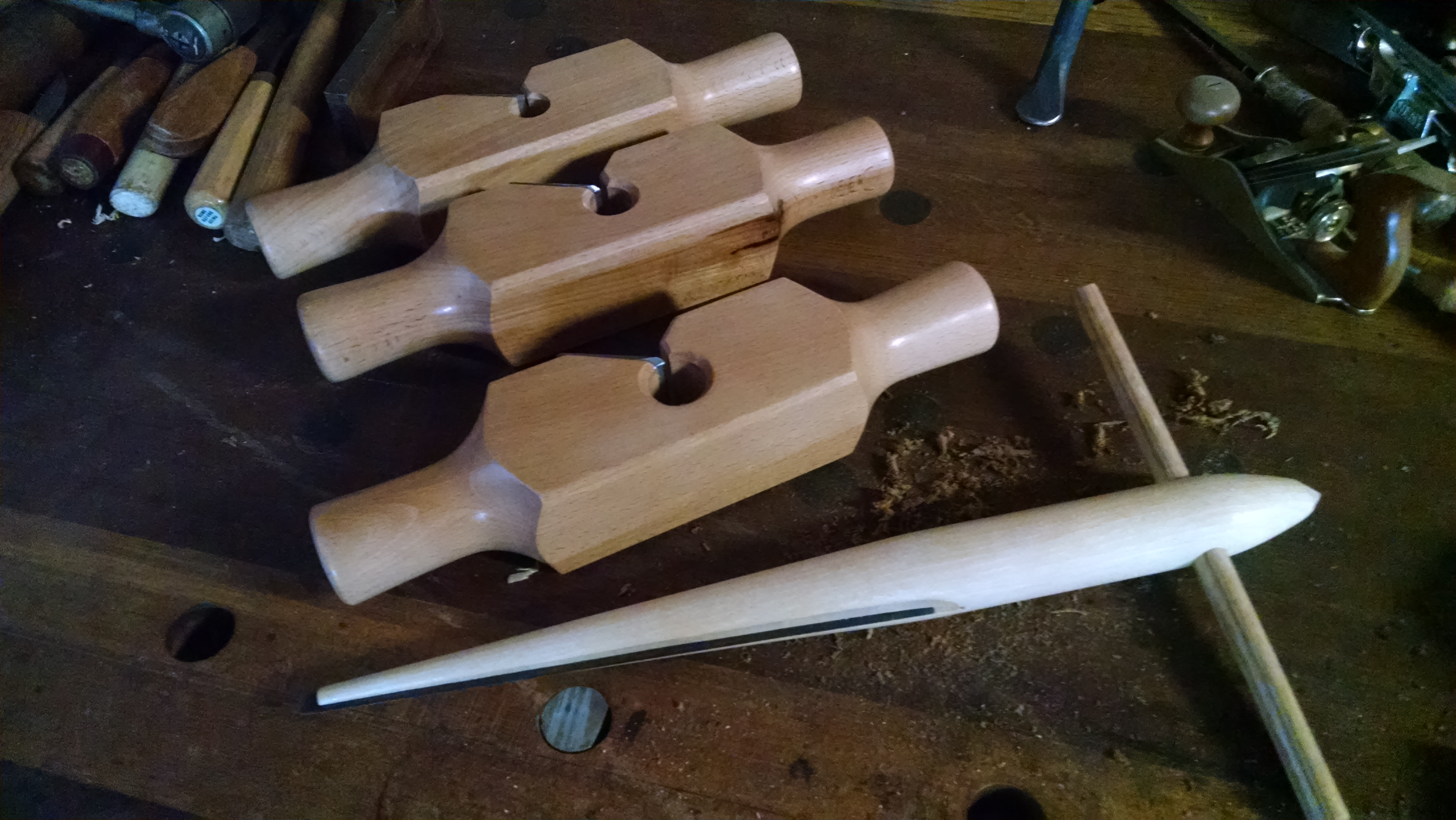
Modern tools for producing a Windsor chair. From bottom to top: six-degree reamer, a leg tenon cutter, an arm-stump tenon cutter, and a 1/2 inch (13 mm) spindle tenon cutter.

The legs are splayed at angles fore-and-aft (rake) as well as side-to-side (splay) to provide actual and visual support of the person sitting. Early chairs made in America usually have stretchers connecting the front and back legs and a cross stretcher connecting the two side stretchers, creating what is known as an "H" stretcher assembly. A common misconception about this assembly is that the stretchers hold the legs together to keep them from pulling apart. In the traditional Windsor design, the wedged tenon joints which join each leg to the seat are inherently strong enough to prevent the legs from creeping outward. The stretcher system actually pushes the legs apart to retain the necessary tension which reduces slack.

"Through-holed and wedged" is one of the primary means of joining Windsor chair parts. A cylindrical or slightly tapered hole is bored in the first piece, the matching cylindrical or tapered end of the second piece is inserted in the hole as a round tenon, and a wedge is driven into the end of this tenon, flaring it tight in the hole. The excess portion of the wedge is then cut flush with the surface. This supplies a mechanical hold that will prevail when the glue fails. In general, early Windsor chair joints are held together mechanically, making glue a redundant detail in their assembly.

Assembling wedged tenon joints

Driving the spindle home.

Driving the wedge into the tenon.

Completed wedges, awaiting trimming.

== Painted finishes ==
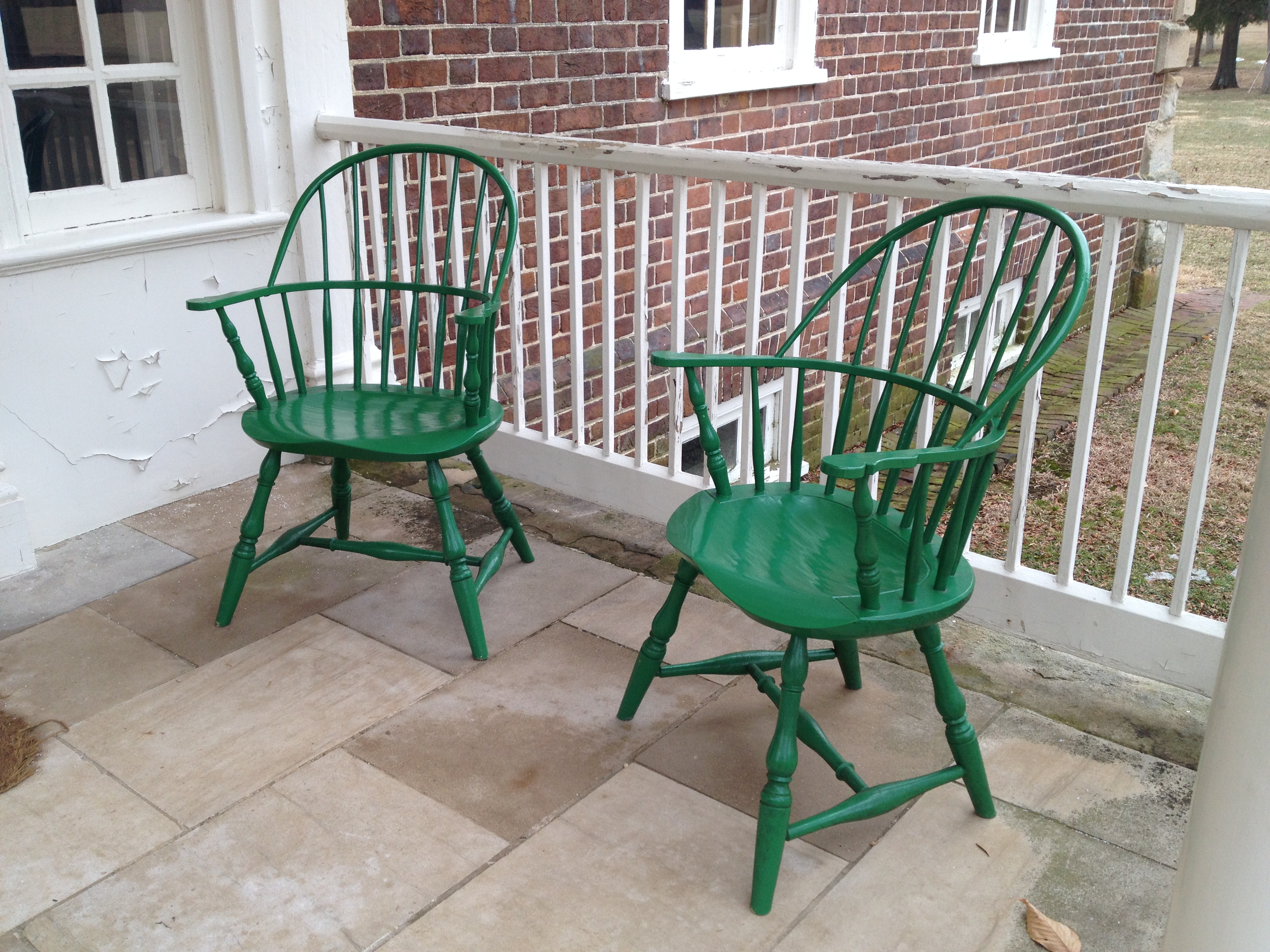
A pair of painted Windsors at Gunston Hall, Virginia.

Early British Windsors that were used as garden seats were often painted green to waterproof them, later indoor versions were stained and polished. American Windsors were usually painted, in the 18th century they were grain painted with a light color, then overpainted with a dark color before being coated with linseed oil for protection of the fragile paint. In the 19th century settlers from the mid-west of America to Ontario, Canada would coat their chairs with the solid primary colours of milk paint, a mix of buttermilk, turpentine and cow's blood.

During the early 19th century the United States produced vast numbers of chairs, in factories, and an experienced factory painter could paint a chair in less than five minutes. By mid-century, to save production costs, the chair was painted in solid colours with some simple stencilling being the only design.

With wear in use, the paint wears off around the edges and displays a characteristic wear pattern that reveals the paint colors underneath. As for any antique, this original finish often survives best in unworn areas such as the bottom of the seat or around turnings. Later repainting, even well-intentioned restoration, will diminish the value of an original finish.

== See also ==
- High Wycombe Chair Making Museum
- List of chairs
- Windsor Institute
- Wycombe Museum
