= Andrew Gronholdt =

American sculptor

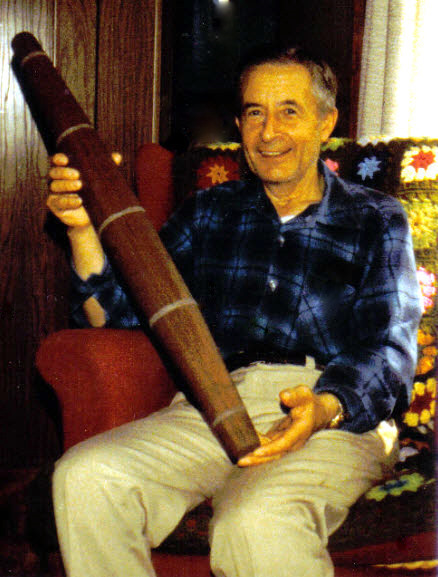
- Andrew Gronholdt holding a chxuusi-x
- Born: 26 August 1915; Sand Point, Alaska, Popof Island, United States
- Died: 13 March 1998 (aged 82); Edmonds, Washington
- Education: Self-taught
- Known for: woodworking, chagudax-carving
- Notable work: "Chagudax: A Small Window into the Life of an Aleut Bentwood Hat Carver" 2012
- Movement: Reviving Aleut Bentwood Hat Carving
- Awards: Shareholder of the Year, Aleut Corporation, 1989
- Elected: Board of Directors, Shumagin Corporation, 1972-1974; Board of Directors of the Aleut Corporation, 1977-1998
- Patrons: Aleut Corporation, Shumagin Corporation, Anchorage International Airport, Anchorage Museum
- Website: http://www.andrewgronholdt.com/

Andrew Gronholdt (26 August 1915 – 13 March 1998) was a famous Aleut from Sand Point, Alaska, in the Shumagin Islands south of the lower Alaska Peninsula and became famous for rejuvenating the ancient Unangan art of carving hunting hats called chagudax. In January 2012, a book was published posthumously by Gronholdt titled "Chagudax: A Small Window into the Life of An Aleut Bentwood Hat Carver" Gronholdt's woodworking techniques, wood steaming and bending methods, and instructional design methodologies were legendary.

== Early life ==
Andrew Gronholdt was born on 26 August 1915, in Sand Point on Popof Island in the Shumagin Islands. Gronholdt's father was Niels Peter Gronholdt from Kerteminde, Denmark. Gronholdt's mother is Anna Dushkin, who was from a tiny Aleut village on the southside of the Alaska Peninsula named Belkofski, about a dozen miles north east of King Cove, Alaska. The ancient Unangan people lived at Belkofski for thousands of years, but the community was closed about 1980 when everyone moved out, mostly to King Cove.

Andrew began attending elementary school in Belkofski and later completed grade school in Sand Point in the Shumagin Islands. Graduation from eighth grade at Sand Point School ended Gronholdt's formal education, but "his own desire to discover and explore schooled him for the rest of his life".

On 21 January 1942, at Unga, Gronholdt married Elisabeth Z. Rodgers, the daughter of Frank Rodgers and Zenia Lois Larsen. They had one child, born in Seward.

== Chagudax ==
While living in Sand Point on Popof Island in the Shumagin Islands amongst the members of the Qagun Tayagungin Tribe, the Unga Tribe, and the Pauloff Harbor Tribe, Gronholdt designed chagudax (the ancient Unangan word for "hunting visor") in the Aleutians. Based upon the elaborate design of his maritime hunting ancestors, Gronholdt carved slabs of wood into thin blanks which he steamed and bent over molds to form the complex shapes of these ancient bentwood hats.

He began researching hat construction methods in 1985. Gronholdt, believing that the creation of these bentwood hunting hats was an important component of the ancient Unangan culture, went from Sand Point to several other communities within the Aleutians, teaching others this lost art. Gronholdt taught at several schools including Sand Point and Unalaska. Gronholdt's students teach chagudax at Aleut cultural camps. The chagudax classes are well attended, often filled to the limit. Students cherish the chagudax which they carved, steamed, and bent. They carry them home with a deep sense of cultural pride as a symbol of ancient Aleut ways.

The chagudax was an important component of the Unangan sea kayaker's hunting and battle uniform. The sight of a fleet of Aleut men, fully dressed in battle uniform with their chagudax and the decks of their sea kayaks bristling with razor sharp spears with which they were deadly accurate at long distances, struck fear into the hearts of enemies and excitement into the hearts of Aleut women. "All travelers are unanimous in stating that the Aleut in full attire and in his baidarka has a handsome and indeed a majestic appearance"(p. 275)

Gronholdt's visors are featured in collections at the Anchorage International Airport, the Unalaska City School Percent for Art, the Shumagin Corporation and the Aleutian/Pribilof Islands Association.

== Gronholdt's other skills ==
Gronholdt had a background as a wooden boat builder. He also crafted wooden pumps, known as chxuusi-x, which was used to bail water out of the skin-on-frame iqyax, the Aleut sea kayaks.

== Civic life ==
Gronholdt believed in the importance of the Aleut people getting involved and voicing their opinion to help make the community better, serving on the board of directors for the Shumagin Corporation (1972 through 1974) and serving for over 21 years (1977 through 1998) on the board of directors in several positions at the Aleut Corporation.

== Wood bending traditions ==
In September 1989, Gronholdt was chosen as an instructor at the Institute of Alaska Native art's prestigious Bending Tradition program which was "charged with creative energy" (p. 10) and his area of the wood working shop quickly became known as "Aleut Corner" (p. 10) as the plethora of bentwood hunting visors poured forth.

Okalena Patricia Lekanoff-Gregory, Unalaska Aleut artist, is one of Gronholdt's students, having instructed classes throughout the Aleutians and Northwest United States. At the beginning of each of her classes, Okalena Patricia Lekanoff-Gregory tells all of her new students about her instructor, Andrew Gronholdt, and has a portrait of Gronholdt displayed at the carving table, next to the carving knives. An important component of Aleut values is to acknowledge Unangax elders. In 2011 Lekanoff-Gregory worked with the Smithsonian's Arctic Studies Center to produce a video titled "The Artistry and History of the Aleutian Islands Bentwood Hat" on YouTube in which she provides an overview of how the bentwood hats are carved, steamed, and bent. Lekanoff-Gregory also honors having learned chagudax from Gronholdt.

== Death and legacy ==
Gronholdt died on 13 March 1998, in Edmonds, Washington, at the age of 82. Gronholdt was laid to rest at Evergreen Washelli Memorial Park next to his wife Elisabeth. Since his death, some of his former students have continued his teaching. His legacy of building chagudax continues into the future as instructors at Aleut culture camp use forms and jigs he built to teach new generations about the proud warriors who defended their coastal villages wearing these unique hunting visors. The Aleut Foundation offers the Andrew Gronholdt Scholarship Award to Aleut students majoring in the arts.

== Publications ==
In January 2012 Gronholdt's photographs, diary, and drawings were published in a book titled "Chagudax: A Small Window into the Life of an Aleut Bentwood Hat Carver". Most of the material in the book was created by Gronholdt and includes many photographs of the chagudax which he designed, carved, steamed and bent. The 96-page book, edited by Michael Livingston and Sharon Gronholdt-Dye, contains 144 illustrations. Gronholdt's diary details his younger years in the Shumagin Islands when times were sometimes hardscrabble such as near-starvation of the entire Gronholdt family on remote Dolgoi Island in the 1920s. Gronholdt's distinctly optimistic world view shines a bright light into life in the Shumagin Islands in the early 20th century.
