= Steam bending =

Woodworking technique

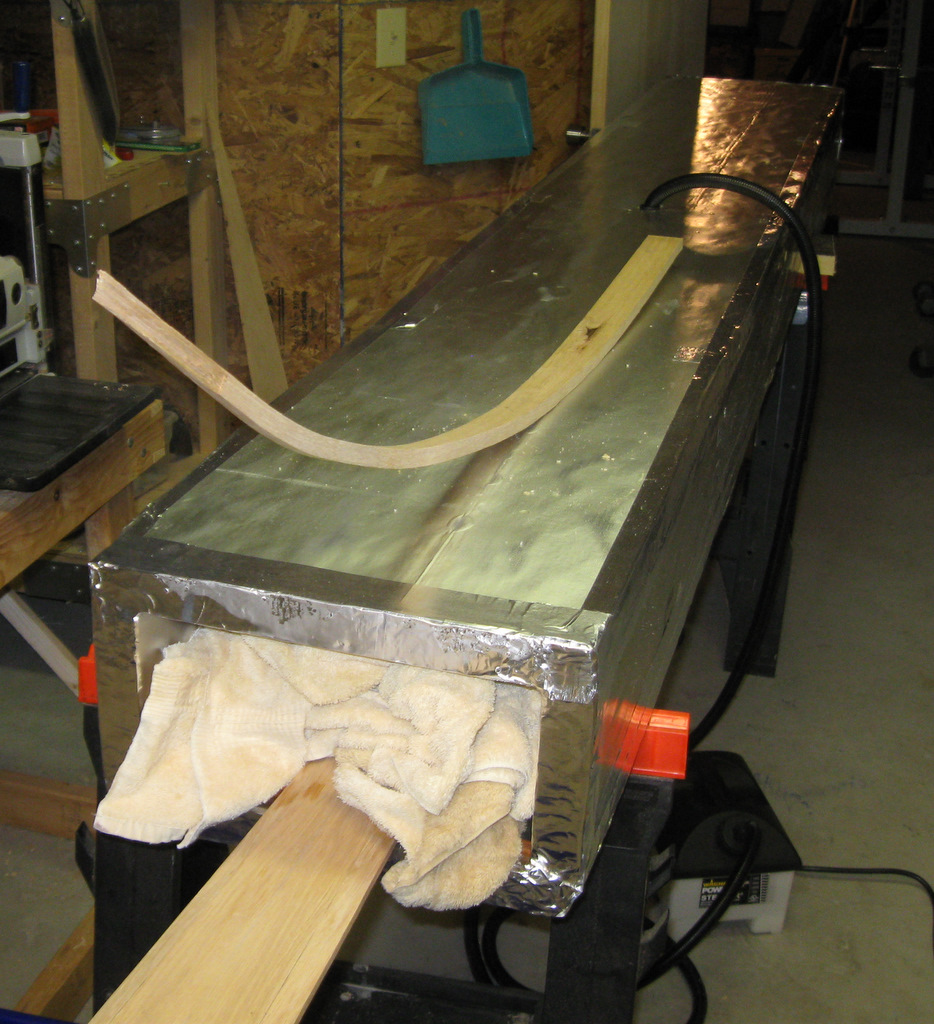
Steam bending in a steam box

Steam bending is a woodworking technique where wood is exposed to steam to make it pliable. Heat and moisture from steam can soften wood fibres enough so they can be bent and stretched, and when cooled down they will hold their new shape.

In modern times, steam bending is usually done with a steam box to make it bend around a form. The moulding process is typically done by clamping wooden strips to a positive form, with the strips of wood often reinforced on the outside with a metal band to prevent blowout. The method has been used in the manufacturing of a diverse range of products, including wooden boat building where it is used in the shaping of hull's ribs and lap boards, the production of traditional wooden lacrosse sticks, musical instruments such as the violin, the manufacture of wooden furniture such as the Windsor chair and much of Michael Thonet's and Alvar Aalto's work.

Steam bending is a traditional process steeped in history. It was once a vital practice, paramount to the production of weapons, tools and water vessels, but with the advance of technology the practice has become less common. Steam bending is also a low energy, ecological and economical method of manipulating wood. It doesn't need the expense or drying time of glues to join several wood pieces to make the desired shape. Steam bending also leaves lower levels of scrap since a smaller piece can be bent into shape instead of cutting the desired shape away from larger, more expensive stock.

== Process ==
Steam bending is limited in the degree of bend it can achieve, particularly for thick wood. Also, not all species of wood steam-bend well. It weakens the wood slightly and can leave residual stresses which may cause breakage, blowouts or spring-back over time.

To properly bend a sheet or plank of wood, there are a few techniques that will help. The hardness of the wood will determine how long is required to soak the wood in water. The harder the wood, the more time is needed to fully soak the wood before it can be bent and to prevent it from springing back to its original form. Popular hardwoods are oak, maple, cherry, birch, walnut, ash and poplar. Common softwoods are pine, fir, spruce, hemlock, cedar and redwood.

A steel mold that is placed on the back of the wood while heat bending can help ensure that all the bends and curves are done to the requirements of the project being made. After heat bending the wood in a steam box, clamping the wood into a solid mold or jig will reinforce the bends made to the wood while drying, preventing the wood from straightening while it dries, which is also known as spring back.

== Steam Box ==
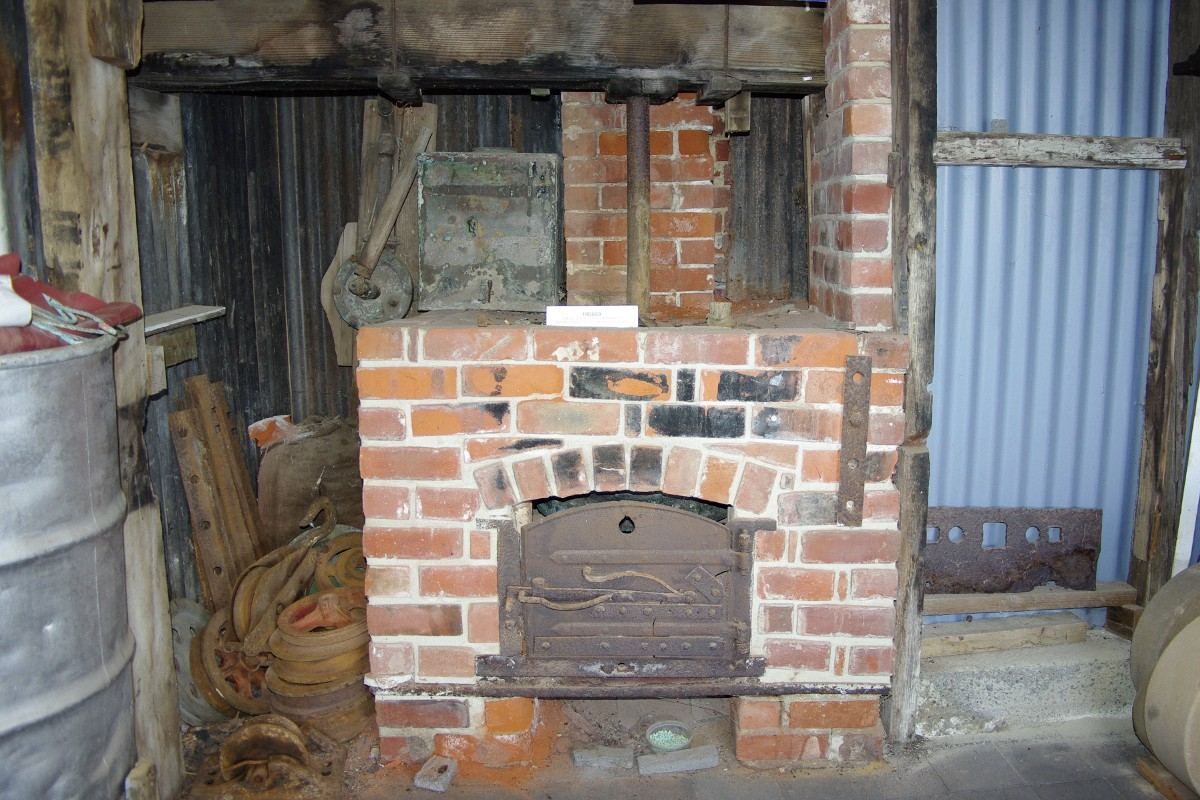
Steam box oven at historic Axel Stenross slipway, Port Lincoln, South Australia

A steam box is a long, sealed container used to steam wooden planks for the purpose of making them pliable. Once steamed and then fastened or clamped into the desired position and left to dry, the wood will hold the new shape. Steam boxes allow for much more efficient use of wood. Instead of cutting the desired shape away from a large and more expensive piece of wood and leaving much scrap to be discarded, steam boxes allow for a smaller piece to be bent in the general shape and leaving much less scrap. Steam boxes also allow the wood to bend beyond its dry breaking point, which is useful in making extreme curves with the wood. In many cases, the bent piece is stronger than an identical piece cut from larger stock. Steam bending wood allows the wood grain to follow the bend, leaving it strong where a piece cut from larger stock would snap across crosscut grains or laminated joints.

The largest steam boxes are used in boat building to bend the large planks for the frame and hull. However, smaller ones are used in making a variety of consumer items, such as rocking chairs, musical instruments and walking canes.

== Traditional chair making ==
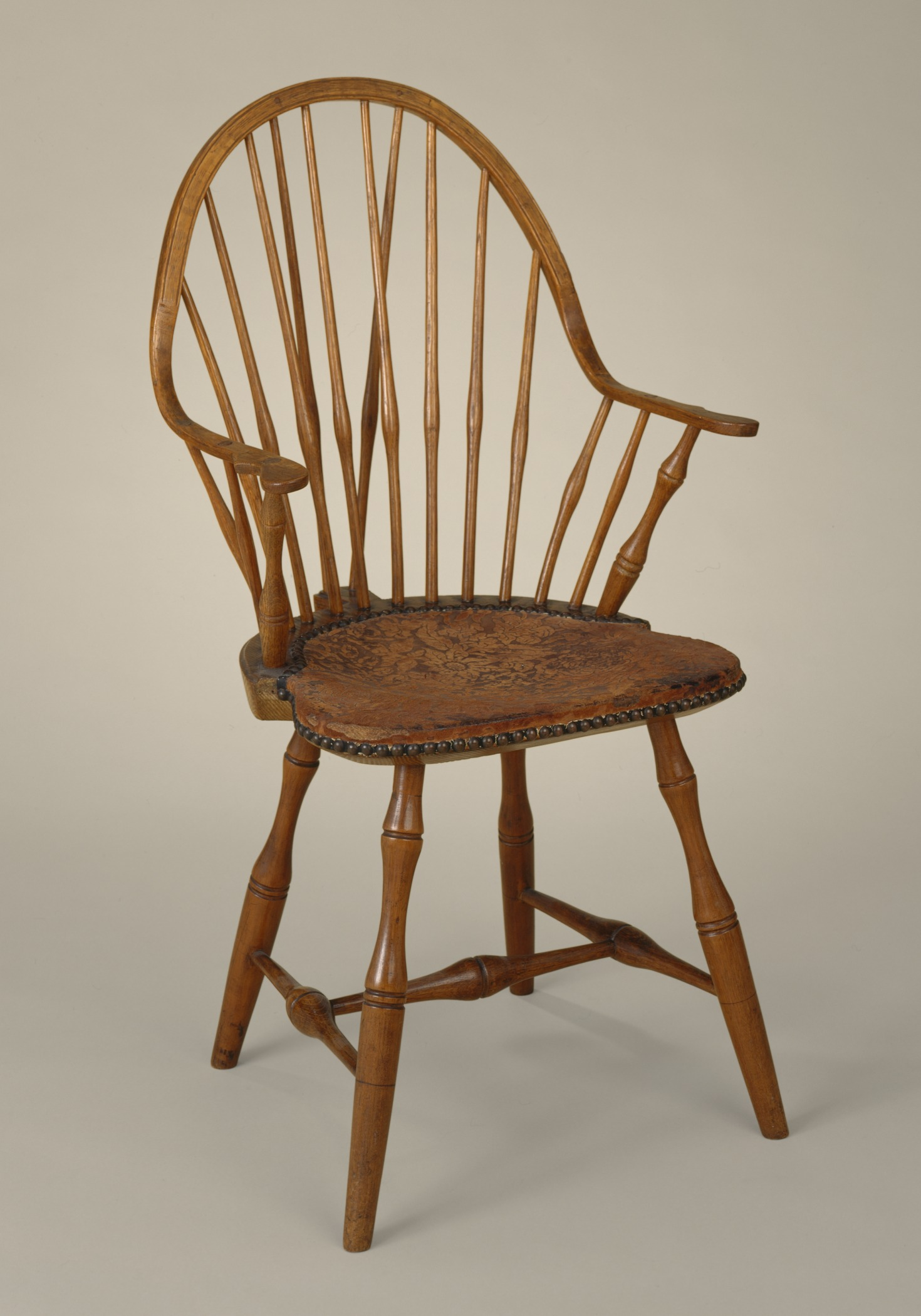
Windsor armchair

The traditional English country chair, that evolved into what became known worldwide as the Windsor chair, used steam bending, from the early 18th century at least, to produce its characteristic "bow".

== Bentwood ==
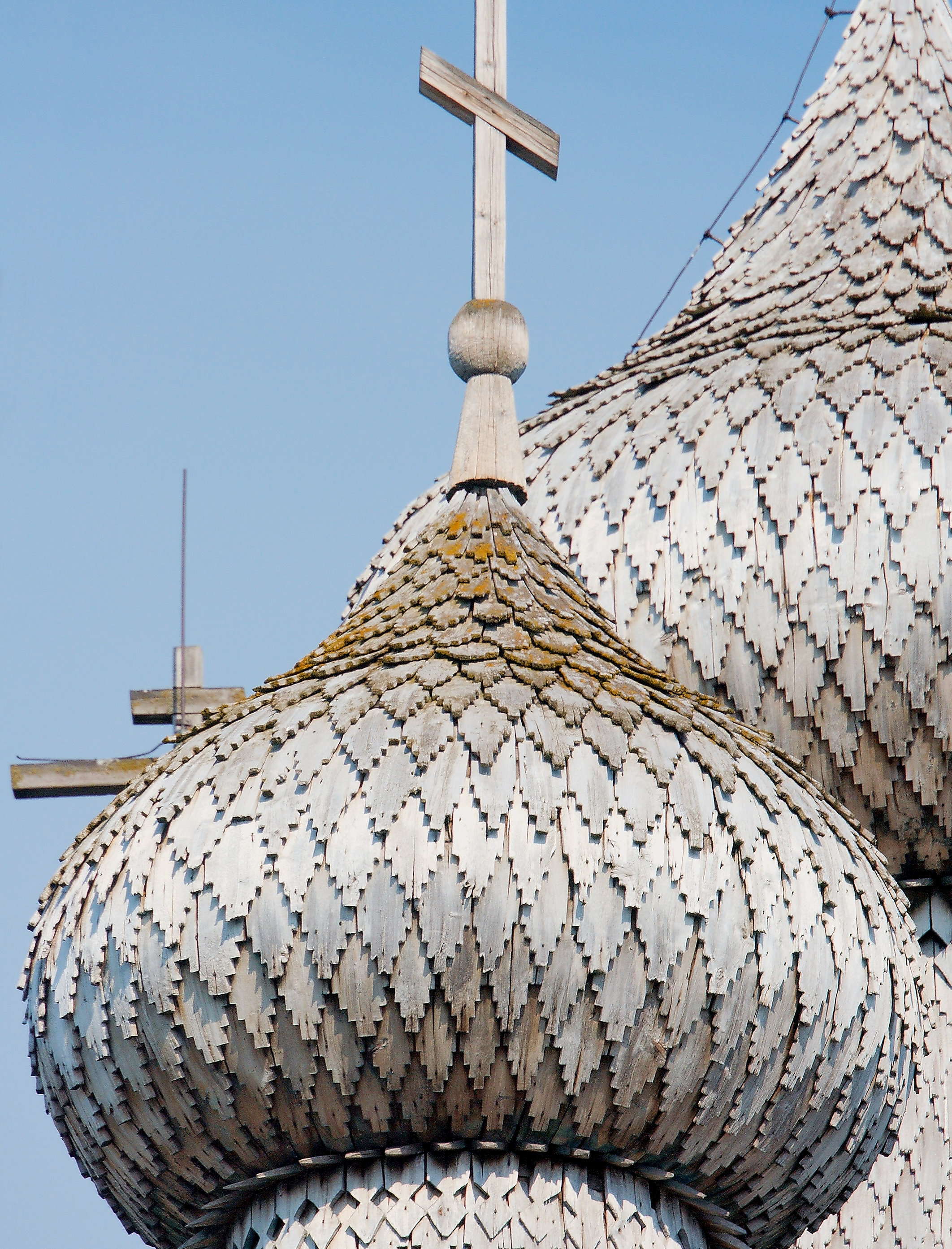
The wood roof shingles on this onion dome were bent to match the curves of the dome. The church is in a compound known as the Kizhi Pogost.

Bentwood objects are those made by wetting wood (either by soaking or by steaming), then bending it and letting it harden into curved shapes and patterns. In furniture making this method is often used in the production of rocking chairs, cafe chairs, and other light furniture. The iconic No. 14 chair by Thonet is a well-known design based on the technique. The process is in widespread use for making casual and informal furniture of all types, particularly seating and table forms. It is also a popular technique in the worldwide production of furniture with frames made of heavy cane, which is commonly imported into European and Western shops.

Bentwood boxes are a traditional item made by the First Nations people of the North American west coast including the Haida, Gitxsan, Tlingit, Tsimshian, Sugpiaq, Unangax, Yup'ik, Inupiaq and Coast Salish. These boxes are generally made out of one piece of wood that is steamed and bent to form a box. Traditional uses of the boxes was varied and included storage of food goods, clothing and for burial. They were often without decoration while others were decorated elaborately. Today many are made for collectors and can be purchased from museums, gift shops and online sites as well as directly commissioned from the artists.

The Aleut or Unangan People of Alaska made hunting visors, called chagudax, out of driftwood using the bentwood method. The visors were used by hunters who were in kayaks. They are said to help keep the sea spray off the face as well as improve hearing. They were often decorated with paints, beads, sea lion whiskers and ivory figurines. Andrew Gronholdt is credited with reviving the art of chagudax carving in the 1980s. Present-day Unangan artists create chagadux for ceremonial purposes and offer them for sale to the public as well.

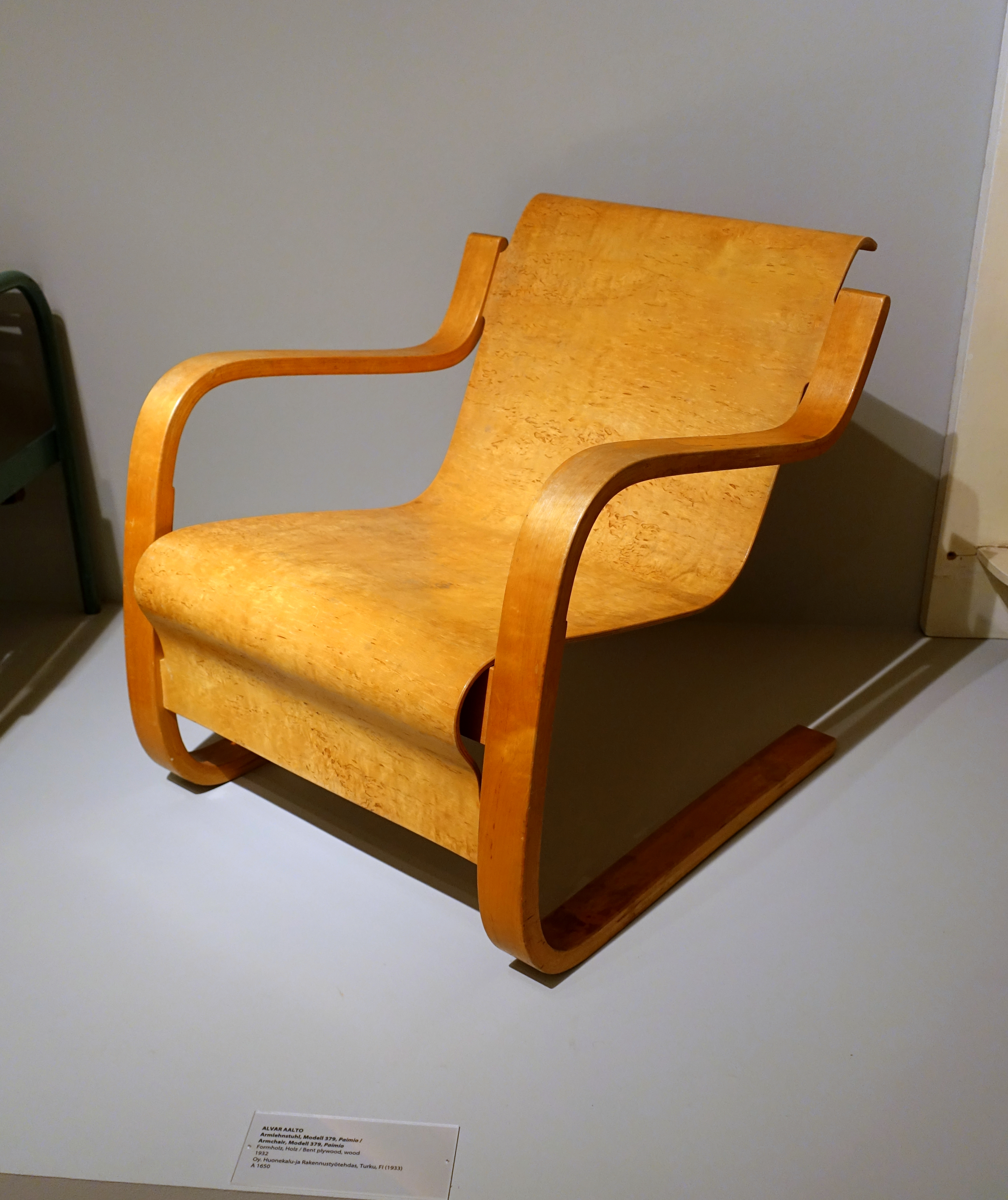
Alvar Aalto, "Paimio chair", 1932, designed especially for the Paimio Tuberculosis Sanatorium.

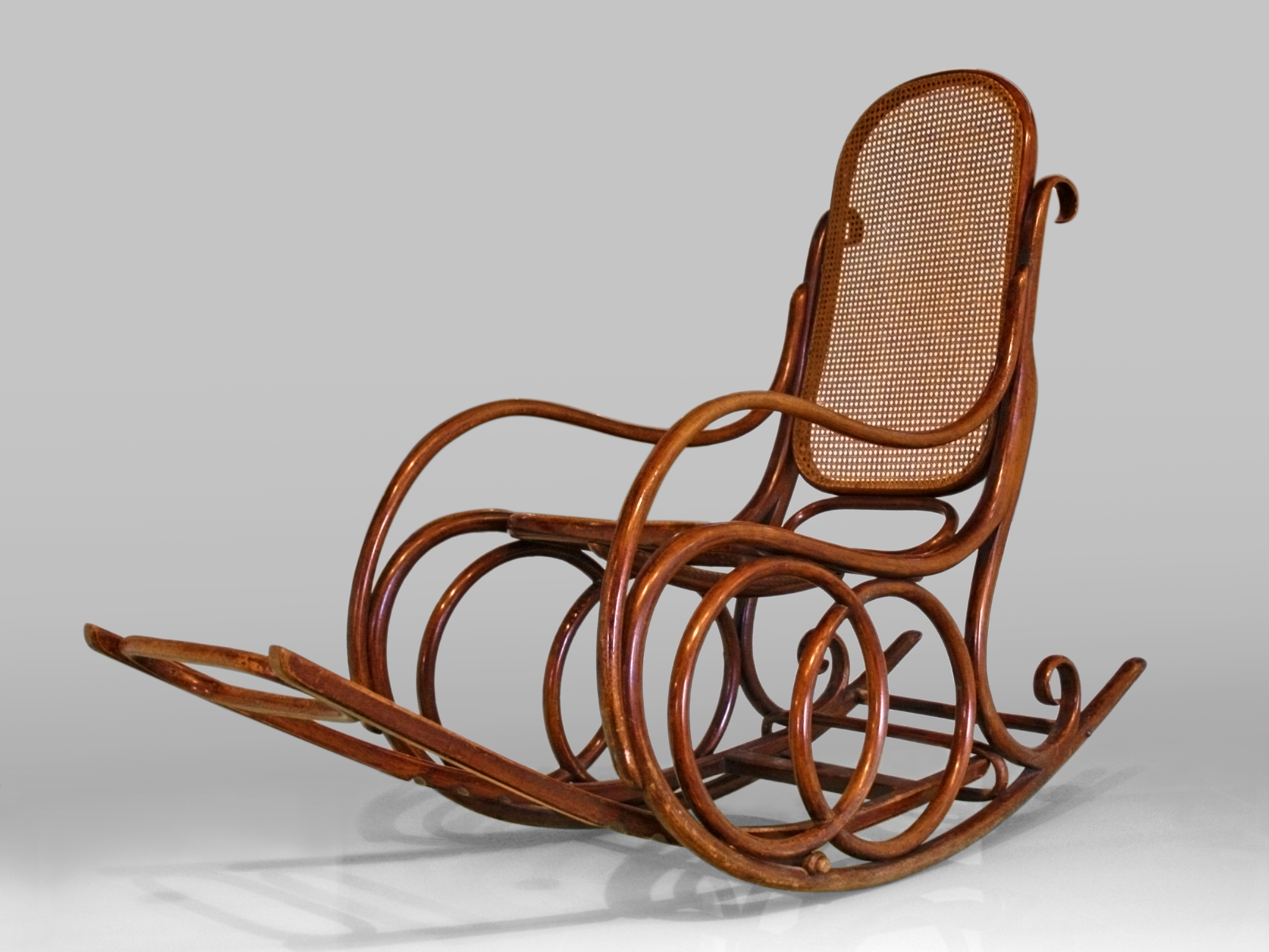
Bentwood rocking chair

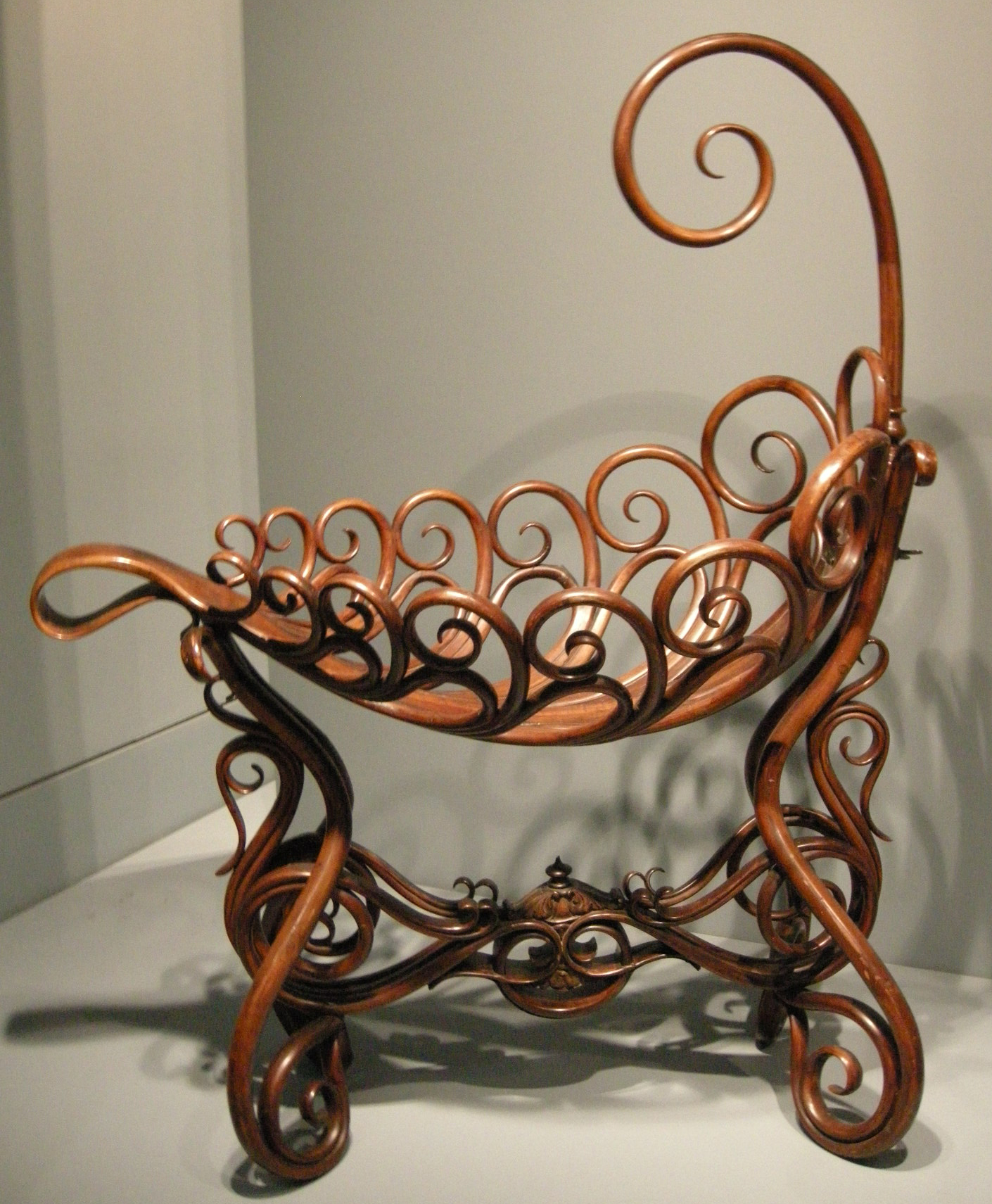
Bentwood cradle

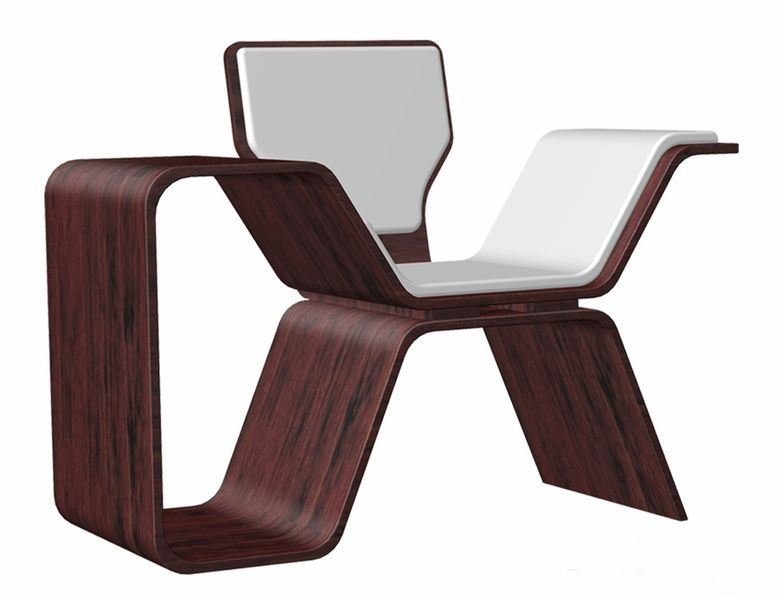
Bentwood chair

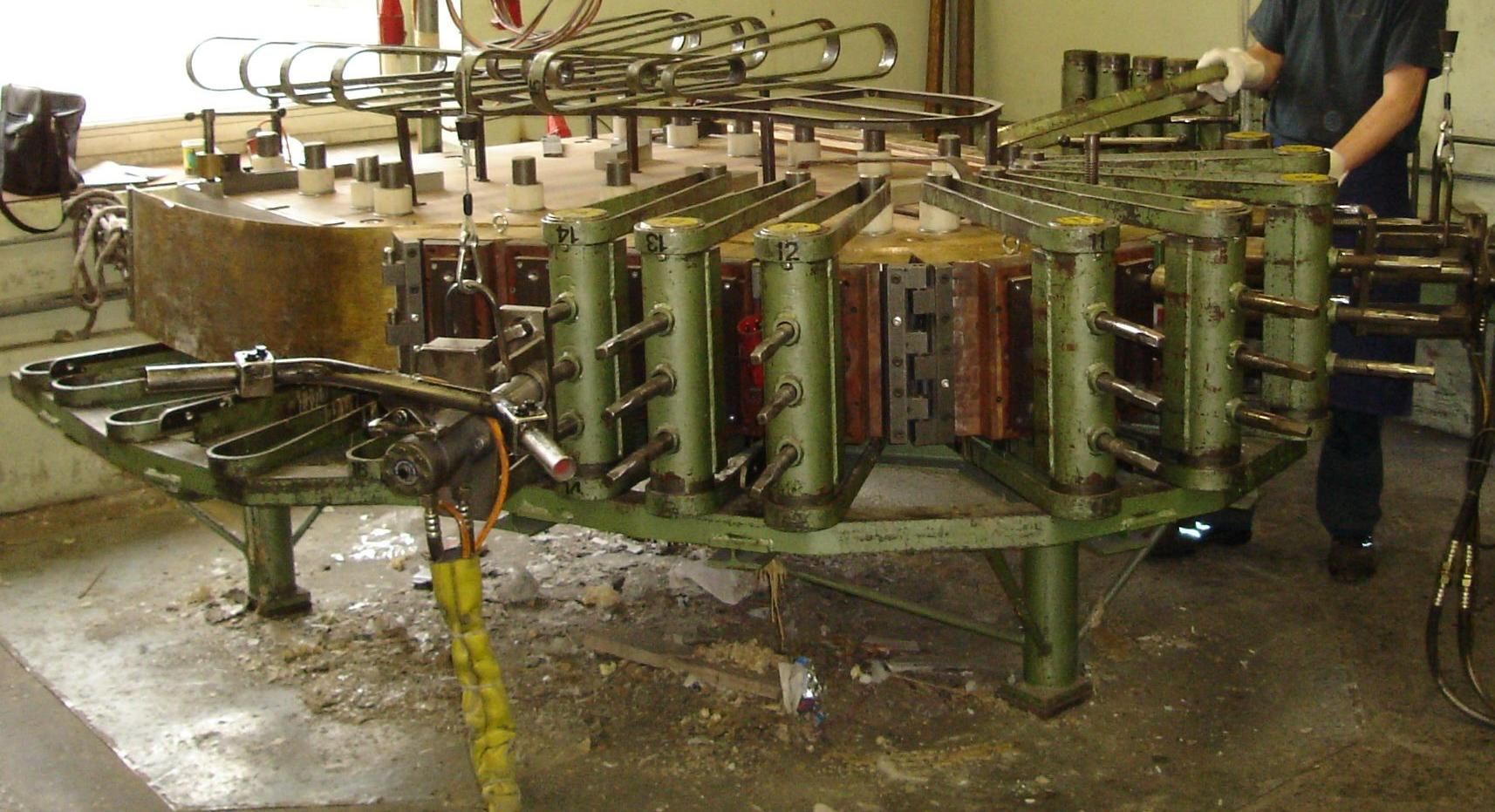
A Steinway solid wood piano case being pressed after taking from the steam box.

== See also ==
- Heat bending of wood
