= Worshipful Company of Furniture Makers =

Livery company of the City of London

The Worshipful Company of Furniture Makers
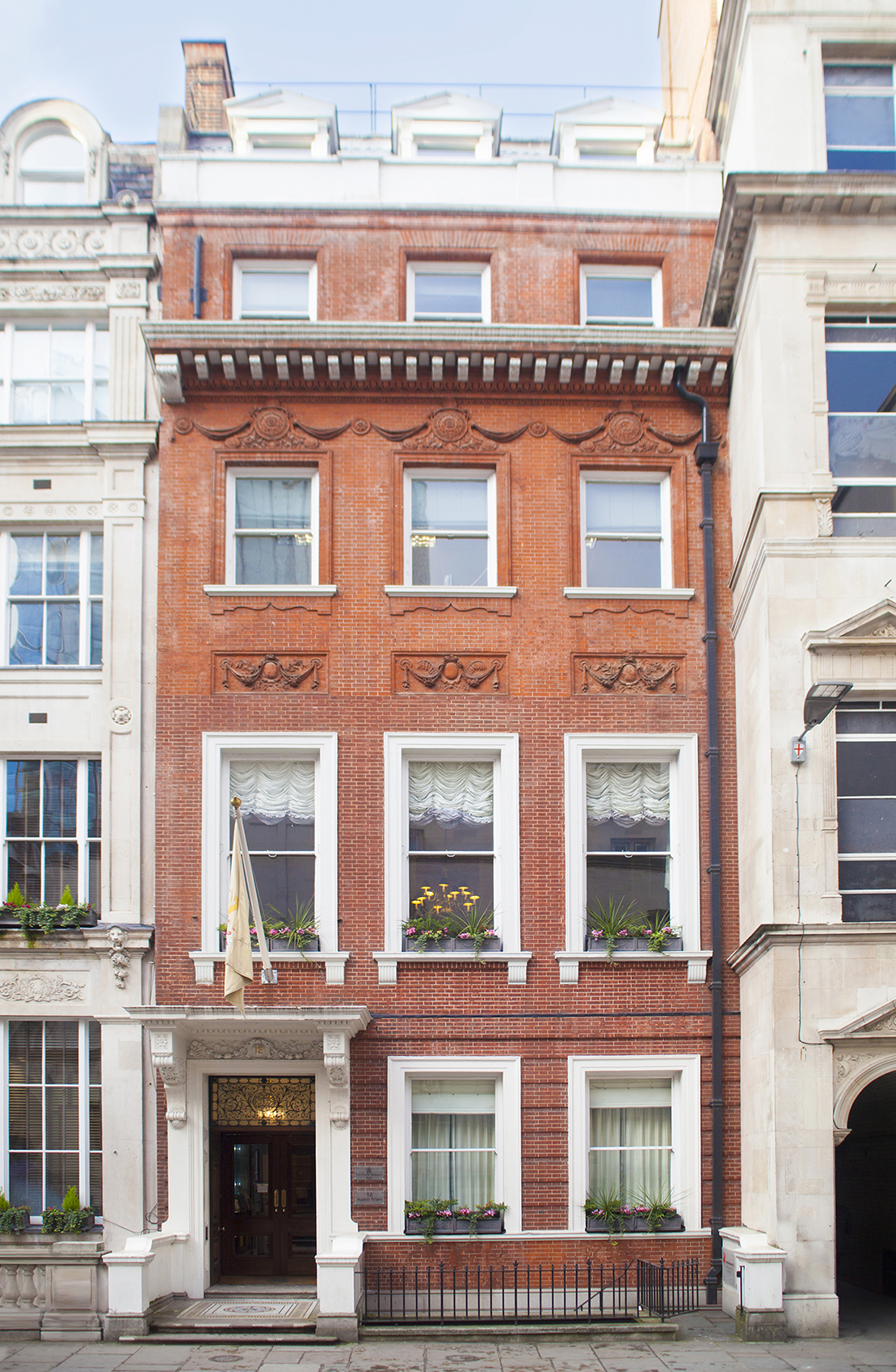
- Motto: Straight and Strong
- Location: Furniture Makers' Hall; 12 Austin Friars; City of London
- Date of formation: 1952
- Company association: UK Furnishing Industry
- Order of precedence: 83rd
- Master of company: Jessica Alexander (2026-2027)
- Website: The Furniture Makers Company

The Worshipful Company of Furniture Makers referred to as The Furniture Makers' Company, is one of the Livery Companies of the City of London. The organisation was formed in 1952, and was granted Livery status by the City in 1963 being the 83rd in order of precedence. Its church is St Mary-le-Bow

The Furniture Makers' Company is the British furnishing industry's central organisation, charity and patron.

== History ==
The Furniture Makers' Company was formed originally as a guild in 1952 before being established as the 83rd livery company of the City of London in 1963. Their charity however was established over 100 years ago as the Furnishing Trades Benevolent Association (FTBA), later known as the Furnishing Industry Trust (FIT), dedicated to helping people in the furnishing industry in times of hardship. The Furniture Makers' Company merged with FIT in 2013.

In 2007 the company acquired the freehold of 12 Austin Friars - Furniture Makers' Hall. Austin Friar has subsequently become the name of their main publication. The Furniture Makers' Hall was built in 1882 and still has many of the original Victorian features from when it was built, as well as bespoke wood furniture and fittings, including an ornate oak staircase running through the centre of the building. The Hall was purchased outright in 2007 and has been refurbished to create a venue for membership events.

== The role of the company ==
Members of the company, liverymen and freemen, come from many disciplines and professions, but all have a common link by being currently or previously engaged in or with the furniture and furnishings industry. This gives the Company "closed" status and ensures its activities are relevant to, and supportive of, the industry.

The company is active in three main areas - education, excellence and welfare.

In education the company works with schools, colleges, universities and commercial training providers to offer a range of training to potential and current industry participants.

The company's various award schemes recognize excellence in design, innovation, and sustainable production in the industry.

The company's welfare initiatives support current and past employees in the furniture and furnishings industry, offering both financial aid and pastoral care.

Additionally the company works closely with the wider Livery movement in support of the Lord Mayor and the City of London and provides a range of charitable and social events to its members.
