= Inga Sempé =

French designer

- Born: 1968 (age 57–58)
- Education: ENSCI; French Academy in Rome
- Occupation: designer
- Spouse: Ronan Bouroullec
- Father: Jean-Jacques Sempé
- Awards: Red Dot Design Award 2007

Inga Sempé (born 1968) is a French designer known for creating technical items, including furniture, lamps, and other design objects. She has collaborated with manufacturers such as Ligne Roset, Alessi, and Baccarat. In 2007, she received the Red Dot Design Award.

== Early life ==
Inga Sempé was born in 1968 to Mette Ivers, a Danish graphic artist and painter, and Jean-Jacques Sempé, a French graphic artist. She studied at Ecole Nationale Superieure de Création Industrielle (ENSCI) in Paris, graduating in 1993. She married designer Ronan Bouroullec and has two children. Inga Sempé lives and works in Paris.

== Career ==
In 1994, Sempé collaborated with Australian designer Marc Newson, and from 1997 to 1999, she worked with French designer Andrée Putman. Beginning in 2000, she collaborated with Italian design companies Cappellini and Edra while establishing her own company in Paris. Sempé focuses on creating sustainable and simple, yet not minimalist, objects.

For Sempé, functionality is paramount, and the choice of material must support it. She is known for creating versatile designs, such as lamps that can be extended like accordions and a suitcase prototype for VIA that can replace a hotel wardrobe by adjusting its size. She collaborates with Italian, French, and Scandinavian design companies, designing furniture, decor, and various objects for brands including Alessi, Ligne Roset, Baccarat, Tectona, HAY, LucePlan, Moustache, and the American manufacturer Artecnica.

== Works ==
Many of her lamps feature fan-like lampshades that create diverse light and shadow effects. The Plissé pendant lamp, produced by Luceplan, is designed with pleated material that can be unfolded like an accordion. In 2009, the lamp manufacturer Moustache introduced the Vapeur series of pendant and table lamps, distinguished by their unique lampshades made from densely folded Tyvek fleece. This thin, paper-like material is available in either white or printed with delicate, fine lines in soft colors.

The Swedish lamp manufacturer Wästberg offers her clip lamp, which can be used as a table lamp or hung on the wall.

== Exhibitions ==
- In 2003, the Musée des Arts Décoratifs in Paris dedicated an exhibition to Inga Sempé.
- In 2024, the Triennale Milano hosted an exhibition titled Inga Sempé, La Casa Imperfetta ("The Imperfect House"), curated by Marco Sammicheli.

== Recognition ==
- Fellowship at the Villa Medici (2000–2001)
- 8000-Euro Major Design Award of the City of Paris (2003)
- Red Dot Design Award (2007) for her upholstered furniture Moël.
- Guest of honor at the Stockholm Furniture & Northern Light Fair (2012).
