= Ana Kraš =

Serbian designer

- Ана Краш
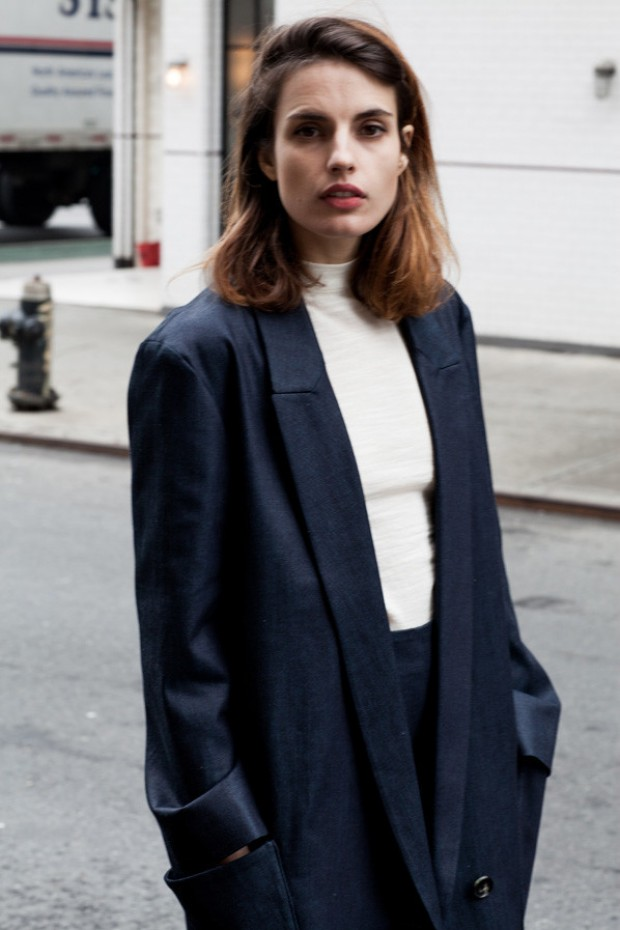
- Born: July 25, 1984 (age 41); Belgrade, SR Serbia, SFR Yugoslavia
- Occupations: Designer and photographer
- Known for: Bonbon lamps
- Notable work: Ana Kraš: Ikebana Albums (Prestel Publishing, 2016)
- Website: anakras.com

Ana Kraš (Serbian Cyrillic: Ана Краш; born July 25, 1984) is a Serbian furniture designer, photographer and fashion designer who is based in Paris, France. She has gained recognition for her Bonbon Lamps and for her photography for the Copenhagen Fashion Week sets, as well as for swimwear.

== Background ==
Born in Belgrade, SR Serbia, Kraš studied furniture design at the University of Arts in Belgrade. In her final year of studies, she won the Young Balkan Designers contest, allowing her to exhibit a plywood chair Hug at the Salone del Mobile in Milan, Italy. The designer Konstantin Grcic, who headed the jury, gave her some valuable advice, encouraging her to be more free in her work. As a teenager, she briefly modeled in Japan after declining modeling contracts in New York and Paris. She moved to Los Angeles in 2011 before settling in Manhattan in 2013.

== Career ==
=== Design ===
Kraš has exhibited at NYC Design week, Maison et Objet in Paris, and at design weeks in Vienna, Belgrade, and Budapest. Naomi Smart of Vogue appreciates her "slick personal style" and her "organic-modernist mash-up aesthetic". Kraš first gained attention for her handmade lamps, especially her Bonbon Lamps, made with recycled threads from the fashion industry. In 2019, Kraš collaborated with the Danish company HAY to produce a version of the Bonbon Lamps to be sold in their stores.

Kraš has a varied portfolio touching many aspects of design as well as photography. She has designed tables, lamps, wallpaper, and swimwear. In 2017, Kraš oversaw visuals for the fashion designer Maryam Nassir Zadeh and also designed the set at Copenhagen Fashion Week for fashion designer Ganni. Other fashion houses she's collaborated with include Martin Margiela and Etudes Studio. Vogue and W Magazine have named Kraš the "it girl" of good taste. Ambra Medda, co-founder and former director of Design Miami, has listed Kraš as one of her favorite young designers.

=== Photography and fine art ===
Regarding her photography, Kraš has done work for Ganni, as well as for Lou & Grey (see Ann Inc.). This includes the Lou & Grey look book and their online magazine Ampersand. In 2016, Kraš released her photography book Ana Kraš: Ikebana Albums, which focuses on both portraits and landscapes. In 2017, Kraš collaborated with Natalie Weinberger for a showing at the Picture Room gallery in Brooklyn, New York. The exhibition, entitled "Family", consisted of ceramic sculptures and drawings which explored the "emotional interplay between inanimate objects". She appeared on the cover of the debut, April 2025 issue of Vogue Living Adria, alongside her partner Ruben Moreira.
