= Oudolf Garten =

Garden on the Vitra Complex

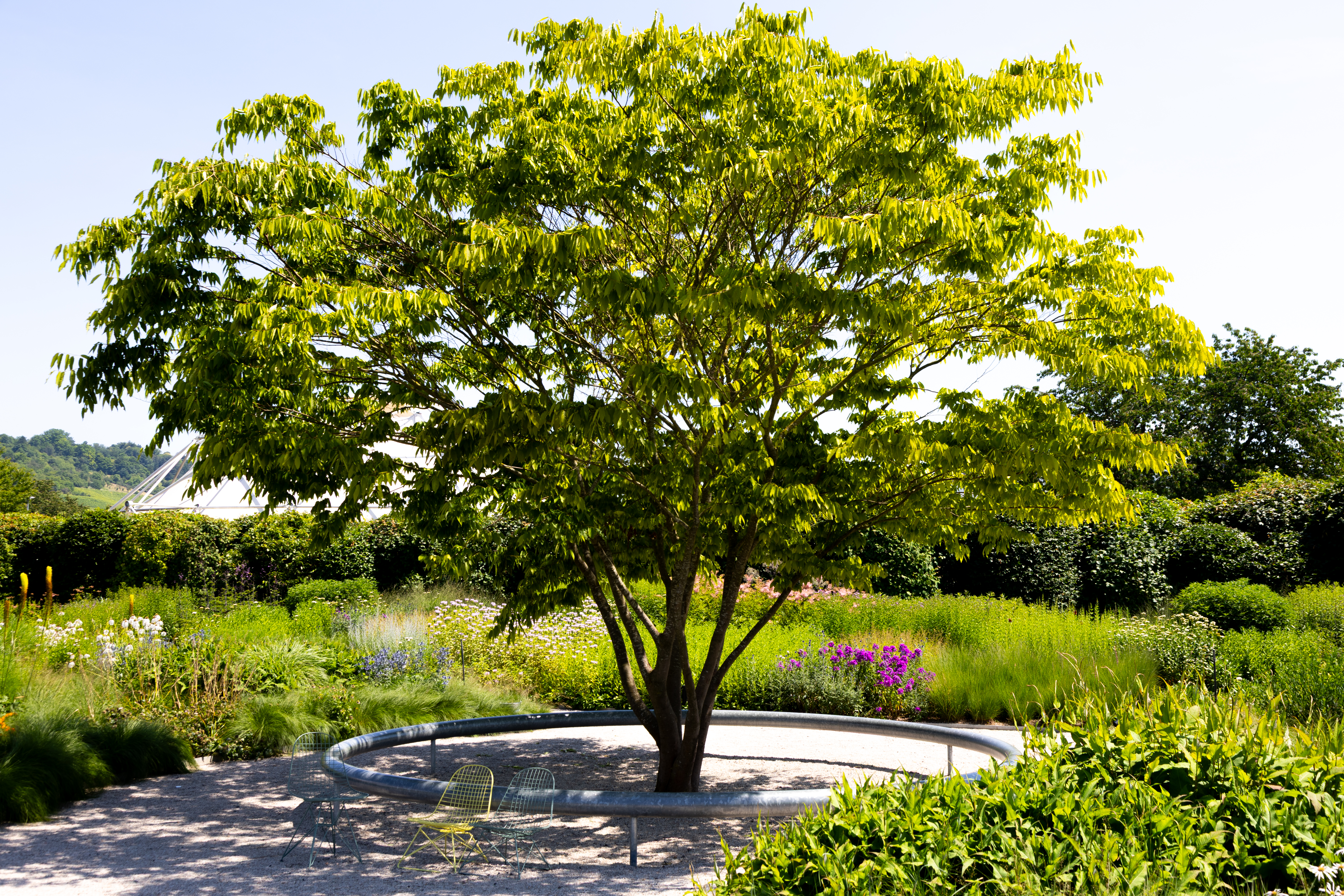
- The garden, surrounding Ronan and Erwan Bouroullec's Ring
- Type: Garden
- Location: Vitra Campus, Ray, Charles-Eames-Straße 1; 79576 Weil am Rhein, Germany
- Coordinates: 47.60288079728352°N 7.6172328988048825°E
- Area: 4,000 square meters
- Created: 2020
- Designer: Piet Oudolf
- Owned by: Vitra

Oudolf Garten, or Garten von Piet Oudolf, is a garden on the Vitra Campus in Weil am Rhein, Germany. Placed in front of the VitraHaus, it was planted by the Dutch landscape architect Piet Oudolf in May 2020 and opened to the public in June 2021.

== History ==
Rofl Fehlbaum, the chairman emeritus of Vitra, did not foresee any new buildings created on the Vitra Campus following the completion of the VitraHaus. However, he entertained the idea of a garden, as there had been landscaping projects done on the Vitra Campus before. Upon seeing Oudolf's art at the Venice Biennale in 2010, as well as the High Line, Fehlbaum immediately considered him for the task.

Originally, Fehlbaum wanted the garden planted around the Vitra Design Museum, but Oudolf pushed for its placement in front of the VitraHaus with the specific argument that it would provide good scenery for those coming in and out of the building.

In May 2020, during the COVID-19 pandemic, Oudolf then began planting for a new garden on the Vitra Complex. The goal was to create a "balanced composition, or community as he calls it, of plants with distinct strengths and weaknesses and different flowering periods and life cycles, so that his gardens provide a sensual experience all year round and accentuate decay as much as high-season phases." Oudolf also wanted to provide a diversity of sensory experiences in different regions of the garden.

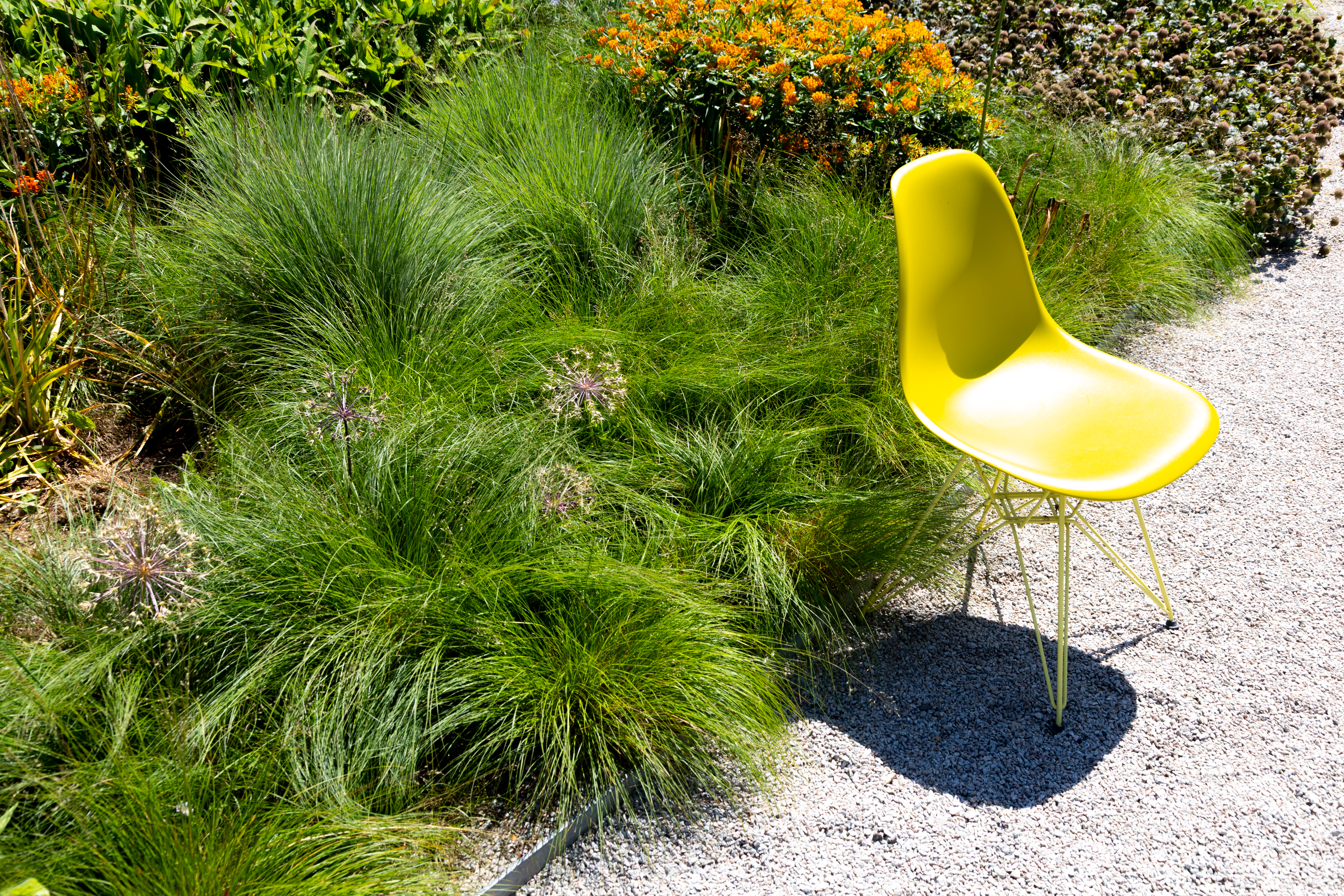
The garden, within which Vitra chairs are strewn around.

Months later, the flowers bloomed. Around thirty thousand plants had been used for the garden of around four thousand square meters in total, and existing sculptures by Ronan and Erwan Bouroullec were incorporated. It opened to the public in June 2021, with expected maturing by September.

In 2023, the Vitra Design Museum featured an exhibition on gardening, which included pieces by Oudolf. Mateo Kries, director of the Vitra Design Museum, identified Oudolf's garden as the initial motivation to curate an exhibition in the first place.
