= HAY (company) =

Danish furniture company

- Company type: Subsidiary
- Founded: 2002; 24 years ago in Copenhagen, Denmark
- Founders: Mette and Rolf Hay
- Headquarters: Copenhagen, Denmark
- Number of locations: 25 in 9 countries (2022)
- Products: Furniture, accessories
- Number of employees: 400 (2016)
- Parent: MillerKnoll
- Website: hay.dk millerknoll.com

HAY is a Danish furniture company founded in Copenhagen, Denmark, in 2002 by Mette and Rolf Hay. Its goal was to create and sell well-designed furniture that was accessible in terms of price as well as "design concepts". As of 2019, the brand is majority-owned by U.S. furniture company Herman Miller.

The cofounders serve as HAY's creative directors, with Rolf in charge of the furniture division and Mette in charge of accessories. They are closely involved in the development of HAY products, which is collaboratively done among in-house designers and product developers as well as a roster of international designers such as Ronan & Erwan Bouroullec, Nathalie Du Pasquier, Stefan Diez, Johannes Torpe, and Naoto Fukasawa.

== History ==
=== Early years ===
HAY was founded in 2002 by the husband-and-wife duo, Mette and Rolf Hay, who had themselves met when they worked at Gubi, another Danish furniture company. The idea for a furniture company came about when Rolf Hay met Troels Holch Povlsen, who had founded the Danish clothing giant Bestseller, among other companies, and the two decided to start making furniture together.

The company introduced its first collection in January 2003, at imm Cologne, an annual furniture fair in Cologne, Germany. In 2004, HAY opened its first store on Pilestræde, in the center of Copenhagen. In 2007, HAY opened its flagship store (to this day), HAY House, also in central Copenhagen.

=== Global expansion and growth ===
In 2014, HAY debuted a pop-up store for accessories and some furniture, HAY Mini Market, at the Milan Furniture Fair in 2014. Mette spearheaded the HAY Mini Market, a "small-object bazaar that sells attractive versions of mundane items like dishcloths, nail clippers, and tape". Mini Markets soon popped up around the world, including at department stores Selfridges in London and Le Bon Marché in Paris, as well as the Tsutaya bookstore in Tokyo. In 2015, HAY arrived in the United States via the MoMA design store in New York City.

As of 2015, HAY was operating in more than 50 countries with an annual turnover of US$140 million according to the Wall Street Journal.

=== Acquisition by Herman Miller ===
By 2018, HAY's catalogue included 180 items of furniture and 350 accessories, with $155 million in projected revenue for the year. In June 2018, the U.S. furniture company Herman Miller acquired a 33% equity stake in HAY for $66 million, as well as the rights to the HAY brand in North America for approximately $5 million.

Herman Miller and HAY worked together to localize production as well as open three stores in the United States—first in Portland, Oregon, as well as Costa Mesa, California, and Chicago. Revenue for its fiscal year ending July 2019 totaled $160 million. In the context of this strong performance and growth potential, in October 2019, Herman Miller purchased an additional 34% in equity for about $78 million, making it the majority owner. Herman Miller's CEO Andi Owen observed that its partnership with HAY had helped it reach "a younger, more urban demographic".

== Collaborations ==
The Creative Directors Mette and Rolf Hay (in charge of accessories and furniture, respectively) are involved in product design and development. Not only do they collaborate closely with the company's in-house designers and product-development teams, it has also been praised for working with contemporary designers from all around the world; some of them were already established (e.g., Ronan & Erwan Bouroullec), whereas others rose to prominence in part due to their collaboration with HAY (e.g., Scholten & Baijings). HAY's commitment to accessibility had led it to work with "designers who have an understanding of industrial production as to how things can actually be made".

Some designers that HAY has collaborated with include:

- Ronan & Erwan Bouroullec (France)
- Louise Campbell (Denmark)
- Stefan Diez (Germany)
- Nathalie Du Pasquier (France, Italy)
- Naoto Fukasawa (Japan)
- Ana Kraš (Serbia, US)
- Lex Pott (The Netherlands)
- Inga Sempé (France)
- Shane Schneck (US, Sweden)
- George Sowden (UK)
- Sebastian Wrong (UK)
- Muller Van Severen (Belgium)
- Clara von Zweigbergk (Sweden)
- Laila Gohar (US)
- Johannes Torpe (Denmark)

In addition to product or industrial designers, HAY also collaborates other companies as well as with individuals in adjacent careers, such as the Danish chef Frederik Bille Brahe, with whom they released pots, pans, sponges, cups, and other kitchenware in 2017.

Some of the corporate brands HAY has worked with include Sonos (HAY launched colorful limited-edition Sonos One speakers, which are usually just black and white), and Japanese shoe brand Suicoke. It also worked with IKEA to release the YPPERLIG Collection in 2017 with over 60 products including sofas, tables, mirrors, trays, and tote bags.

== Select works ==
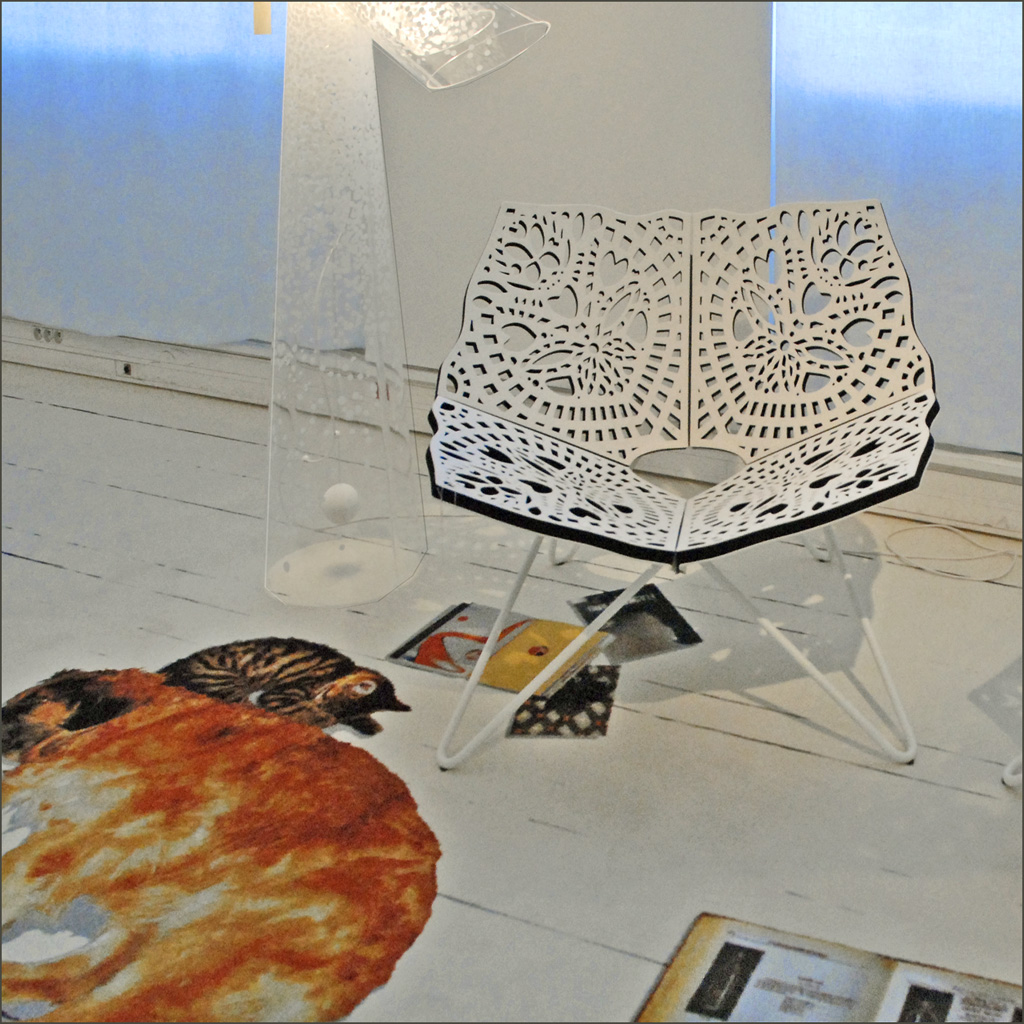
Prince chair by Louise Campbell

- The Prince Chair, a 2002 design by Louise Campbell that came about while designing for a competition to create a chair for Frederik, Crown Prince of Denmark. Although Campbell did not win the competition, HAY picked it up for manufacture, it won several awards, and belongs to the Museum of Modern Art's permanent collection.
- The Palissade collection, an outdoor steel furniture series sold by the MoMA design store, by Ronan & Erwan Bouroullec
- Stefan Diez's 2013 Rope Trick Foor Lamp for HAY also belongs in the MoMA permanent collection
- Élémentaire chair by Ronan & Erwan Bouroullec, which was showcased at the 2018 Milan Design Week in a collaborative exhibition by HAY, Sonos, and WeWork
- Hee Welling's "About A" series, which is viewed as one of the company's "most widely popular" and "most versatile"

== See also ==
- Danish design
- Danish modern
- List of Danish furniture designers
