= SoftBrew =

Coffee brewing device

Sowden SoftBrew (or SoftBrew) is a coffee brewing device by the designer George Sowden in 2010.

The device uses an infusion method for brewing coffee with a stainless steel filter and a ceramic pot.

== Method ==
The SoftBrew brews coffee by infusion (through steeping) in a perforated cylindrical stainless steel filter cup, which can be washed and reused.

Devices similar to the SoftBrew include manual drip coffee makers, French press coffee makers, the Empot, and, to a limited extent, other pour-over and drip coffee filters.
