= George Sowden =

British architect and designer (born 1942)

George J. Sowden
- Born: 1942 (age 83–84); Leeds, UK
- Education: Gloucestershire College
- Occupation: Product designer
- Spouse: Nathalie Du Pasquier
- Website: georgesowden.com

George James Sowden (born 1942) is a British designer and product developer based in Milan, where he moved in the early 1970s "and never left." He has "designed hundreds of objects, from [...] computers and peripherals to housewares, appliances, furniture and [...] writing instruments".

== Life and career ==
George Sowden was born in Leeds, England, in 1942. He studied architecture at Gloucestershire College of Art in the 1960s. In 1971, he moved to Milan, where he started working with Ettore Sottsass and Olivetti.

In parallel to the industrial design work on early Olivetti computers, he was involved during the 1970s in experimental "radical" design projects which enabled him to become, in 1981, one of the co-founders of the Memphis Group, the design movement that had a significant impact on design in the eighties.

In the same year, 1981, he founded his design studio, SowdenDesign, collaborating with companies such as Olivetti, Alessi, Bodum, Guzzini, Lorenz, Rancilio, Steelcase, Swatch, Segis, Memphis, IPM, Moulinex, Telecom Italia, Tefal and Pyrex.

In 1991, he received the Compasso d'Oro Award for design excellence for Olivetti, Fax OFX420.

His works are held by museums such as the Metropolitan Museum, Brooklyn Museum, and Cooper Hewitt in New York, Museum Boijmans Van Beuningen in Rotterdam, and the Victoria and Albert Museum in London.

== Notable works ==
In 2010, Sowden developed the SoftBrew coffee brewing device, which is distributed and sold throughout the world, notably in collaboration with the Danish design company HAY.

In 2012, Sowden established his own brand, SOWDEN, dedicated to the development, manufacture and distribution of exclusive products designed under his own name. Throughout his career, he has maintained a personal interest in collaborating with craft and small industrial organisations, an approach that has informed much of his design work.

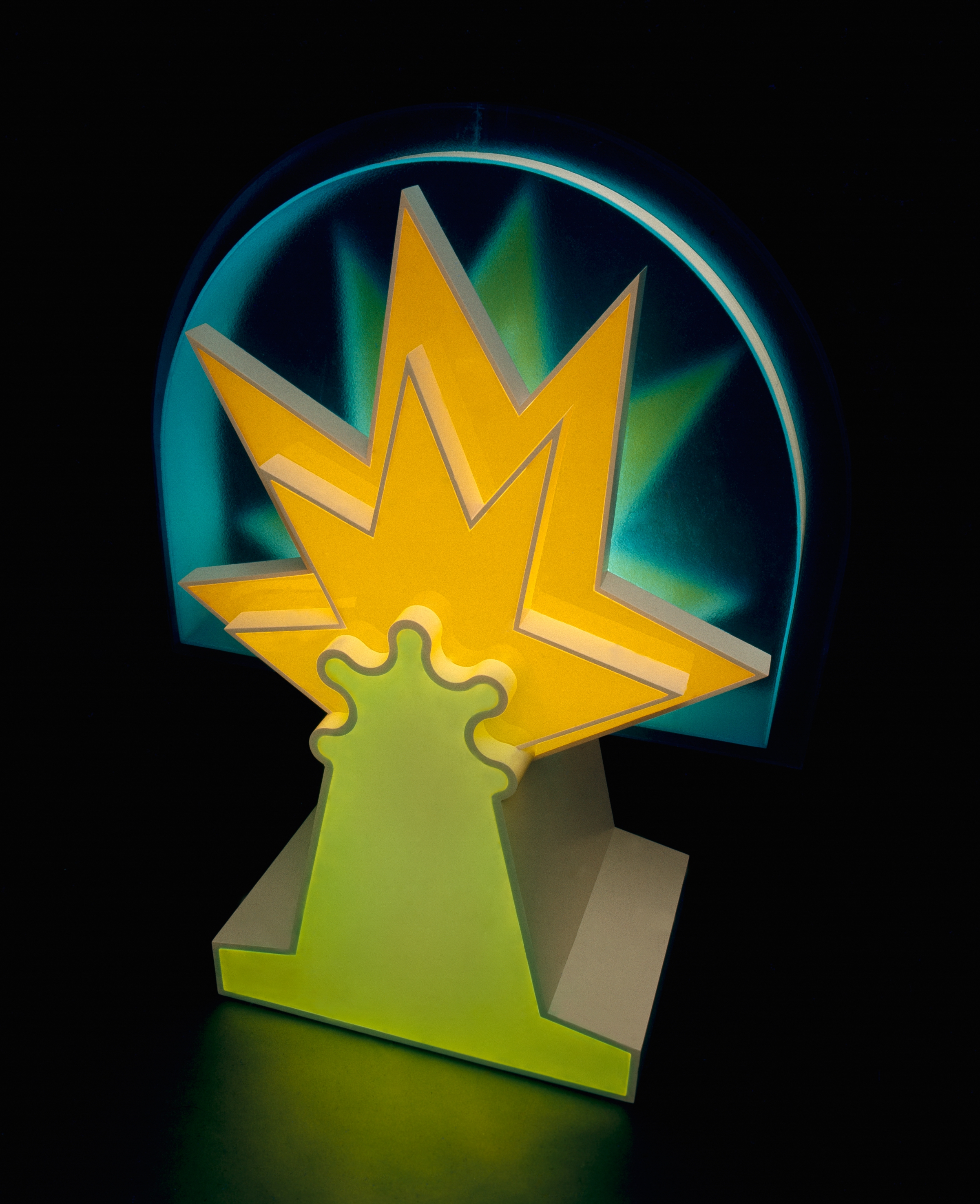
Star Lamp, 1973

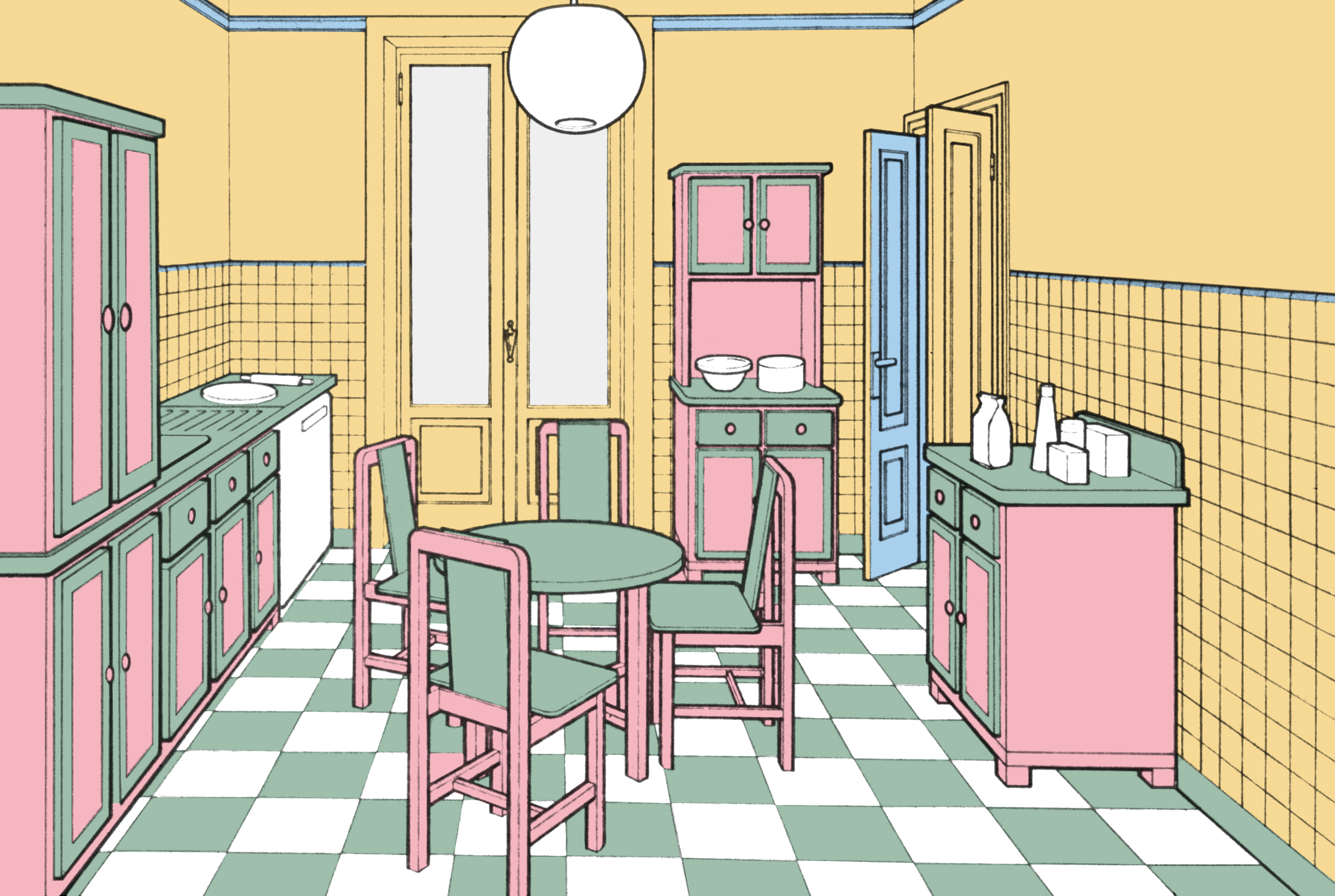
Familiar Landscapes, 1973

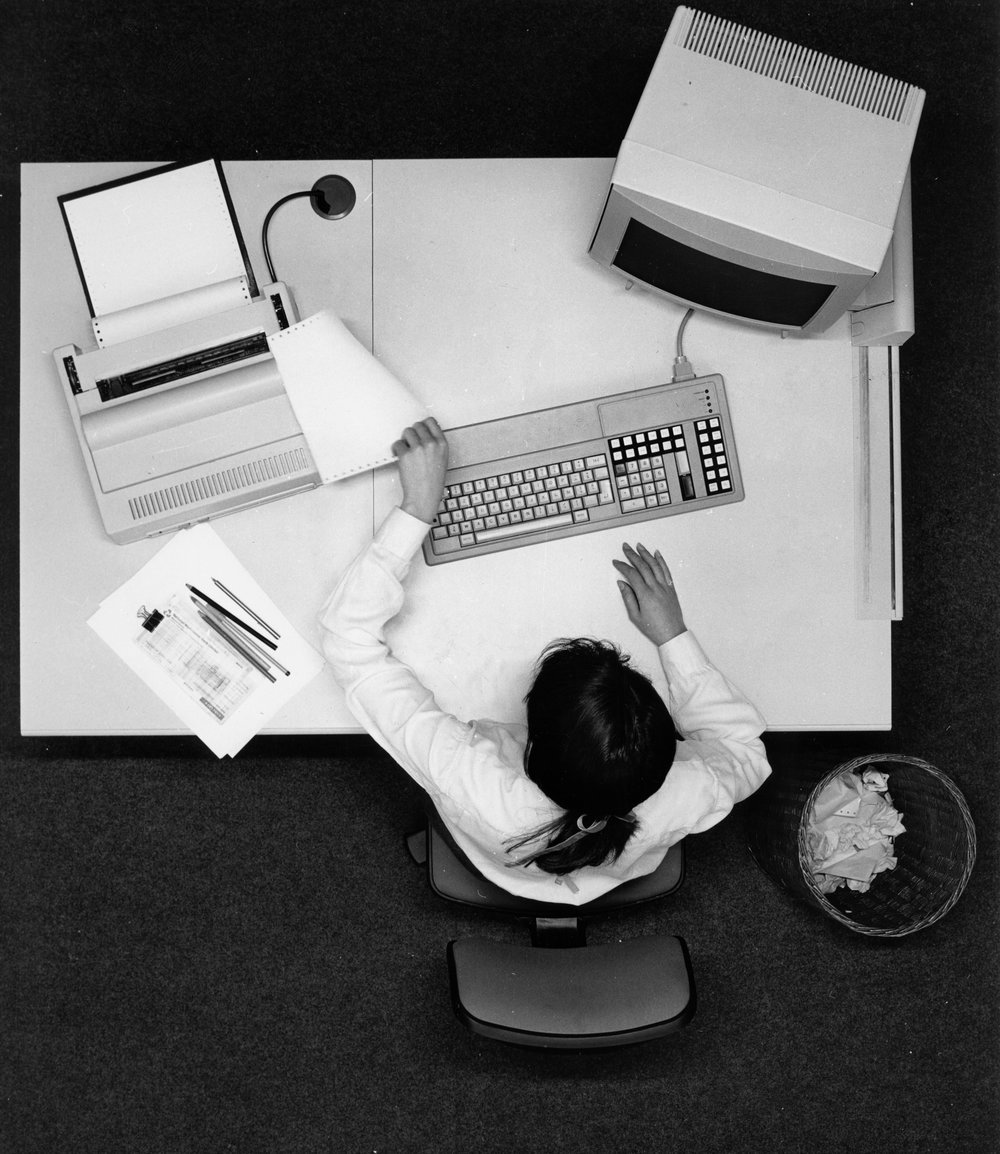
L1 system, Olivetti, 1978–79

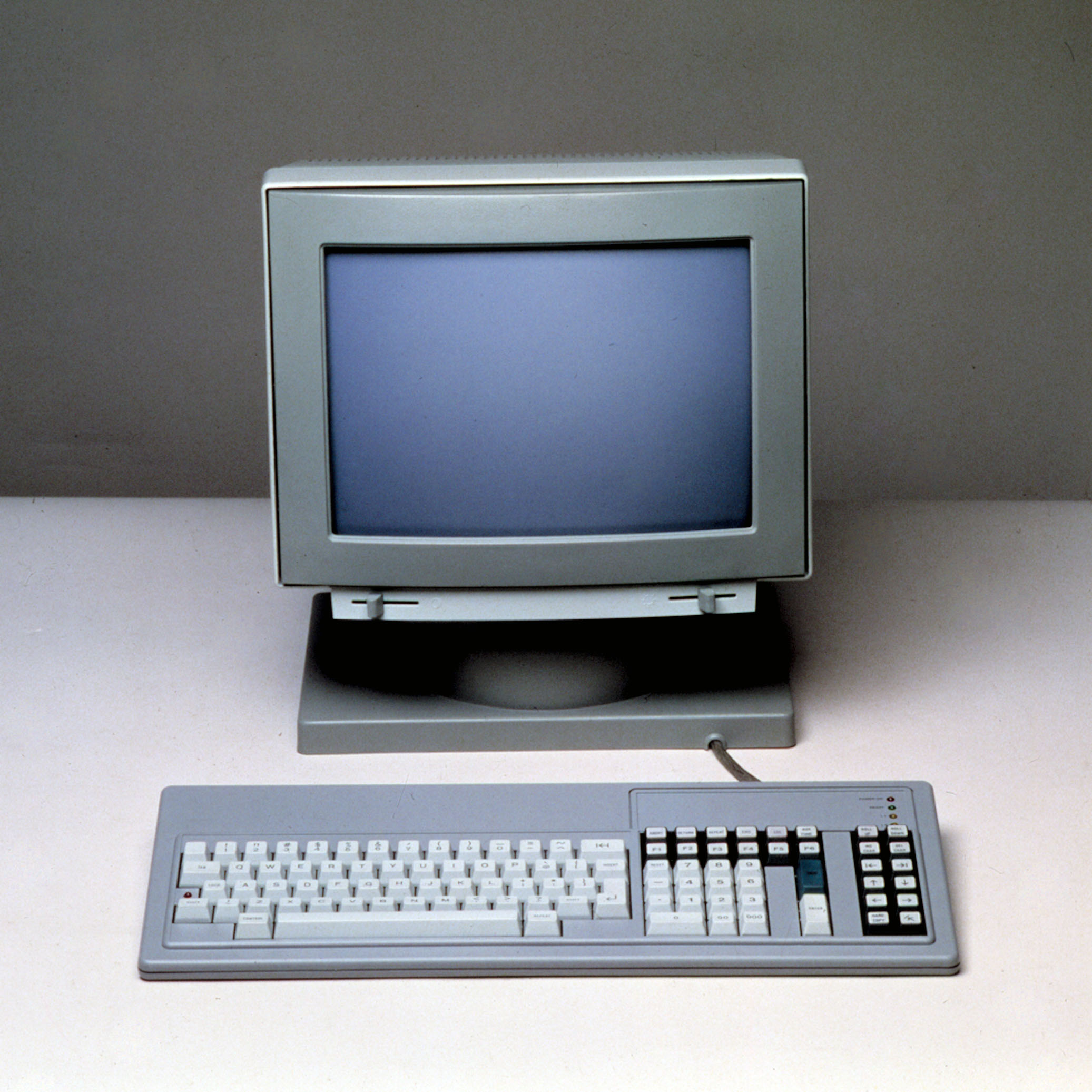
L1 system, Olivetti, 1978–1979
