= Chorreador =

Coffee-making device in Costa Rica

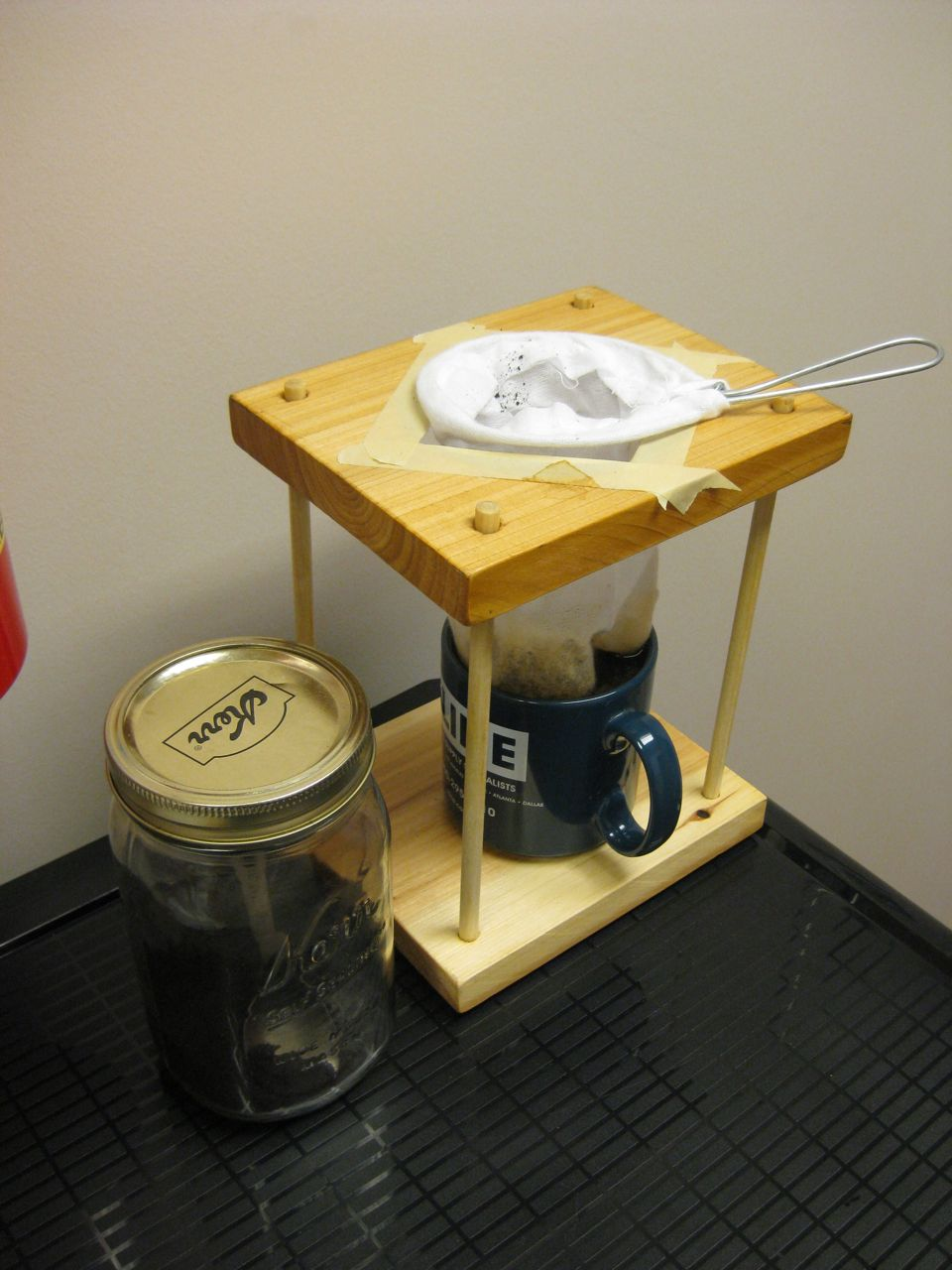
Costa Rican chorreador

A chorreador is a coffee making device used in Costa Rica in which hot water leaches through coffee grounds held in a cloth filter mounted on a wooden stand, then drips into a container.

== Design ==
The chorreador consists of a wooden stand which holds an elongated cotton bolsita (Spanish, "little bag"), shaped rather like a pocket. The mouth of the bolsita is held open by a circular wire or wooden rim that is attached to a handle. The stand is used to hold a coffee cup or coffee pot on its base, and the bolsita is suspended from the top of the chorreador stand, hanging above the container.

The chorreador can be made at home simply and cheaply with very basic carpentry and sewing skills, or it can be crafted from beautiful and decorative softwoods or hardwoods by an artisan.

== Use ==
The word chorreador is related to the Spanish verb chorrear, meaning to drip or trickle, and refers to the action of hot water seeping through the coffee grounds and dripping out. A coffee cup or pot is placed on the bottom of the stand, and fine to medium-fine ground coffee is spooned into a dry bolsita. This is then suspended from the top of the stand so it hangs over the container. Boiling water is poured slowly over the coffee grounds, and the liquid seeps through, making coffee, which drips into the waiting container.

== Care of the bolsita ==
The bolsita is always washed and dried between each use, as a dry bolsita produces the best results. It is advisable for anyone who likes to make coffee often to have more than one filter. When the coffee is made, the bolsita is rinsed afterwards with water to remove the coffee grains. Soap or detergent is never used for cleaning because they would leave an aftertaste in the coffee. In time, oils from the coffee grounds, such as caffeoyl, dye the cotton bolsita; however, the taste of the brewed coffee remains unaffected. These oils can be dissolved and removed by scrubbing the bolsita with salt about once a month, followed by a thorough rinse to remove all of the salt. A properly cared-for bolsita lasts many months.

== See also ==
- Drip brew
- French press
