= Drip coffee =

Drink made by pouring hot water onto ground coffee beans

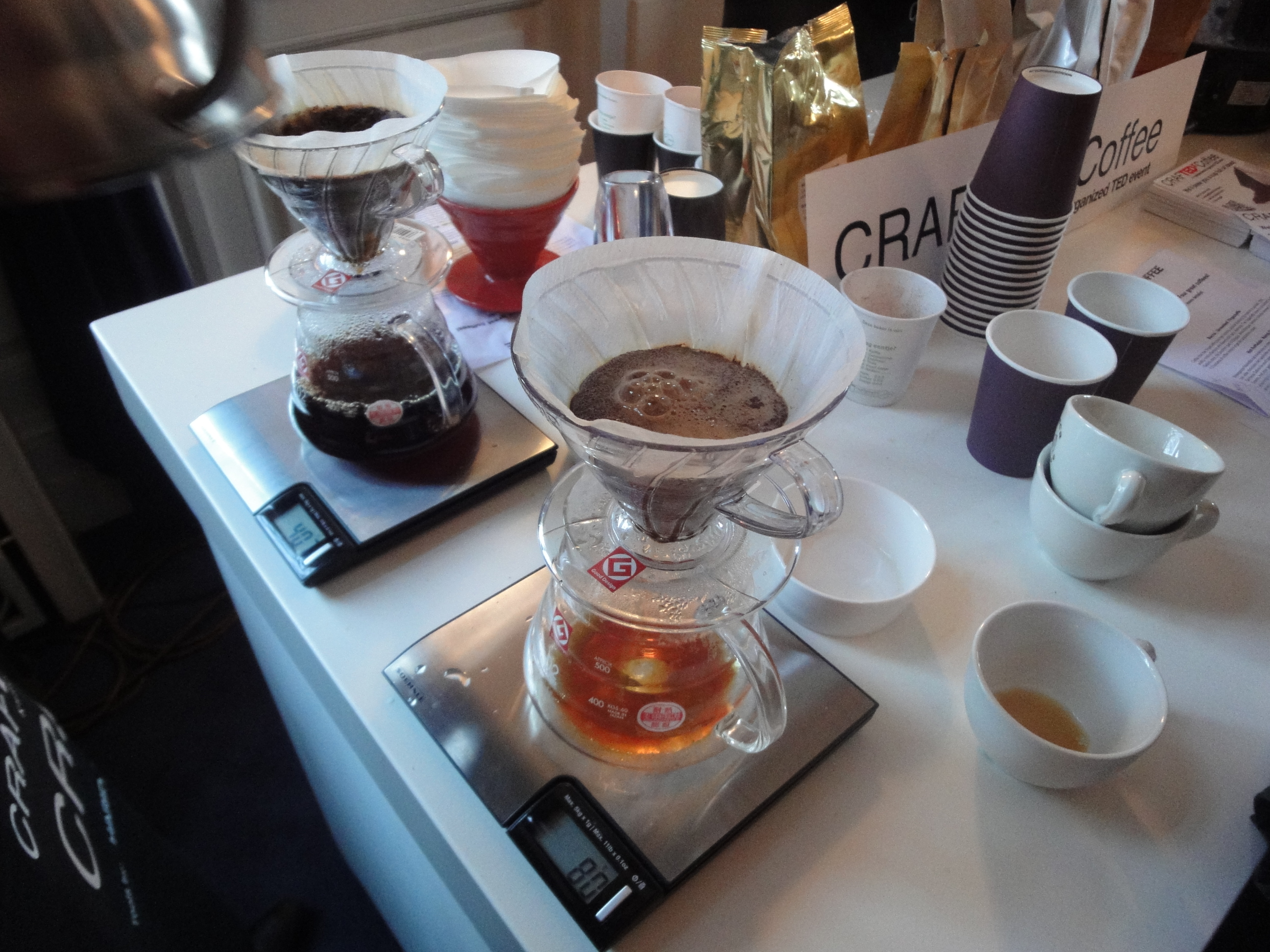
Water seeps through the ground coffee and the paper filter and is then collected in a container placed below a holder used for drip brewing.

Drip coffee is made by pouring hot water onto ground coffee beans, allowing it to brew while seeping through. There are several methods for doing this, including using a filter. Terms used for the resulting coffee often reflect the method used, such as drip-brewed coffee, or, somewhat inaccurately, filtered coffee in general. Manually brewed drip coffee is typically referred to as pour-over coffee. Water seeps through the ground coffee, absorbing its constituent chemical compounds, and then passes through a filter. The used coffee grounds are retained in the filter, while the brewed coffee is collected in a vessel such as a carafe or pot.

== History ==
Commercial paper coffee filters were invented in Germany by Melitta Bentz in 1908 and are commonly used for drip brew all over the world. In 1944, Willy Brand developed an automatic drip-brewer utilizing circular paper filters in Switzerland. In 1954, one of the first electric drip brewers, the Wigomat invented by Gottlob Widmann, was patented in Germany. Drip brew coffee makers largely replaced the coffee percolator (a device combining boiling, drip-brewing and steeping) in the 1970s due to the percolator's tendency to over-extract coffee, thereby making it bitter. One benefit of paper filters is that the used grounds and the filter may be disposed together, without a need to clean the filter. Permanent filters are also common, made of thin perforated metal sheets, fine plastic mesh, porous ceramics or glazed porcelain sieves that restrain the grounds but allow the coffee to pass, thus eliminating the need to have to purchase separate filters which sometimes cannot be found in some parts of the world. These add to the maintenance of the machine but reduce overall cost and produce less waste.

== Characteristics ==
Brewing with a paper filter produces clear, light-bodied coffee. While free of sediments, such coffee is lacking in some of coffee's oils and essences; they have been trapped in the paper filter. Metal, nylon, or porcelain mesh filters do not normally remove these components.

It may be observed, especially when using a tall, narrow carafe, that the coffee at the bottom of the coffeepot is stronger than that at the top. This is because less flavor is available for extraction from the coffee grounds as the brewing process progresses. A mathematical argument has been made that delivering comparable strength in two cups of coffee is nearly achieved using a Thue–Morse sequence of pours.

== Cultural impact ==
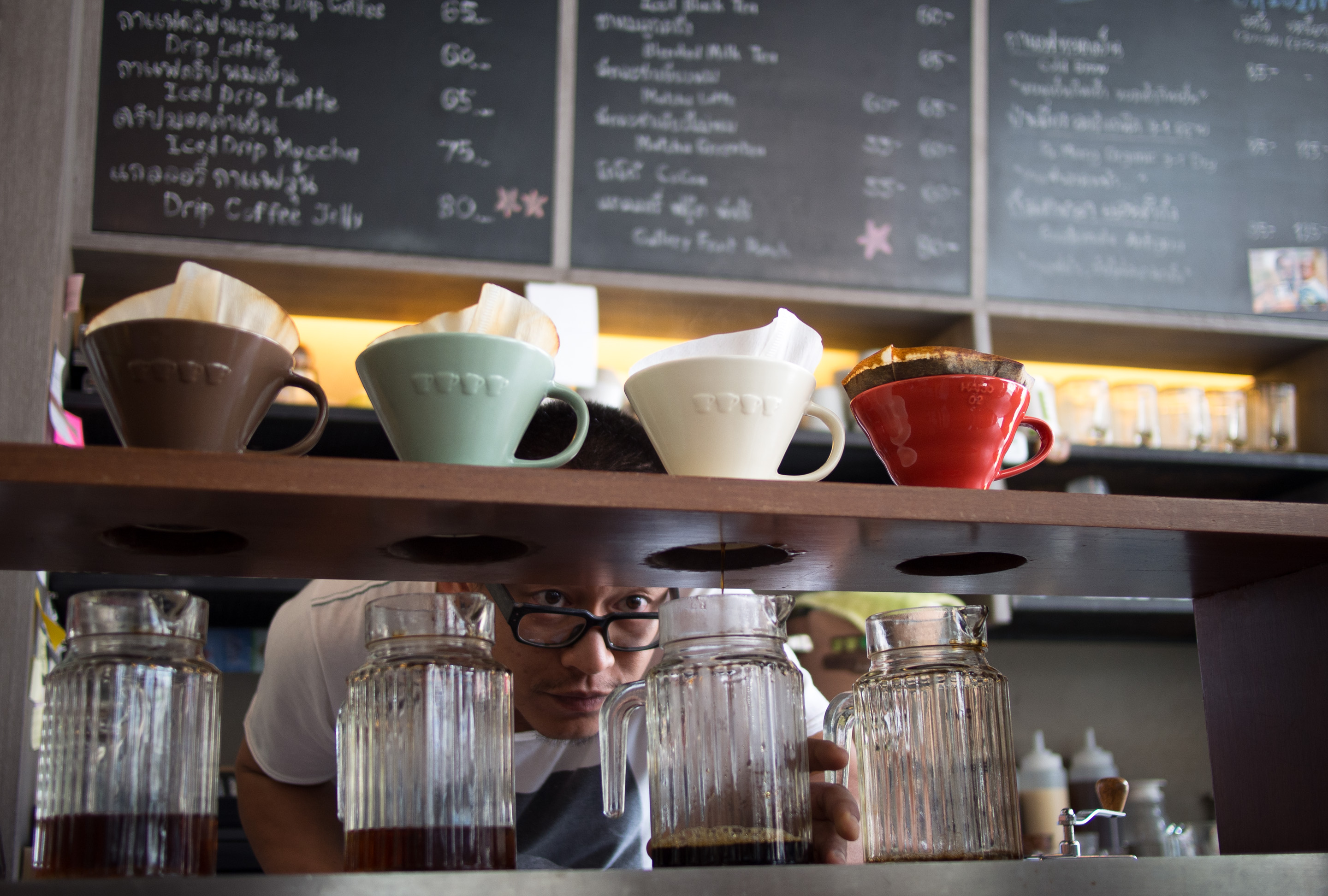
Coffee drips through coffee grounds and filters into several jars in a specialty coffee shop.

Filter coffee is central to Japanese coffee culture and connoisseurship.

In South India, filter coffee brewed at home is known as Kaapi and is a part of local culture. Most houses have a stainless-steel coffee filter and most shops sell freshly roasted and ground coffee beans. Some popular filter coffee brands include Mysore café, Hill coffee (Suresh healthcare), Cothas Coffee (Bangalore), and Narasu's Coffee (Salem). It is common in South India and Louisiana to add chicory to coffee to give it a unique taste and flavour.

== Methods ==
There are a number of methods and pieces of equipment for making drip-brewed coffee.

=== Manual pour-over coffee preparation ===
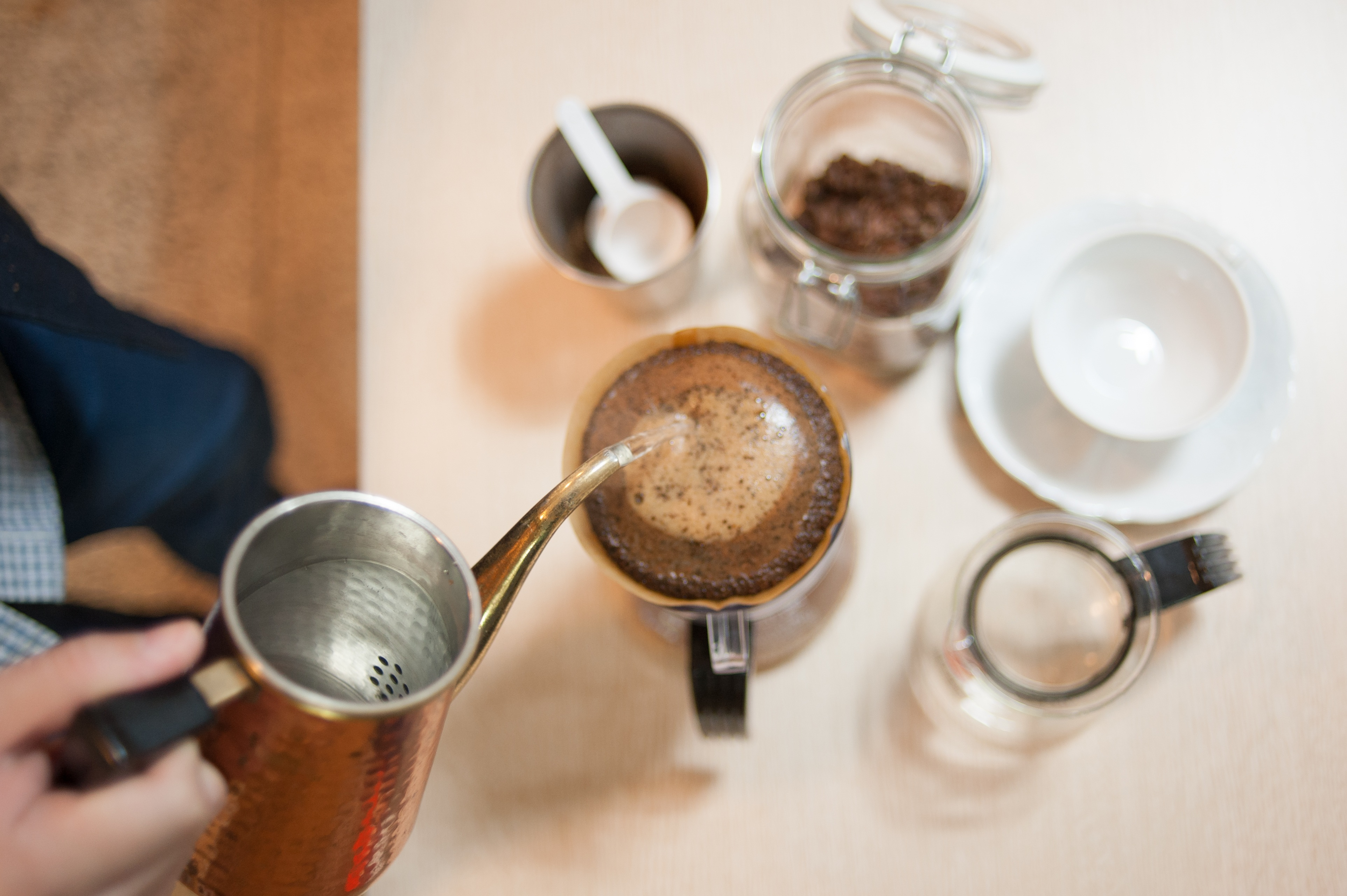
Manual drip (pour-over) coffee

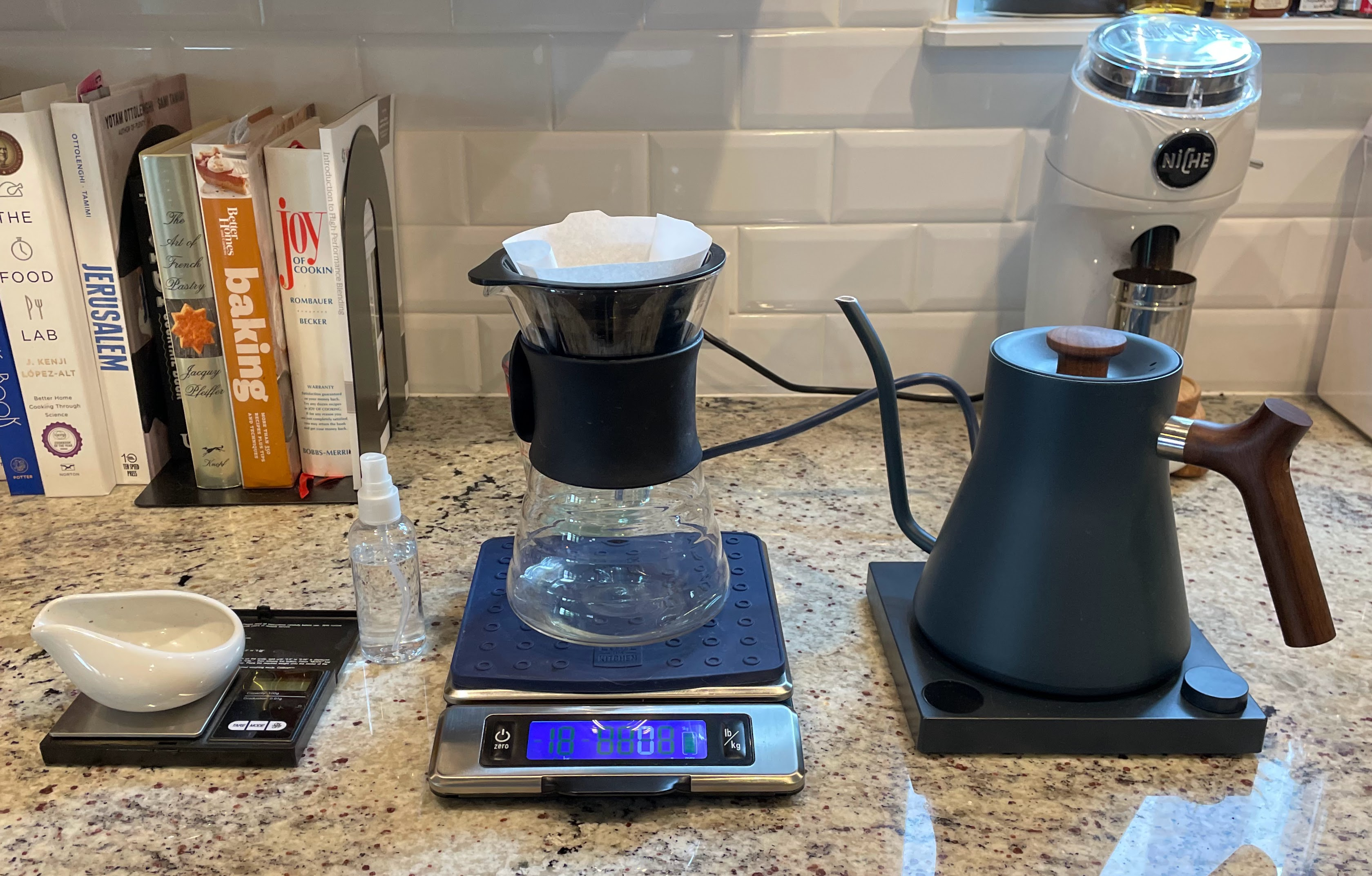
A set-up used to brew coffee, featuring (from left to right) a coffee dosing tray on a small scale, a small spritzing bottle, a V60 pour over with paper filter on a digital scale, a gooseneck kettle, and a coffee grinder

Pour-over methods are popular ways of making specialty drip coffee. The method involves pouring water over a bed of coffee (sometimes also called cake) in a filter-lined conical, trapezoid, or cylindrical chamber typically consisting of a filter and a suitable filter holder. The filtering can be with paper, cloth, plastic, ceramics, or metal.

The quality of the resulting coffee is extremely dependent on the technique of the user, with pour-over brewing being a popular method used in the World Brewers Cup.

The pour-over coffee preparation method typically starts by pouring a small amount of hot water over the paper filter to remove the paper taste then the coffee grounds are added and the surface is flattened. A small amount of hot water is poured over the coffee grounds and it is allowed to sit for about 30 to 45 seconds before continuing the pouring. This pre-wetting, called blooming, (Note: Blooming is sometimes incorrectly also called preinfusion, a term used in espresso-making.) will cause carbon dioxide to be released in bubbles or foam from the coffee grounds and helps to improve the taste. The rest of the measured water is poured slowly in circular motion over the coffee grounds for slow extraction. Adding water too fast will result in a more watery consistency while a slow pour can yield a richer taste. Unlike a french press method where coffee grounds brew in water, the pour over method allows for a more controlled aroma extraction. Agitation methods like swirling can increase extraction.

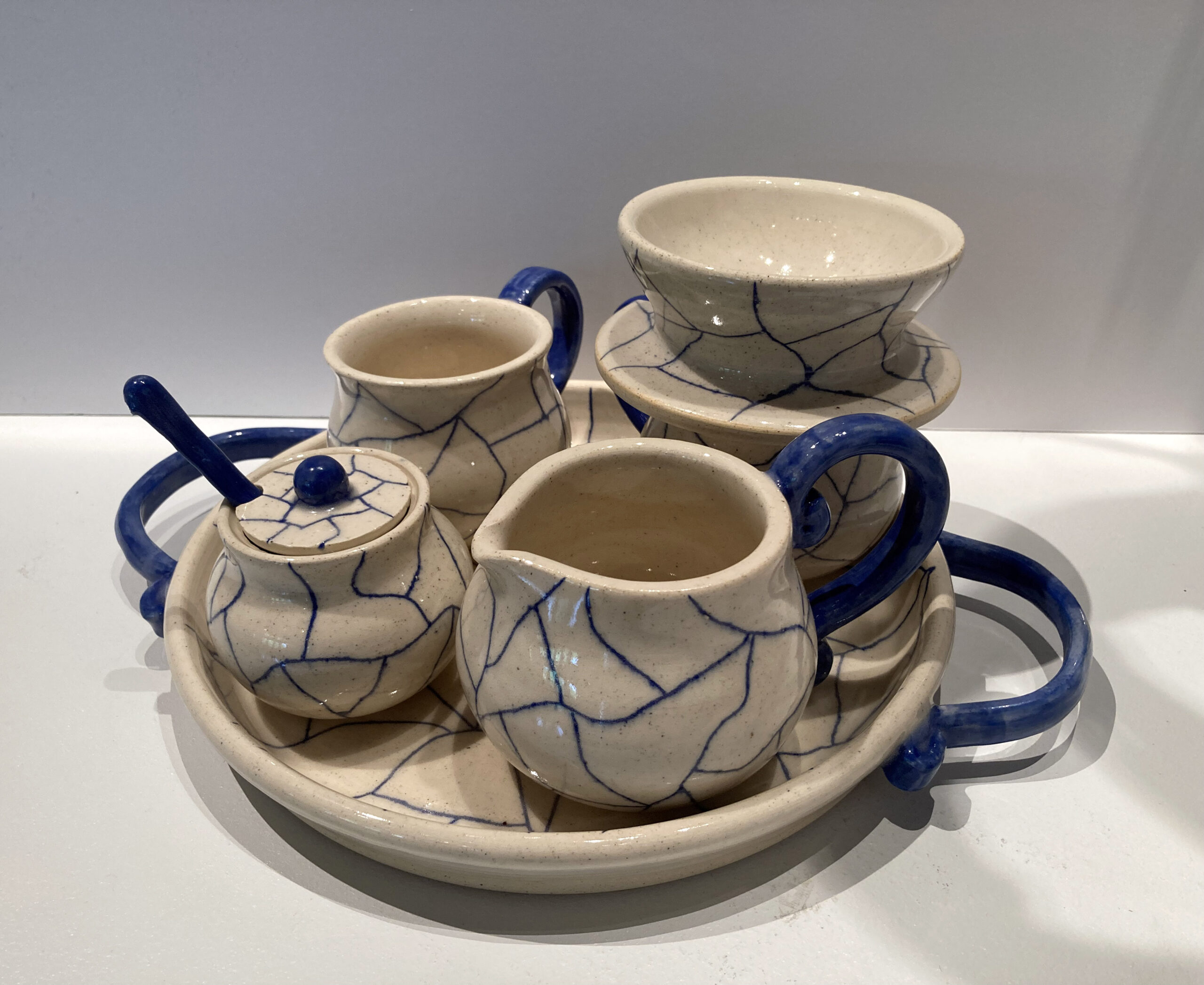
Ceramic Pour-over Set, includes two mugs, one pour-over, one creamer pitcher, and one sugar jar with a spoon and a lid

There are several manual drip-brewing devices on the market, offering more control over brewing parameters than automatic machines, and which incorporate stopper valves and other innovations that offer greater control over steeping time and the proportion of coffee to water. There also exist small, portable, single-serving drip brew makers that only hold the filter and rest on top of a mug or cup, making them a popular option for backcountry campers and hikers. Hot water is poured in and drips directly into the cup.

Different filter shapes and sizes exist, most notable the (paper) coffee filter systems introduced by Melitta (1908, 1932, 1936, 1965), Chemex (1941), and Hario (2004).

=== Manual drip-coffee makers ===
==== Bavarian coffee pot ====
In 1812, Benjamin Thompson (Count Rumford), had published an essay of his on improvements to an Italian coffee bean roaster, along with improvements to the Bavarian Coffee pot.

==== Cafetière du Belloy and similar coffee makers ====
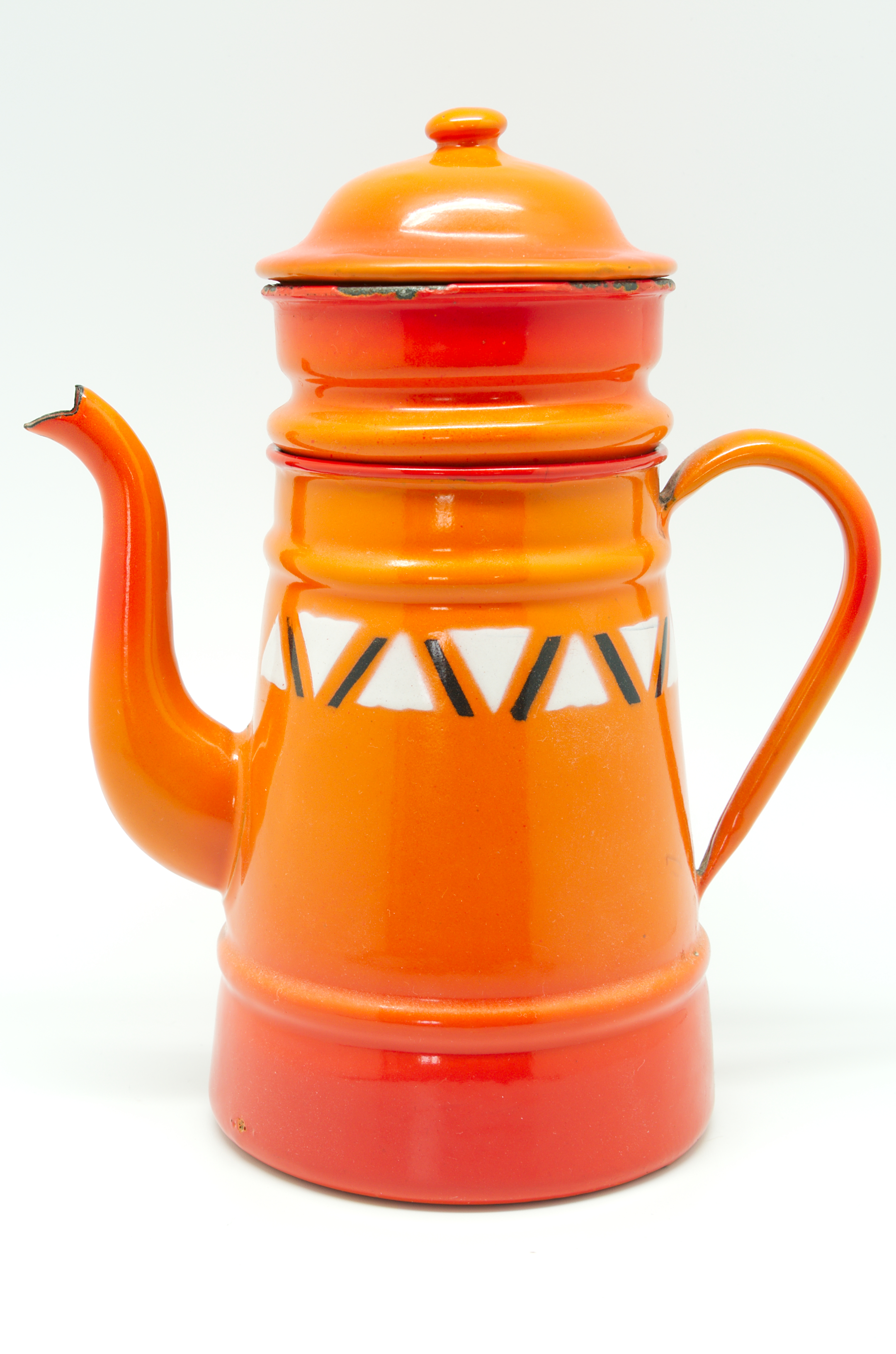
Enameled metal French drip coffee pot

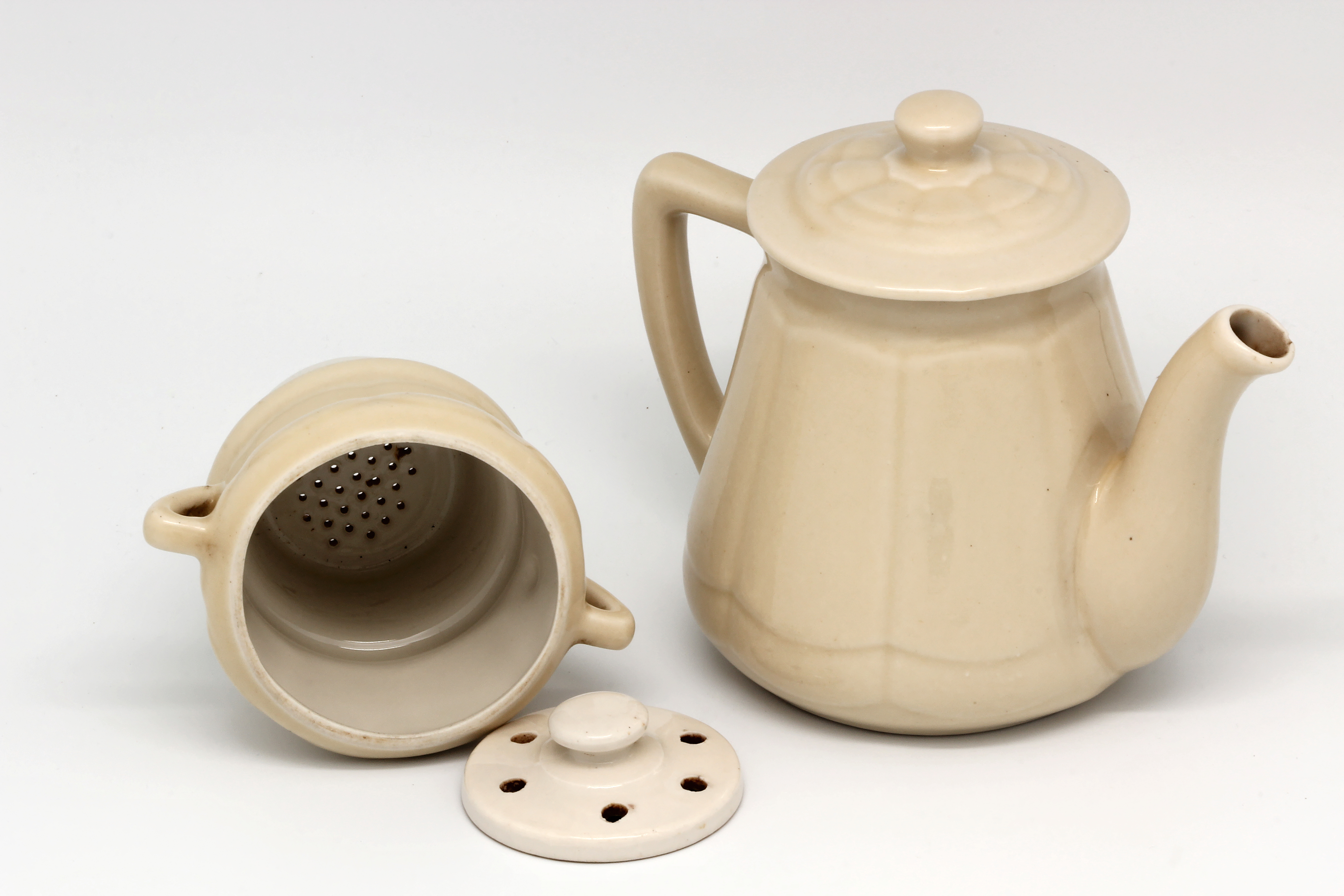
Porcelain French drip coffee pot, with round drilled holes of the filter visible

Manual drip coffee makers include the so-called French drip coffee pot (invented in 1795 by François-Antoine-Henri Descroizilles and manufactured by a metal-smith in Rouen, then popularized by bishop Jean-Baptiste de Belloy for why it became known as Cafetière du Belloy in Paris since 1800 to the point that it was sometimes incorrectly attributed to the bishop himself), the Grègue (café grègue, café coulé, etc.) originating from La Réunion and also common in Louisiana, and the so-called Arndt'sche Caffee-Aufgussmaschine (Quedlinburg, Germany, c. 1900). French drip devices emerged from the earlier coffee biggins where cloth filters would be fully inserted into the pot for steeping instead of drip filtering. French drip coffee pots don't use paper filters but a permanent filter featuring many small round drilled holes made out of (enameled) metal, ceramics or porcelain. A cafetière du Belloy was originally made out of tin, later versions were made out of silver, copper, ceramics or porcelain. The Grègue and the Arndt'sche Caffee-Aufgussmaschine are built out of (enameled) metal. To avoid sediments in the coffee, coarsely ground coffee has to be used.

Around 1895, skyblue enameled metal coffee pots named Madam Blå were introduced in Denmark by Glud & Marstrand. They looked similar to French drip coffee pots, but used cotton filters and were available in 18 sizes for up to 50cups of coffee.

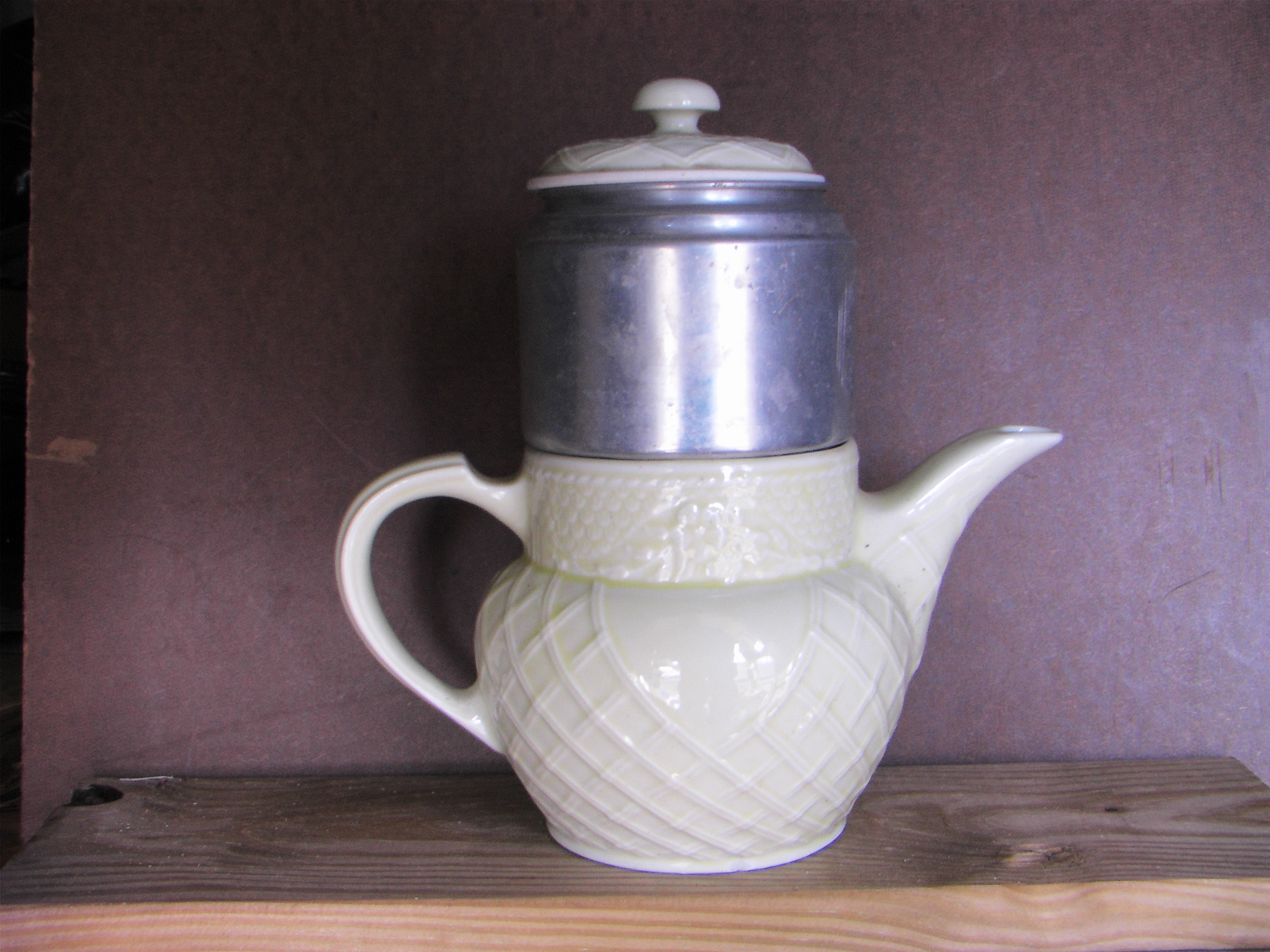
A complete Drip-O-lator unit

The Drip-O-lator is an American coffee pot for making drip coffee patented in 1921 and 1930 and manufactured in Massillon, Ohio, or Macon, Georgia, United States. The production of Drip-O-lators ceased in the middle of the twentieth century. The pots have become collectibles similar to bric-à-brac.

In the 1930s, the German company Melitta produced a series of manual coffee makers called Kaffeefiltriermaschine ("coffee filtering machine"). They worked on the principle of French drip coffee pots, but used a paper filter and allowed to pour the whole amount of water at once instead of having to pour several times.

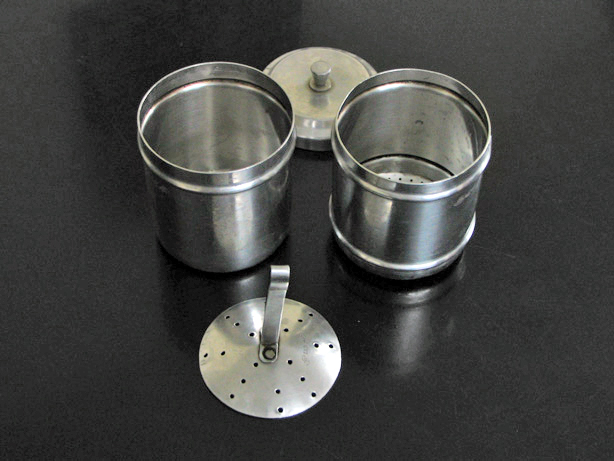
Metal South Indian coffee filter disassembled

In south India the use of a two part cylindrical, stainless steel filter is common in the production of Indian filter coffee.

==== Flip coffee pots ====
A less familiar form of drip brewing is the reversible or "flip" pot commonly known as Napoletana (1819) and late-19th century variants like the Russian reversible pot aka Russian egg, the reversible Potsdam cafetière aka Potsdam boiler, or the Arndt'sche Sturzmaschine (c. 1920).

==== Karlsbad-style coffee makers ====
A variant of the category of French drip coffee pots is the group of "Bohemian" coffee pots including the original Karlsbad coffee makers, historically produced by several mostly Bohemian porcelain manufacturers since 1878 up into the first half of the 20th century, and variants produced by Siegmund Paul Meyer (SPM) / Walküre since 1910, now Friesland (FPM). In contrast to French drip coffee pots which feature round holes, they all use a special double-layered cross-slit strainer made from through-glazed porcelain. Before World War I, they were very popular in the Viennese coffee house culture. The special kind of drip coffee they produce is called a Karlsbader ("Karlsbad coffee").

==== System Büttner coffee makers ====
System Büttner coffee makers are a type of coffee makers featuring a special permanent through-glazed porcelain filter with triangularly-arranged slits and a valving mechanism to combine steeping with drip-brewing. They were invented in 1926 by the coffee roaster Carl A. Büttner (Berlin, Germany) and produced up into, at least, the 1940s by the porcelain manufacturer Bauscher (Weiden, Germany) for various German coffee roasters and distributors.

=== Automatic drip-coffee makers ===
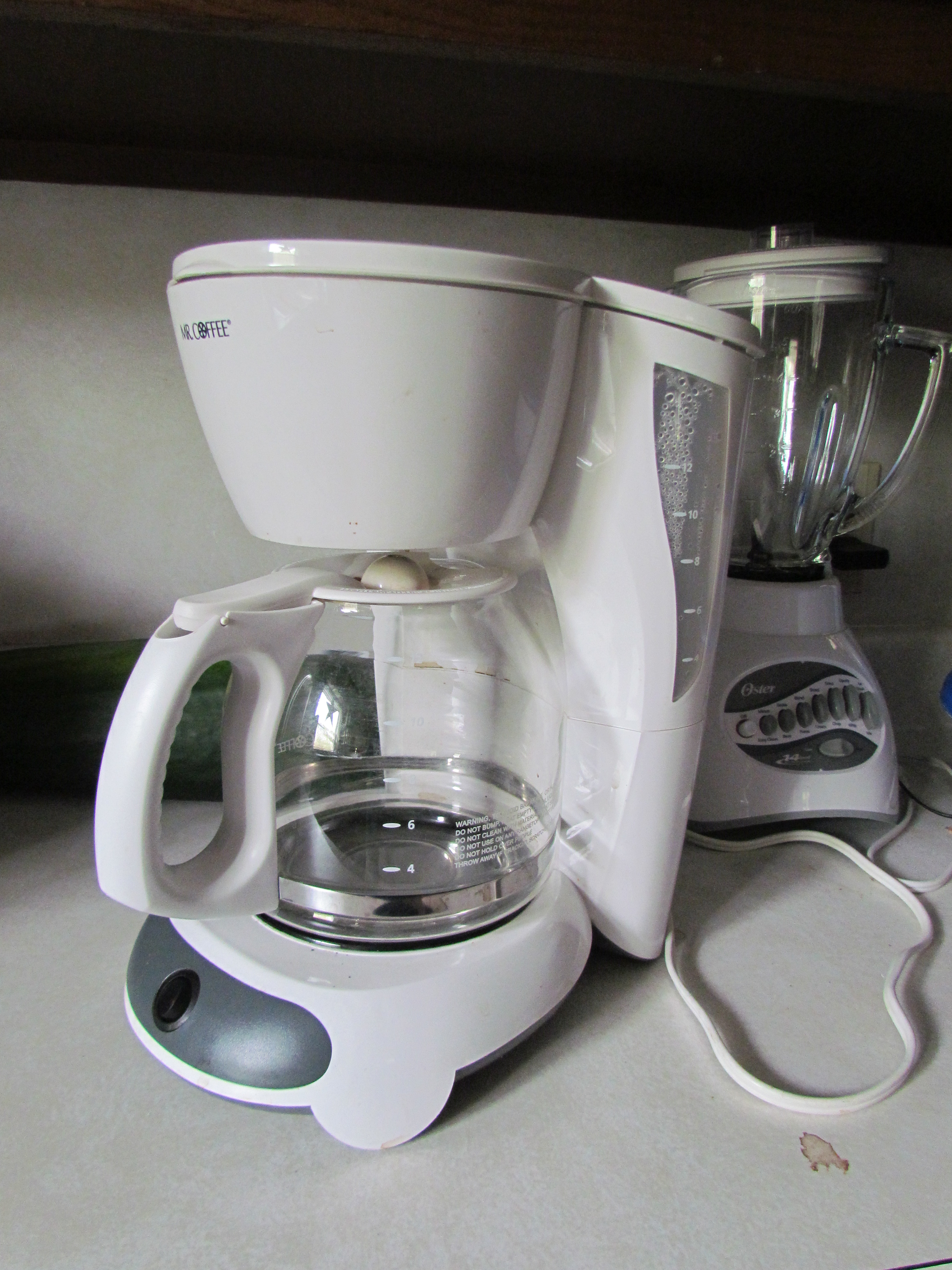
Specimen of Mr. Coffee drip machine

The full process of brewing a cup of coffee with Moccamaster drip coffee maker takes around four minutes.

==== Electric drip-coffee makers ====
One of the first electrical drip coffee makers was the German Wigomat, patented in 1954. In the early 1970s electrical drip coffee makers became more common, causing a decline in manual drip coffee preparation methods until the 2010s, and the near-extinction of coffee percolators. Among the early electrical drip coffee machines was a machine designed by two former Westinghouse engineers and sold under the brand Mr. Coffee in the early 1970s.

It normally works by admitting water from a cold-water reservoir into a flexible hose in the base of the reservoir leading directly to a thin metal tube or heating chamber (usually, of aluminium), where a heating element surrounding the metal tube heats the water. The heated water moves through the machine using the thermosiphon principle. Thermally induced pressure and the siphoning effect move the heated water through an insulated rubber or vinyl riser hose, into a spray head, and onto the ground coffee, which is contained in a brew basket mounted below the spray head. The coffee passes through a filter and drips down into the carafe. A one-way valve in the tubing prevents water from siphoning back into the reservoir. The carafe, usually made of glass, rests on a warming plate that keeps the brewed coffee warm. A thermostat attached to the heating element turns off the heating element as needed to prevent overheating the water in the metal tube (overheating would produce only steam in the supply hose), then turns back on when the water cools below a certain threshold. For a standard 10- to 12-cup drip coffeemaker, using a more powerful thermostatically controlled heating element (in terms of wattage produced), can heat increased amounts of water more quickly using larger heating chambers, generally producing higher average water temperatures at the spray head over the entire brewing cycle. This process can be further improved by changing the aluminium construction of most heating chambers to a metal with superior heat transfer qualities, such as copper.

Throughout the latter part of the 20th century, a number of inventors patented various coffeemaker designs using an automated form of the drip brew method. Subsequent designs have featured changes in heating elements, spray head, and brew-basket design, as well as the addition of timers and clocks for automatic-start, water filtration, filter and carafe design, drip stop, and even built-in coffee grinding mechanisms.

The Specialty Coffee Association (SCA) certifies home coffee makers, including electric drip brewers, that pass independent laboratory testing against its standards for brewing quality.

== See also ==
- Chorreador
- Coffeemaker
- Cold drip coffee
- French press
- Indian filter coffee
- List of coffee drinks
- Soft-brew coffee
- Trojan Room coffee pot
- Vacuum coffee maker
