= Stefan Diez =

German designer

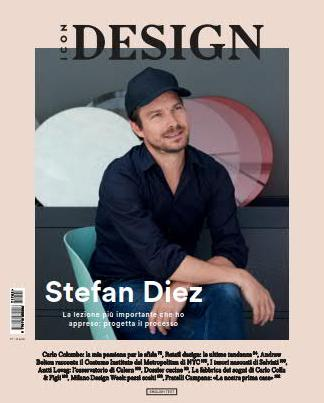
- Stefan Diez in Icon Design, May 2017
- Born: 1971 (age 54–55); Freising, Germany
- Education: State Academy of Fine Arts Stuttgart
- Occupation: Industrial designer
- Website: diezoffice.com

Stefan Diez (born 1971 in Freising) is a German industrial designer whose Munich-based studio, DIEZ OFFICE, develops furniture, accessories, and exhibition designs.

== Early life and education ==
Diez was born in 1971 in Freising, Germany, to a family of "4th-generation carpenters". Diez grew up around carpentry and cabinetmaking, which influenced his design. He was introduced to furniture design in 1991, when he worked as a cabinetmaker for three years. After spending a year working in Mumbai, and Pune, India, he returned to Germany in 1996.

He matriculated at the State Academy of Fine Arts Stuttgart, where he earned a Bachelor of Industrial Design in 2002 while studying under Richard Sapper.

== Career ==
Diez worked for Richard Sapper then Konstantin Grcic. He founded his own design studio in January 2003. Since then, he has worked in fields of design including furniture, tableware, industrial design, and exhibition design for companies like Brunner, e15, Gandiablasco, HAY, Herman Miller, Magis, Midgard, Moroso, Rosenthal, Thonet, Vibia, Wilkhahn, Wagner, and others. His "Upon Bench" debuted at imm Cologne in 2007 to critical acclaim. His Model No. 404 chair was influenced by the work of Michael Thonet and is produced by Thonet.

Many of his products have received international design awards, including the IF Gold Award and, for his 2024 Magis Costume modular sofa, Comapasso d'Oro.

Starting in 2007, he started teaching at the Karlsruhe University of Arts and Design, and in 2015 he joined the faculty of Lund University's School of Industrial Design in Lund, Sweden. Since 2018, he has served as the Head of Industrial Design at the University of Applied Arts Vienna.

=== Sustainability ===
Stefan Diez considers circular design to be a key principle of his product design philosophy, and his products often utilize a sustainable approach by incorporating multipurposeness and durability. His AYNO lamp, designed for Midgard, received the 2021 German Sustainability Award.

=== Selected works ===
- MUDRA for BRUNNER chair family 2022
- PLUSMINUS for VIBIA lighting system 2022
- 4th WALL with VIBIA AND MANY OTHERS temporary installation 2021–2022
- COSTUME for MAGIS modular sofa 2021
- MOD for SAMMODE lighting system 2021
- AYNO for MIDGARD lighting family 2020
- SHIRO for SCHÖNWALD tableware 2019
- HOUDINI 10 YEARS for E15 wooden chair family 2019
- D1 for WAGNER office chair collection
- FALLSTAFF for armchair 2018
- NEW ORDER for HAY furniture system
- 404 for THONET chair

== Selected awards ==
=== 2022 ===
- 2022 AW Designer of the year

=== 2021 ===
- The Good Design Gold Award for Costume by MAGIS
- German Design award 2022 for D2 by Wagner
- Archiproducts Design Awards for Costume by MAGIS with special mention for sustainability

=== 2020 ===
- Deutscher Nachhaltigkeitspreis – The National German Sustainability Award 2020 for AYNO by Midgard
- German Design Award in Gold 2020 for SHIRO by Schönwald
- German Design Award 2020, Excellent Product Design, for RGB by Burgbad

=== 2019 ===
- 2019 Wallpaper Design Award für Pendelleuchte "Guise"
- 2019 Architectural Digest The Cleverest Awards 2019 for RGB by Burgbad

=== 2018 ===
- 2018 Red Dot Best of the Best Award für Stuhl "D1"
- Interior Innovation Award imm Cologne, winner of the "best of the best award" for the product "D1" by Wagner
- German Design Award 2018 winner for the product "GUISE" by Vibia
- Red Dot Best of the Best Award 2018 for the product"GUISE" by Vibia

=== 2016 ===
- Red Dot Best of the Best Award für Kaminofen "Logastyle Lucrum"
- German Design Award 2016 for the project "LOGASTYLE LUCRUM" by Buderus

=== 2015 ===
- Red Dot Award 2015, for the product "YARD" Lounge chair by EMU
- Wallpaper* Design Award, Best grid for the product "YARD" Armchair by EMU

=== 2011 ===
- 2011 2 × Red Dot Best of the Best Award für "Chassis" und "Homme"

=== 2007 ===
- 2007 Materialica Design & Technology Award

=== 2006 ===
- Designpreis der Bundesrepublik Deutschland in Silber (2006) für sein für Thomas gestaltetes Oven-to-table Programm (feuerfestes Geschirr)

=== 2004 ===
- interior innovation award der internationalen Möbelmesse imm cologne (2004)
- Internationaler Designpreis Baden-Württemberg, GER (2004) »Genio« + »Tema«
- Die Gute Industrieform / iF, GER (2004) »Genio« + »Tema«

=== 2002 ===
- Bayerischer Staatspreis für Nachwuchsdesigner (2002)
- Design Report Award (2002)

== Selected publications ==
- Archiproducts
- Baunetz
- NOMAD MAGAZINE
- AW Designer of the year 2022
- DAMN MAGAZINE
- Goethe Institut
- Diez, Stefan (2017). Hofmeister, Sandra; Hesse, Petra (eds.). Diez Office: Full House. Cologne: Koenig: Koenig Books. ISBN 9783960980728.
