= Wigomat =

Drip coffee maker

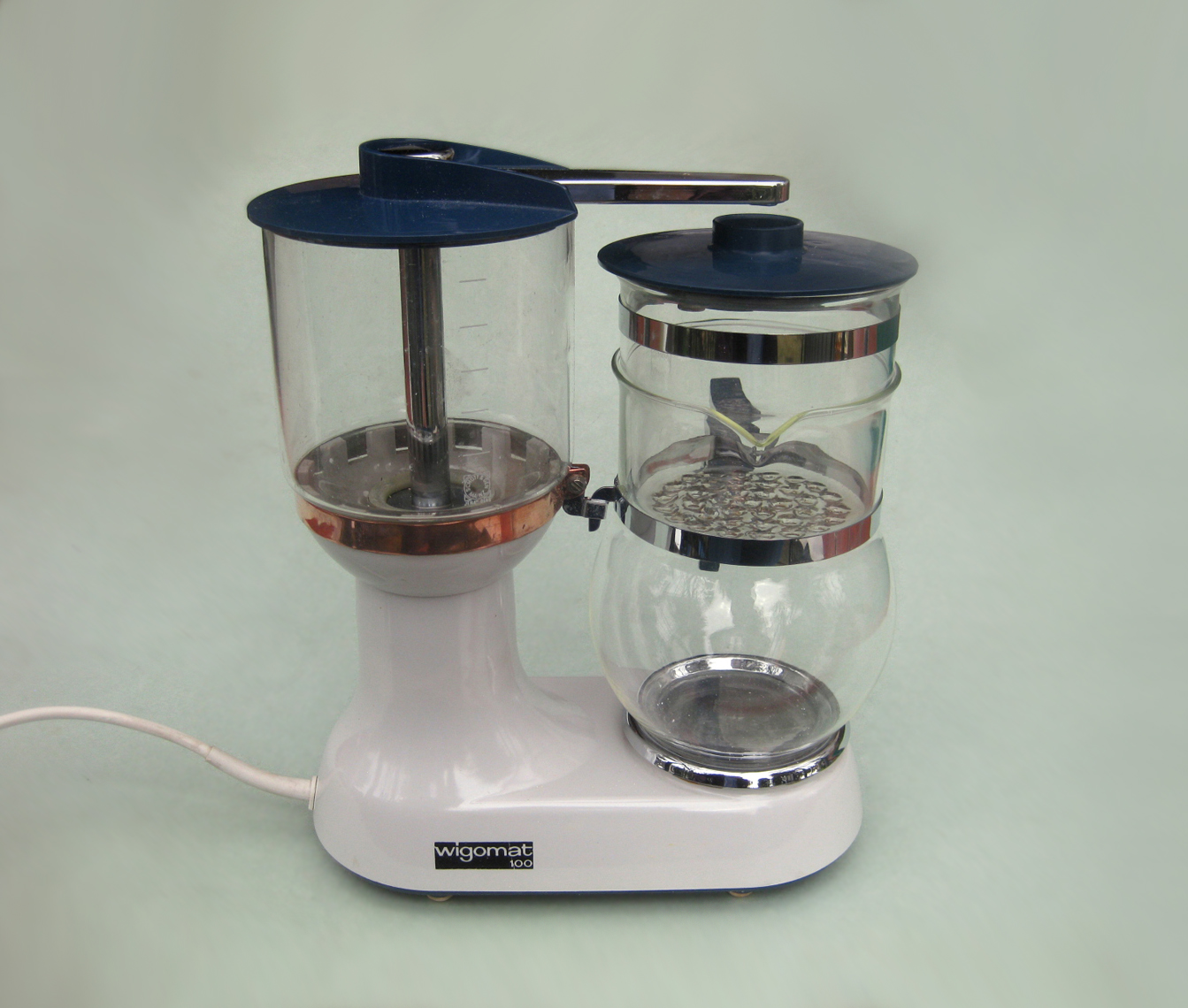
Wigomat 100, the slightly redesigned version of 1958

The Wigomat was one of the world's first electric drip coffee makers, patented in 1954 in Germany. It was named after its manufacturer, Gottlob Widmann, although some early machines were delivered as "FK-1" (for filter coffee machine).

== History ==
Coffee was, until the late 1950s, brewed by hand or made in a percolator. In both cases the temperature was considered to be too high. Therefore, at the launch of the Wigomat it was advertised to have the best brewing temperature. In the 1970s many machines followed the principle of drip coffee, but the Wigomat remained a competitor: "The people at Zabar's tell us that their Wigomat Coffee Maker is one of the best of the currently popular instant-drip coffee makers" wrote a New York-based magazine in 1975.
