= Edra =

Italian furniture company

Edra s.p.a. is an Italian manufacturing company specialized in the creation of innovative designer furniture.

== History ==
The name "Edra" is a modification of the Greek word "έδρα", meaning a place for philosophical discussion. Founded in 1987, Edra is an international design furniture company that is based in Italy. It is known for manufacturing designs that challenge preconceived notions of how a chair, sofa, table, bed, storage cabinet, or even a mirror can look. Working with several critically-acclaimed designers like Francesco Binfaré, Humberto and Fernando Campana, and Jacopo Foggini – all of whom use materials and technologies in unexpected ways combined with artistic tradition to create furniture and objects that are profoundly sculptural seemingly often with no historic aesthetic precedent.

== Important designer collaborations ==
In 1992, Binfaré was invited by Massimo Morozzi to design for Edra. His early work for Edra included L'Homme et la Femme (1993), Tangeri (1994) and Angels (1996). In the 21st century, Binfare has created a number of new seating icons – On the Rocks (2004), Flap (2006), Absolu (2015), and Essential (2016).

Humberto and Fernando have been frequent collaborators with Edra creating numerous award-winning designs that include chairs, sofas, tables, cabinets, beds, lighting, and mirrors. All of their work is seemingly underscored by the assembly – nailing, riveting, stitching, knotting, welding, clipping – of individual elements into an overall form.

Having long experimented with manipulating polycarbonate by hand rather than mold, Foggini has created several chair designs for Edra including Alice, Ella, Gila, and Gina.

== Edra designs included in museum collections ==
MOMA – Flap Sofa (2000); Vermelha (1993); Corallo (2004)

Cooper Hewitt – Vermelha (1993)

Museum of Fine Arts, Houston – Vermelha (1993), Favela (1991)

Metropolitan Museum of Art – Favela (1991)

San Francisco Museum of Modern Art – Favela (1991)

== See also ==
- List of Italian companies
