= Budapest Fashion Week =

Fashion week trade show held in Budapest, Hungary

- Genre: Clothing and fashion exhibitions
- Frequency: Semi-annually
- Locations: Budapest, Hungary
- Participants: Local designers and International designers from Budapest
- Area: Palazzo Dorottya
- Organiser: Eve Hajnal, Kriszta Dora
- People: Anda, Anh Tuan, Je Suis Belle, Nanushka, Use Unused, Nubu, Kata Szegedi, Daniel Benus, Dora Abodi, Dóra Konsánszky, Dora Mojzes

Budapest Fashion Week is a fashion week trade show held annually in April and October in Budapest, Hungary, usually after the five major fashion weeks. It is still aspiring to the level of big five fashion weeks (New York City, London, Paris, Milan and Berlin). Based on the concept of the international fashion week series, TONI&GUY Fashion Week Budapest is an event, where the leading Hungarian fashion designers and international designers gain platform to introduce their seasonal collections twice a year for the Hungarian and international fashion industry and the public as well. The event is usually held in the Palazzo Dorottya.

== Location ==
The Spring-Summer 2019 edition of Budapest Fashion Week was hosted at the Várkert Bazár in the capital of Budapest.

== Purpose and organizer ==
Budapest Fashion Week's aim is to get together the talented young fashion designers with the innovative brands for a successful and most “talked about” event for communication and socially responsible purposes. Based on the concept of the international fashion week series, TONI&GUY Fashion Week Budapest is an event, where the leading Hungarian fashion designers gain platform to introduce their seasonal collections twice a year for the Hungarian and international fashion industry and the public as well. The long-term goal of the event is to build a position for the Hungarian designers on the local and also on the international markets and to revive Hungarian fashion and textile industry.

The organizer of this event is BigBag PR Agency, which is a boutique strategic communications firm specializes in fashion and beauty. Based on industry experiences – with a background in fashion journalism – the agency develop programs that launch, grow, or re-establish brand's presence and deliver consistent brand message. The agency's aim is to reinvigorate the professional Hungarian fashion life, that is why the organizers created TONI&GUY Fashion Week Budapest.

Budapest Fashion Week is not limited to Hungarian designers alone. Labels from other central European countries including Poland, Czech Republic, Romania, Slovenia and Ukraine are also featured. These designers are working to change the way Budapest fashion is perceived by incorporating unique color palettes, fabrics, and silhouettes.

Sandra Sandor has reached a higher popularity status than most other designers featured in Budapest Fashion Week. Sandor developed her brand named Nanushka in 2005, immediately after graduating from the London College of Fashion. Sandor is known for her knit sweaters, satin dresses with tie-waist details, striped linen pants, vegan leather puffers and belt bags. For each collection she chooses a clashing culture theme. For example, her Spring 2018 collection represents a mix of “far Eastern culture and wild Western Americana”.

Nanushka's bold designs, made from luxurious fabrics and sold at contemporary price points, distinguish the brand from many others. It has gained international recognition and is sold through retailers such as Net-a-Porter, Mytheresa, Nordstrom, and Moda Operandi. Fashion models Gigi Hadid and Caroline de Maigret have worn Nanushka designs. The brand has been featured twice at New York Fashion Week, and plans have been announced to open stores in New York and Los Angeles in the coming years. Through her work and the brand's growing popularity, Sandor has contributed to establishing Budapest as a fashion hub.

== Live video stream ==
Budapest Fashion Week became one of the first fashion weeks to fully embrace digital media when it offered all designers who were showing their collections on the catwalk the opportunity to broadcast their shows live on the internet by UStream. The video stream can be seen on Budapest Fashion Week's website and on UStream channels.

The full live stream is no longer available on UStream but short clips can be found on YouTube.

== Sponsors ==
The general sponsor of the event is TONI&GUY global hairdressing and training business company, and further major sponsors are Mercedes-Benz, Samsung, MAC Cosmetics, Sony, and UPC among others.

== See also ==
- New York Fashion Week
- Berlin Fashion Week
- Milan Fashion Week
- Paris Fashion Week
- London Fashion Week
