= Nathalie Du Pasquier =

French designer (born 1957)

- Born: 1957 (age 68–69); Bordeaux, France
- Movement: Memphis Group
- Spouse: George Sowden
- Website: nathaliedupasquier.com

Nathalie Du Pasquier (born 1957) is a Milan-based artist and designer mostly known for her work as a founding member of the Memphis Group. Her early body of work includes furniture, textiles, clothing designs and jewelry in addition to iconic work in decoration and patterns. Since 1987, she has dedicated herself to painting.

== Early life ==
Du Pasquier was born in Bordeaux, France, in 1957. Her mother was an art historian, which gave Du Pasquier an appreciation for classic art. In 1975 she completed her high school education. After that, from 1975 to 1977, she traveled through Gabon and West Africa, and in 1979 she moved to Milan. She did not attain a secondary formal education after high school, rather citing her travels as her primary inspirations. Du Pasquier drew artistic influence from African art and music.

== Career ==
=== Post Modern ===
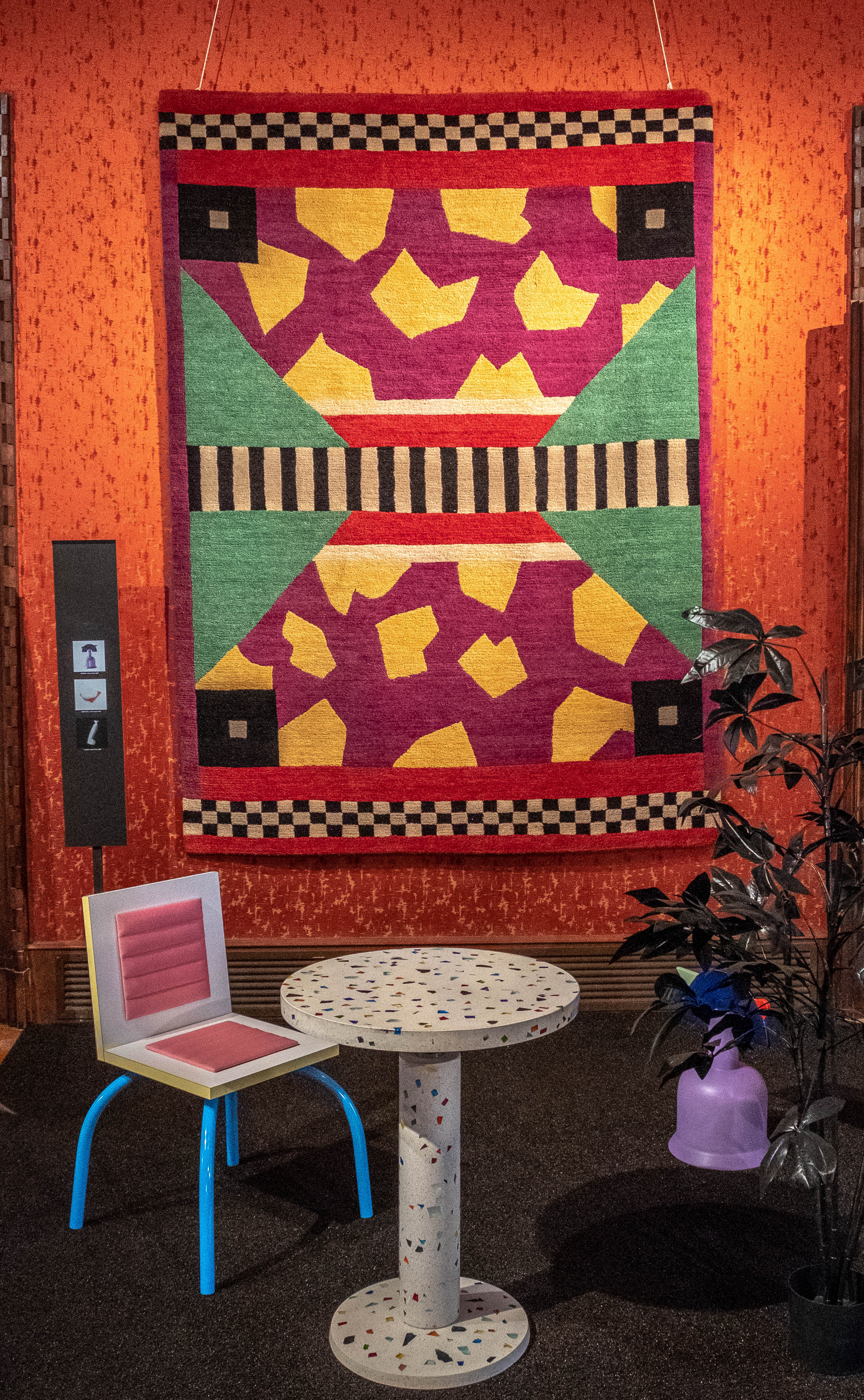
Carpet by Nathalier Du Pasquier 1985

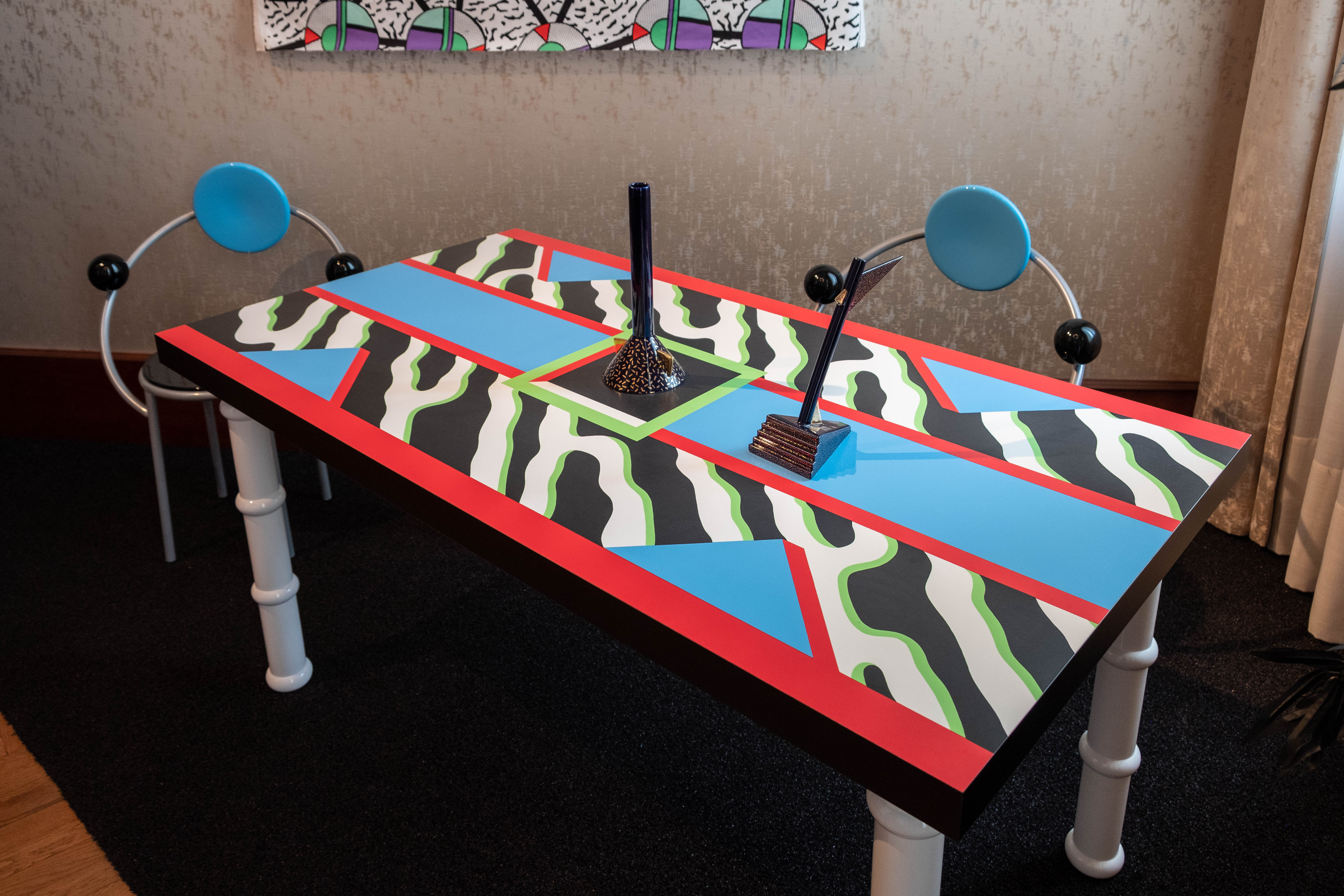
Natalie Du Pasquier's 1986 post-modern table

In Milan, she met the designer George Sowden and in 1981, she and Sowden were asked to become two of the founding members of the Memphis Group by designer and architect Ettore Sottsass. Du Pasquier, the youngest member of the Memphis Group, designed textiles and furniture items. The group was known for making work under the motto "form follows fun".

During her time in the Memphis group she and Sowden occasionally designed products for different companies. She designed textiles for Fiorucci and Esprit, and clocks for the Italian brand Lorenz. Along with Sowden, she made a collection called: "Objects for the Electronic Age", for which they designed laminate and other objects.

After the Memphis Group broke up, Du Pasquier shifted her focus to work on her solo career as a painter and sculptor.

=== Painting ===
In 1985, Du Pasquier started painting, and by 1987 it became her primary medium. She is represented by Pace Gallery internationally and Galerie Greta Meert in Brussels. Her work has been the subject of several survey exhibitions. In 2015, Nathalie Du Pasquier opened a solo exhibition in Berlin, Germany titled "Big Game". This exhibit included 35 years of her artwork, dating back from 1980. The Institute of Contemporary Art at the University of Pennsylvania opened an exhibit titled "Big Objects Not Always Silent" in 2016, containing years of abstract drawings, sculptures and figurative paintings. Du Pasquier was exhibited at the Palais de Tokyo in Paris, in the 2019 group exhibition "Future, Former, Fugitive".

=== Solo design work ===
Du Pasquier has continued to design textiles, including patterns for clothes produced by American Apparel since 2014 and blankets and other bedding, with her husband George Sowden, for Zig Zag Zurich in 2015.

Her recent exhibit in Modena, Italy, includes seven of Du Pasquier's sculptures. The site entitled "BRIC" was put on by ceramics brand Mutina's headquarters in October, 2019. The site displayed colored and textured bricks showing her duality of art and architecture. The exhibit purpose is to be interpreted by the viewer. The collection was such a success that MUT created brick material on sale similar to Du Pasquier's. The product Brac’ is available in five textures and can be used for the construct of walls. Later in Du Pasquier's career, she ventured into luxury design, designing silk scarves for Hermès and dresses for Valentino.

== Style of work ==
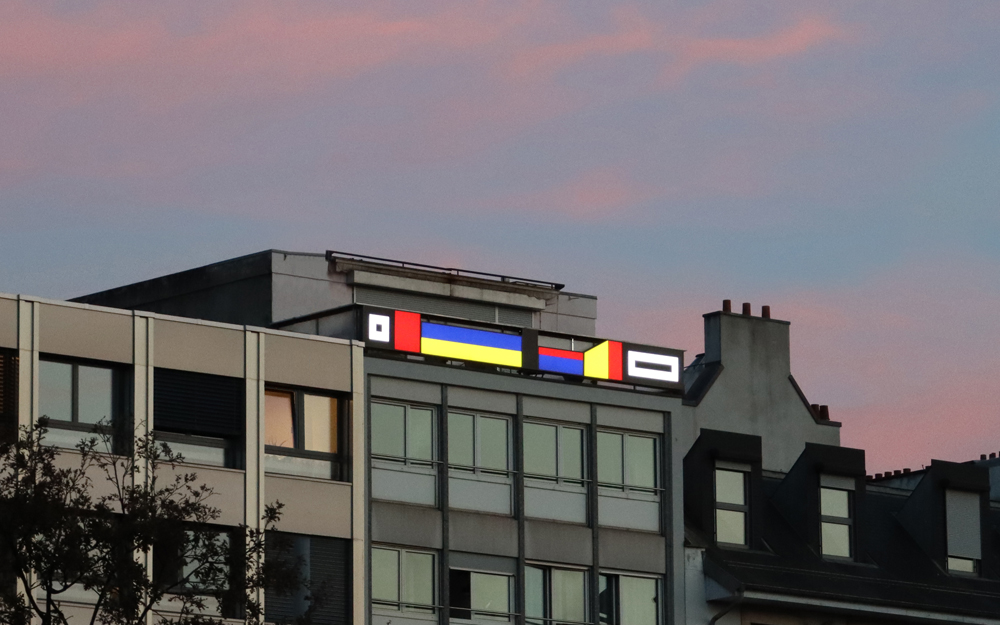
Nathalie du Pasquier sign is part of the Neon Parallax in Geneva

Over the past couple decades Du Pasquier became fascinated with the imaging of two and three dimensional objects. For a long period of time she created still life paintings by reciprocating everyday objects. Later she built wooden structures representing objects with a real life eye for dimension and symmetry. Du Pasquier's art work consists of bold shapes and colors. Her paintings and figures represents a twist on abstract art. She is not in favor of using high tech graphics in her art. Most of her works are subsequently completed with a pencil and paper. Du Pasquier says she strives to put "elements together that are interesting to paint." Du Pasquier described the relationship between her early work and later work as "a chain of thoughts that follow each other. It would be impossible not to connect the two, even if at a certain point I decided to become a painter."

== Works and publications ==
- 10 Tappeti Moderni = 10 Modern Carpets, 1986, with George Sowden
- Viaggio Tranquillo, 1993
- Nathalie du Pasquier, 2001, with Peter Cherry
- Nathalie du Pasquier: domino, 2002.
- Arranging Things: A Rhetoric of Object Placement (illustrator), 2003, with Leonard Koren
- Square Paintings, 2011
- 1/16 du Pasquier, 2011
- Achtung! Blumen!, 2012 with Steve Piccolo
- Milanese, 2015
- Nathalie du Pasquier: Don't Take These Drawings Seriously, 2015, with Omar Sosa
- How Many, 2022
- Sur Papier, 2025

== See also ==
- Memphis Group
