= Ronan & Erwan Bouroullec =

French designers

Ronan and Erwan Bouroullec (born 1971 and 1976) are French brothers who comprise a well known design duo. Their work spans a wide range from tables and chairs to tableware, rugs, textile walls, office furniture, ceramics, art objects and urban projects. Pieces by the Bouroullecs are in many private and museum collections.

== Early life and education ==
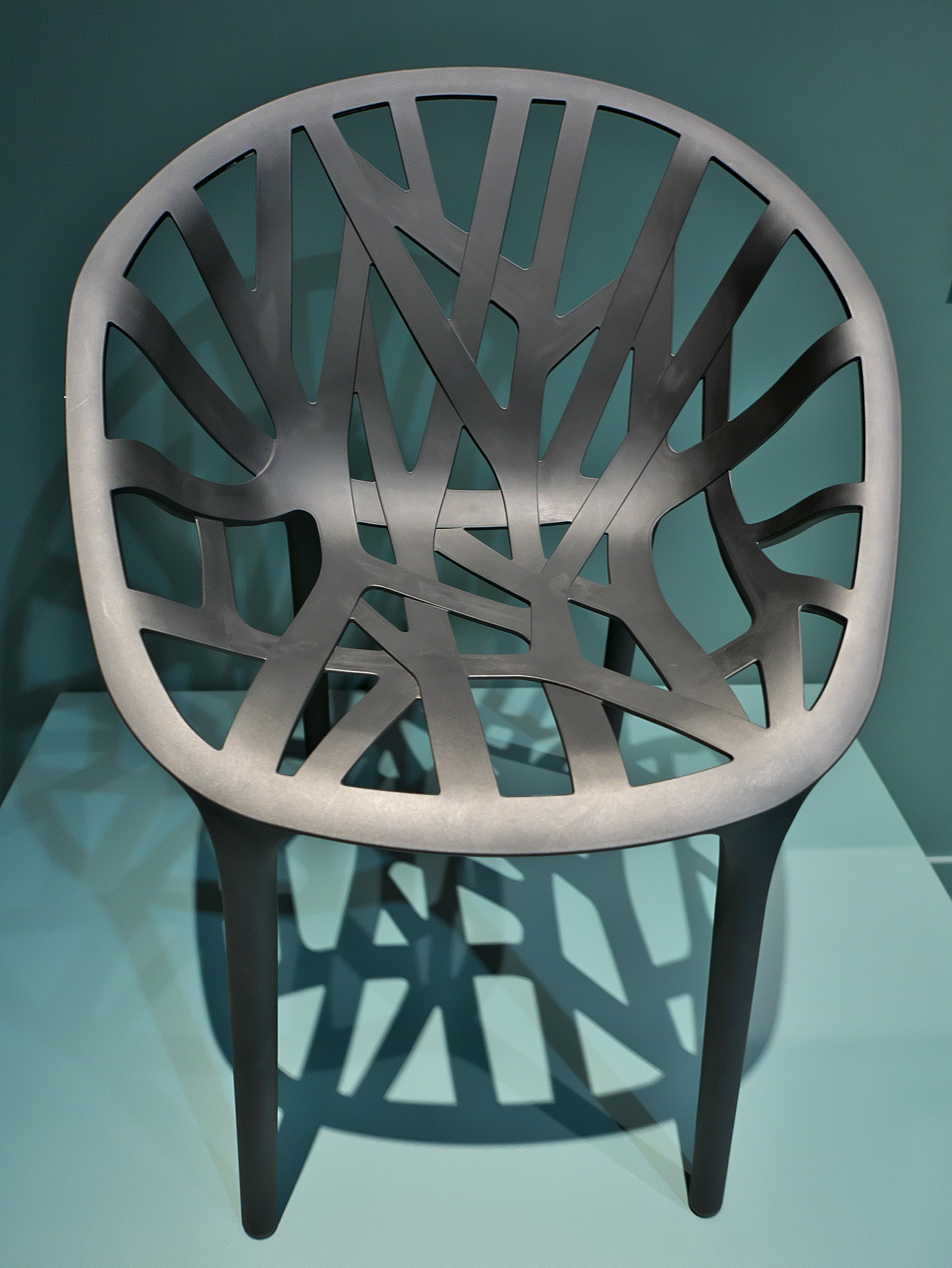
Vegetal chair designed for Vitra

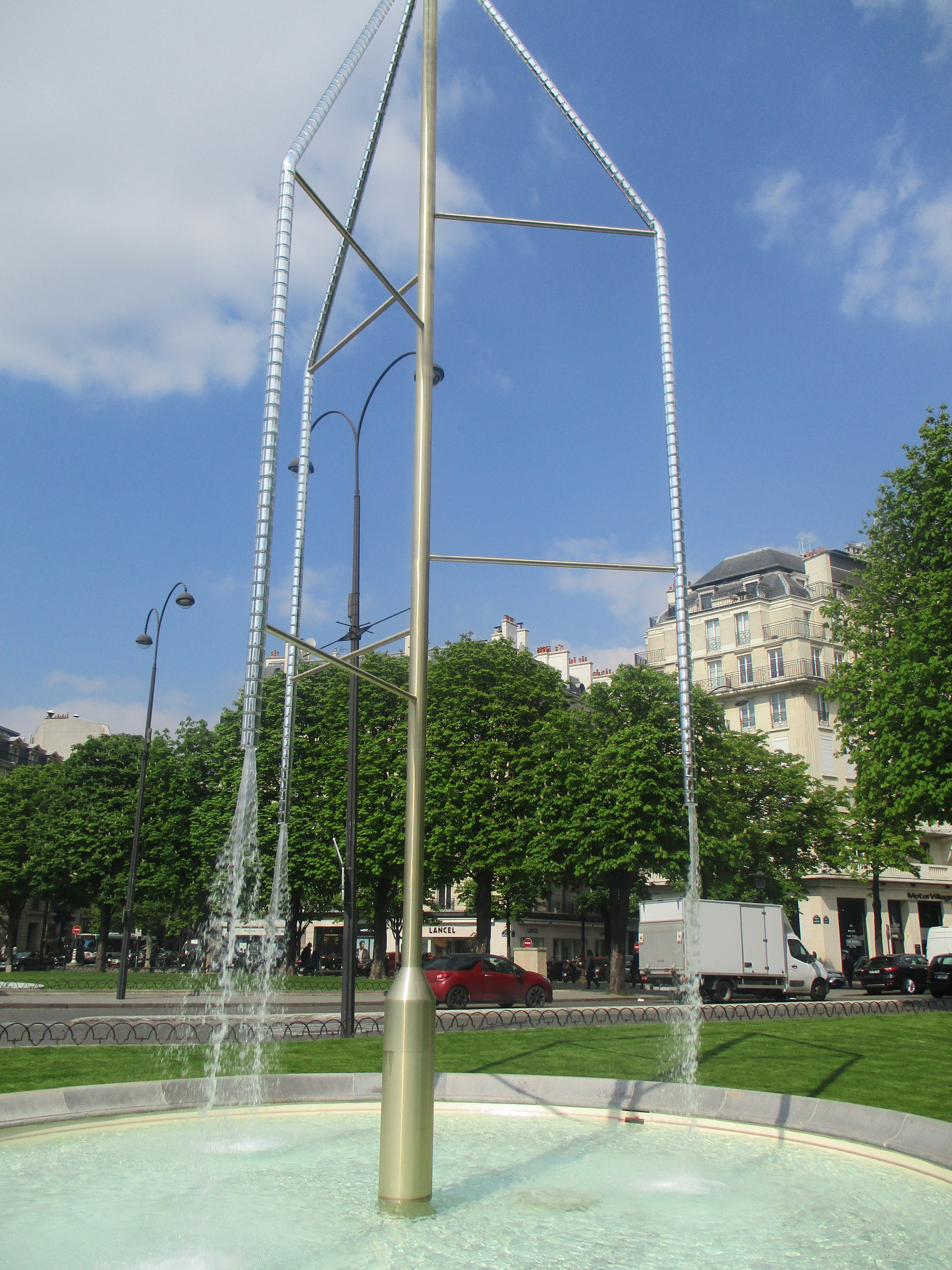
Fontaines du rond-point des Champs-Élysées-Marcel-Dassault (2019)

The Bouroullecs were born in Quimper, Brittany, where previous generations of their family had farmed. Ronan studied at the École nationale supérieure des arts décoratifs, subsequently assisted by his brother, Erwan, who graduated from École nationale supérieure d'arts de Paris-Cergy.

== Career ==
In 2007, the firm's "North Tiles" design for Kvadrat in Denmark won the D – Design Forum AID Award and has been included in Giulio Cappellini's design collection. Their work has included a tree house bedroom and a "table sprouting a bowl molded from a single piece of heat-welded Corian". The designs have been described as representing poetic practicality. "We don't want to make only functional pieces," Erwan Bouroullec noted.

The design team works from their company base in Paris, Atelier Bouroullec, for clients including Cappellini, Ligne Roset, Habitat, Domeau & Peres, Authentics, EandW, Magis, Vitra, HAY, and Gallery Kreo. They received the 1998 grand prix du jury international at the Maison et Objet furniture fair in Paris, the best new designer award in New York in 1999, a Compasso d'Oro nomination in 2001 in Milan, and designed the interior for Issey Miyake’s APOC shop in Paris.

In 2006, the Cneai invited them to design the "Floating House", an artist residence. In 2011, the Centre Pompidou-Metz hosts a major retrospective on the Bouroullec brothers. The show traveled to the United States and exhibited at the Museum of Contemporary Art in Chicago. Their work has been published in numerous books, and the brothers were interviewed in Gary Hustwit's 2009 documentary about industrial design called Objectified.

In 2014, the Bouroullecs were awarded the London Design Medal.

Apart from exclusive exhibitions, many of their lighting designs are permanently housed in museums across the globe, including the Musée National d’Art Moderne – Centre Pompidou and the Musée des Arts Décoratifs in Paris; Museum of Modern Art, New York; The Art Institute of Chicago: Design Museum, London; and the Museum Boijmans van Beuningen, Rotterdam.

He was profiled in the first issue of Revue Passager, January 2025, ISBN 978-2-959589-00-3.

=== Main achievements ===
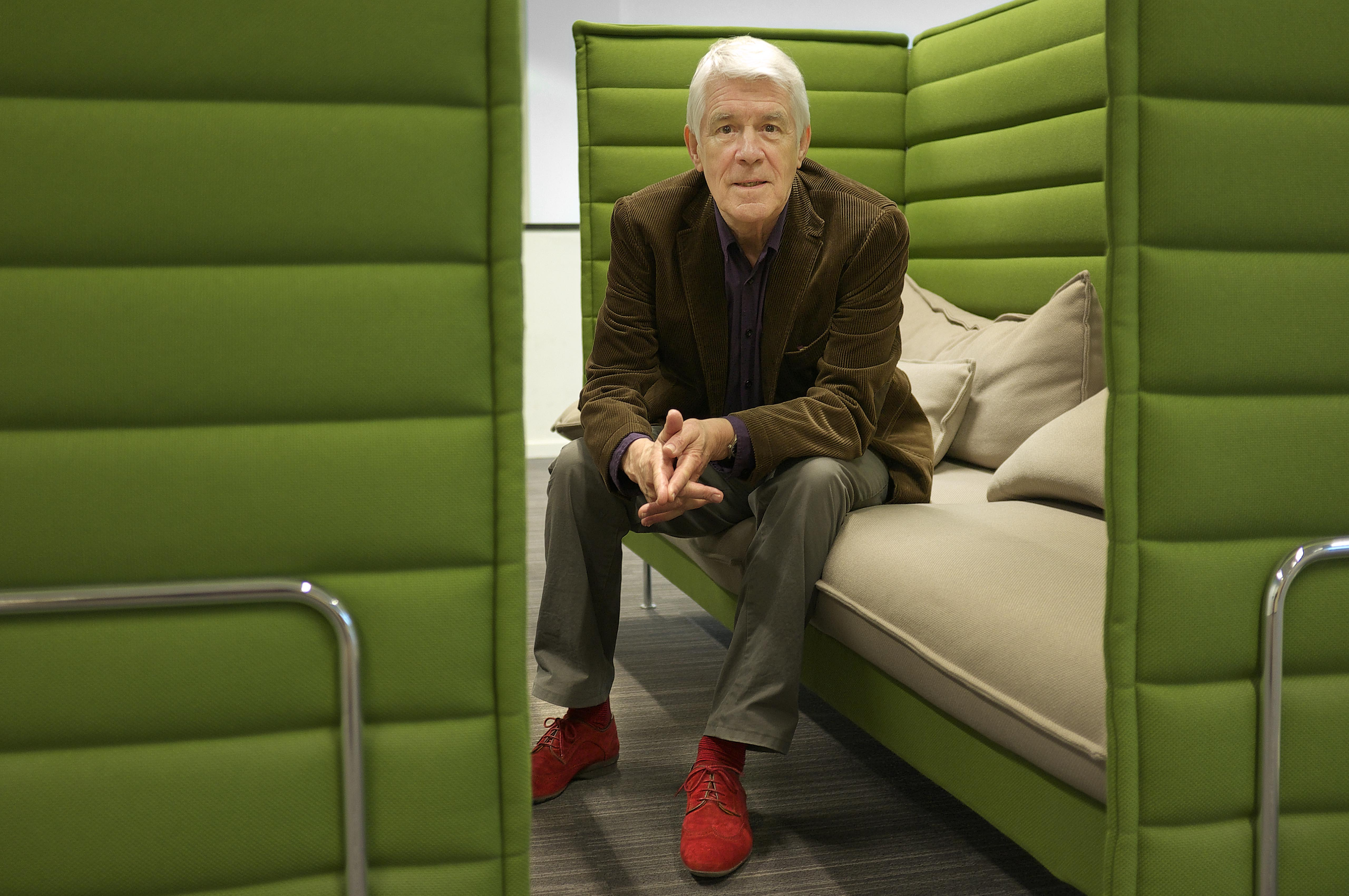
The Vitra Alcove Sofa by the Bouroullec brothers (pictured is Dutch comedian Kees van Kooten).

- Cuisine désintégrée, 1998, Cappellini
- Vases Combinatoires, 1998, Cappellini
- Lit Clos, 2000, Galerie Kreo
- Cloud, module, 2002, Cappellini
- Joyn, deskstop System, 2002, Vitra
- Module Algues, 2004, Vitra
- Maison flottante, 2006, houseboat artist's residence, Chatou
- Alcove, sofa, 2006, Vitra
- Slow Chair, 2007, Vitra
- Steelwood, system, 2007, Magis
- Vegetal, chair, 2009, Vitra
- Clouds, wall system, 2009, Kvadrat
- Lighthouse, lamp, 2010, Established & Sons
- Losange, carpet, 2011, Nanimarquina
- Pico, floor tiles, 2011, Mutina
- Aim, lamp, 2013, Flos
- Lustre Gabriel, permanent installation, Château de Versailles, 2013
- Officina, collection, 2015, Magis
- Palissade, collection, 2015, HAY
- Serif TV, television, 2015, Samsung
- Vases Nuage, 2015, Vitra
- Chaînes, lampe, 2016, Galerie Kreo
- Promenade Nuage, Paseo Ponti, Miami, 2018
- Elémentaire, chair, 2018, HAY
- Alcova, vases, 2018, WonderGlass
- Fontaines du rond-point des Champs-Élysées-Marcel-Dassault, 2019
- Truss, modular system of architectural furniture, 2022, Emeco
