= Suspension =

Suspension or suspended may refer to:

== Science, mathematics, and engineering ==
- Car suspension
- Cell suspension or suspension culture, in biology
- Guarded suspension, a software design pattern in concurrent programming suspending a method call and the calling thread until a precondition (guard) is satisfied
- Magnetic suspension, a method by which an object is suspended with no support other than magnetic fields
- Suspension (topology), in mathematics
- Suspension (dynamical systems), in mathematics
- Suspension of a ring, in mathematics
- Suspension (chemistry), small solid particles suspended in a liquid
  - Colloidal suspension
- Suspension (mechanics), system allowing a machine to move smoothly with reduced shock
- Suspensory behavior, arboreal locomotion of primates
- Suspend to disk, also known as hibernation, powering down a computer while retaining its state.
- The superstructure of a suspension bridge

== Temporary revocation of privileges ==
- Suspension (punishment), temporary exclusion as a punishment
  - Suspension from the UK parliament
  - Suspension (Catholic canonical penalty)
- Suspension of driving privileges ("suspended driver's license")
- Administrative License Suspension (ALS), US, driving license suspension without a court hearing

== Law ==
- Suspended sentence, sentence whose serving is deferred in favour of probation

== Entertainment ==
- Suspension (music), one or more notes temporarily held before resolving to a chord tone
- Suspension (2007 film), a film directed by Alec Joler and Ethan Shaftel
- Suspension (2015 film), a Canadian slasher film
- Suspended (film), 1987 Polish film
- Suspended (video game) (1983), an interactive fiction video game
- "Suspension", a song by Lights from Siberia, 2011

== Literature ==
- Suspension of disbelief, the intentional avoidance of critical thinking or logic in examining a work of fiction

== Eroticism ==
- Suspension bondage, the act of suspending a human body using suspension ropes, cables, or chains
- Suspension (body modification), the act of suspending a human body from hooks that have been put through body piercings

== See also ==
- Caffè sospeso (Italian for "suspended coffee")
- Lock (computer science)
- Suspend and resume (disambiguation)
- Suspension, a form of scribal abbreviation in medieval manuscripts
- Suspended animation
- Suspended meal
