= Coffee in Italy =

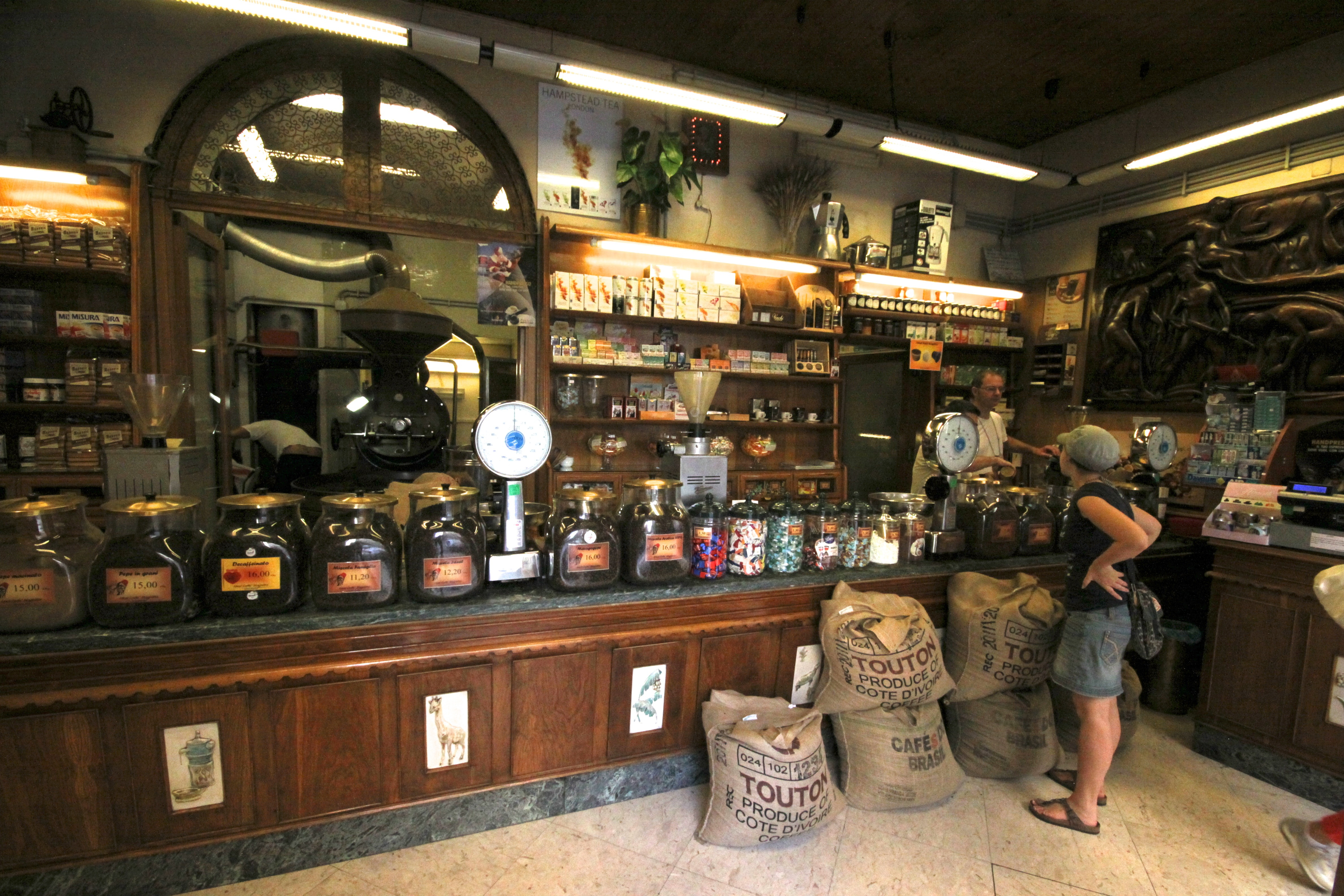
A Coffee roastery in Palermo

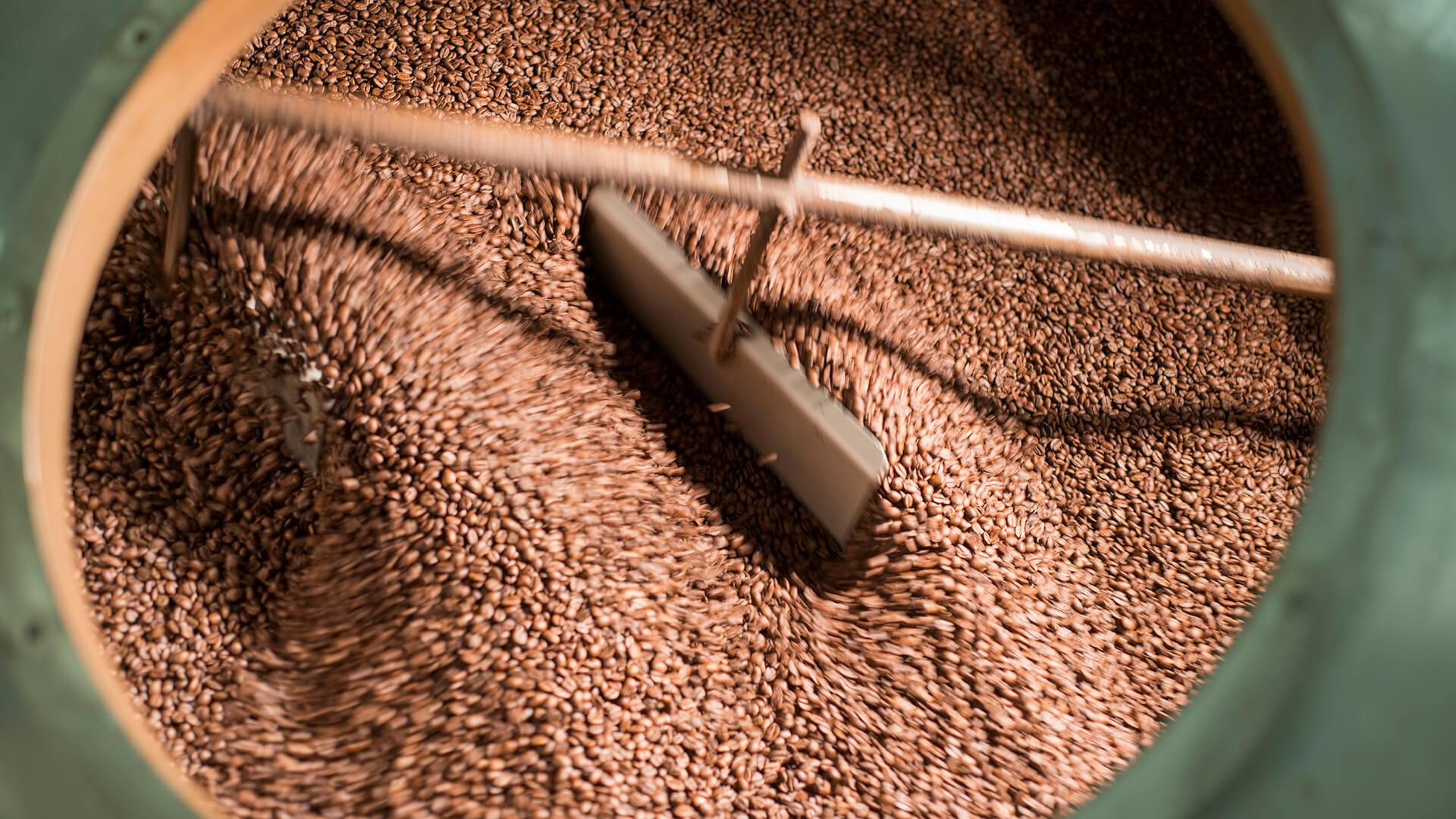
Caffè roasting in act

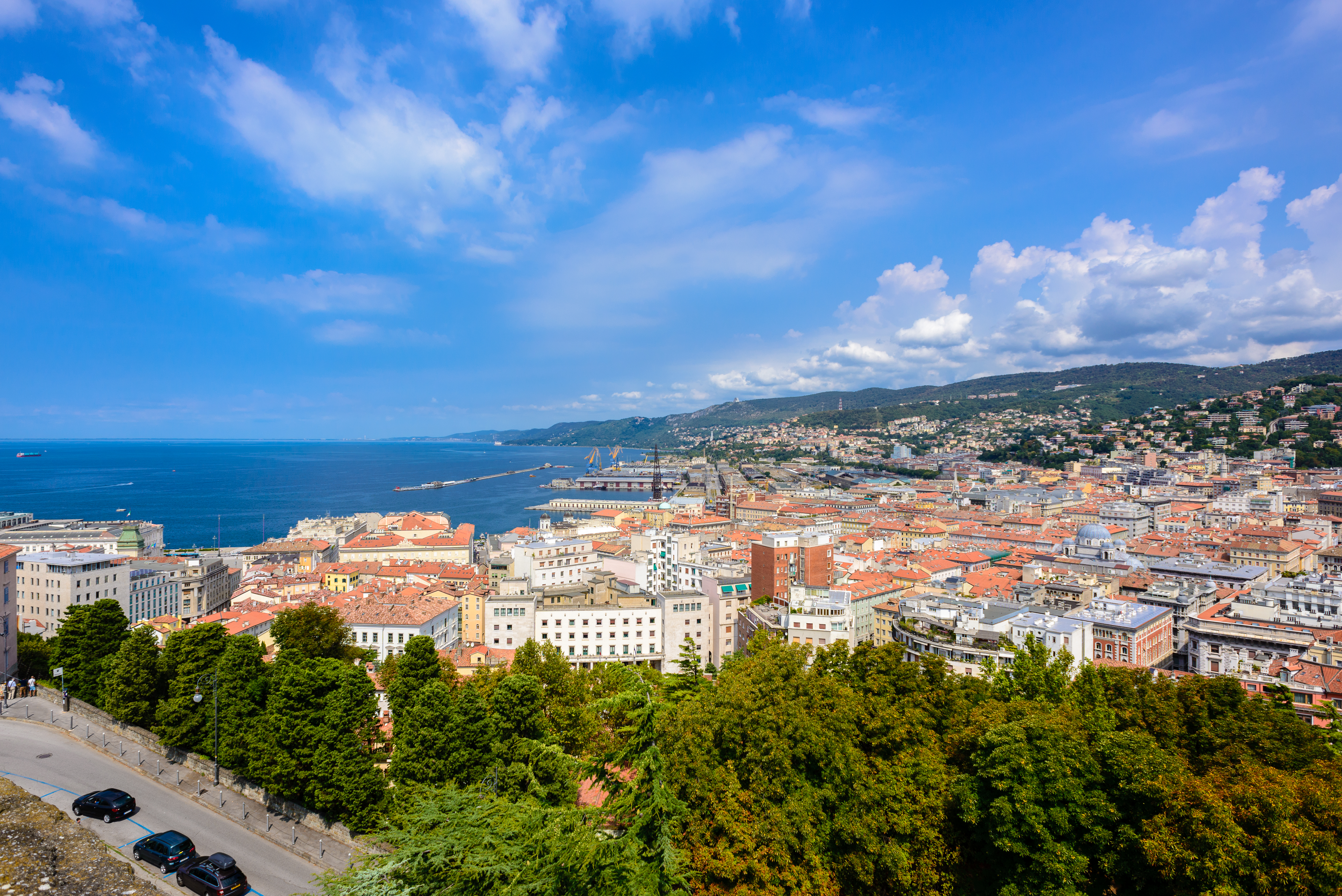
Trieste, the seat of many coffee companies

Coffee in Italy is an important part of Italian food culture. Italians are well known for their special attention to the preparation, the selection of the blends, and the use of accessories when creating many types of coffees. Many of the types of coffee preparation known today also have their roots here. The main coffee port in Italy is Trieste where there is also a lot of coffee processing industry. Italian coffee consumption, often espresso, is highest in the city of Naples. Naples is also the city with the strongest coffee tradition in Italy. In 2021, both Naples and Trieste expressed their intention to apply for the recognition of their coffee culture as UNESCO heritage. In Trieste, the consumption of coffee is 1,500 cups per person per year. That is about twice as much as is usually drunk in Italy.

Caffè (pronounced [kafˈfɛ]) is the Italian word for coffee and probably originates from Kaffa (Arabic: قهوة, romanized: Qahwa), the region in Ethiopia where coffee originated. The Muslims first used and distributed it worldwide from the port of Mokha in Yemen, after which the Europeans named it mokka. Caffè may refer to the Italian way of preparing a coffee, an espresso, or occasionally used as a synonym for the European coffee bar.

== History ==
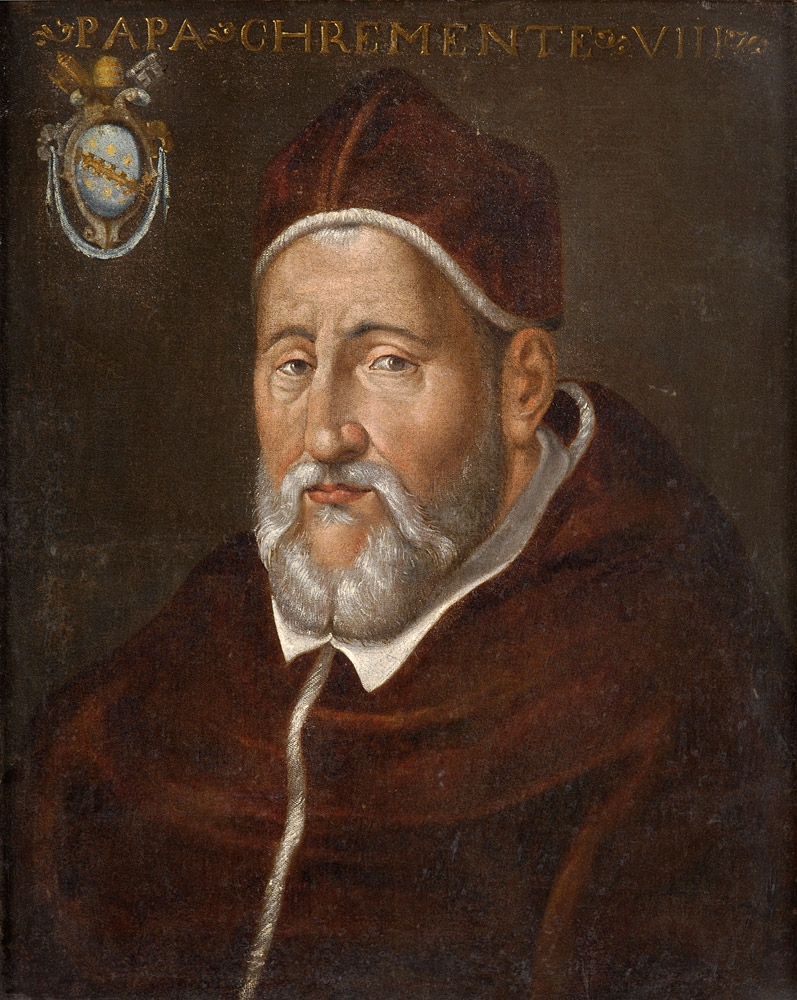
Pope Clement VIII, who popularised coffee in Europe among Christians

In Italy, as in most of Europe, coffee arrived in the second half of the 16th century through the commercial routes of the Mediterranean Sea. In 1580 the Venetian botanist and physician Prospero Alpini imported coffee into the Republic of Venice from Egypt, and soon coffee shops started opening one by one. Coffee spread and became the drink of intellectuals, of social gatherings, even of lovers, as plates of chocolate and coffee were considered a romantic gift. By the year 1763 Venice alone had more than 200 coffee shops, and the health benefits were celebrated. Some in the Catholic Church opposed coffee at first, believing it to be the "Devil's drink", but Pope Clement VIII, after trying it himself, gave it his blessing, boosting further its success and spread. He declared: "Why, this Satan's drink is so delicious that it would be a pity to let the infidels have exclusive use of it." Clement allegedly blessed the bean because it seemed better for people than alcoholic beverages. The year often cited is 1600. It is not clear whether this is a true story, but it may have been found amusing at the time.

In Turin, in 1933, Italian engineer Luigi di Ponti invented the first moka pot and subsequently sold the patent to Alfonso Bialetti. In 1946, Alfonso's son Renato started industrial production, selling millions of moka pots in one year, versus only 70,000 sold by his father in the previous ten, making the coffee maker (as well as coffee itself) an icon of Italy in the world. Coffee became established in Naples later. Some accounts associate its arrival with Mediterranean maritime trade through Sicily and Malta, while other traditions connect the early knowledge of the beverage in Naples with Pietro Della Valle, who wrote about kahve during his travels in the Middle East in the early 17th century.

The technological development that led to modern espresso was primarily in northern Italy. Angelo Moriondo of Turin patented a precursor to the espresso machine in 1884, while Milanese inventor Luigi Bezzera developed a machine for preparing individual servings of coffee at the beginning of the 20th century.

Some believe coffee arrived in Naples earlier, from Salerno and its Schola Medica Salernitana, where the plant came to be used as medicine in the 14th and 15th centuries. Coffee subsequently acquired considerable social and cultural importance in Naples. One preparation method strongly associated with the Neapolitan tradition uses the cuccumella. Despite its association with Naples, the coffee maker itself was of French origin, having been invented in Paris by Morize in 1819; its use later became a distinctive part of Neapolitan coffee culture. Neapolitan artisans came in touch with it when brought, again through the sea commercial routes, to the Port of Naples. One Neapolitan practice is the suspended coffee (the act of paying in advance for a coffee to be consumed by the next customer) originating there and defined by the Neapolitan philosopher and writer Luciano De Crescenzo as coffee "given by an individual to mankind".

== Caffè espresso ==
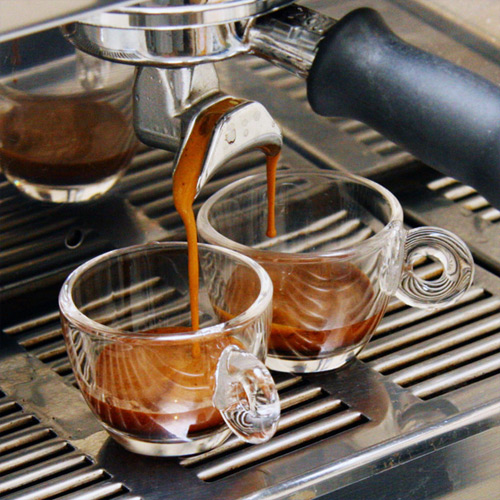
A cup of Italian coffee, the espresso

Normally, within the espresso bar environment, the term caffè denotes straight espresso. When one orders "un caffè" it is normally enjoyed at the bar, standing. The espresso is always served with a saucer and demitasse spoon, and sometimes with a complimentary wrapped chocolate and a small glass of water. The term espresso, substituting s for most x letters in Latin-root words, with the term deriving from the past participle of the Italian verb esprimere, itself derived from the Latin exprimere, means 'to express', and refers to the process by which hot water is forced under pressure through ground coffee.

== Caffettiera ==
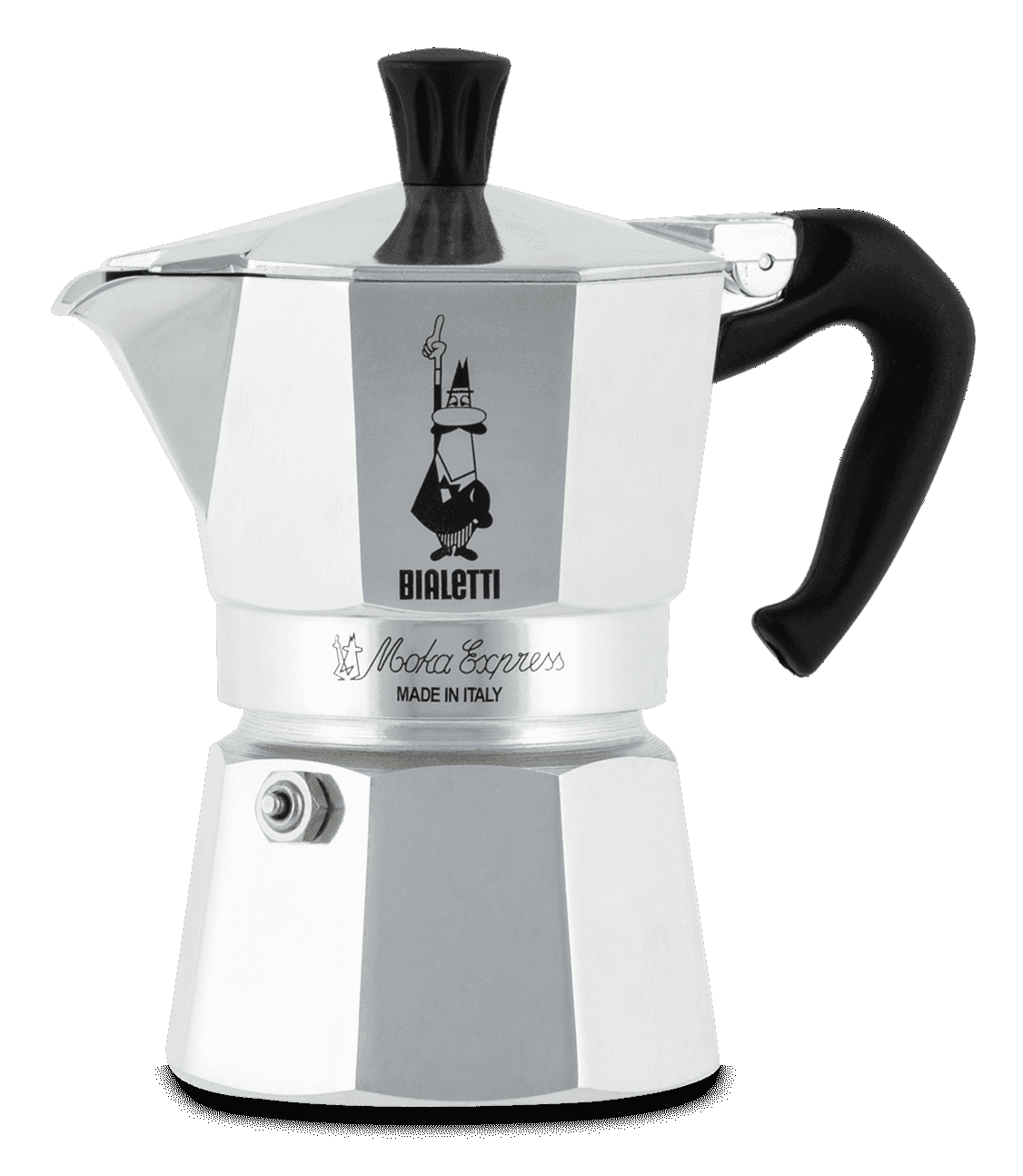
The Bialetti Moka Express, a type of moka pot

=== Coffee maker ===
The instrument used to prepare caffè at home, the caffettiera, is essentially a small steam machine made of a bottom boiler, a central filter which contains the coffee grounds, and an upper cup. In the traditional Moka pot, water is put in the boiler and the resulting boiling water passes through the coffee grounds, then reaches the cup. It was invented by Italian engineer Luigi Di Ponti in 1933 who sold the patent to Alfonso Bialetti, an aluminum vendor. It quickly became one of the staples of Italian culture. Bialetti Industries continues to produce the original model under the trade name "Moka Express". The Neapolitan caffettiera operates somewhat differently, and needs to be turned upside down when the drink is ready. Its boiler and cup are therefore interchangeable.

The quantity of coffee to be put in the filter determines the richness of the final beverage, but special care is needed in order not to block the water from crossing it, in case of an excess of grounds. Some hints prescribe that some small vertical holes are left in the powder by using a fork.

A small flame has to be used to provide an appropriate moderate water pressure; high pressure makes the water run too quickly, resulting in coffee with little flavour. The flame under the caffettiera has to be turned off ten seconds after the first characteristic noise is heard, and eventually lit again in case the cup was not filled.

=== Coffee house ===
A related but separate translation of the Italian caffetteria is coffee house or café: an establishment in which caffè was traditionally made with a moka pot. These places became common in the 19th century specifically for enjoying caffè, while the habit of caffè drinking at home started at the beginning of the 20th century, when caffettiera machines (Mokas) became available to the general public.

In the older caffetterie (Italian, plural), frequented by the upper classes, art and culture events were held. So, many caffetterie acquired cultural importance (like Caffè Greco at 84 Via Condotti, Rome; or Caffè Florian in Venice, both established after the mid of the 18th Century ) and became famous meeting points of artists, intellectuals, politicians, etc. This caffetterie culture was mainly enjoyed by men, while women organised their tea meetings.

Cappuccino is not related to traditional domestic coffee, being made with an espresso machine. Caffè-latte (also known as a latte in the U.S. and Café au lait in France) is made with a simple mixture of hot coffee and hot milk, and served in cups that are larger than tea cups. Caffetterie usually serve caffè-latte too.

=== Coffee house environments ===
Like bars, coffee houses have a long history of offering environments in which people can easily socialize amongst their own groups and (often) with strangers. This is reflected in language; when people say "meet for coffee," they primarily mean meet to socialize or talk. Historically, coffee houses have been places where people gather, chat, work, write (in particular, the writing of local newspapers), read (in particular, the same local newspapers that were written in coffee houses) and pass the time. Today, coffee houses are much the same—it's merely that ink and paper have been often replaced with laptops and newspapers have been replaced by blogs.

The layouts of coffee houses often include smaller nooks and larger, more communal areas. In a more crowded coffee house, it is common for strangers to sit at the same table, even if that table only seats two people. Coffee houses are typically cozy, which encourages communication amongst strangers.

=== Types of Italian coffee ===
The variety of coffee types in Italy is enormous and, while about 20 types of coffee are popular all over Italy, many regional varieties do exist.

Among the most popular Italian coffees are the standard espresso, the ristretto (a shorter espresso), the double espresso, caffè alla zucchero (espresso sweetened with sugar) the macchiato (espresso stained with milk), the marocchino (espresso, chocolate syrup, milk and cocoa), the cappuccino (espresso with whipped milk foam), the caffelatte (coffee and milk in similar quantities), the affogato (a ball of ice cream showered with espresso), the shakerato (a long espresso mixed with ice and strained), the caffè ginseng (black coffee mixed with extract of ginseng), the cappuccino matcha (cappuccino where matcha is used instead of coffee), the caffè d'orzo (barley coffee) and the caffè con panna (coffee with whipped cream).

== See also ==
=== Manufacturers of coffee ===
- Caffè Pascucci
- Guglielmo coffee
- illy
- Lavazza
- Massimo Zanetti Beverage Group

=== Espresso machine ===
- Bezzera
- Bialetti
- Cimbali
- De'Longhi
- Elektra (espresso machines)
- Faema
- FrancisFrancis
- Gaggia
- La Marzocco
- La Pavoni
- Rancilio
- Saeco
