= Indian filter coffee =

Drink made with coffee and milk

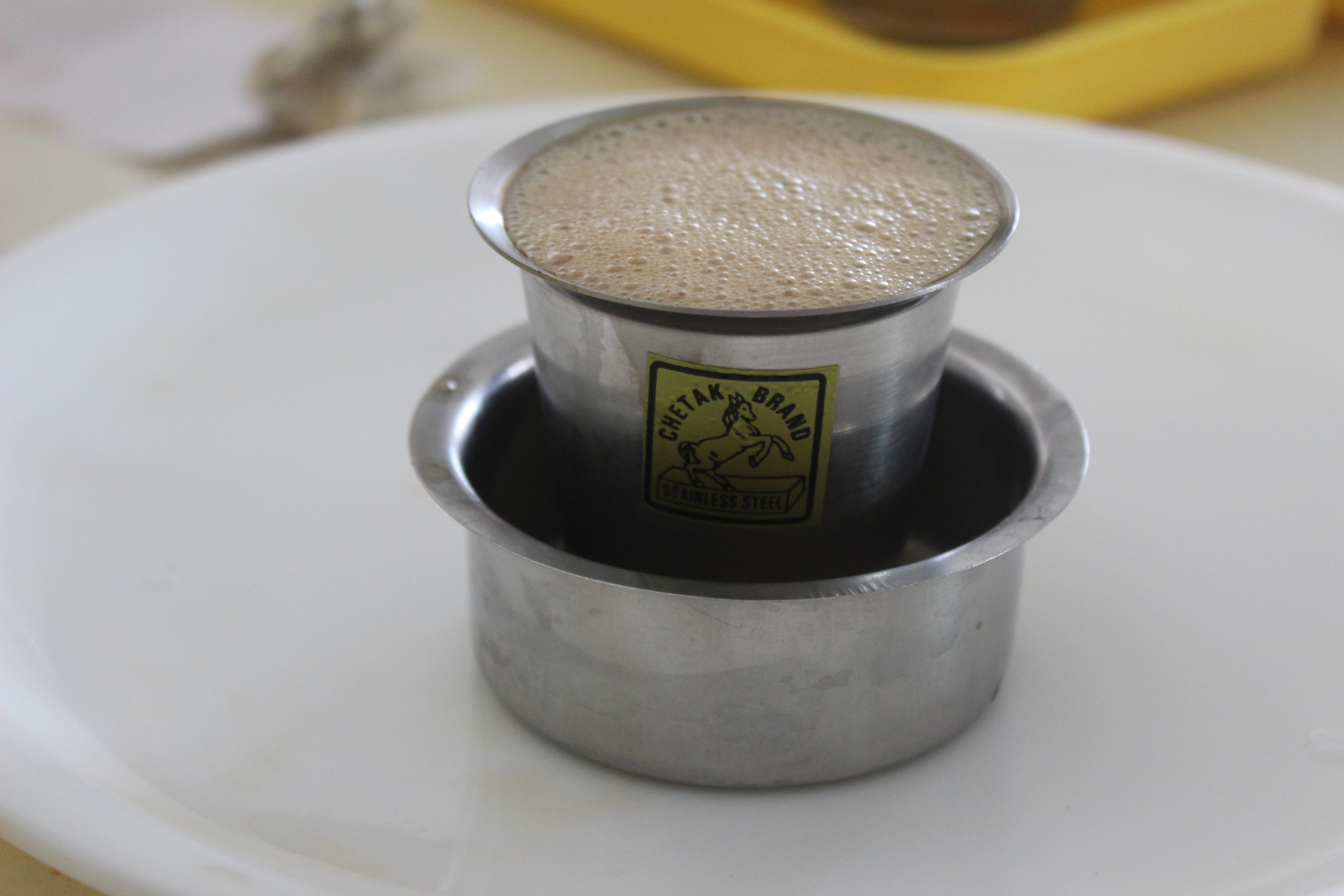
- Filter kaapi served in a metal tumbler, inside the dabarah saucer in which it can be cooled

Indian filter coffee is a coffee drink made by mixing hot milk and sugar with the infusion obtained by percolation brewing of finely ground coffee powder with chicory in a traditional Indian filter. It has been described as "hot, strong, sweet and topped with bubbly froth" and is known as filter kaapi in India.

== History ==
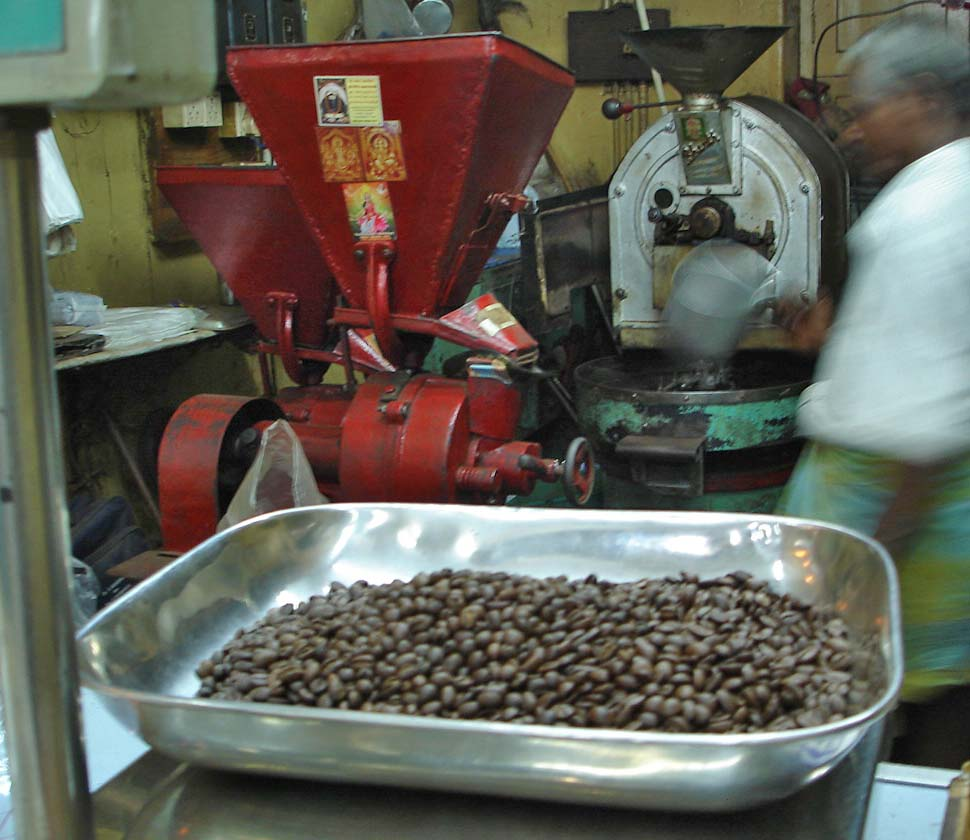
Coffee grinding in a filter coffee shop in Chennai

The consumption of coffee was recorded in the art and accounts of the Mughal court, from the early 1600s, with travellers offering accounts of the qahwakhanas (coffeehouses) of Shahjahanabad (Old Delhi).

Until the 17th century, efforts were made to establish and maintain an Arabian coffee monopoly, with cultivation limited to Ethiopia, Tanzania, and Yemen, and exports limited to roasted or baked coffee beans, to protect the Arabian merchants. According to a legend, Indian Sufi Baba Budan discovered coffee on a pilgrimage to Mecca, and smuggled seven raw coffee beans back to India and planted them in the hills of Chikmagalur in present-day Karnataka. The favourable conditions enabled the coffee plants to thrive in the hills, which were later named Baba Budangiri ('Baba Budan Hills').

In the mid to late 1600s, the Dutch East India Company (1605-1825) were the first to recognise the commercial opportunities of exporting Indian grown coffee, but later concentrated their efforts in Java. They also noted its popularity among the locals, a Dutch chaplain, Rev Jacob Vissche, of Cochin, wrote in the 1720s: "The coffee shrub is planted in the gardens for pleasure and yields plenty of fruit which attains a proper degree of ripeness. But it has not the refined taste of the Mocha coffee ...".

In the late 1700s, the British East India Company became interested in the coffee, and established their own plantations in Coorg (present-day Kodagu).

== Ingredients ==
Traditionally, Indian filter coffee is made with Plantation A washed arabica or Peaberry coffee beans. The beans are dark roasted, ground, and blended with chicory, with the coffee constituting 80-90% and the chicory 10-20% of the mixture. The chicory's slight bitterness contributes to the flavor of Indian filter coffee.

Traditionally, jaggery or honey were used as sweeteners, but white sugar has been used since the mid-1900s.

== Preparation ==
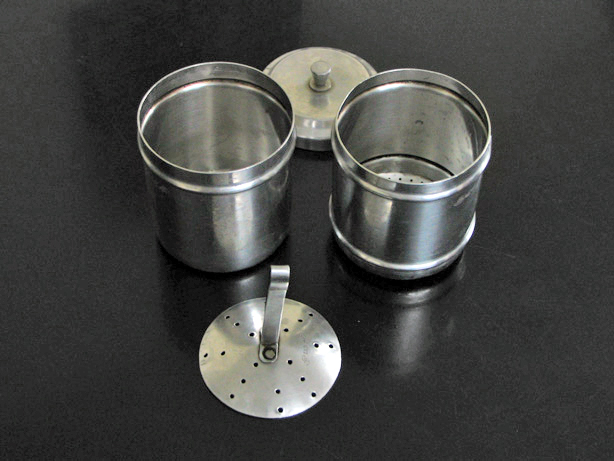
Metal South Indian coffee filter disassembled

Indian filter coffee is prepared by first bringing water to a boil. A cylindrical, stainless steel filter is used in the preparation of the drip coffee. The filter has two metal cups that assemble one over the other. The filter coffee powder is first added to the upper cup on top of the perforated chamber and then compressed with a pressing disc. The boiled water is then poured over the disc and filter. The upper cup is then secured with the lid, and the coffee is allowed to brew. This process allows the water to extract more flavor from the coffee, resulting in a more robust and stronger flavor compared to Western drip coffee.

Once the collector containing the brew is detached, the brew can be combined with hot milk. Sugar may also be added to the filter coffee.

It is traditionally served in a stainless steel tumbler with coffee poured back and forth between the two vessels to cool it and create froth.

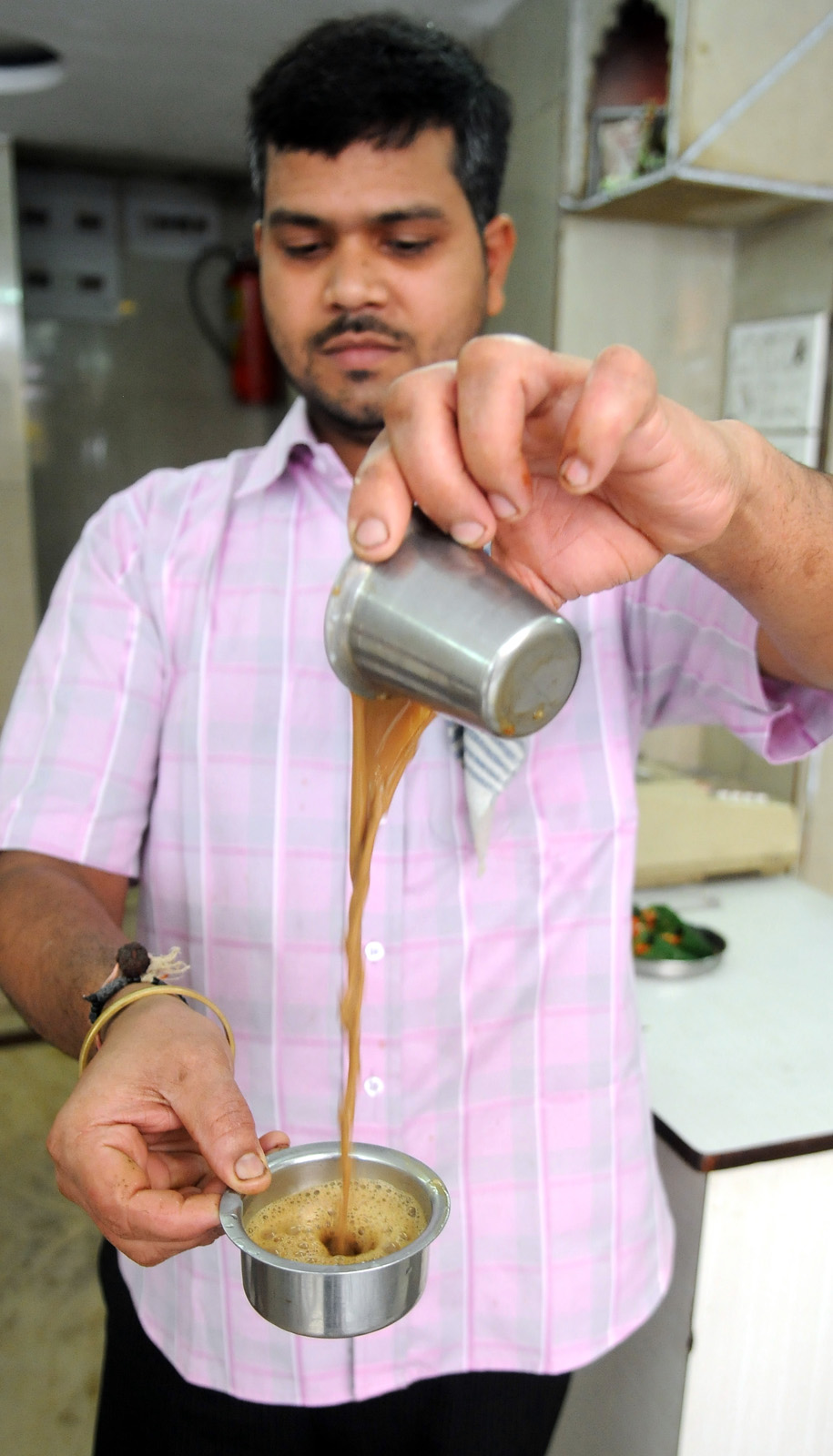
Indian filter coffee being prepared for serving

== See also ==
- List of coffee beverages
- List of Indian drinks
- Coffeemaker
- Drip coffee
- Coffee percolator
- Neapolitan flip coffee pot
- Coffee filter
- French press
- Moka pot
- Vietnamese iced coffee
