= Bialetti (disambiguation) =

Bialetti may refer to:

- Alfonso Bialetti (1888-1970), Italian engineer and entrepreneur
- Bialetti, Italian manufacturer company founded by Alfonso Bialetti
- Bialetti Moka Express, a product manufactured by the Bialetti Industries
- Bialetti Montecatini, a professional basketball team based in Montecatini Terme, Tuscany, Italy
