= Suspend and resume =

Suspend and resume may refer to:

- Coroutines, computer program components that generalize subroutines for cooperative multitasking, by allowing execution to be suspended and resumed
- Hibernation (computing) or Suspend to disk, powering down a computer while retaining its state by saving the contents of its random access memory to a hard disk or other non-volatile storage so that it can be restored when the computer is turned on
- Sleep mode or Suspend to RAM, a low power mode for electronic devices such as computers, televisions, and remote controlled devices
- Suspended game, in baseball, when a game has to be stopped before it can be completed, and the game is meant to be finished at a later time or date

== See also ==
- Interrupt
- Resumption (disambiguation)
- Saved game
- Standby (disambiguation)
- Suspension (disambiguation)
