= Nicola Gomirato =

Italian composer

Nicola Gomirato (born in Venice in 1963) is an Italian artist involved in music, history and literature. He is an eclectic musician that writes, creates, and performs musical shows combining words, music, history, instruments and poetry.

== Musical shows ==
- 2009 HGTMusic
- 2008 Itaca
- 2007 AsperMusic
- 2006 MilkMusic
- 2005 HornGlobetrotter

== Biography ==
Nicola Gomirato was born in Venice, Italy, in 1963. At an early age, he demonstrated a natural musical talent and at the age of nine, he began taking private piano lessons.

In the first year of studying piano, he reached such a high level of technique that he was able to enroll in the local music school. Additionally, he attended junior secondary school courses within the Conservatoire, as well as complementary courses about instruments, theory and solfeggio, harmony, history of music, literature and science.

Nicola's teachers consistently noted his excellent musical skills and suggested he not only work as an instrument player, but as a conductor. With his sights set on this new option, he decided to expand his knowledge of orchestral instruments and began taking French horn and violin lessons.

Well before Nicola finished his academic studies, he started working both as a concert player and teacher. He performed several concerts in Venice and the surrounding area, and taught children at the Rudolf Steiner School in the primary and junior levels.

As a horn player, a collaboration with Teatro La Fenice start on performing a series of concerts, including the cycle of Mahler’s symphonies. In the same period, he substituted for his own French horn teacher and taught beginner classes.

In 1983, he was awarded his French horn diploma, and began his career as a music education teacher in state schools and as an instrument teacher in private schools. At the same time, he continued performing concerts and taking part in a variety or orchestras and chamber music groups in major Italian and European cities.

Since then, Nicola has collaborated with youth orchestras as a horn-player and conductor, composed pieces specifically aimed at young musicians and formulated new teaching methods.

He worked as a teacher and director at the Music Academy of Treviso in Italy, taught primary and junior levels at the Leonardo da Vinci Institute in Switzerland and played horn in chamber music groups in Switzerland and Milan.

In 2000, he began work in music theatre, and began writing music for fairy tales.

In 2005, he formed a new orchestra called Orchestra Rondinella, and worked with the Royal Oman Symphony Orchestra in Muscate.

In 2012 he starts the activity as publisher with Racconti di Tarbonia!, an imaginary world for kids translated in musical fairy tales

== Compositions ==
Some of his compositions are registered at the National Library in Florence.

=== Educational compositions ===
- Easy duets for violin, cello, piano, flute.
- Kits for guitar, clarinet and trumpet.
- Sonatinas for piano, violin, cello, trumpet, oboe, flute, clarinet, bassoon, horn.
- Easy concertos for piano, French horn, bassoon, oboe and flute and orchestra
- Instrumental music for children's orchestra

=== Educational compositions for choirs ===
- Six solo voice pieces for treble voice choir.
- Four pieces for two voices, for treble voice choir.
- Let's sing in chorus – choral compositions for mixed four-part choir.
- “In the land of Music” for treble voices and children's orchestra.

=== Compositions for various instruments ===
- 21 piano preludes.
- Two nocturnes for French horn and orchestra.

Quartets for 4 horns. Short concerto for Timpani and orchestra Short concerto for flute, violin and orchestra “Images” for horn and harp

=== Miscellaneous compositions ===
Musical fairy tales for narrator and small orchestral group

== Cafehorn ==
The cafehorn, is a unique musical instrument, was invented by Nicola Gomirato and crafted in Italy.

The idea came from the Italian custom of preparing coffee with a caffettiera (a coffee percolator) it is a type of pot used to brew coffee.

Cafehorn is made of six caffettiere, with the same shape but with different size, connected with brass tubes and a bell, has 3 rotary valves.

The cafehorn produces a particular and coloured sound similar to French horn sound.

In 2006, Nicola Gomirato received a patent for it.

== Lessons and Teacher ==
As musical teacher Nicola Gomirato taught for several years teaching history of music, composition, piano, guitar, and French horn as well as brass ensemble. Nowadays he decided to devote himself to a worldwide teaching experience. Using his knowledge, his music, his love for teaching and the technology.

== Children's Literature ==
As writer, Nicola Gomirato wrote more than 1400 short stories for children, now published under "Racconti di Tarbonia" logo. See Martino.ovh
