= Resumption =

Resumption may refer to:

- Eminent domain
- The Specie Payment Resumption Act of 1875
- Resumptive pronoun
