= Alfonso Bialetti =

Italian engineer (1888-1970)

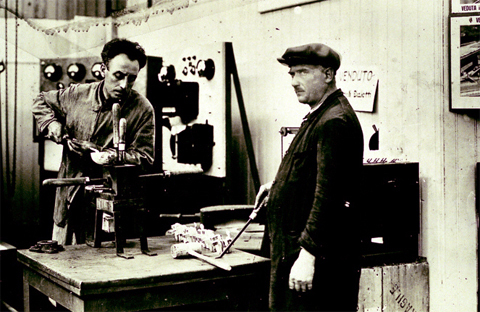

Alfonso Bialetti (Italian pronunciation: [alˈfɔnso bjaˈletti]) (17 June 1888– 5 March 1970) was an Italian engineer who became famous for manufacturing the Triplerapid Miracol 900 which he modified and sold as Moka Express coffeemaker in the 1950s. Designed in 1937 by Otello Amleto Spadini, the coffee pot has been a style icon since the 1950s. While many variations of the Moka have been developed, including the Bialetti cow-printed Mukka Express (which makes cappuccino), the original is considered a classic. Bialetti was also the founder of Bialetti Industries, now an Italian kitchen-ware company. The Bialetti brand is now owned by Bradshaw International, which manufactures and sells Bialetti brand kitchen-ware.

== The Bialetti Company ==
The Bialetti mascot with his index finger held up as if ordering another espresso. In Italian he is called l’omino coi baffi – "the mustachioed little man". The mascot is a caricature of Alfonso's son, Renato Bialetti, by Illustrator Paolo "Paul" Campani.

Bialetti first acquired his metal-working skills by working for a decade in the French aluminium industry. By 1919 he had established his own metal and machine workshop in Crusinallo (his native Piedmont) to make aluminium products: this was the foundation of the Bialetti company. He transformed his workshop – Alfonso Bialetti & C. Fonderia in Conchiglia – into a studio for design and production.

== The Moka Express ==
=== Design ===
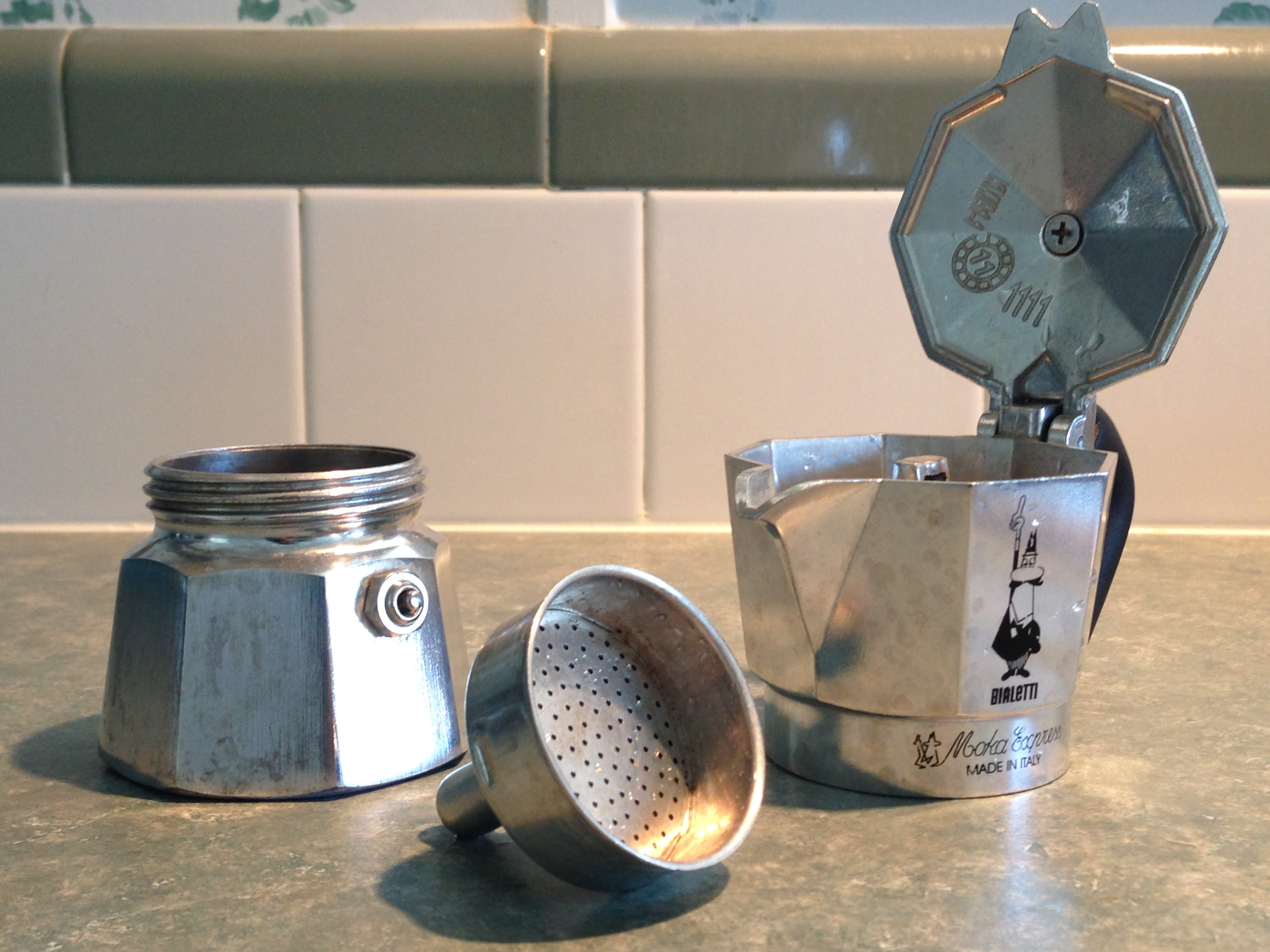
Main components of a Bialetti Moka Express pot

Bialetti completed his design for the aluminium Moka Express in 1950. It may also be referred to as a Moka, Moka pot, a Bialetti, a percolator or a stove-top coffeemaker, and in Italian as la Moka, la macchinetta ("the little machine") or la caffettiera. The blueprints for the Moka Express are on display in the London Design Museum. Bialetti was probably heavily influenced by contemporary designers such as Hoffmann, Puiforcat, Genazzi and Henin; to a certain extent he copied and built upon their coffee-pot designs. The coffee pot's clean classic design with its symmetrical eight-faceted metallic body is easily recognisable—it is still manufactured today by Bialetti. Since its creation the Moka has become the world's most famous coffee pot and has been cited in the Guinness Book of World Records as well as in various essential design books.

The use of aluminium to construct the body of the coffee pot was also a relatively new industrial concept as aluminium was not a traditional "domestic metal". Soon the material was to become more common in kitchens and the mid-1930s are considered to be the golden era in the production of aluminium products for the kitchen. The Bialetti design coupled with the use of the novel metal made the Moka pot stand out.

=== Development and marketing ===
The Moka transformed the Bialetti company into a leading coffee-machine designer and manufacturer. Between 1934 and 1940 the Moka was only marketed locally – sold by Alfonso at the weekly markets in Piedmont. In those six years he produced 70,000 units. By 2001 a total of 220 million had been produced and it later passed 330 million. During World War II the rising prices of coffee and aluminium stalled production of the Bialetti products. It was not until Renato, Alfonso's son, took over in 1946 that the Bialetti product line was narrowed down to a single product: the Moka Express. A huge multi-faceted marketing campaign was initiated by Renato. It incorporated television, billboards which saturated the streets of Milan and even the creation of a giant statue of the Moka Express coffee pot. Copy-cat designs were infiltrating the market by now and advertising turned out to be a key strategy in defining the success of the Moka and ensuring the popularity of the Bialetti brand. L'omino coi baffi – the Moka mascot – was based on a humorous cartoon doodle of Alfonso Bialetti's son Renato. The initial sketches and logo were created in 1953 by Paul Campani. By 1956 the Bialetti company had managed to construct a state-of-the-art factory in Omegna.

=== Social impact ===
Espresso machines prior to the Moka Express were large, expensive, and technically complicated. Few people kept them at home, so coffee-drinking was largely a public affair. The Moka Express, which was comparatively small, cheap, and easy to use, made it feasible for many more people to brew espresso at home. Over the rest of the 20th century, it gradually displaced other home coffee makers invented in the late 19th century, such as the Napoletana and the Milanese.

== Personal life ==
Alfonso Bialetti is the grandfather of Alberto Alessi of Alessi, the Italian design house.
