= Coffee percolator =

Coffee brewing device

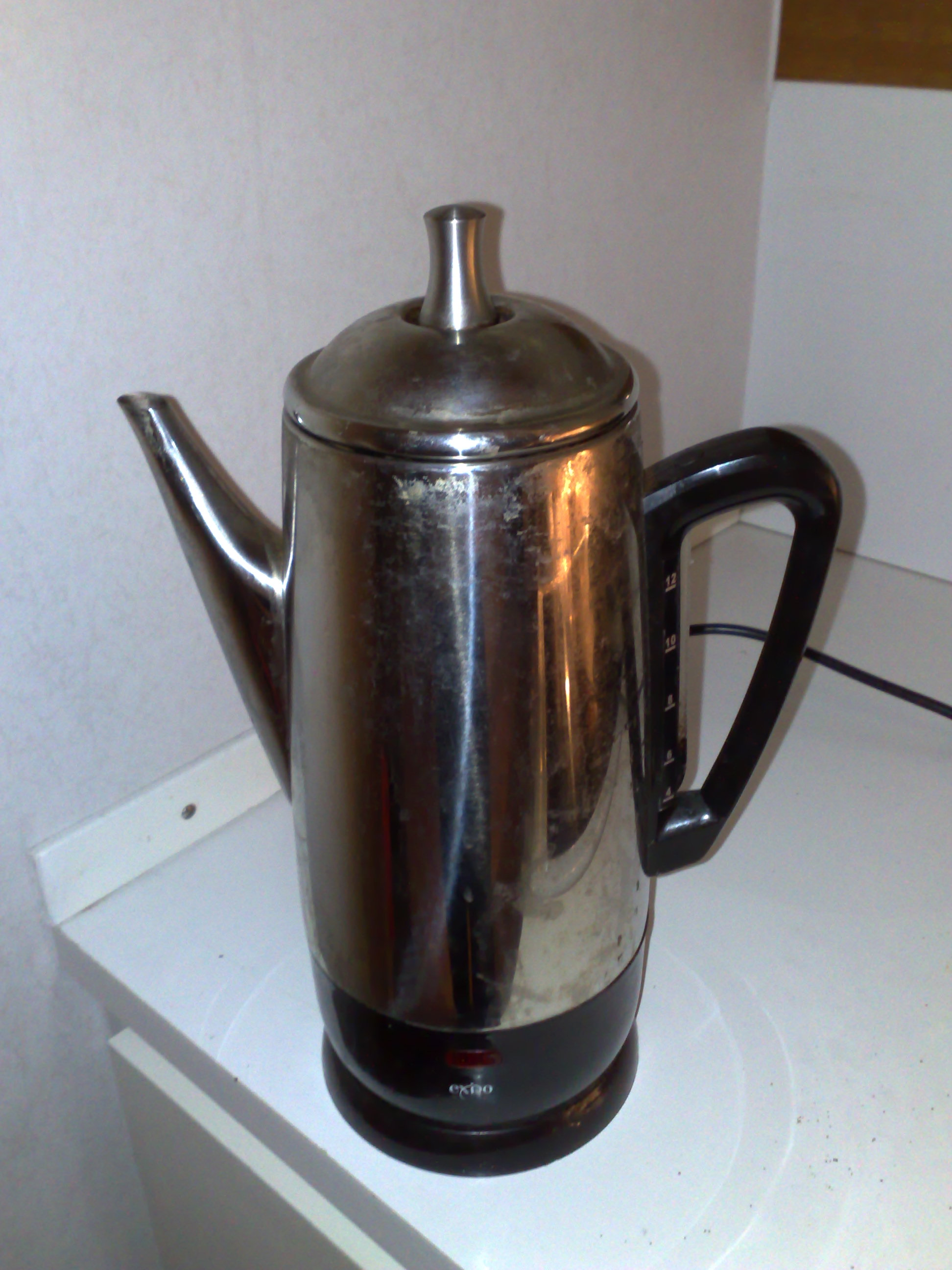
Electric percolator

A coffee percolator is a type of pot used for the brewing of coffee by continually cycling the boiling or nearly boiling brew through the grounds using gravity until the required strength is reached. The grounds are held in a perforated metal filter basket.

Coffee percolators once enjoyed great popularity, but were supplanted in the early 1970s by automatic drip-brew coffeemakers. Percolators often expose the grounds to higher temperatures than other brewing methods, and may recirculate already brewed coffee through the beans. As a result, coffee brewed with a percolator is particularly susceptible to overextraction. However, percolator enthusiasts maintain that the potential pitfalls of this brewing method can be eliminated by careful control of the brewing procedures.

== Brewing process ==
Cross-section of a coffee percolator

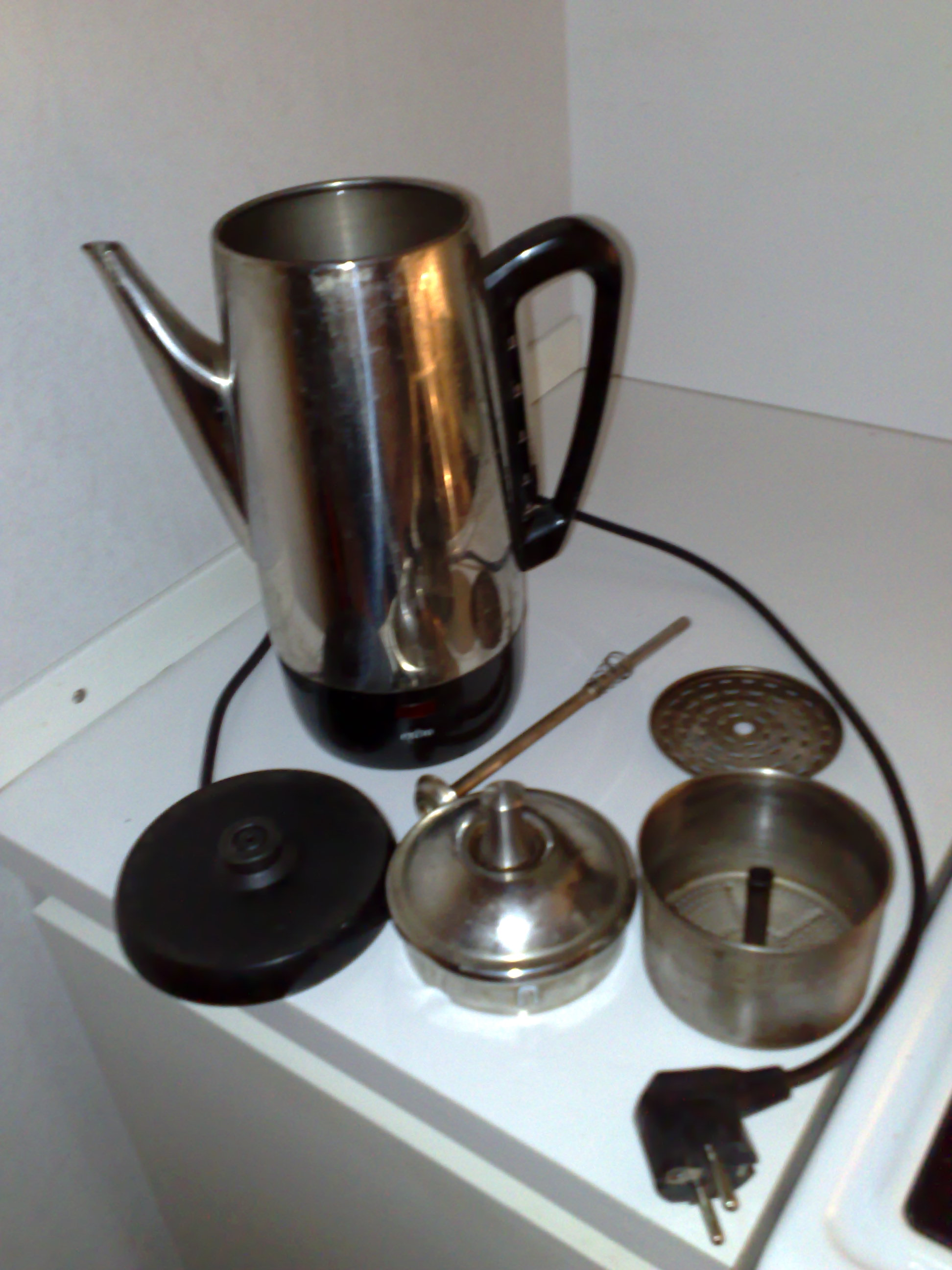
A disassembled electric coffee percolator

A coffee percolator consists of a pot with a chamber at the bottom which is nearest to the heat source. A removable vertical tube leads from there to the top of the percolator. Just below the upper end of this tube is a perforated metal filter "basket" to hold the grounds to be brewed.

Water is poured into the pot, keeping the level below the bottom of the basket, and the desired amount of a fairly coarse-ground coffee is placed in the basket.

The percolator is placed on a range or stove, heating the water in the bottom chamber. Water at the very bottom of the chamber gets hot first and starts to boil. The boiling creates bubbles of steam that are directed up the vertical tube, pushing hot water along with it up and out the top of the tube in a process similar to the principle behind a gas lift pump. The hot water hits the underside of the lid, and flows out and over the inner lid of the coffee basket. Perforations in the inner lid distribute the water over the top of the coffee grounds in the basket. From there the freshly brewed coffee drips into the gradually warming water below. This whole cycle repeats continuously, making the characteristic intermittent "perking" sound of the hot water hitting the underside of the lid.

As the brewing coffee nears the boiling point, the "perking" sound becomes a continuous gurgle, signaling that the coffee is ready to drink. In a manual percolator the pot is removed from the stove or the heat reduced to stop the percolation. Brewed coffee left continuously percolating at the boiling point will over extract, making the resulting coffee harsh and excessively bitter.

Some coffee percolators have an integral electric heating element and are not used on a stove. Most of these automatically reduce the heat at the end of the brewing phase, keeping the coffee at drinking temperature but not boiling.

== Usage ==
Large percolators, called coffee urns, are often found in use at offices, cafeterias, community events, church gatherings and other large group activities where large quantities of coffee are needed at one time.

Percolators are also popular among campers and other nature enthusiasts because of their ability to make coffee without electricity, although a simple filter holder can also be used with boiled water poured from a pot. Non-pressure percolators may also be used with paper filters.

== History ==
=== Invention ===
The first modern percolator incorporating the rising of boiling water through a tube to form a continuous cycle and capable of being heated on a kitchen stove was invented in 1819 by the Parisian tinsmith Joseph-Henry-Marie Laurens. Its principle was then often copied and modified.

The first US patent for a coffee percolator was issued to James Nason of Franklin, Massachusetts, in 1865, U.S. patent 51,741. This mechanism did not use the conventional percolation method as described above.

An Illinois farmer named Hanson Goodrich patented the modern U.S. stove-top percolator as it is known today, and he was granted U.S. patent 408,707 on 13 August 1889. It had the key elements of a conventional percolator: the broad base for boiling, the upflow central tube and a perforated basket hanging on it. Goodrich's design could transform any standard coffee pot of the day into a stove-top percolator. Subsequent patents have added very little.

Electric percolators have been in production since at least the first decade of the 1900s with General Electric publishing a pamphlet titled "Coffee Making By Electricity" in 1905. Automatic percolators have been available since the 1940s or earlier.

=== Improvements ===
The method for making coffee in a percolator had changed very little since the introduction of the electric percolator in the early part of the 1900s. However, in 1970 commercially available "ground coffee filter rings" were introduced to the market. The coffee filter rings were designed for use in percolators, and each ring contained a pre-measured amount of coffee grounds that were sealed in a self-contained paper filter. The sealed rings resembled the shape of a doughnut, and the small hole in the middle of the ring enabled the coffee filter ring to be placed in the metal percolator basket around the protruding convection tube.

Prior to the introduction of pre-measured self-contained ground coffee filter rings, fresh coffee grounds were measured out in scoopsful and placed into the metal percolator basket. This process enabled small amounts of coffee grounds to leak into the fresh coffee. Additionally, the process left wet grounds in the percolator basket. The benefit of the pre-packed coffee filter rings was two-fold: First, because the amount of coffee contained in the rings was pre-measured, it negated the need to measure each scoop and then place it in the metal percolator basket. Second, the filter paper was strong enough to hold all the coffee grounds within the sealed paper. After use, the coffee filter ring could be easily removed from the basket and discarded. This relieved the consumer from the task of cleaning out the wet coffee grounds from the percolator basket.

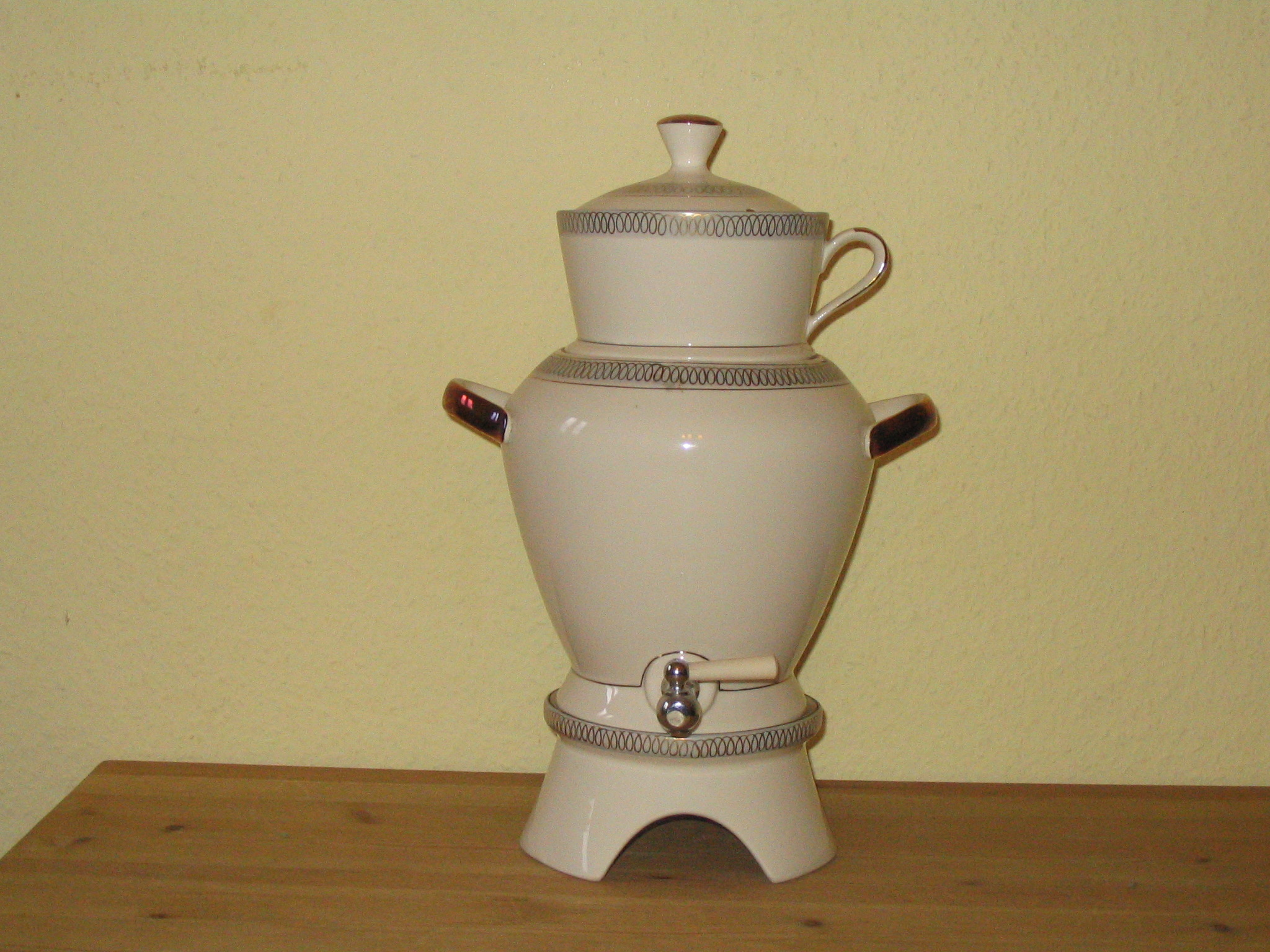
A German percolator named Neuerer Aromator in urn form

While most percolators use metal filter baskets the Neuerer Aromators used double-layered cross-slit porcelain filters similar to those in Karlsbad-style coffee makers, not requiring any paper ring filters.

=== Decline ===
With better brands of instant coffee and the introduction of the electric drip coffee maker, the popularity of percolators plummeted in the early 1970s, and so did the market for the self-contained ground coffee filters. In 1976, General Foods discontinued the manufacture of Max-Pax, and by the end of the decade, even generic ground coffee filter rings were no longer available. However, as of 2019, coffee percolator filters are still produced by the major coffee device maker Melitta and are readily available in stores and from online sources.

== Terminology and unrelated brewing methods ==
The name "percolator" is derived from the word "percolate" which means "to cause (a solvent) to pass through a permeable substance especially for extracting a soluble constituent". In the case of coffee-brewing the solvent is water, the permeable substance is the coffee grounds, and the soluble constituents are the chemical compounds that give coffee its color, taste, aroma, and stimulating properties.

While many popular brewing methods and devices use percolation to make coffee, the term "percolator" narrowly refers to devices similar to the stove-top coffee pots developed by Hanson Goodrich mentioned above. His percolator was one of the earliest coffee brewing devices to use percolation rather than infusion or decoction as its mode of extraction, and he named it accordingly. Other brewing methods based on percolation followed, and this early naming convention can cause confusion with other percolation methods.

A moka pot uses pressure and does not recirculate coffee into the brewing process.

In February 1813, Benjamin Thompson published his essay, "Of the Excellent Qualities of Coffee", in which he disclosed a design for a coffee roaster, and several designs for percolation methods which would now be most closely related to drip brewing.

Siphon brewers appeared in the early 1830s. Using a combination of infusion and percolation, they were the first development in coffee percolation. However, the complex, fragile devices remained a curiosity. Siphon brewing relies on vapor pressure to raise water from a pressure chamber up to the brewing chamber where the coffee is infused. Once the heat source has been removed from the pressure chamber, the atmosphere within cools, lowering the pressure and drawing the coffee through a filter and back into the pressure chamber. Distinctions from percolator brewing include the fact that the majority of the extraction takes place during the infusion phase (as an immersion brewer) and that the water is not recycled through the grounds.

Filter drip brewing (invented 1908, Melitta Bentz) uses a bed of coffee grounds placed in a holder with a filter to prevent passage of the grounds into the filtrate and hot water is passed through the grounds by gravity. This is distinct from percolator brewing due to the fact that the water is not recycled through the grounds, and the water does not have to be boiled to reach the brew chamber. (In many automatic drip machines, the water is boiled or nearly boiled to raise it through a tube to the brewing chamber, but this is an implementation detail specific to those machines, and not required by the process, which was first used manually.)

Moka brewing (invented 1933, Alfonso Bialetti) uses a bed of coffee grounds placed in a filter basket between a pressure chamber and receptacle. Vapor pressure above the water heated in the pressure chamber forces the water through the grounds, past the filter, and into the receptacle. The amount of vapor pressure that builds up, and the temperature reached, are dependent on the grind and packing ("tamping") of the grounds. This is distinct from percolator brewing in that pressure, rather than gravity, moves the water through the grounds; that the water is not recycled through the grounds; and that the water does not have to be boiled to reach the brew chamber. In the South of Europe, in countries like Italy or Spain, the domestic use of the moka expanded quickly and completely substituted the percolator by the end of the 1930s.

Since both percolator and drip brewing were available and popular in the North American market throughout the 1900s, there is little confusion in the United States and Canada between these methods. However, moka pots have only recently become readily available in that market; and vendors and customers alike often conflate moka pots with percolators, despite their fairly disparate mechanics and results.

== See also ==
- Coffee preparation
- Drip-O-lator
- Moka pot
- Samovar
- Vacuum coffee maker
