= Suspended meal =

Meal paid for in advance by a stranger

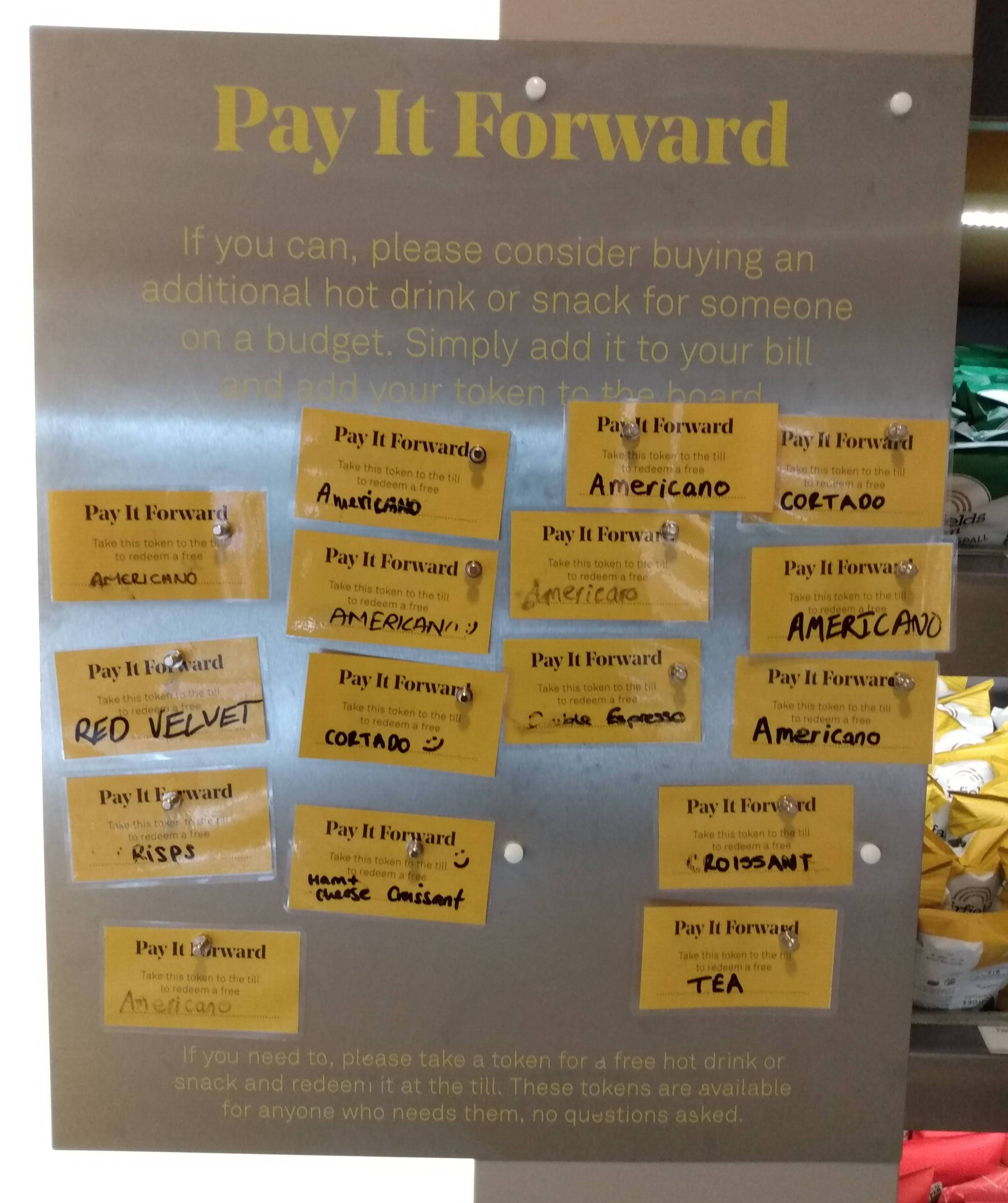
A board in the cafe of London's Royal Festival Hall, offering food and drinks which have been pre-paid for by other patrons

A suspended meal or pending meal is a meal which people pay for in advance, to be provided to those that request it later. The extra meal that they purchase is suspended; that is, the restaurant will mark down the sum of money and ‘suspend’ the additional meal for the poor. Suspended meals today range from a cup of coffee to a meal set.

== History ==
=== Vietnam ===
In Vietnam, the concept of suspended meals is known as "cơm treo" (hung-up meal). This practice is inspired by the "cà phê treo" (suspended coffee) model that originated in Italy, where customers pay in advance for a coffee to be given to someone in need. Similarly, "cơm treo" allows customers at eateries, especially popular rice shops known as "cơm bình dân" and "cơm tấm" restaurants, to pay for an extra meal which is then offered to homeless individuals, elderly people living alone, or children without guardians.

These eateries, which serve affordable and nutritious meals including rice, various meats, fish, and vegetables, act as community hubs where people can quietly support others by asking, "Do you take cơm treo today?" ("Hôm nay quán có nhận cơm treo không?"). Upon payment, the extra meal is noted by the shop and provided to a person in need who visits later. This anonymous act of kindness ensures that the giver and receiver do not meet, maintaining the dignity of the receiver.

In addition to "cơm treo," the practice of "cà phê treo" continues to be popular in several regions, such as Đồng Tháp Province. Here, cafes invite patrons to pay for extra beverages that are then distributed to those in need, including street vendors and low-income workers.

=== Turkey ===
In Turkey, a tradition going back centuries called askıda ekmek, meaning "bread on a hanger” or “suspended bread" involves paying for two bread and taking one while the other is hung for someone else later.

=== Italy ===
The term in English originates from a tradition that started in Italy, called pending coffee, or in Italian, caffè sospeso. Customers would pay for their own coffee and when they wanted to, could pay for an extra ‘suspended coffee’ or a 'suspended meal' which was meant for the less fortunate. Thus, a person could walk into the cafe and ask if there was a suspended coffee that they could drink. The trend started in cafes of Naples, where people who had experienced good luck or people of middle class would pay for an extra cup of coffee. Then, the poor would come by later and ask if there was any sospeso that could be given for free to them. Such trend has been adopted by other cafes and restaurants that now incorporate the concept of suspended meals.

=== Hong Kong ===
Suspended meals in Hong Kong started in a restaurant called Siu Mei Restaurant in Sham Shui Po (北河燒蠟飯店). Originally, the boss, Mr. Chan gave out free meals to the poor in Sham Shui Po, an impoverished district. The news of Mr.Chan’s act soon became publicized and non-governmental Organizations started to cooperate with Mr. Chan to implement the suspended meal scheme. Slowly, more and more food stores, including bakery, dessert, and meal shops in Sham Shui Po adopted the system, too.

In 2012, a TV program called “Rich Mate Poor Mate Series” (窮富翁大作戰) featured Simon Wong, the owner of LHGroup) and expertise in catering services. He spoke about his organization starting at the grassroots, and how he has strived to strengthen the social responsibility of his chain restaurants by launching schemes of suspended meals.

=== Taiwan ===
In Taiwan, several methods have been implemented to make the public more familiar with the concept of suspended meals. For example, there is a Facebook page, “Suspended meal, Taiwan”, advocating the ideas of suspended meal. The owners of the restaurants can join this page and inform the people that their restaurants are supporting suspended meals. Also, there are photos and descriptions in the page; more details are exposed to the potential consumers of suspended meals like the location of the restaurants and what kind of meals the restaurants are serving. There are also figures indicating the number of meals left in the restaurant.

=== Dubai ===
A Pending Meal initiative was started on social media in April 2015 by Sarah Rizvi, focusing on restaurants in Dubai. Once the news of the initiative started to spread, many local restaurants were willing to tie up and provide their support too. The idea spread to other areas including Sharjah, Abu Dhabi, Ras Al Khaimah, U.S.A, Canada, Sri Lanka, India and Pakistan.

The Pending Meal movement encourages people to pay for someone else’s meal at a food outlet so the less fortunate can walk in and eat.

There is no limit to how much one can donate to the cause. "There have been people who have paid in advance for the meal of just one person and some have even paid for 15", said Rizvi.

The Pending Meal initiative is not a charity organization and does not collect funds (in any form). The initiative is purely encouraging people to give back to community by providing less fortunate with a meal so that no one has to stay hungry.

== Value ==
The value of this rising trend lies greatly on disseminating the attitude of sharing and giving what we owe to others, so as to bridge the gap between the poor and urban people. However, it must be reminded that the phenomenon should not be viewed as a type of social assistance. In other words, there is no labelling effect in the promotion of the campaign; the focus is not placed on the poor, but rather on the act of citizens suspending meals. This way, individuals can both respect the poor, and promote the natural attitude of helping. Through the collaboration of everyone, the poor can be integrated into the community and feel a sense of belonging. “It’s about communities coming together and looking after people directly in their communities.”, says John Sweeney, the founder of a page advocating suspended coffee, in an interview with TruthAtlas.

== Critics ==
=== Business ethics ===
Despite sharing the same motivation, restaurants and companies have their own operation style in terms of promoting the suspended meal scheme. Because of such difference, some argue that the restaurant owners are trying to make profits by cheating on the scheme rather than helping the needy. Similarly, some people believe that the companies are more likely to cheat on the scheme since they will charge a sum of administrative expenses after holding the fund-raising events like suspended meals.

=== Effectiveness in resolving the poverty problem ===
Some people argue that suspended meals cannot effectively ameliorate the poverty problem in Hong Kong in terms of effective implementation. A big proportion of the poor, in fact, denies to take the suspended meal because of their strong dignity. According to a survey conducted by Children Welfare League, 32% of needy children dare not to take free meal because they do not want to disclose personal information and feel shameful. Moreover, people may ask for a free meal although they do not have financial difficulty. In other words, the effectiveness of suspended meals cannot be fully estimated and guaranteed.

== See also ==
- Caffè sospeso
