= Moka pot =

Device used for brewing coffee

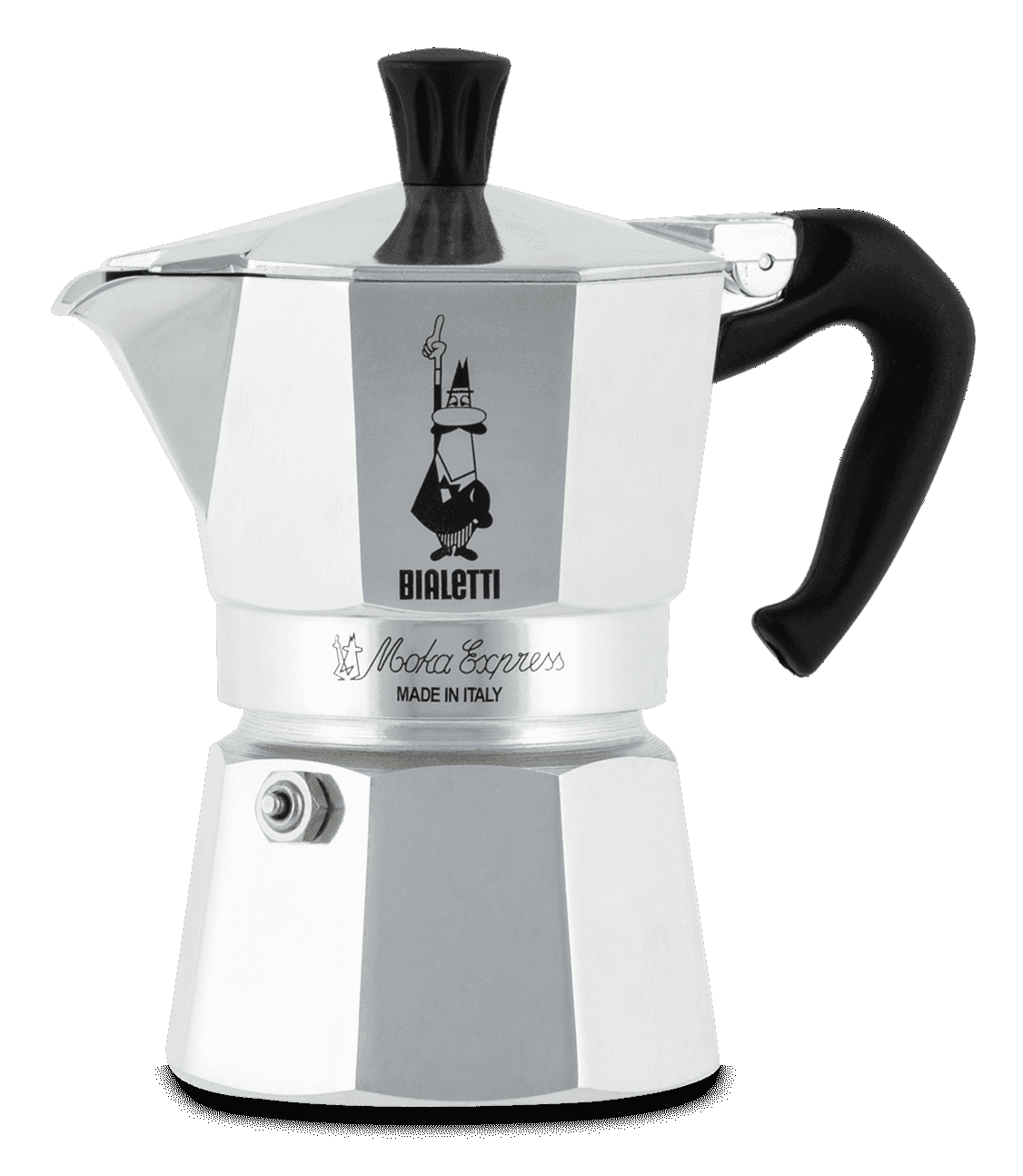
- Bialetti Moka Express
- Industry: Coffee in Italy
- Application: Coffee preparation
- Inventor: Samuel Parker (1833); Alfonso Bialetti (c. 1933)
- Manufacturers: Alessi; Bialetti; De' Longhi; Giannini; (et al.)

The moka pot is a stove-top or electric coffee maker that brews coffee by passing hot water driven by vapor pressure and heat-driven gas expansion through ground coffee. Named after the Yemeni city of Mokha, it was popularized by Italian aluminum vendor Alfonso Bialetti and his son Renato starting from 1933. It quickly became one of the staples of Italian culture. Bialetti Industries continues to produce the original model under the trade name "Moka Express".

Spreading from Italy, the moka pot is today most commonly used in Europe, Latin America, and Australia. It has become an iconic design, displayed in modern industrial art and design museums including the Wolfsonian-FIU, the Cooper–Hewitt, National Design Museum, the Design Museum, the London Science Museum, The Smithsonian and the Museum of Modern Art. Moka pots come in different sizes, making from one to eighteen 50 ml (2 imp fl oz; 2 US fl oz) servings.

The original design and many current models are made from aluminium with Bakelite handles, though they are sometimes made out of stainless steel or other alloys. Some designs feature an upper half made of heat-resistant glass.

== Use ==
The bottom chamber (A) contains water. When heated, steam pressure pushes the water through a basket containing ground coffee (B) into the collecting chamber (C).

Moka pots are used over a source of heat, typically a flame or electric range. Stainless steel pots, but not aluminium, can be used with induction cooking.

There are three major components in a typical moka pot:

1. The lower chamber or lower vessel, also known as the boiler, which is fitted with a safety valve to prevent over-pressurization
2. The filter funnel or basket, which compresses an annular rubber gasket when the moka pot is assembled and seals against an upper filter disc
3. The upper chamber or upper vessel, also known as the collector, which is where the coffee is deposited during the brewing process

The moka pot is assembled first by inserting the filter funnel into the lower chamber, then threading the upper chamber onto the lower chamber, which compresses the rubber gasket against the lip of the filter funnel to seal the lower chamber. Generally, the upper filter disc is retained on the bottom of the upper chamber by the rubber gasket, which acts as a flexible internal circlip; this filter disc prevents coffee grounds from moving up the spout of the upper chamber.

=== Preparation ===
The boiler (marked A in the diagram) is filled with water to an etched line (or slightly below the safety release valve). While at-home makers generally do not preheat the water used, it can expedite the brewing process in commercial settings. The metal filter funnel (B) is inserted. Finely ground coffee is added to the filter. How tightly the coffee is packed impacts how quickly the coffee extracts and the strength of the brew. The collector (C) is then attached and the pot is heated.

Stages of brewing coffee with a moka pot

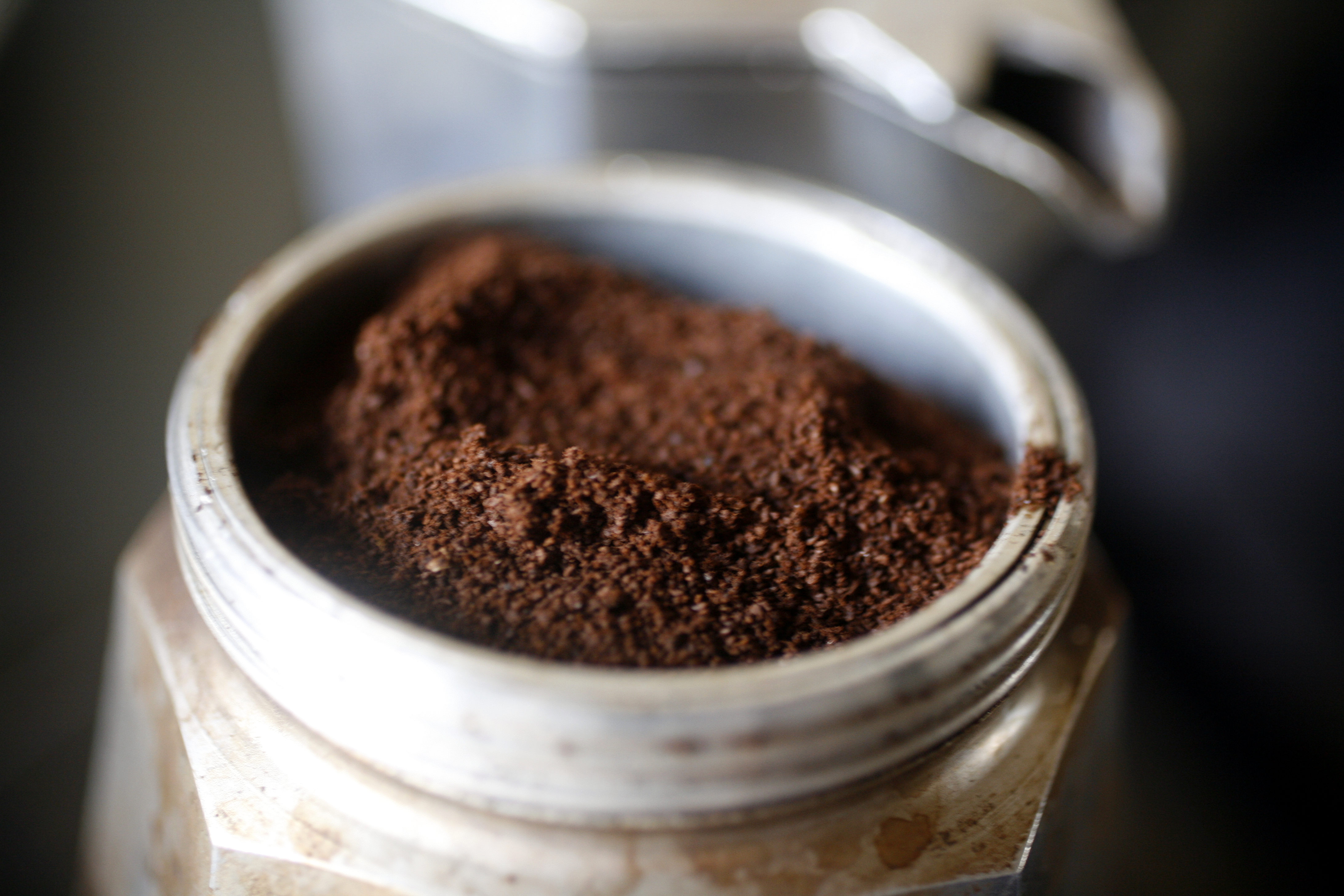
Funnel with ground coffee

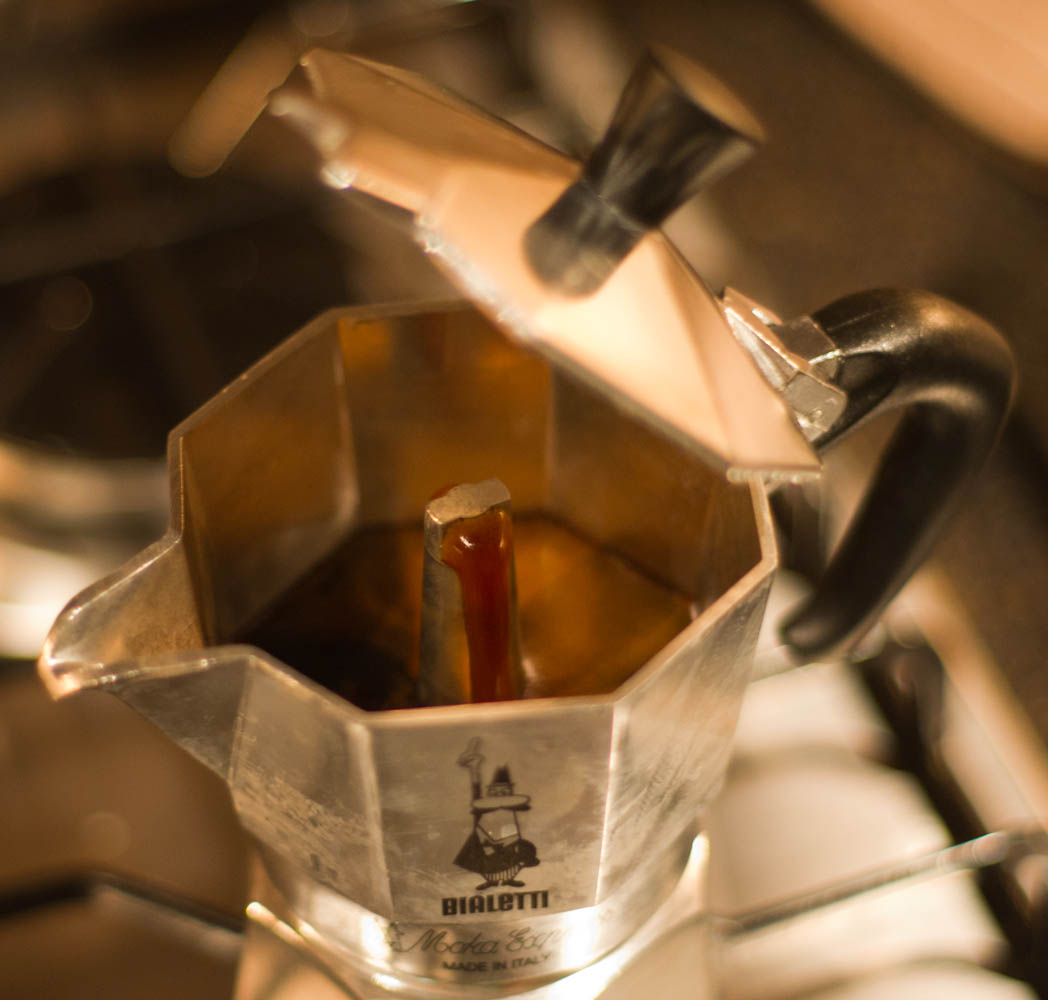
Mid-brew, showing brewed coffee in the process of being transported through the spout

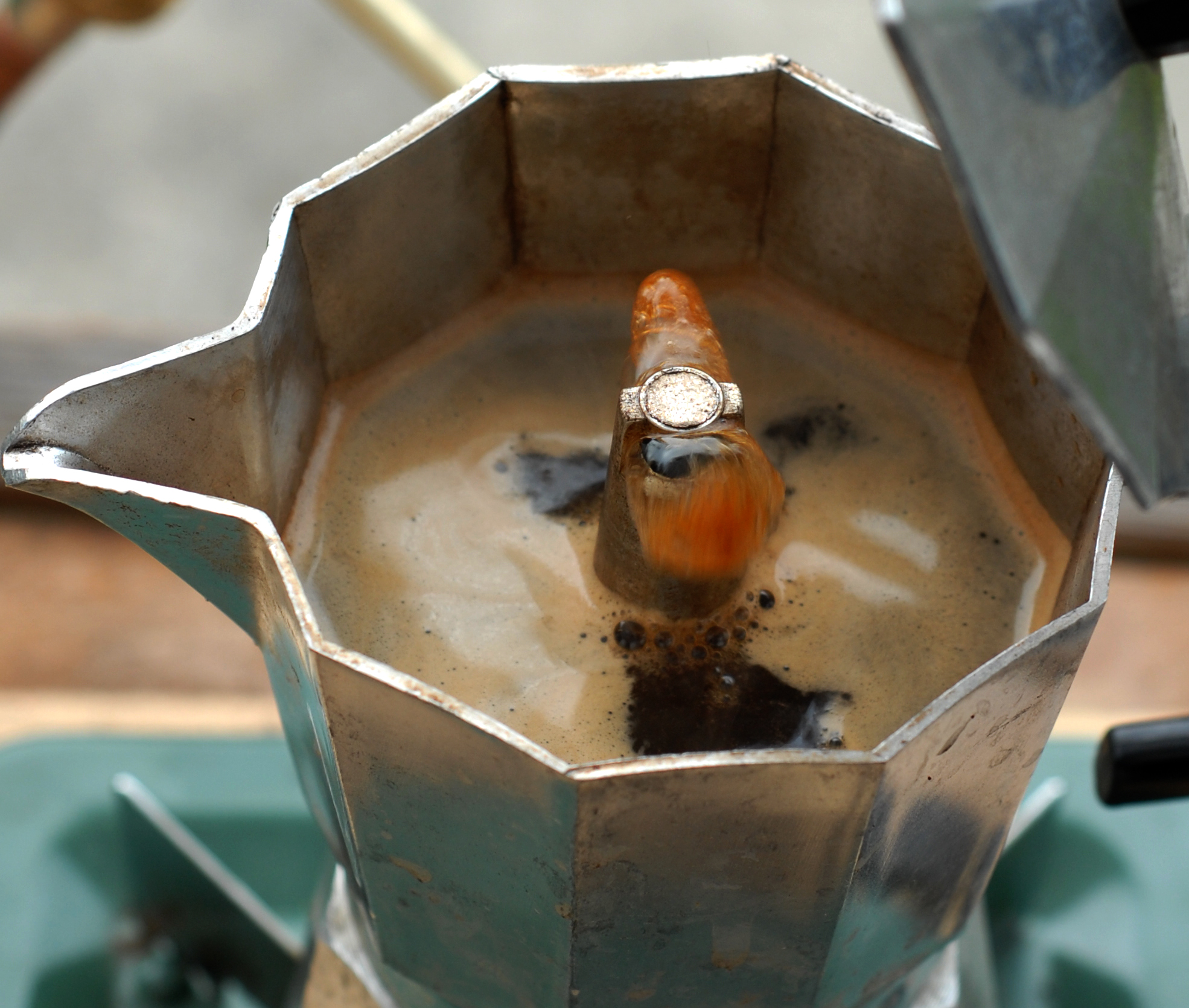
Layer of crema developing

=== Brewing ===
How the moka pot works

X-ray video of a moka pot in use

The heating of the boiler (A) leads to a gradual increase of the pressure due to both the expansion of the enclosed air and the raised vapor pressure of the increasingly heated water. When pressure becomes high enough to force the water up the funnel through the coffee grinds, brewed coffee rises through the vertical spout and pours into the upper chamber (C).

When the lower chamber is almost empty, bubbles of steam mix with the upstreaming water, producing a characteristic gurgling noise—a signal that brewing should be stopped. Navarini et al. call this the "strombolian" phase of brewing, which allows a mixture of highly heated steam and water to pass through the coffee, which leads to rapid overextraction and introduction of undesirable flavors.

Unlike a standard percolator, the moka pot never sends brewed coffee back through the coffee grounds.

A number of physics papers were written between 2001 and 2009 utilizing the ideal gas and Darcy's laws, along with the temperature-dependent vapor pressure of water, to explain the moka pot's brewing process.

=== Moka coffee characteristics ===
Brewed coffee flavor, including that of a moka pot depends greatly on bean variety, roast level, fineness of grind, water profile, and the level of heat used.

Moka pots are sometimes referred to as stove-top espresso makers. However, a typical moka coffee is extracted at relatively low pressures of 1 to 2 bar (100 to 200 kPa), while standards for espresso coffee specify a pressure of 9 bar (900 kPa). Therefore, moka coffee is not considered to be an espresso. Typically, the moka pot uses a ratio of coffee to water, by mass, of approximately 1:10, resulting in a brew with approximately 3–4% dissolved solids. In comparison, espresso is "stronger" with 9–10% dissolved solids, and drip-brewed coffee is "weaker" with approximately 2% dissolved solids.

The caffeine content of moka coffee has been measured at 128–539.9 mg/100mL.

== Maintenance ==
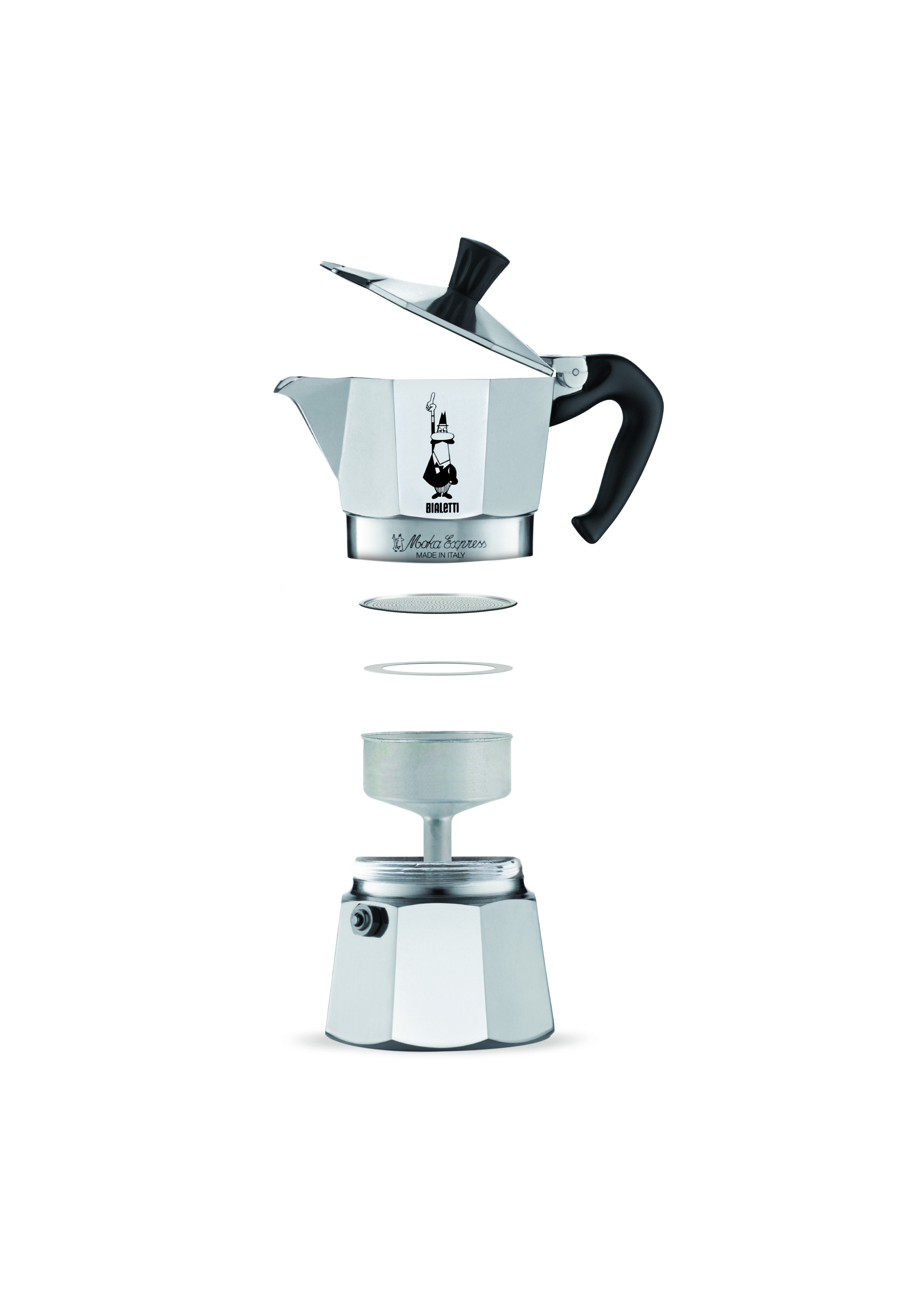
Disassembled Bialetti Moka Express, showing (bottom to top) the bottom chamber (boiler) with safety valve, funnel filter, seal, upper filter disc, and upper chamber (collector).

Moka pots require periodic replacement of the rubber seal, a scouring of its removable filter, and a check that the safety release valve is not blocked. All parts of the pot should be scrubbed by hand using water, avoiding detergent as aluminium moka pots are not dishwasher safe.

=== Aluminium migration ===
The potential for toxic amounts of aluminium migration being created by brewing an acidic beverage in an aluminium pot have been scientifically investigated, and determined to be "negligible" – falling below 1% of recommended total weekly intake level once a new pot has been used. Following the pot's stabilization at below 1% with regular use, migration rose to a maximum observed level of just under 4% after a dishwasher cleaning, resulting in dishwasher use being strongly discouraged.

== History and variants ==
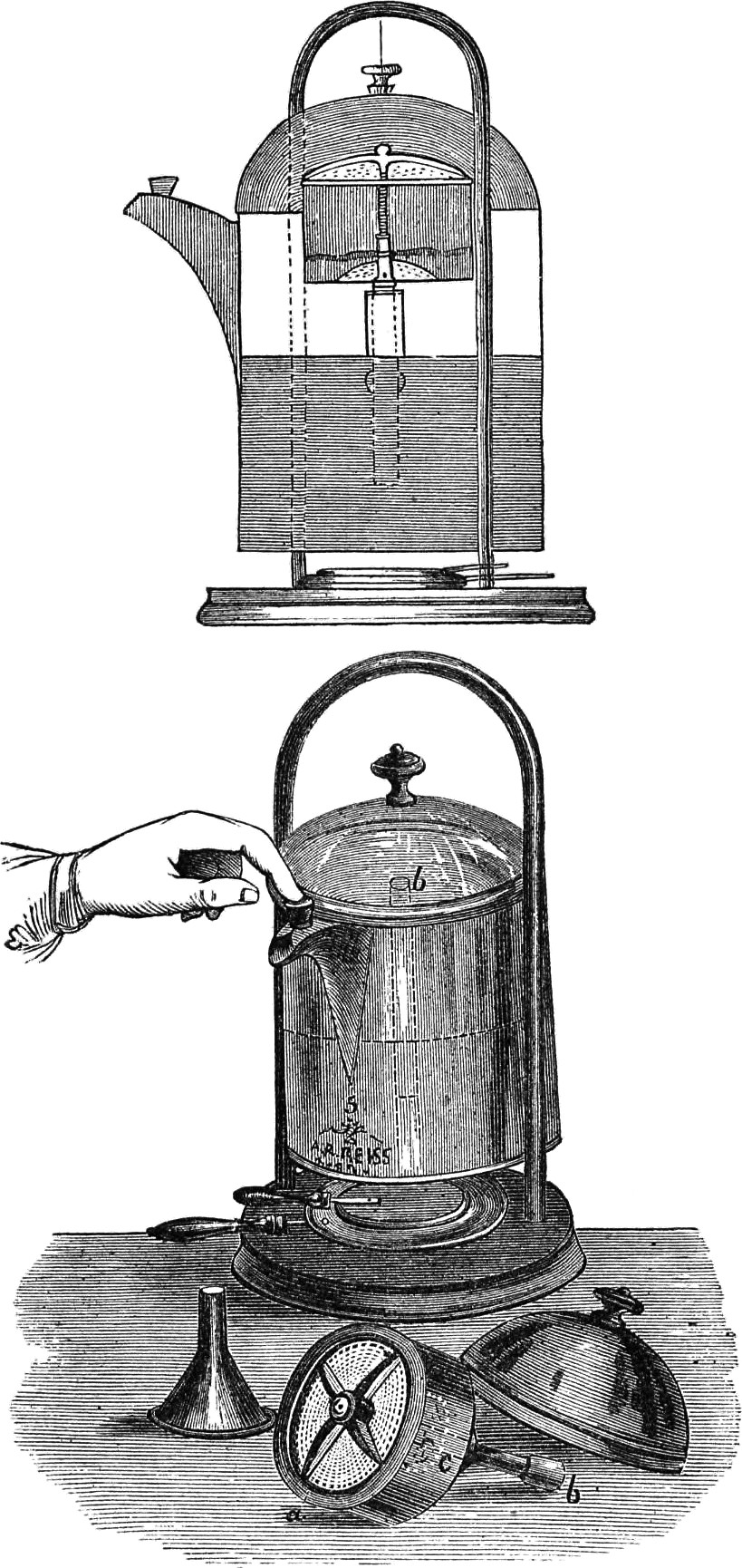
Steam pressure-driven coffee machine (1868)

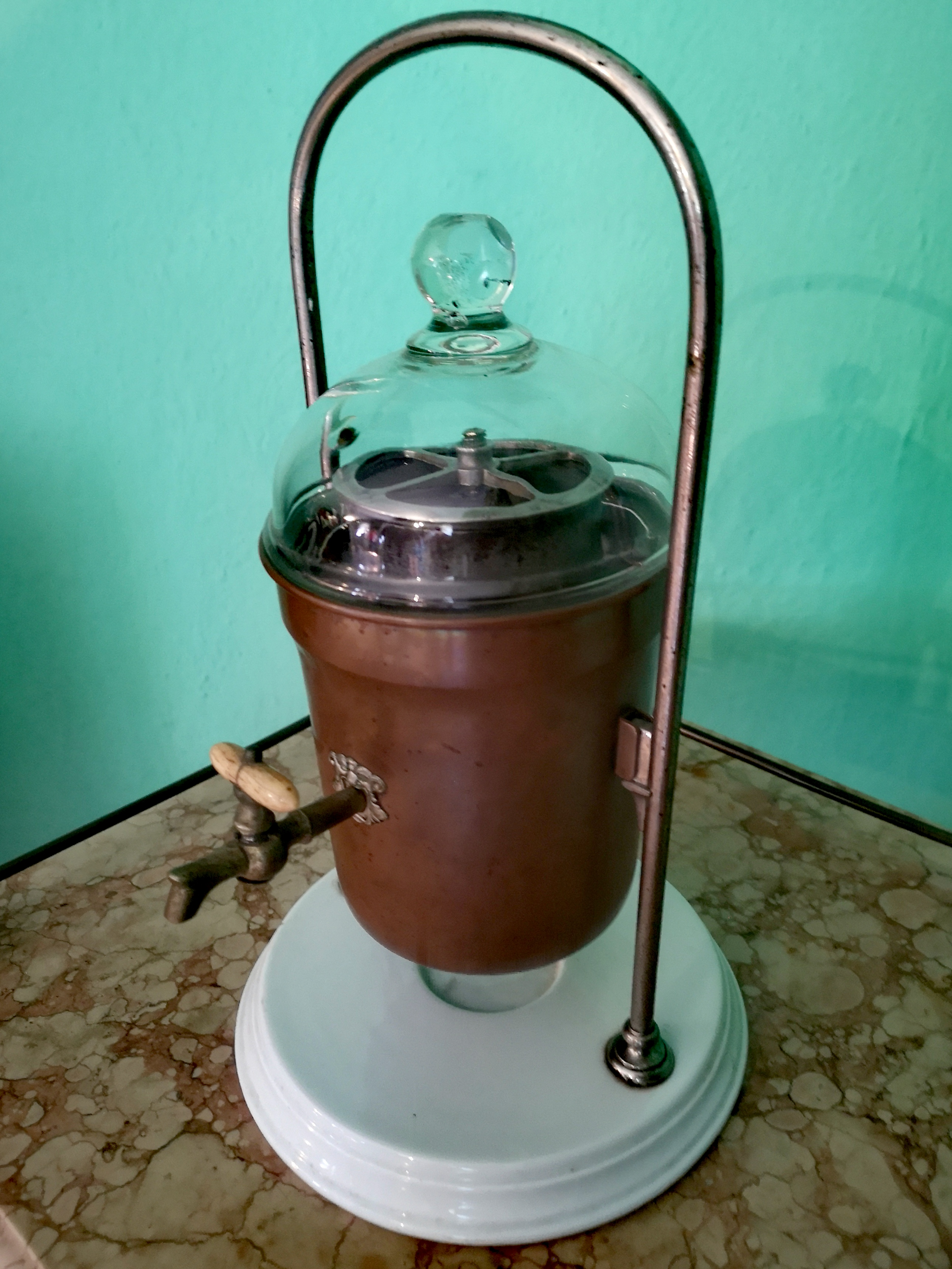
Coffee machine c. 1900 similar to Parker's Steam Fountain

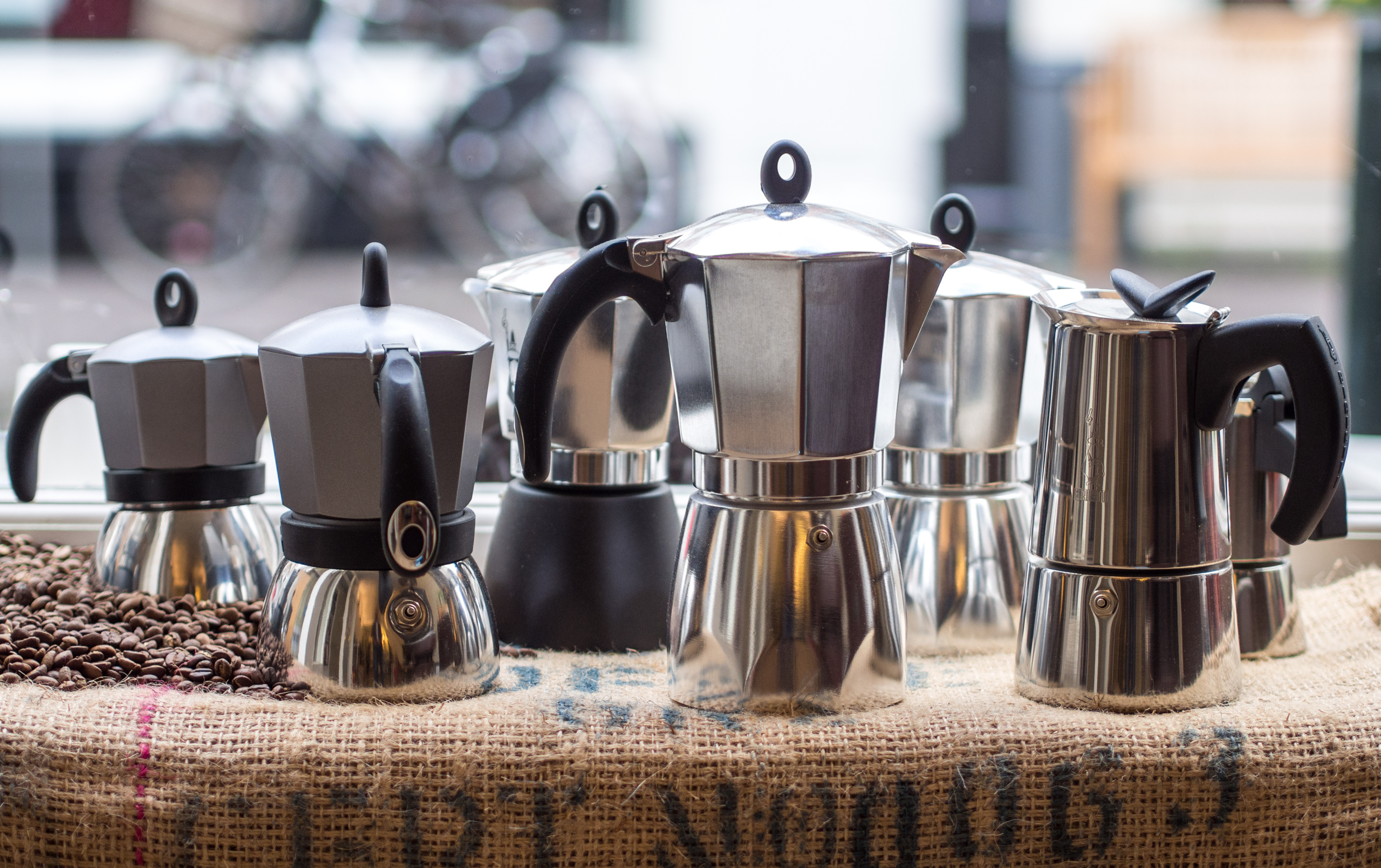
Several models of Bialetti moka pot

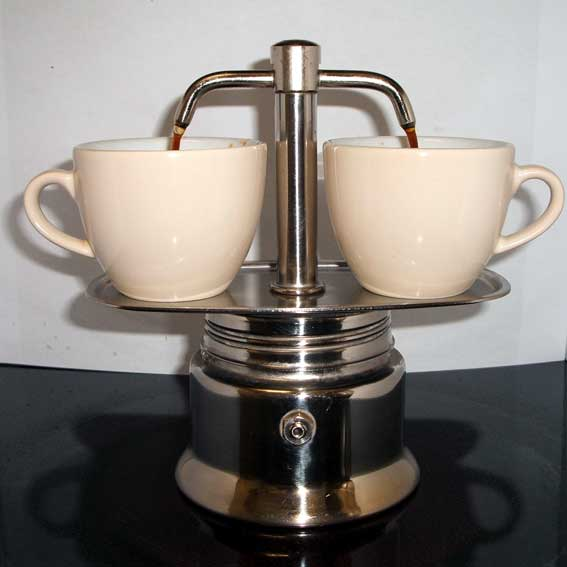
Moka 2 Cup Coffee Fountain

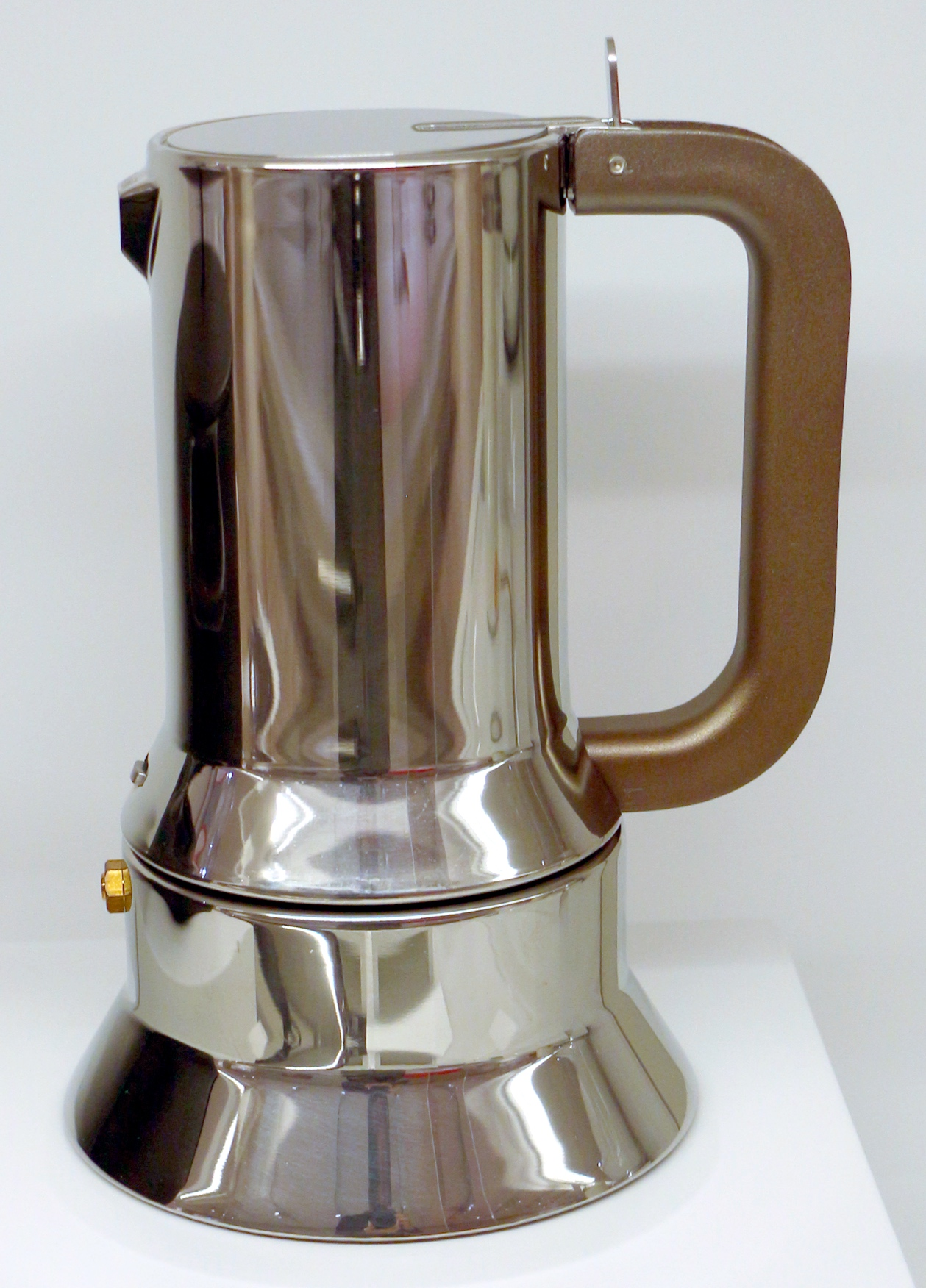
Alessi 9090 coffee maker designed by Richard Sapper (1978)

The principle of brewing coffee by using steam to force heated water through a bed of roasted, ground beans dates back to at least 1818, according to a patent published by Elard Römershausen for a very large machine. A more portable machine incorporating the same basic principle was designed by Louis Bernard Rabaut in 1822, according to drawings submitted to the French Academy of Sciences, followed by similar designs by Andre Caseneuve (1824), Edouard Doublet, and Pierre-Isidore Rouen (1833).

Samuel Parker, a coppersmith from Middlesex, England was granted a patent on January 11, 1833, for a tabletop machine which used a brewing method that sends self-pressurized hot water from a sealed vessel vertically through a bed of packed coffee grounds into a collector, as an improvement on the coffee percolator. Parker's "Steam Fountain" was sold starting in the 1840s, featuring a cylindrical body with two concentric vessels: an inner boiler and outer collector, topped by a glass dome which served to redirect the brewed coffee into the collector. It later became known as the "Vienna Incomparable". Similar steam pressure-driven devices were invented in Paris by Alexandre Lebrun (1838) and in Berlin by H. Eicke (1878).

Alfonso Bialetti popularized the machine for home use, initially marketing the Moka Express starting in 1933, but relatively few were sold until his son Renato embarked on a major marketing campaign after the latter took over the family business in the 1940s, including the commissioning of the company's iconic mascot, l'omino con i baffi, in 1952. According to the company, the design of the original Moka Express has not changed since its debut. Bialetti Industries applied for a patent in 1946 describing an apparatus which uses the same brewing method but arranges the vessels side by side, rather than stacking them vertically.

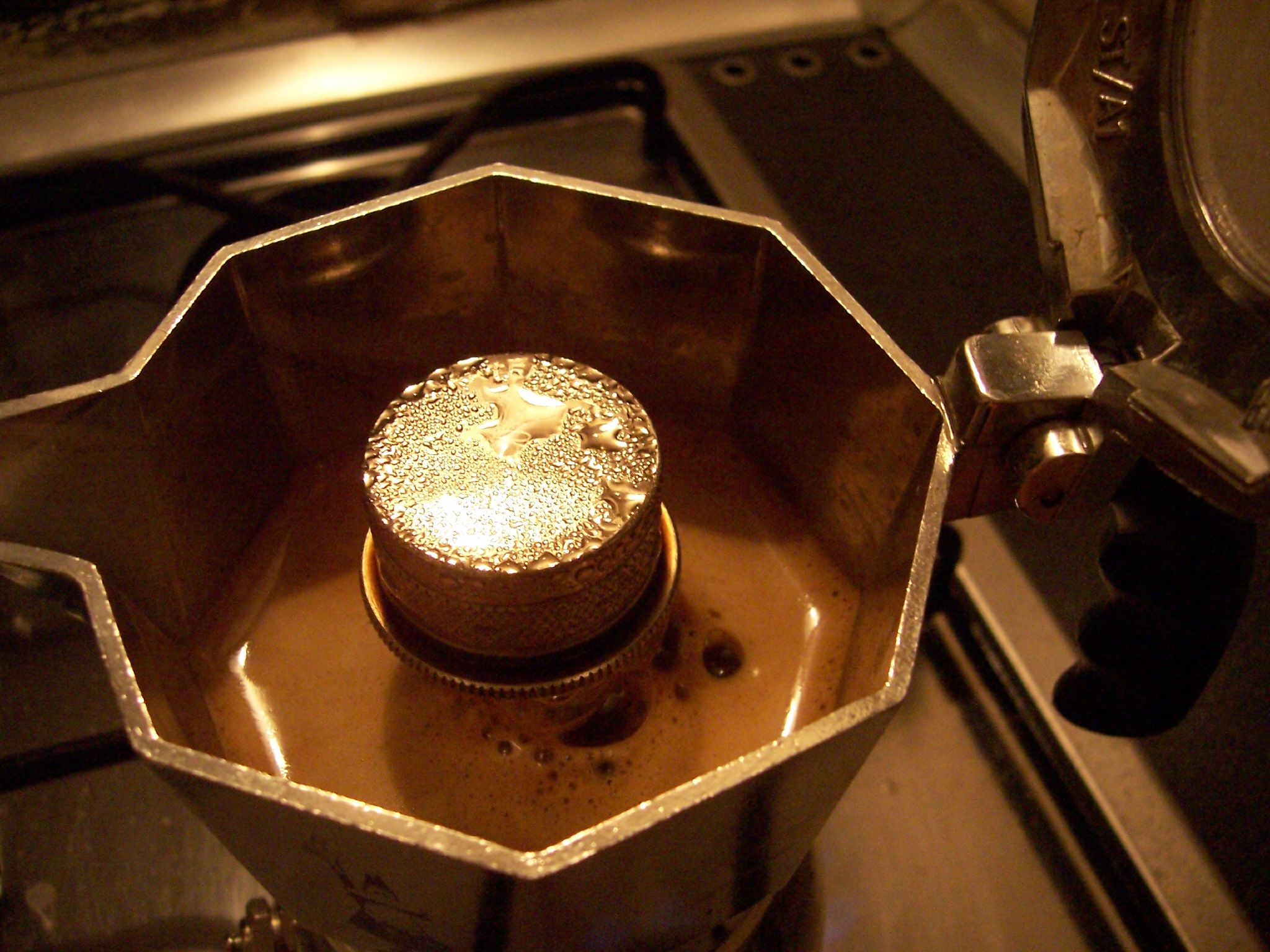
Brewing in Brikka, with visible crema

Among the variations to the moka pot design that have been introduced since the 1930s are those that integrate an electric heating element in the boiler, expedite brew time, create milk froth, and allow microwave brewing.

To expedite brewing, a weighted valve called Cremavent has been added as a pressure regulator on top of the nozzle that allows pressure to build up inside the water tank in a manner similar to a pressure cooker. As pressure builds up more quickly in this method (since there is much less leakage of vapour) compared to the standard moka pot, it reaches the level required for water to rise through the ground coffee in a shorter time. The result is coffee brewed at a higher pressure and temperature than the standard pot, making it more similar to espresso and therefore with more visible crema.

Another variation (the Bialetti Mukka Express) allows for milk to be frothed and mixed with the coffee during brewing.

=== Pot sizes ===
Moka pots are sold in various sizes based on the number of demitasse cups they produce, measuring approximately 40–60 ml (1–2 US fl oz) per cup. The following table lists sizes for some popular Bialetti Moka pots:

Bialetti Moka pot sizes
Cup size	Aluminum ("Moka Express" / Moka Induction (Note: Moka Induction models include an aluminum boiler base clad in stainless steel for compatibility with induction hobs. Available in 2-, 4-, and 6-cup sizes.) / Brikka (Note: 2- or 4-cup sizes. Brikka 2-cup size uses Moka Express 3-cup size gasket and filter, and Brikka 4-cup size uses Moka Express 6-cup size gasket and filter.) / Dama / Mini Express (Note: 2-cup size only. Shares base with Moka Express 2-cup.) / Break)				Stainless steel ("Venus" / "Musa" / "Kitty")			
Cup size	volume	height	base	gasket	volume	height	base	gasket
1	60 ml (2 US fl oz)	135 mm (5 1/4 in)	70 mm (2 3/4 in)	40×51 mm (1 5/8×2 in)	—N/a			
2	90 ml (3 US fl oz)	145 mm (5 3/4 in)	80 mm (3 1/4 in)	41×57 mm (1 5/8×2 1/4 in)	85 ml (3 US fl oz)	140 mm (5 1/2 in)	80 mm (3 1/4 in)	42×52 mm (1 5/8×2 in)
3	130 ml (4 1/2 US fl oz)	160 mm (6 1/4 in)	90 mm (3 1/2 in)	50×65 mm (2×2 1/2 in)	—N/a			
4	185 ml (6 1/2 US fl oz)	180 mm (7 in)	95 mm (3 3/4 in)	50×65 mm (2×2 1/2 in)	170 ml (5 1/2 US fl oz)	170 mm (6 3/4 in)	95 mm (3 3/4 in)	51×65 mm (2×2 1/2 in)
6	250 ml (8 1/2 US fl oz)	215 mm (8 1/2 in)	105 mm (4 1/4 in)	55×71 mm (2 1/8×2 3/4 in)	235 ml (8 US fl oz)	200 mm (7 3/4 in)	105 mm (4 1/8 in)	56×72 mm (2 1/4×2 7/8 in)
9	410 ml (14 US fl oz)	245 mm (9 3/4 in)	115 mm (4 1/2 in)	63×81 mm (2 1/2×3 1/4 in)	—N/a			
10	—N/a				460 ml (15 1/2 US fl oz)	230 mm (9 in)	130 mm (5 1/8 in)	69×85 mm (2 3/4×3 3/8 in)
12	595 ml (20 US fl oz)	285 mm (11 1/4 in)	135 mm (5 1/4 in)	74×90 mm (2 7/8×3 1/2 in)	—N/a			
18	800 ml (27 US fl oz)	320 mm (12 1/2 in)	135 mm (5 1/4 in)	74×92 mm (2 7/8×3 5/8 in)	—N/a			

== See also ==
- Coffee in Italy
- Coffee percolator
- Vacuum coffee maker
- Neapolitan flip coffee pot
- Indian filter coffee
- Coffee filter
- French press
- Pirouette: Turning Points in Design – 2025 exhibition at the Museum of Modern Art
- List of works in the Museum of Modern Art
