= Caffè sospeso =

Coffee paid for in advance as charity

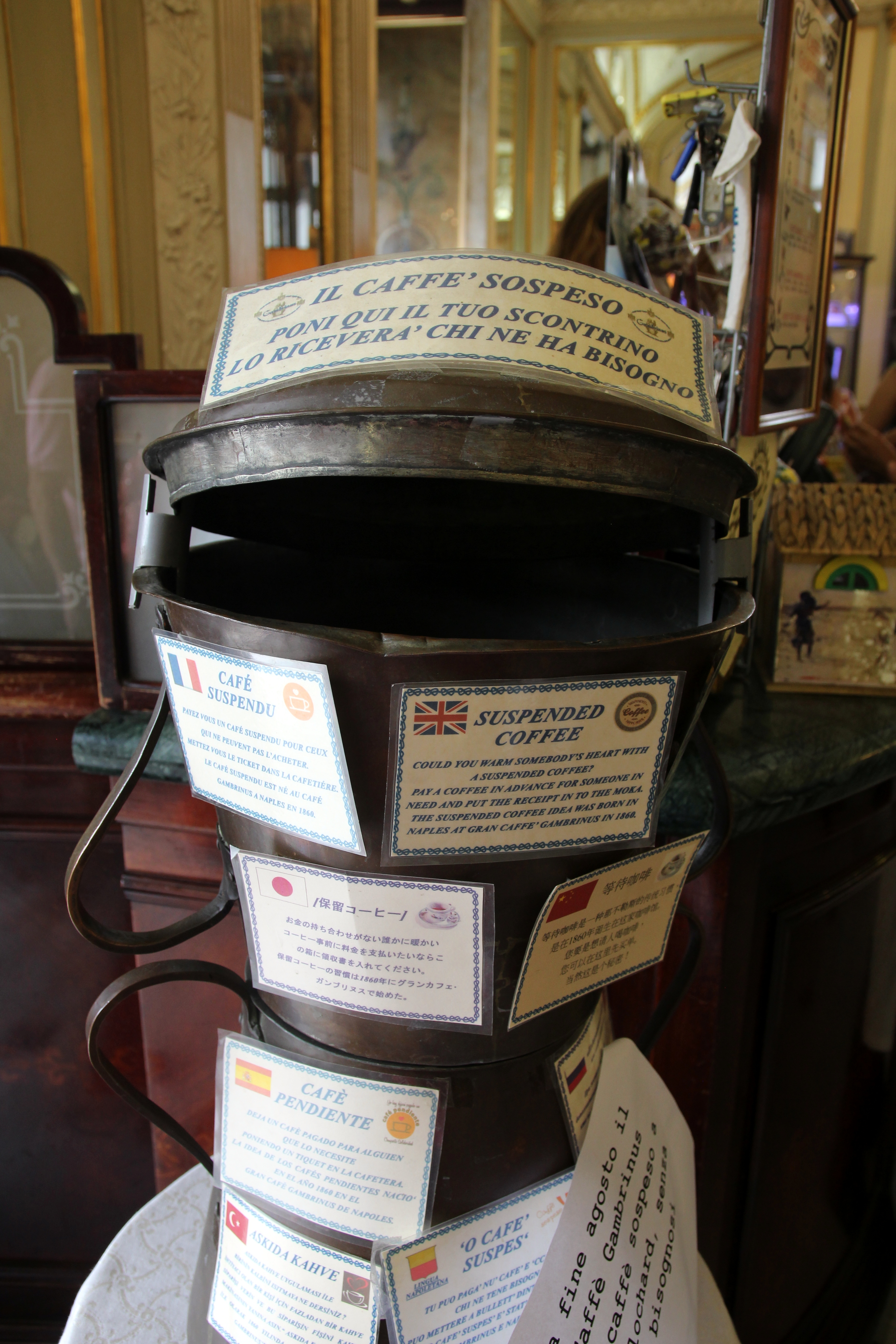
Container in a Naples cafe, where customers can place a receipt for a second unserved coffee, for a later customer to retrieve and claim

A caffè sospeso (Italian: [kafˈfɛ ssoˈspeːso]; Neapolitan: cafè suspiso [kaˈfɛ ssuˈʃpiːsə]), or pending coffee, is a cup of coffee paid for in advance as an anonymous act of charity. The tradition began in the working-class cafés of Naples, Italy, where someone who had experienced good luck would order a sospeso, paying the price of two coffees but receiving and consuming only one. A poor person enquiring later whether there was a sospeso available would then be served a coffee for free. Coffee shops in other countries have adopted the sospeso to increase sales, and to promote kindness and caring.

== History ==
One 2010 account claims the tradition was over 100 years old, but declined during the postwar economic boom, so that it is mainly observed around Christmas time. A 2008 article reported the tradition was obsolete, the reporter having visited three bars where it had not been observed for at least 15 years. Aurelio De Laurentiis is reported to pay for ten sospesi after each victory by S.S.C. Napoli, the football club of which he is chairman.

The sospeso gave the title to a 2008 journalism collection by Neapolitan Luciano De Crescenzo, Il caffe sospeso: Saggezza quotidiana in piccoli sorsi, which helped publicise the tradition throughout Italy. The idea has been reported in cafés in Bulgaria, Ukraine, Australia, Canada, Romania, Russia, Spain, Argentina, the United States, and Costa Rica. The idea received a revival in Italy in 2011 with several small Italian festivals forming a Suspended Coffee Network to encourage solidarity in response to cultural budget cuts, and a Dutch campaign at Christmas 2011 gave a discount on the price of the donated coffee. In December 2011, Neapolitan authorities declared an annual "Suspended Coffee Day".

In March 2013, John Sweeney launched a Facebook page for "Suspended Coffees", which by 2015 had led to the purchase of over 15 million coffees in 34 countries.

The UK arm of coffee chain Starbucks signed up for a charity initiative based on the suspended coffee concept in April 2013, in which it said it would match the value of each suspended coffee with a cash donation to the Oasis charity. The growth of the trend in other coffee shops in the UK also received media coverage around the same time.

On 22 July 2013, a Tuesday, an anonymous customer in Edmonton, Canada, paid for 500 large coffees at Canadian coffee chain Tim Hortons. This started a trend that spread to a total of 30 locations with over 10,000 cups of coffee being paid for by donors.

On 10 September 2021, a Friday, an anonymous customer in Istanbul, Turkey, paid for 501 Turkish coffees at Turkish food chain Dönerci Metin Usta, the largest suspended coffee donation ever recorded in 100 years.

There are accounts of the practice reviving in southern Italy, and not just for coffee, as a response to economic hardship caused by the 2020 COVID-19 lock-down.

== Symbolism ==
The caffè sospeso has been identified as a symbol of grassroots social solidarity, prompting its revival in response to the 2008 recession and ensuing eurozone crisis. In 2004, a giornata nazionale del sospeso at Easter was announced by the Ronde della carità charity. In 2011, a Giornata del Caffè Sospeso was scheduled to coincide with Human Rights Day in December. A collection of Italian arts festivals emphasising social solidarity in 2010 came together under the umbrella "Rete del Caffè Sospeso". An Italian fundraising website started by Luca Argentero is called 1caffe.org.

== See also ==
- Suspended meal

== Bibliography ==
- Author unknown (2013-04-22). Give if you wish, get if you want: Suzhou restaurant joins 'suspended meal' movement. Suzhou Daily, 22 April 2013. Retrieved on 2013-04-24 from https://web.archive.org/web/20160303221301/http://epaper.subaonet.com/sr/html/2013-04/22/content_311021.htm.
