= Reversible coffee pot =

Flip-over coffeemaker that relies on gravity

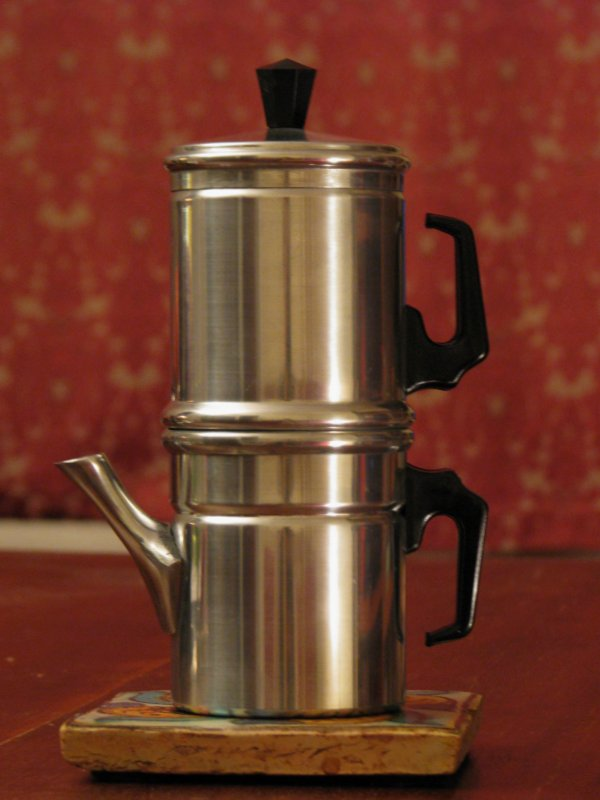
A typical Neapolitan flip coffee pot. The pot has already been "flipped". There is no opening at that end of the pot; a lid has been placed there for storage.

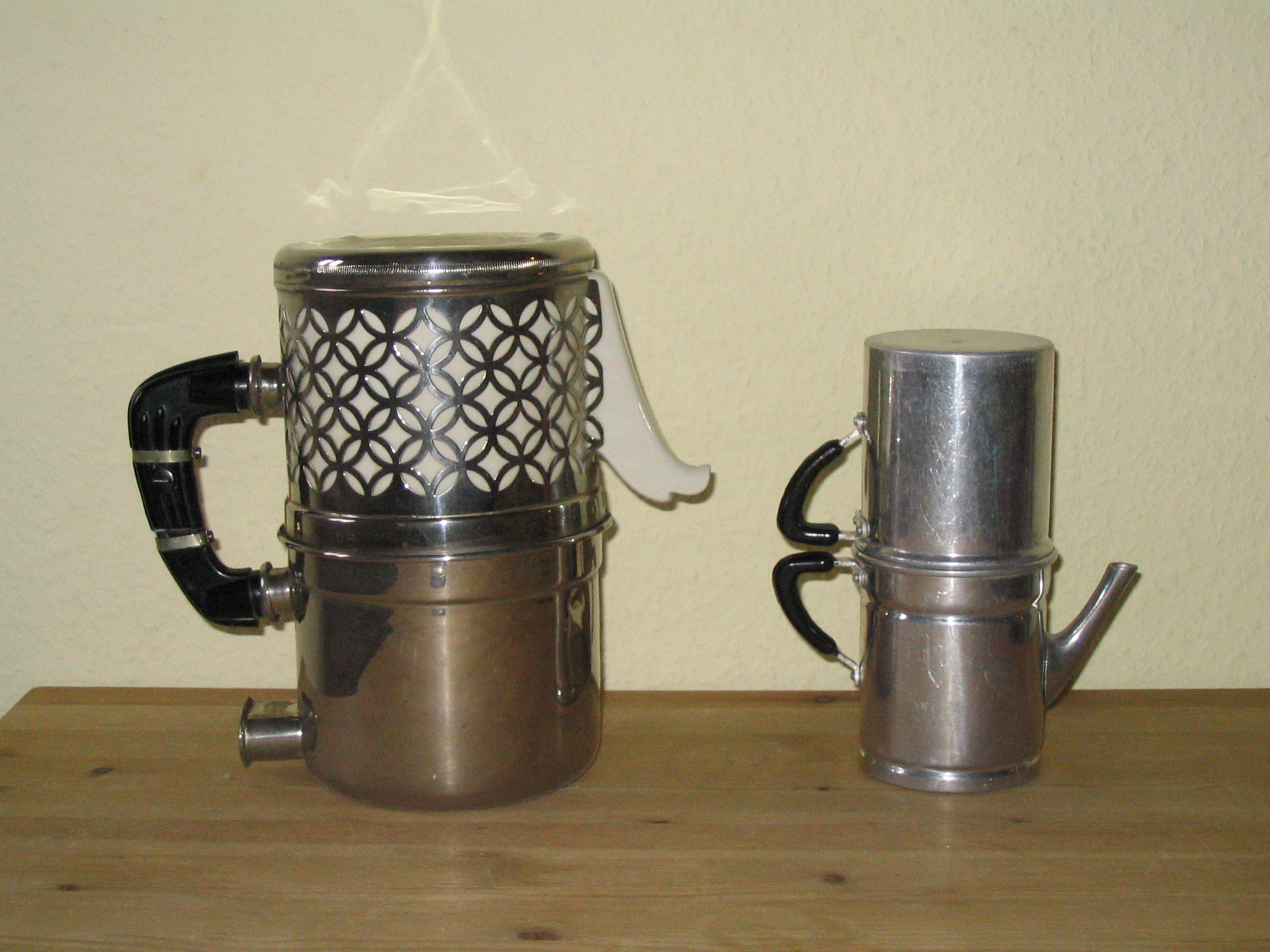
Neapolitan and electrical flip pot

The Neapolitan flip coffee pot (Italian: napoletana or caffettiera napoletana, pronounced [kaffetˈtjɛːra napoleˈtaːna]; Neapolitan: cuccumella, pronounced [kukkuˈmɛllə]) or cafetière Morize is a drip brew coffeemaker for the stove top very popular in Italy and France until the 20th century. Unlike a moka express, it does not use the pressure of steam to force the water through the coffee, relying instead on gravity.

== History ==
The napoletana was invented in 1819 by Jean-Louis Morize, a tinsmith and lampmaker from Paris, France. It was originally constructed out of copper, until 1886, when the material was switched to aluminum. The reason for taking its name from the Italian city of Naples in English is unknown.

The namesake cuccumella derives from cuccuma, meaning 'copper or terracotta vase'.

== Cuppetiello ==
The cuppetiello is a small paper cone (which is used in other ways in Naples, such as holding food) that goes over the spout. This is used to preserve the aroma of the coffee while it drips into the tank, which can take up to 10 minutes or more. To make a cuppetiello, a small piece of paper is folded to create a cone shape. Eduardo De Filippo offers a description of the cuppetiello and the importance of coffee in Naples.

== Variants ==
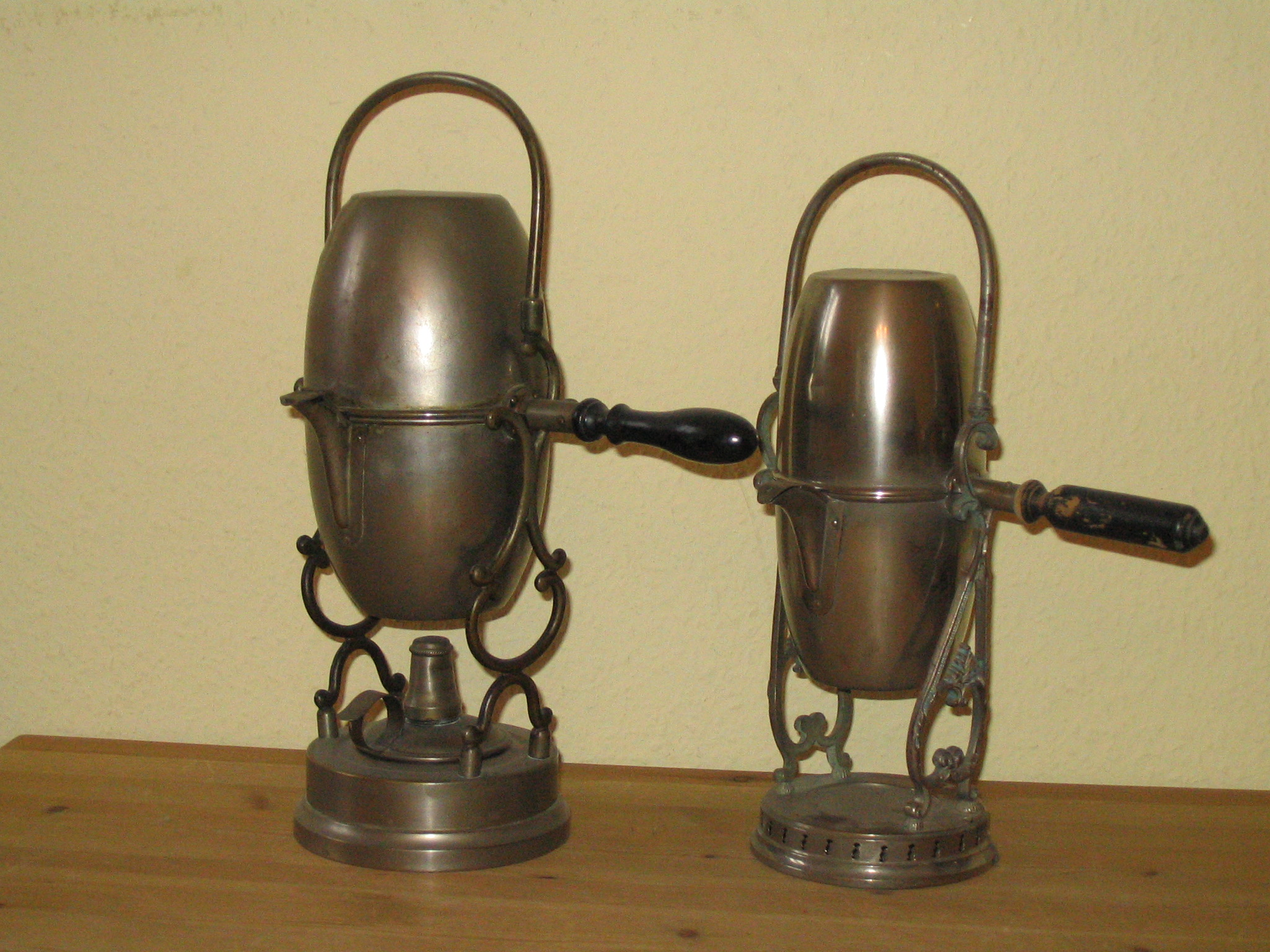
Potsdam boilers from Germany around 1880

Some of the finely crafted coffee pots manufactured in the late 19th-century work on the same principle, including the Russian reversible pot a.k.a. Russian egg, and the reversible Potsdam cafetière a.k.a. Potsdam boiler. Another variant was the Arndt'sche Sturzmaschine (not to be confused with the Arndt'sche Caffee-Aufgussmaschine). A spirit cooker heats the mounted flippable pot.

== Classic designs ==
Italian Riccardo Dalisi redesigned this classic for Alessi. He began his research in 1979 and earned international attention when his design entered into production in 1987. As they have come back to gain some popularity, ILSA now also makes them in stainless steel.

== See also ==
- Moka pot – similar looking, but different type of pot
- Cafetière du Belloy – similar looking, but different type of pots
