= Friesland Porzellan =

German porcelain and ceramics manufacturer

Coordinates: 53.39769°N 8.06754°E

Friesland Porzellan logo since 1982 (Note: The "Friesland Germany" porcelain mark and logo was introduced in 1982 (with the new service Schloss Gödens^{[A]}). The tea service Zen, which was introduced in 1981, was (still) labelled "Melitta Porzellanfabrik Friesland Germany".)

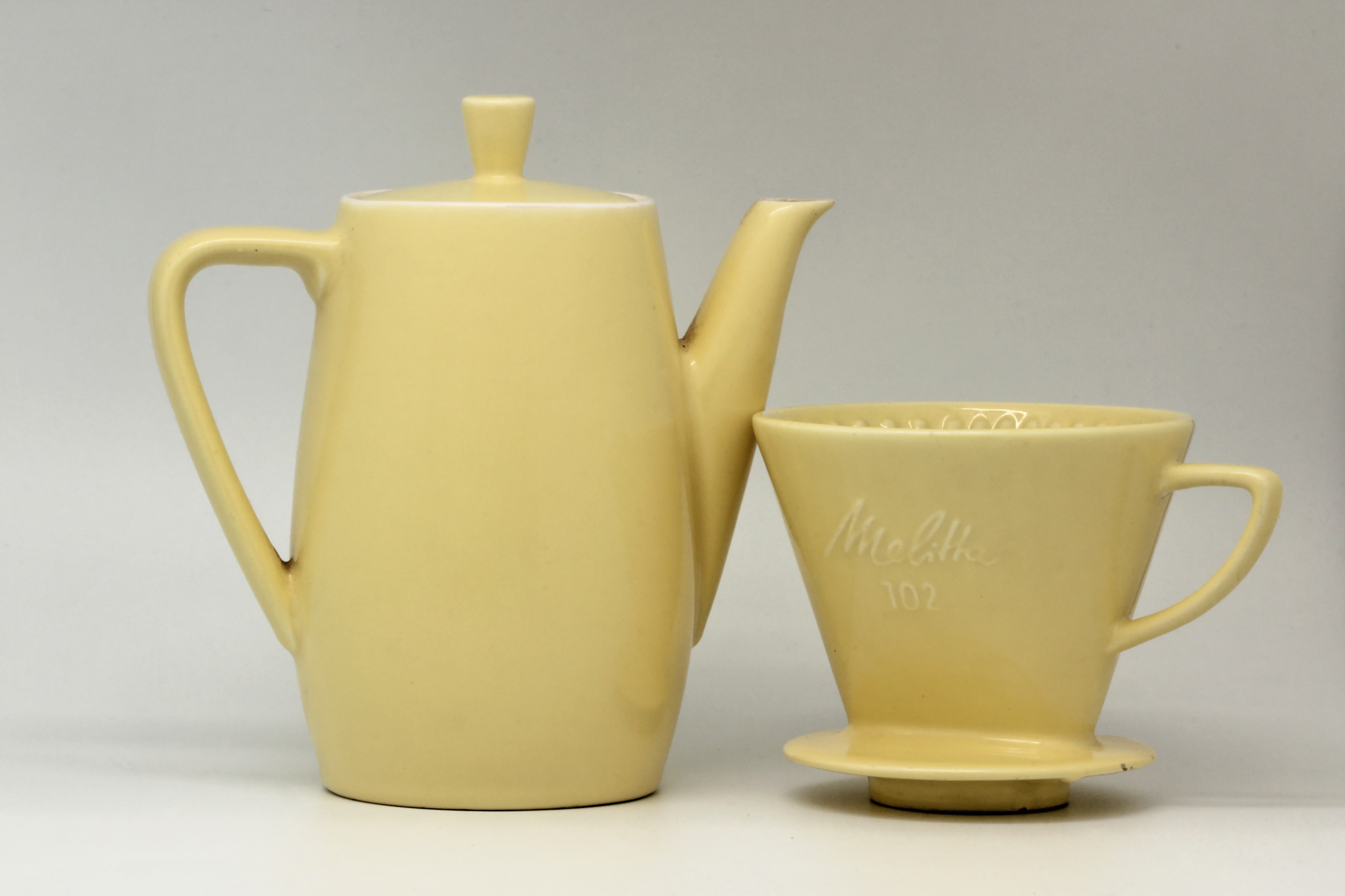
Ceramics coffee pot and Melitta coffee filter 102

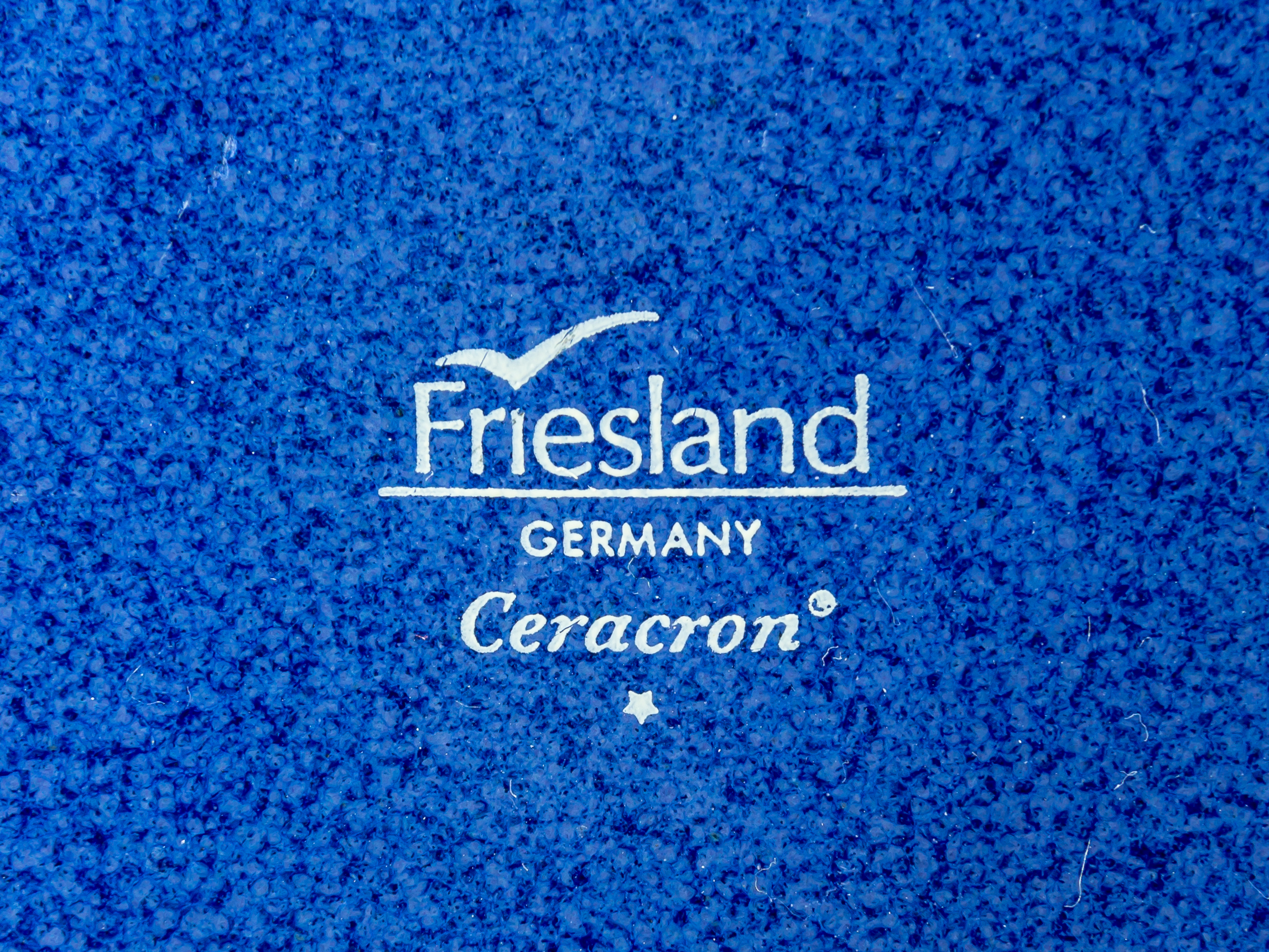
Porcelain mark of Friesland porcelain since 1982

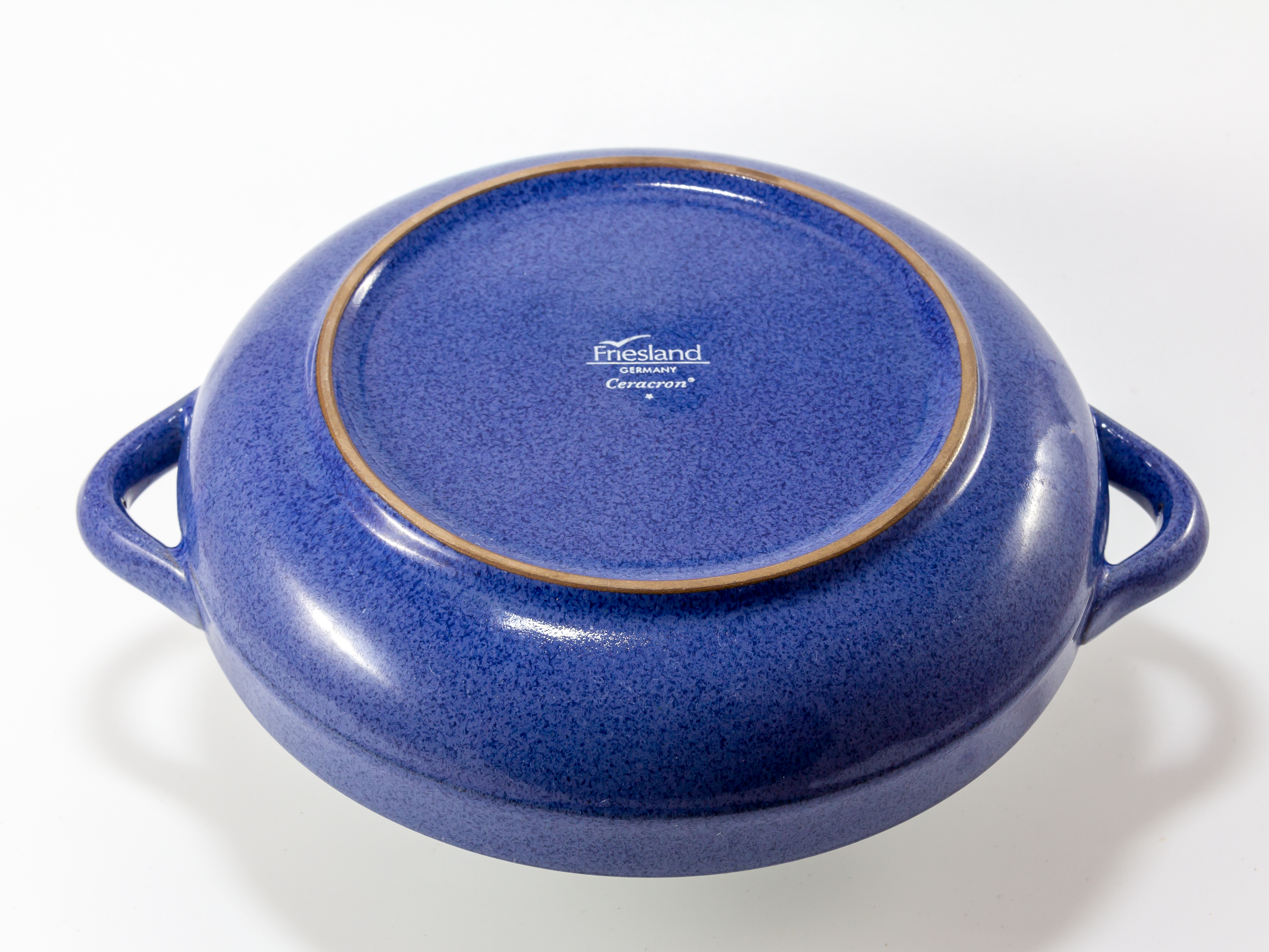
Backside of soup bowl Ammerland blau

Friesland Porzellanfabrik GmbH & Co. KG, based in Varel-Rahling, Germany, in the Friesland district, is a German manufacturer of porcelain, stoneware and earthenware, in particular coffee and table services for everyday and upscale needs. It was originally founded in 1953 as a subsidiary of Melitta-Werke Bentz & Sohn producing under the "Melitta" label. In 1982, they started to also manufacture under their own "Friesland Germany" brand, finally becoming independent of Melitta in 1995. After several restructures in the 2000s, Friesland Porzellanfabrik GmbH was taken over by the Dutch company Royal Goedewaagen in spring 2019. The headquarters of the new corporate group RGW Friesland Porzellan Gruppe is still in Varel. The Royal Goedewaagen Group became the Bornego Group in 2021.

== History ==
On 13 August 1948, the Niedersächsisches Ministerium für Wirtschaft und Verkehr ('Lower Saxony Ministry of Economics and Transport') granted the merchant August Heinrich Caspritz, who came from Tolkemit, permission to build and operate a factory for the production of electrical porcelain, stove tiles and tableware on the site of a former anti-aircraft equipment depot. After bankruptcy in 1953, the factory was continued by Horst Wolfgang Bentz under the name Porzellanfabrik Friesland, Zweigniederlassung Melitta-Werke Bentz & Sohn as part of the Melitta group of companies. This was Melitta's response to the barely satisfied demand for coffee filters, as, after the Second World War, Melitta's former paper filter factory in Kreuzau near Düren had been destroyed and the Concordia porcelain factory in Sadov-Lesov (formerly Sodau-Lessau), which was used by Melitta between 1941 and 1945, was now located in the Czechoslovakia.

The factory site, which was 8.7 hectares (Note: While the original size of the company site was 8.7 ha according to Oeftering (1956), modern sources mention a size of close to 12 ha, leading to the conclusion that the site must have been increased at some point in time before 2010.) in size at the time, was rented by Melitta employee Adolf Hagemann in March or October 1953. (Note: The sources differ in regard to the exact date of Adolf Hagemann's rent of the site: Oeftering (1956) mentions two dates: 1953-03-15 (in a letter) and 1953-10-15 (in a form). In 2020, August Heinrich Caspritz's son stated a date of 1953-10-26, claiming to cite the original 1953 correspondence.) The production of porcelain and paper in Rahling began in 1953. Melitta finally acquired the company premises for 325000 DM in 1957.

By 1954, the Rahling plant's product range already included porcelain coffee filters, matching stoneware coffee pots, large filters for the catering trade and filter paper. Initially, up to 4 tons of filter paper were produced daily, but later production was increased to 20 tons. By the end of 1955, one million porcelain coffee filters had already been produced in Rahling. The plant subsequently developed into an important production site for the Melitta company. The director of the Kunsthochschule Kassel, the designer Jupp Ernst, was a personal friend of Horst Bentz and had a great influence on the company's marketing from the mid-1950s.

Ernst not only developed the characteristic Melitta word mark for Melitta, but also the green and red color concept for the packaging of the Melitta filter bags. In 1956, he introduced Melitta coffee table ceramics to complement the coffee filters and, from 1959, designed the Ascona (form 4), Zürich (form 5) and Paris (form 21) coffee services.

The first stoneware coffee service was produced in 1956, followed by the first porcelain service in 1958. The Minden (form 1) stoneware service, glazed in pastel colors and derived from the "form 0" jug designed by Jupp Ernst, was a commercial success. During this time, filters were produced, some of which were color-coordinated with the coffee pot, and sold as a Filka set (Filter & Kanne, filter & jug). From 1957, the company also produced doll dishes, which were offered as miniature versions of Melitta coffee filters and tableware series in various colors under the name Melitta Kinder-Filter-Party, among others. The company began expanding production at the end of the 1950s. On a newly installed casting line, up to 180000 porcelain coffee filters could now be produced per month in three-shift operation.

After the filter paper production was moved to Minden in 1959, the company subsequently concentrated entirely on coffee service production. In the same year, the designer Lieselotte Kantner joined the company. Over the next 20 years, she designed numerous award-winning tableware services, including the Helsinki, Berlin (form 57), Kopenhagen (form 25) and Jeverland (form 59) series.

=== 1960s onwards ===
In the 1960s, the company set up its own design department for porcelain tableware, which Lieselotte Kantner headed, where she followed the company's principle Form - Farbe - Gebrauchswert (form - colour - use value) in her designs. In addition to the designs by Jupp Ernst, Lieselotte Kantner and Karl Leutner, the appearance of the product range was shaped by the decorations of Claus Dombrowsky and Melanie Martens.

In the first half of the 1960s, over 1200 people worked in Rahling, the majority of them women. The product range was expanded in 1966 to include the production of dinner services. In 1969, the 25 millionth coffee pot in the Minden series was produced.

As a result of market saturation and increasing competition from abroad, sales of ceramic products in the Federal Republic of Germany began to stagnate in the early 1970s. The company took various rationalization and modernization measures to counteract this development. After the Melitta porcelain factory in Rehau was closed, the Rom (form 28), Verona (form 56) and Madrid (form 53) tableware series produced there continued to be produced in Rahling. In 1974, construction began on its own shipping and track hall for optimized shipping. After the rationalization measures were completed, around 700 people were still working in the factory in 1977.

In the mid-1970s, the tableware collection was fundamentally revised. The two series Jeverland (form 59) (porcelain service) and Ammerland (form 63) (Ceracron service) were launched on the market. Both series were extremely successful and are still produced today. In 1978, the rustic, fireproof cookware made of Ceracron came onto the market and also became a long-term commercial success. In addition to the fireproof cookware, a cookbook was published in the early 1980s.

At the same time, Melitta changed its corporate strategy and developed the factory in Rahling as an independent business area, with sales and shipping in-house (previously located in Minden). From 1979, the company operated as Porzellanfabrik Friesland Bentz KG. In a second stage, the brand name Friesland Porzellan was introduced in 1982.

The new marketing strategy included placing products in popular women's magazines, including Brigitte, Bunte, Journal für die Frau, Freundin and Wohnidee. Attractive celebrities were also used as advertising media, including Liselotte Pulver for the Lindau (form 58) and Jeverland (form 59) tableware services. In the mid-1970s, the company managed to win Luigi Colani as a designer. In 1974, he designed the black Ceracron Zen tea service for the company. It came onto the market in 1981. In 1984, the Life (form 50 or 51 (Note: Some form numbers, including the forms 24, 50, 51 and 54, appear to have been used multiple times and seem to be ambiguous.)) series by designer Lutz Rabold was introduced. Its design is reminiscent of the HEWI Türdrücker 111 door handle that was popular at the time. The series is still produced today as Life Revival (form 51 or 54).

At the end of 1987, Hans-Georg Peter, who had joined the company in 1958 and served as managing director since 1967/1968, handed over the business to Hans-Wilhelm Wiedei who had joined as managing director in May 1987. Peter subsequently retired in mid-1988.

=== Takeovers ===
In 1991, Melitta sold 70 percent of the company shares. At that time, the company employed only 300 people. The company was continued to be run as Porzellanfabrik Friesland GmbH by the two senior employees Hubertus Hinse and Klaus Müller via a management buyout. In 1995, they also took over the remaining 30 percent of the company. However, losses in sales and company pensions from the Melitta era led to the company going bankrupt in 2004. At that time, only 175 employees were still working in Varel. A holding company Friesland Porzellan GmbH with 85 employees was founded by Hinse, but could not prevent the company from going bankrupt again in 2005.

The shareholder and managing director Uwe Apken took over the traditional company and restructured it as Friesland Porzellanfabrik GmbH & Co. KG, initially with partner Albrecht Danne, later alone. In 2010, an online shop was founded as Friesland Versand GmbH.

=== Recent ===
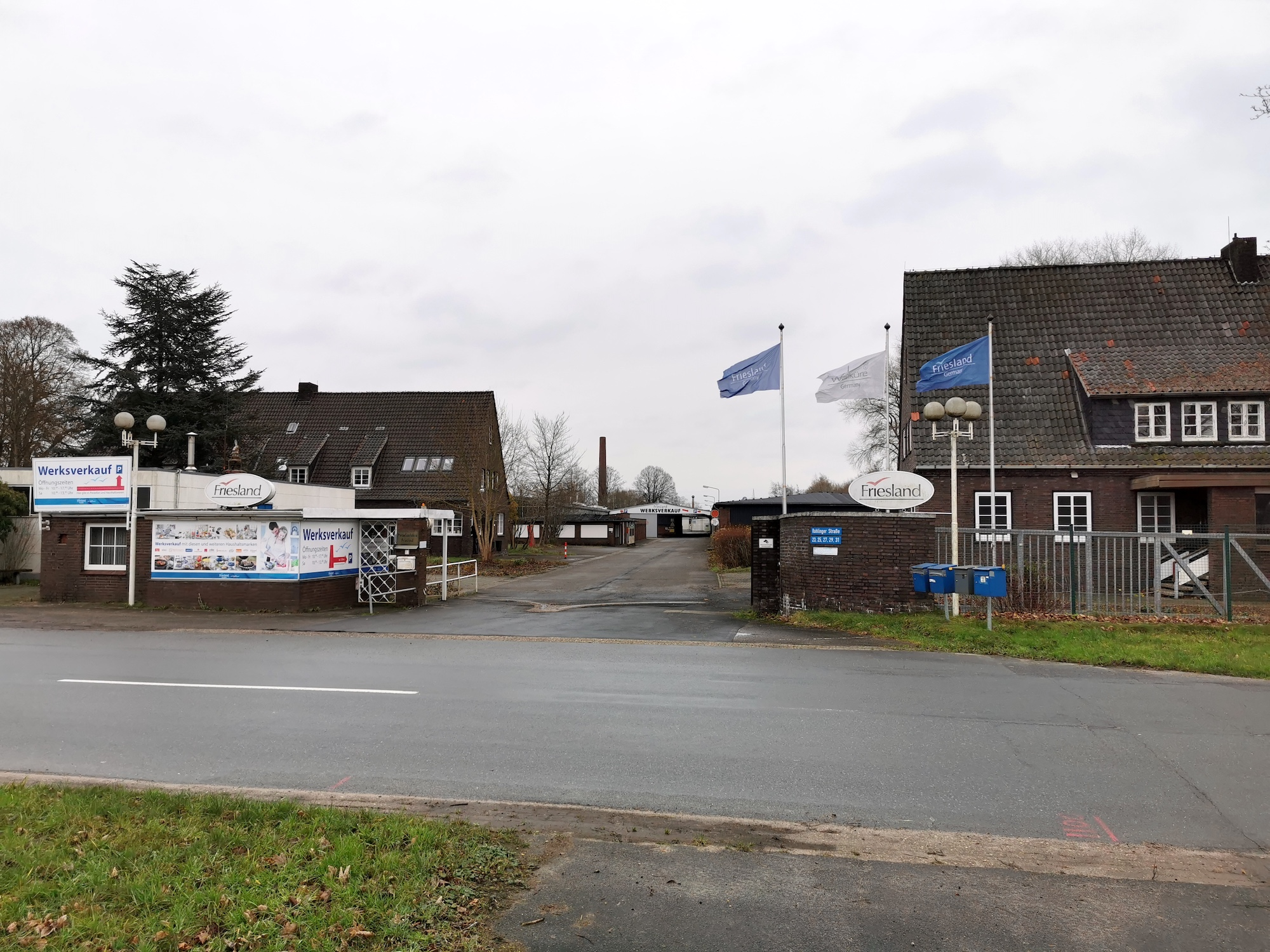
Entry to Friesland porcelain factory in Rahling (Varel)

Apken concentrated the production on 17 series, including some with a long tradition, some of which are produced with new glazes and decorations. The company is also breaking new ground, for example by combining Friesland porcelain with other materials - such as walnut or maple wood - to create a tea service. A large part of the production is done by hand.

The Melitta filters were still part of the range, with an annual number of around 50000 units (as of 2014). Coffee filters were Friesland's (first and) last product featuring the "Melitta" logo, but when Melitta started to produce a new variant of their coffee filters in China in 2018, Friesland switched to produce a slightly modified version of their former coffee filters under their own Friesland label.

The company's unique selling point, however, is the use of the particularly durable Ceracron, a mass of earthenware and stoneware developed in the 1970s. Friesland Porzellan owns the brand name Ceracron. Furthermore, Friesland is the only factory in Germany that produces porcelain and earthenware under one roof. Since 2014, the company has been using a 3D printer to produce equipment for plaster molds needed for casting porcelain.

The coffee and dinner services are sold in large department stores such as KaDeWe, Karstadt and Galeria Kaufhof, and in parallel online.

Numerous products are now in the inventory of domestic and foreign design museums, including the Berlin Museum of Decorative Arts, the Grassi Museum, Leipzig, and the Victoria and Albert Museum, London, and have been shown at international design exhibitions, for example at the Museum für Gestaltung, Zürich.

On 10 July 2018, less than a month before Apken's death, the management initially announced that it would cease operations in Rahling on 31 March 2019 due to ever-increasing costs for raw materials and the stiff competition from Asia for a company producing only "Made in Germany". However, interims-management was taken over by his widow Jutta Over-Apken on 15 October 2018 and ultimately the closure could be averted. At the beginning of 2019, the management announced that Friesland Porzellanfabrik GmbH & Co KG had merged with the Royal Goedewaagen Group, based in Nieuw-Buinen, Drenthe province, Netherlands, to form the RGW Friesland Porzellan Group and, under the lead of Righard Aldert Atsma since 22 January 2019, that the site would remain one of four sites of the new company.

In early 2020, Friesland secured the rights to the "Walküre" ('Valkyrie') brand, several product series, some forms and machines from the insolvent Bayreuth-based Porzellanfabrik Walküre. The aim was to strengthen their own position in the hotel and catering industry. Some of the former Walküre products, including the Karlsbad and Bayreuth coffee makers, were since manufactured at the Varel factory using the porcelain mark "FPM". (Note: The porcelain mark "FPM" stands for Friesland Porzellan-Manufaktur and was chosen as a play on words on the porcelain mark "SPM" (for 'Siegmund Paul Meyer') previously used by the porcelan manufacturer Walküre Porzellanfabrik.) A new high-tech decor center utilizing machines from Walküre's former Bayreuth site was scheduled to be opened at the Varel site in May 2023. Half a million euro were invested into the modernization of the heat distribution system, exhaust systems and the main oven.

In 2021, the Royal Goedewaagen Group became the Bornego Group, holding brands like Royal Goedewaagen (Niew-Buinen, Netherlands, founded in 1610), Royal Boch (Antwerp, Belgium, founded in 1841), Albarello tegelfabriek & atelier / Dijkstra Friese Kleiwarenfabriek (Sneek, Netherlands, founded in 1898) and Royal Tableware (Amsterdam, Netherlands, founded in 2019) besides the Friesland Prozellan and Walküre brands (Varel, Germany).

On the night of 29 June 2023 to 30 June 2023, seven warehouses on the Friesland Porzellan factory premises and production machines were completely destroyed by a major fire. Almost all employees were subsequently laid off. Clean-up work began in mid-November 2023, with the 12 ha production site now pending its reconstruction.

== Trivia ==
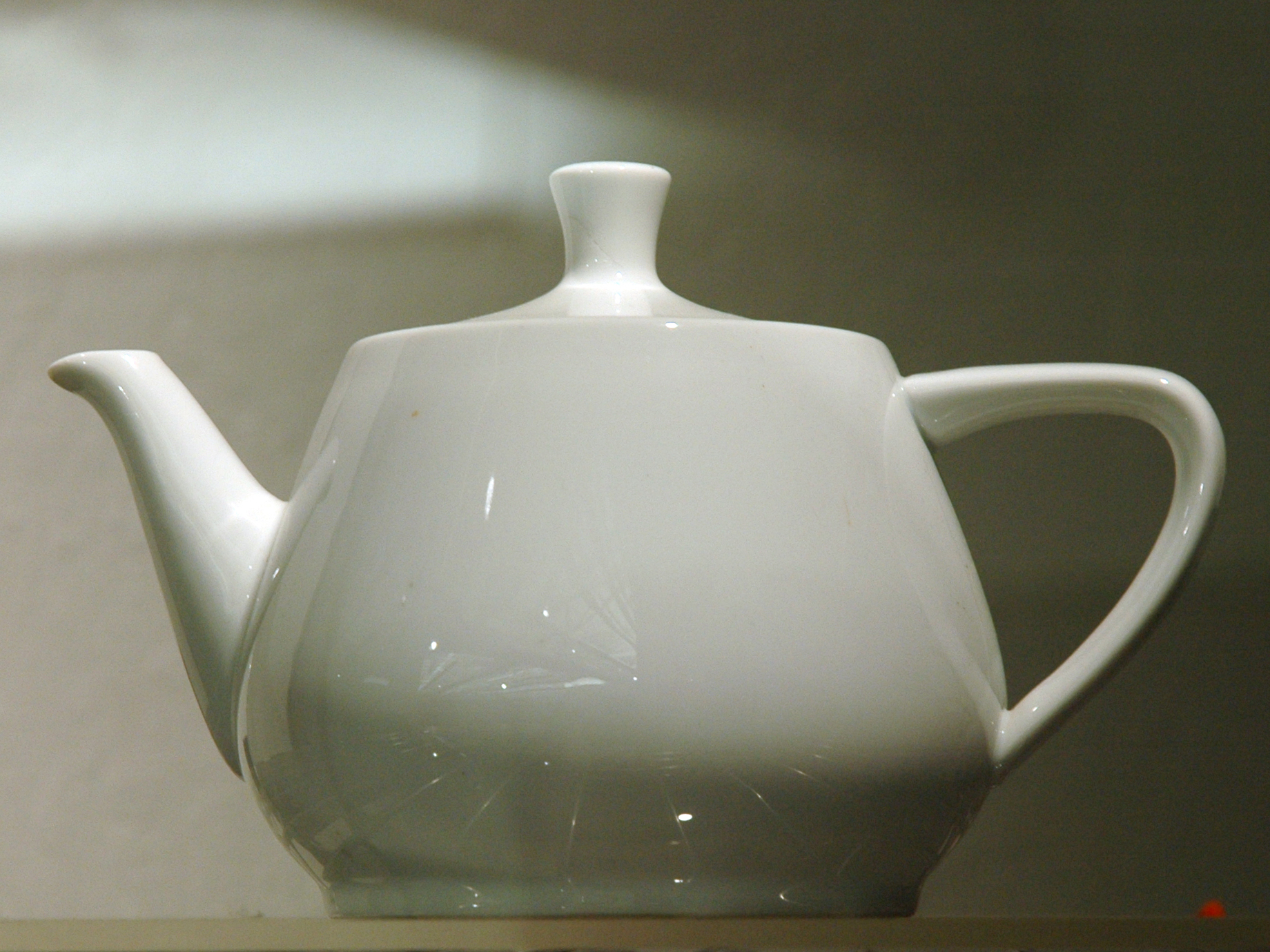
Original Utah Teapot in the Computer History Museum in Mountain View

A well-known product of the Friesland porcelain factory is the so-called Utah Teapot. In the 1970s, a white Melitta porcelain pot designed by Lieselotte Kantner provided the model for one of the first three-dimensional computer animations, which was shown in various animated films such as The Simpsons and Toy Story as well as in the Windows 98 screen saver Pipes. The original pot has been on display in the Computer History Museum (USA) since 1990. The company only became aware of this fact in 2017 through a customer's request and subsequently changed the name of the teapot from "household teapot" (Haushaltsteekanne) to "Utah Teapot".

== Products ==
The company launched more than 75 different coffee and dining services with more than 760 decors and colors (as of 2007). The company's most famous designs include:

- 1954: Coffee filter 102 (elsewhere since 1932)
- Tea filter 401 (since 19??)
- 1954: Coffee pot (form 0), designed by Jupp Ernst
- 1956: Coffee pot Minden (form 1), originally in pastel colors
- 1956: Milk pots and mugs (form 2)
- 195?: Service Friesland (form 3)
- 1960: Service Zürich (form 5), designed by Jupp Ernst
- 1961: Service Ascona (form 4), designed by Jupp Ernst
- 1961: Service Salzburg (form 6), service Stockholm (form 7), designed by Lieselotte Kantner
- 1962: Service Hamburg (form 20), designed by Lieselotte Kantner
- 1963: Service Paris (form 21), designed by Jupp Ernst
- 1963: Service Wien (form 22), designed by Lieselotte Kantner
- 1964: Service Oslo (form 23), designed by Lieselotte Kantner
- 1965: Service Bangkok (form 24?)
- 1965: Service Kopenhagen (form 25), designed by Lieselotte Kantner
- 1968: Service Amsterdam (form 26)
- 1968: Service Budapest (form 29), designed by Axel Wolfgang Werner
- 1969: Service Bremen (form 27), design Heidelberg (form 48), designed by Lieselotte Kantner
- 1970: Service Berlin (form 57), service Helsinki, designed by Lieselotte Kantner
- 1973: Service Lindau (form 58), designed by Lieselotte Kantner
- 1974: Service Bückeburg (form 49), service Holstein (form 69), designed by Lieselotte Kantner
- 1975: Service Jeverland (form 59), designed by Lieselotte Kantner
- 1976: Ceracron service Ammerland (form 63), designed by Anne Mentzel-Marx
- 1978: Service Lugano, designed by Lieselotte Kantner
- 1978: Ceracron Katen-Geschirr (form 17), designed by Bodo Mans
- 1979: Ceracron service Bambus (form 64), service Jadeborg, designed by Hanns Welling
- 1981: Service Anno 1900
- 1981: Rice corn form 66/Boutique, designed by Hanns Welling
- 1981: Ceracron tea service Zen (form 62), designed by Luigi Colani (1974)
- 1982: Service Schloss Gödens (form 50), designed by Hanns Welling
- 1983: Service Life (form 50 or 51) / Life Revival (form 51 or 54), designed by Lutz Rabold (1973)
- 1986: Service Mondo (form 53), designed by Christoph Hasenberg
- 1987: Service Kröning, designed by Anne Mentzel-Marx
- 1990: Service HappyMix, designed by Lieselotte Kantner
- 1992: Service Venice (form 52), designed by Lucilla Cionini
- 1994: Service Ecco, designed by Ulrike and Detlef Rahe
- 2002 & 2017: Service Horizont (form 51?), designed by Volker Hundertmark
- 2003: Service Enjoy (form 24?), designed by Odo Klose
- 2008: Tea service Chai, designed by Jannis Ellenberger

== Awards ==
Numerous of the company's designs have received design awards, including:

- Coffee service Stockholm, Die gute Industrieform (Hannover 1962)
- Coffee service Hamburg, Die gute Industrieform (Hannover 1963)
- Coffee service Wien, Die gute Industrieform (Hannover 1964)
- Porcelain coffee service Hamburg, Die gute Industrieform (Hannover 1965)
- Earthenware coffee service Kopenhagen, Die gute Industrieform (Hannover 1967)
- Coffee and table service Berlin, decor Havel, iF Design Award 1972
- Table service Stockholm, decor Värmland, iF Design Award 1973
- Table service Kopenhagen, decor Boulevard, iF Design Award 1976
- Coffee service Life (modern name Life Revival), Design Plus Award 1984
- Coffee and table service, Ecco, designed by Rahe & Rahe, iF Design Award 1995

== See also ==
- Porcelain manufacturing companies in Europe
- Schlossmuseum Jever (huge collection of Melitta & Friesland porcelain 1954–2007)
