= Coffeemaker =

Cooking appliance used to brew coffee

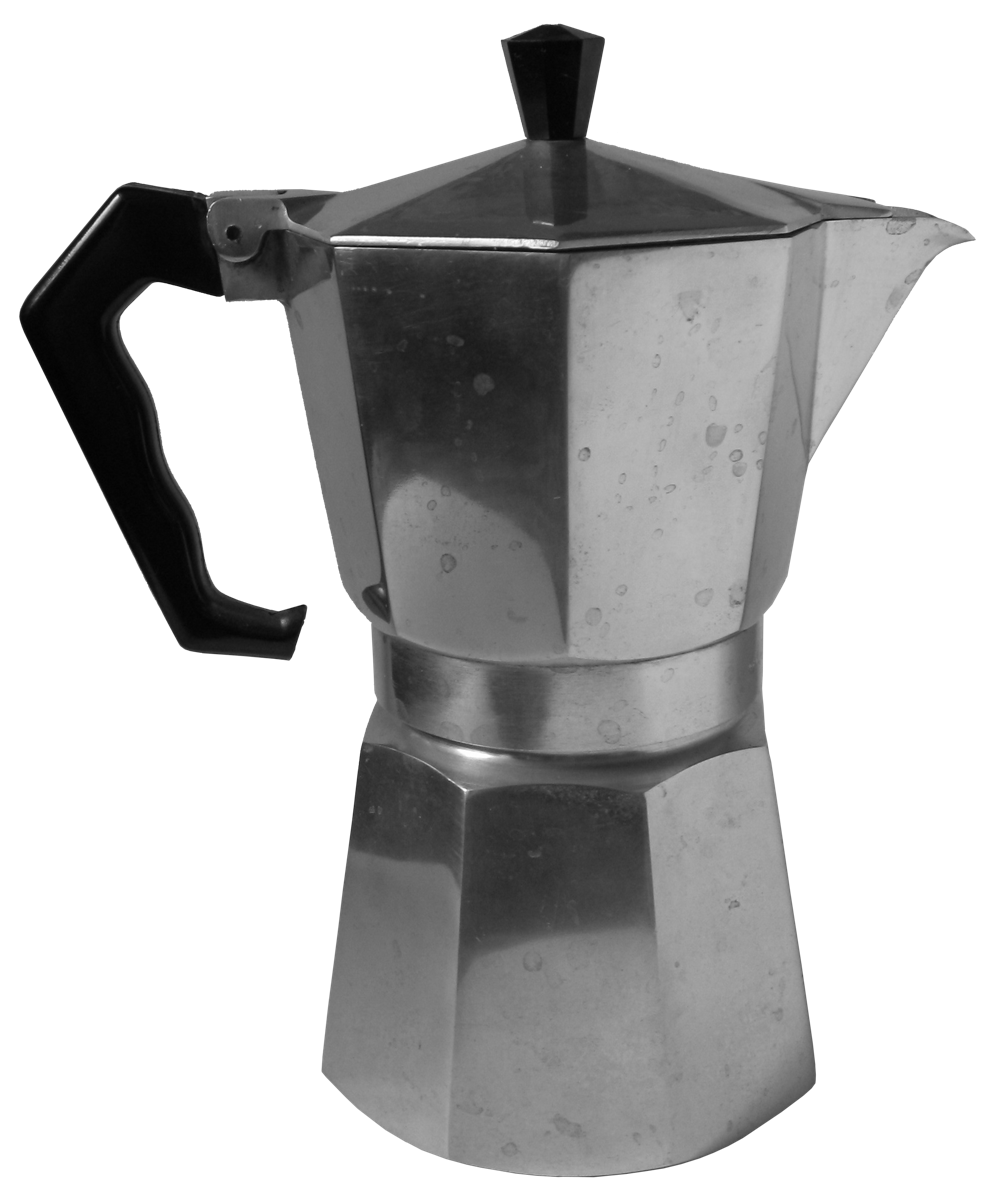
A stove-top, Italian style coffee maker

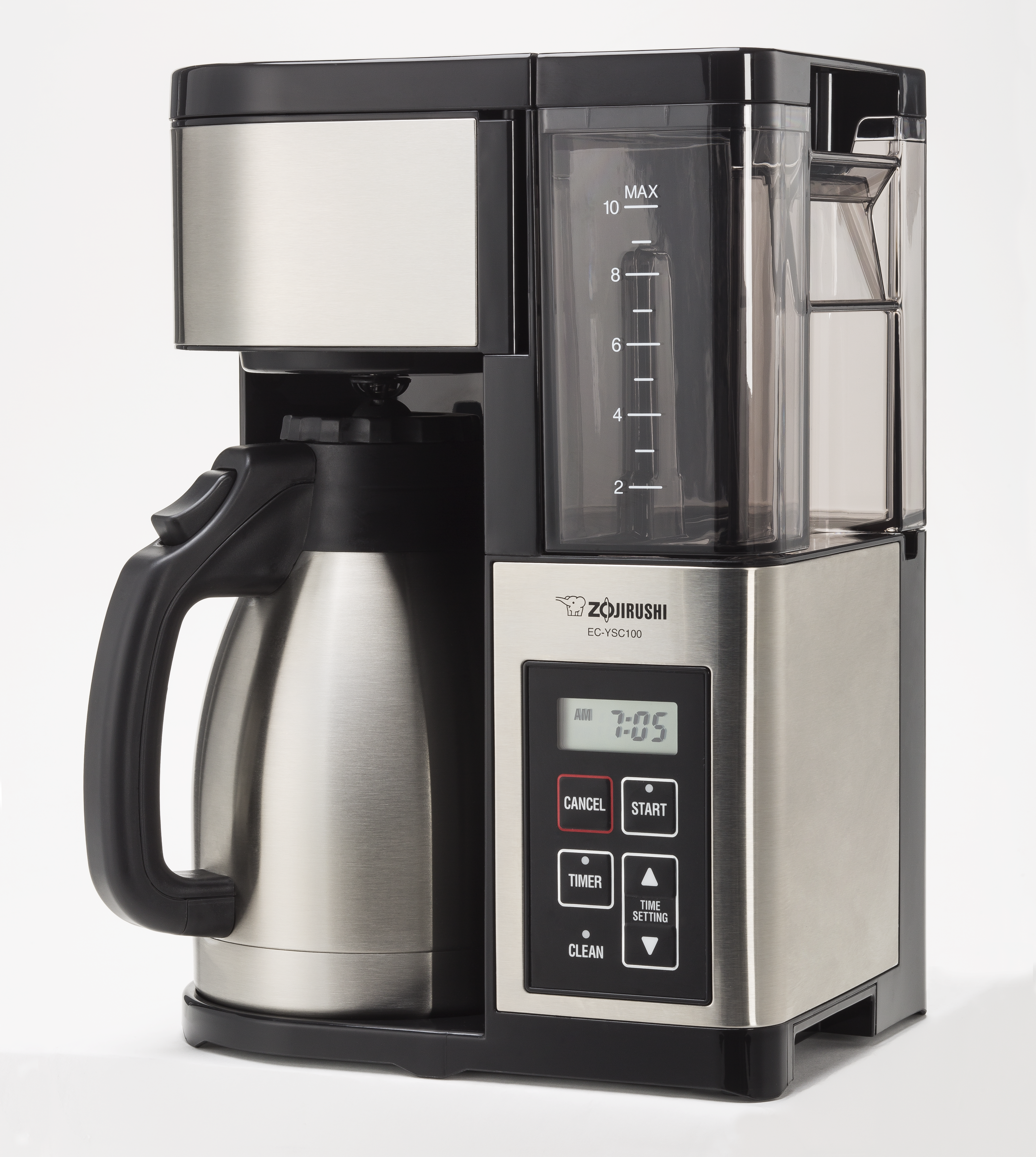
A 2016-model electric coffeemaker

A coffeemaker, coffee maker or coffee machine is a cooking appliance used to brew coffee. While there are many different types of coffeemakers, the two most common brewing principles use gravity or pressure to move hot water through coffee grounds. In the most common devices, coffee grounds are placed into a paper or metal filter inside a funnel, which is set over a glass or ceramic coffee pot, a cooking pot in the kettle family. Cold water is poured into a separate chamber, which is then boiled and directed into the funnel and allowed to drip through the grounds under gravity. This is also called automatic drip-brew. Coffee makers that use pressure to force water through ground coffee are called espresso makers, and they produce espresso coffee.

== Types ==
=== Drip coffeemaker ===
The first non-electric drip coffee maker, using notebook paper as the precursor to the paper coffee filter, was developed by German entrepreneur Melitta Bentz in 1908. The same year, she founded the Melitta brand, specializing in coffee and coffee-making products.

=== Vacuum brewers ===
On 27 August 1930, Inez H. Peirce of Chicago, Illinois, filed her patent for the first vacuum coffee maker that truly automated the vacuum brewing process, while eliminating the need for a stovetop burner or liquid fuels.

=== Cafetière ===
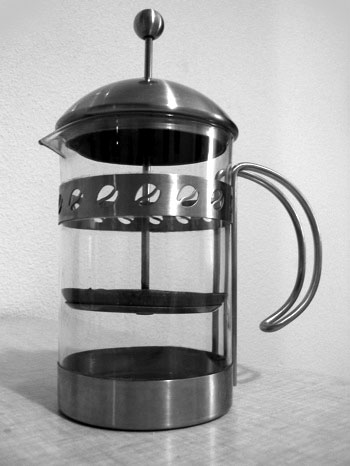
A cafetiere coffeemaker

A cafetière (coffee plunger, French press in US English) requires coffee of a coarser grind than does a drip-brew coffee filter, as finer grounds will seep through the press filter and into the drink.

Because the coffee grounds remain in direct contact with the brewing water and the grounds are filtered from the water via a mesh instead of a paper filter, coffee brewed with the cafetière captures more of the coffee's flavour and essential oils, which would become trapped in a traditional drip-brew machine's paper filters. As with drip-brewed coffee, cafetière coffee can be brewed to any strength by adjusting the amount of ground coffee which is brewed. If the used grounds remain in the drink after brewing, French-pressed coffee left to stand can become "bitter", though this is an effect that many users of cafetière consider beneficial. For an 0.5-litre (17 US fl oz) cafetière, the contents are considered spoiled, by some reports, after around 20 minutes.

=== Single-serve coffeemaker ===
A single-serve or single-cup coffeemaker brews coffee from a single-serve container, with several popular variations existing. These gained popularity in the 2000s.

== See also ==
- Arndt'sche Caffee-Aufgussmaschine (including Quedlinburg Kaffee-Aufguss-Maschine) – manual coffee makers
- Benjamin Thompson - inventor of a drip coffeepot
- Coffee biggin – French manual coffee maker
- Büttner filter and Bauscher filter – manual coffee and moka makers utilizing a special type of permanent porcelain filter
- Caffè crema
- Cezve
- Coffee cup
- Coffee percolator
- Coffee pod
- Coffee preparation
- Coffee vending machine
- Coffeepot (François-Thomas Germain)
- French drip coffee pot (including Cafetière du Belloy and Drip-O-lator) – manual coffee makers utilizing various kinds of permanent filters with round holes
- Grègue (café grègue, café coulé) – manual coffee makers
- ISSpresso – the first espresso coffee machine designed for use in space
- Jebena
- Karlsbad coffee maker (including Bohemian coffee pot, Bayreuth coffee maker, and Walküre Aroma-pot) – manual coffee makers utilizing a double-slotted permanent filter of glazed porcelain
- Moka pot – a manual moka maker
- Neapolitan flip coffee pot (and variants like the Russian egg, Potsdam boiler, or the Arndt'sche Sturzmaschine) – manual coffee makers
- Trojan Room coffee pot
