= Karlsbad-style coffee maker =

Type of porcelain drip coffee maker

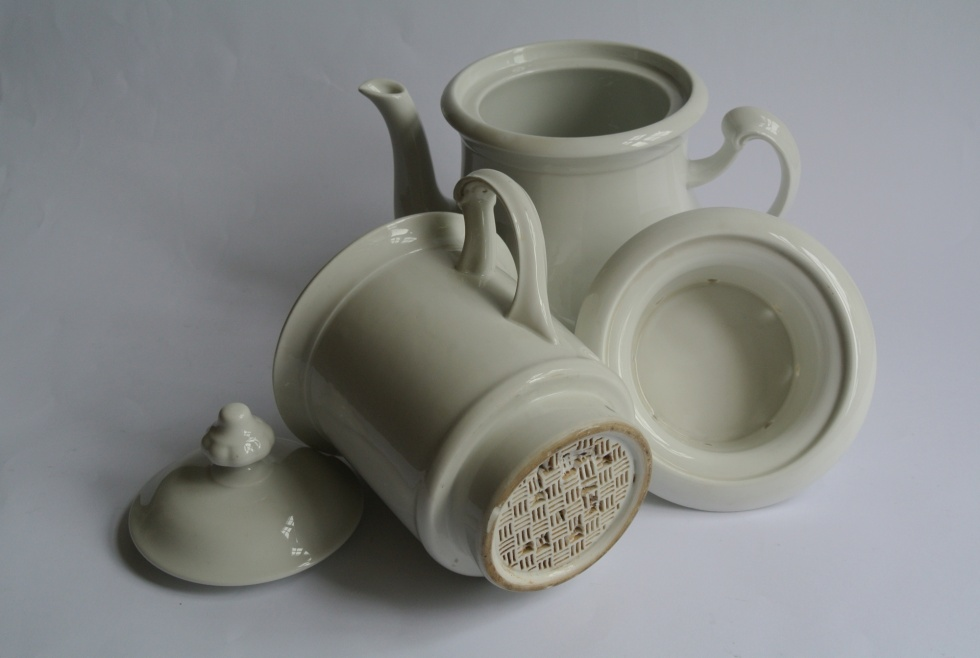
Karlsbad coffee maker by SPM/Walküre (form 599/0 without rills), consisting of coffee pot, double-layered conical cross-slit filter made from through-glazed porcelain (here broken), water spreader and lid

A variant of the category of French drip coffee pots is the group of so-called Bohemian coffee pots, manual zero-bypass flat bottom coffee makers made out of porcelain only, including Karlsbad coffee makers (1878), (Note: In Germany (Deutsches Kaiserreich), the first public patent office (Kaiserliches Patentamt in Berlin) opened on 1 July 1877, replacing various local small state patent regulations. Just a few months later, the K. K. Priv. Graf Oswald von Thun'sche Porcellanfabrik filed their patent 3105 on the manufacturing of conically cross-slit through-glazed porcelain coffee filters on 5 April 1878. Given that patents were still very new, it is possible that such filters had been produced for a couple of years earlier already. When other manufacturers later produced similar coffee makers, Thun advertised their coffee makers as the original Karlsbad coffee makers, suggesting that they were actually the first to manufacture them. In Austria (K.&K. Monarchie Österreich-Ungarn), the first patent office opened in 1899, replacing various forms of privileges since 1794.) Bayreuth coffee makers (2007), (Note: Before the introduction of the so-called Bayreuth coffee maker "form 699" in 2007, Walküre sometimes also called the older "form 599" coffee maker Bayreuther Kaffeemaschine or just Porzellan-Kaffeemaschine ('porcelain coffee maker').) the Walküre cup filter (2010) and the Walküre aroma-pot (2015). (Note: Around 2017, a Karlsbad-style conically cross-slit through-glazed porcelain strainer insert was also available for Walküre's teapot Thea (forms 890 and 899).) In contrast to French drip coffee pots, they all use a special double-layered conically cross-slit strainer made from through-glazed porcelain as well as a water spreader with six (or, in the larger models, more) large round holes (Note: Porcelain manufacturer Siegmund Paul Meyer (SPM), based in Bayreuth, Germany, originally referred to the two different types of filters as Berliner Kaffeetrichter mit Karlsbader Seiher, geschlitzt oder nach französischer Art gebohrt. ('Berlin coffee-cone with slit Karlsbad strainer or drilled according to the French method.') indicating that the main difference between French drip coffee pots and Karlsbad-style coffee makers is the special construction and material of the double-layered conically cross-slit through-glazed porcelain filter, not the general shape of the device, and also that Karlsbad-style filters were not invented by SPM in 1910, but were already known in the area of Karlsbad. Nevertheless, Walküre, the successor of SPM, claimed that the pear-shaped form (form 599) of the Karlsbad coffee maker is their original factory design.) to ensure an even water distribution and reduce the agitation of the coffee bed, a method sometimes also called cake filtration. In particular before World War I, but still up to the advent of the Espresso machine in the 1950s, they were very popular in the Viennese coffee house culture. The special kind of drip coffee they produce is called a Karlsbader ('Karlsbad coffee'). (Note: Historically, three types of coffee appear to have been referred to as Karlsbader ('Karlsbad coffee'). The first one was a filtered drip coffee with so-called Karlsbader Kaffeegewürz ('Karlsbad coffee spices'), then offered by various companies like Otto E. Weber, Heinrich Franck & Söhne (Kagold), Andre Hofer, Gebrüder Bernhard, Kaiser's Kaffee and others, the second one a drip coffee prepared in a Karlsbad coffee maker, and the third one a combination of both. At least in Vienna, coffee, including Karlsbad coffee, appears to have been traditionally served with a slight amount of fig coffee added.) In Vienna, the Kleiner Schwarzer (confusingly also called Mokka or Piccolo), a black coffee without milk or sugar, was often prepared in Karlsbad coffee makers as well, hence they were sometimes incorrectly also called Vienna coffee-making machines. (Note: Some historical English sources incorrectly used the term Vienna coffee maker to refer to Karlsbad coffee makers. However, the term (unglaubliche) Wiener Kaffeemaschine usually refers to an unrelated steam-pressure coffee maker called Wiener Fontäne ('Vienna fountain') or Vienna Incomparabile.) Once manufactured by many porcelain manufacturers, demand gradually dropped and eventually production stopped when electrical coffee makers became more and more common, so that Karlsbad coffee makers were only available on the used market for a couple of decades. However, experiencing a renaissance since about the millennium as part of the so-called third-wave of coffee one manufacturer restarted production of them. They are also used in restaurants and by connoisseurs, coffee sommeliers, coffee roasters and in coffee tasting laboratories.

== History ==
As a product of the fin de siècle the original so-called Karlsbader Kaffeemaschine ('Karlsbad coffee maker') was invented by Oswald von Thun und Hohenstein's factory Thun'sche Porzellanfabrik of Klösterle an der Eger (now Klášterec nad Ohří) near Karlsbad (now Karlovy Vary), which patented a special cross-slit filter sieve in 1878. Producing lithophanes, the company, which was founded in 1793/1794, already had experience manufacturing very thin and fragile porcelain for decades.

Karlsbad coffee makers were historically manufactured by many porcelain manufacturers including Porcelánka Thun (with porcelain mark "TK") (Karlsbad), Altrohlauer Porzellan-Fabriken AG vorm. Moritz Zdekauer ("M Z") (Altrohlau), Erste Porzellan-Industrie A.G. ("EPIAG D. F.") (Dallwitz), Haas & Czjzek ("H. & C.") (Schlaggenwald), Carl Tielsch ("C. T.") (Altwasser), J. S. Maier & Co. Poschetzau ("MCP") (Poschetzau), Max Roesler Feinsteingutfabrik (Rodach, Germany), Hutschenreuther (Selb / Bavaria, Germany), Rosenthal & Co. ("R. C.") (Bavaria, Germany) / Rosenthal (Weiden/Kronach, Germany), Bauscher (Weiden, Germany), Meißner Ofen- und Porzellanfabrik vorm. Carl Teichert ("MEISSEN") (Meißen, Germany), (Note: The Meißner Ofen- und Porzellanfabrik vorm. Carl Teichert of Meißen, Germany must not be confused with the famous Staatliche Porzellanmanufaktur Meißen.) Villeroy & Boch ("V. B.") (Luxemburg), (Note: While the ceramic Kaffee-Aufgussmaschine manufactured by Villeroy & Boch for the coffee roaster Max Thürmer of Dresden, Germany since at least 1903 featured a very coarse double-layered cross-slit sieve made out of ceramics similar to those found in Karlsbad-style coffee makers, which use a finer double-layered conically cross-slit strainer made from through-glazed porcelain, the Thürmer coffee makers featured a valving mechanism and combined steeping with drip-brewing. Enameled and tin variants of the Thürmer coffee makers as well as earlier ceramic versions still used a filter with about a hundred small drilled round holes.) Fayencerie Sarreguemines (France), Pillivuyt (France), and Siegmund Paul Meyer ("SPM") / Walküre (Bayreuth, Germany) / Friesland ("FPM") (Varel, Germany).

Karlsbad coffee makers consist of four parts (a coffee pot, a coffee strainer/filter, a water spreader/distributor, and a lid) all made out of porcelain, and they exist in a number of different shapes of unknown origin. The original shape appears to have been a cylindrical filter with two squarish handles combined with a ball-shaped pot. Another early style featured a somewhat trapezoid shape known as neukonisch ('neoconic').

In 1910, SPM incorporated the slit Karlsbad filter into the design of a coffee maker with cylindrical filter (form 523). In 1913, SPM introduced the now classical somewhat pear-shaped rounded form (form 599). This design was copied by other porcelain manufacturers. Over the years it was available in various sizes ranging from 250 ml to 2.25 litre.

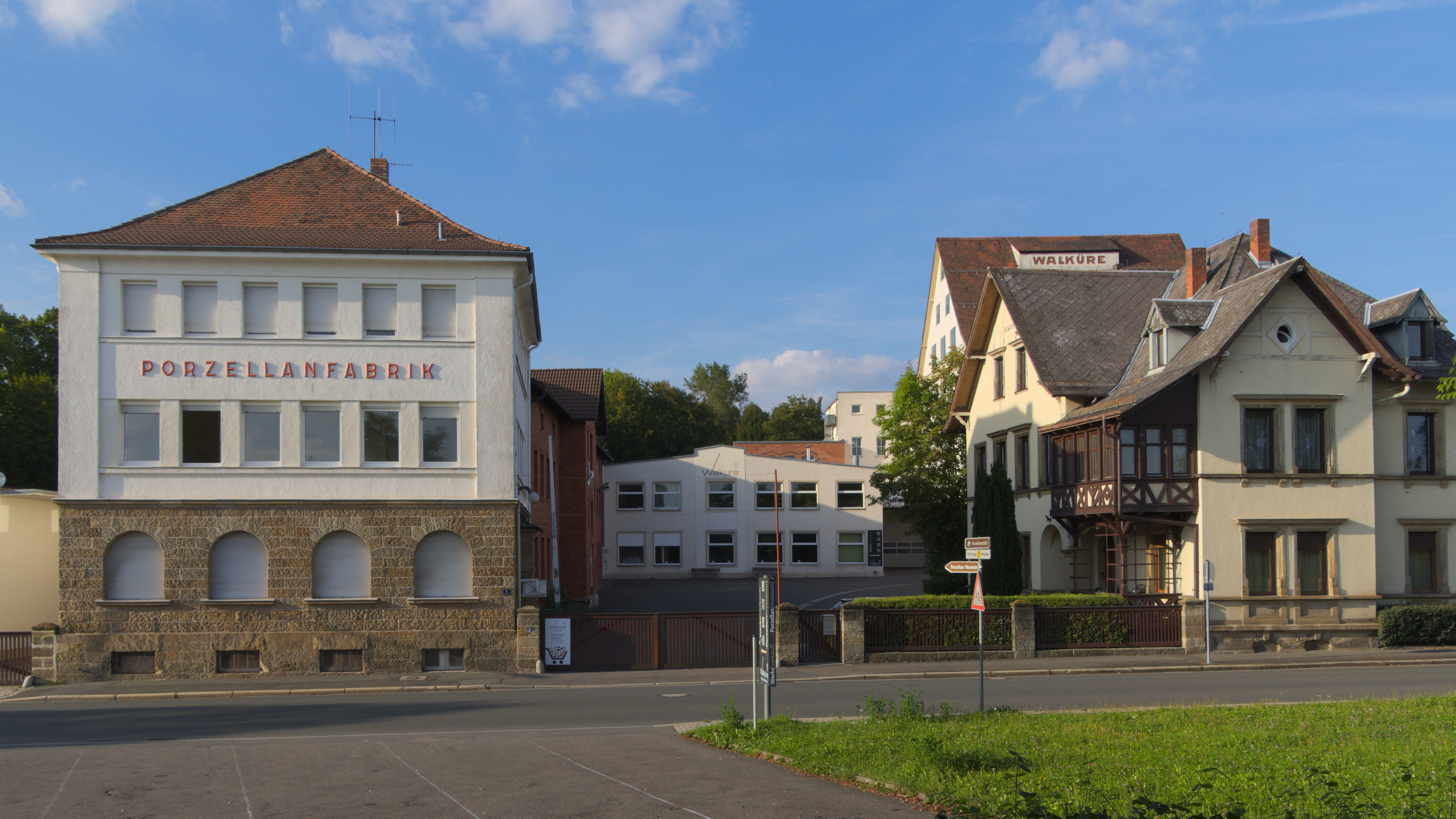
Porzellanfabrik Walküre at Gravenreutherstraße in Bayreuth, Germany (2014)

In 2007, the so-called Bayreuth coffee makers were created by designer Daniel Eltner for Walküre. A somewhat Bauhaus-reminiscing slick modernized style (form 699) following the same general four-piece porcelain construction principles as traditional Karlsbad coffee makers, the design received the "Good Design Award 2008" of the Chicago Athenaeum Museum of Architecture and Design and the "Coffee Innovations Award 2008" in the category "coffee machines and mills" at the domotechnica fair in Cologne. However, due to its non-symmetrical design it may be difficult to handle for left-handers. It has been available in two sizes (350 ml and 700 ml) produced by Walküre up to 2019, and since 2020 by Friesland (400 ml and 700 ml).

As of 2020, Friesland was the only remaining manufacturer of any of them; however, their Varel production site burnt down in a fire on 29 June 2023, now pending its reconstruction.

== Preparation ==
To avoid clogging, coarsely ground coffee with about salt- or sugar-sized grains (about semolina-grade), evenly ground and without fines or added coffee surrogates, has to be used. Walküre recommended to use coffea arabica, and either 16 g for the first two cups and 6 g for each further cup, or 8–10 g per cup in general.

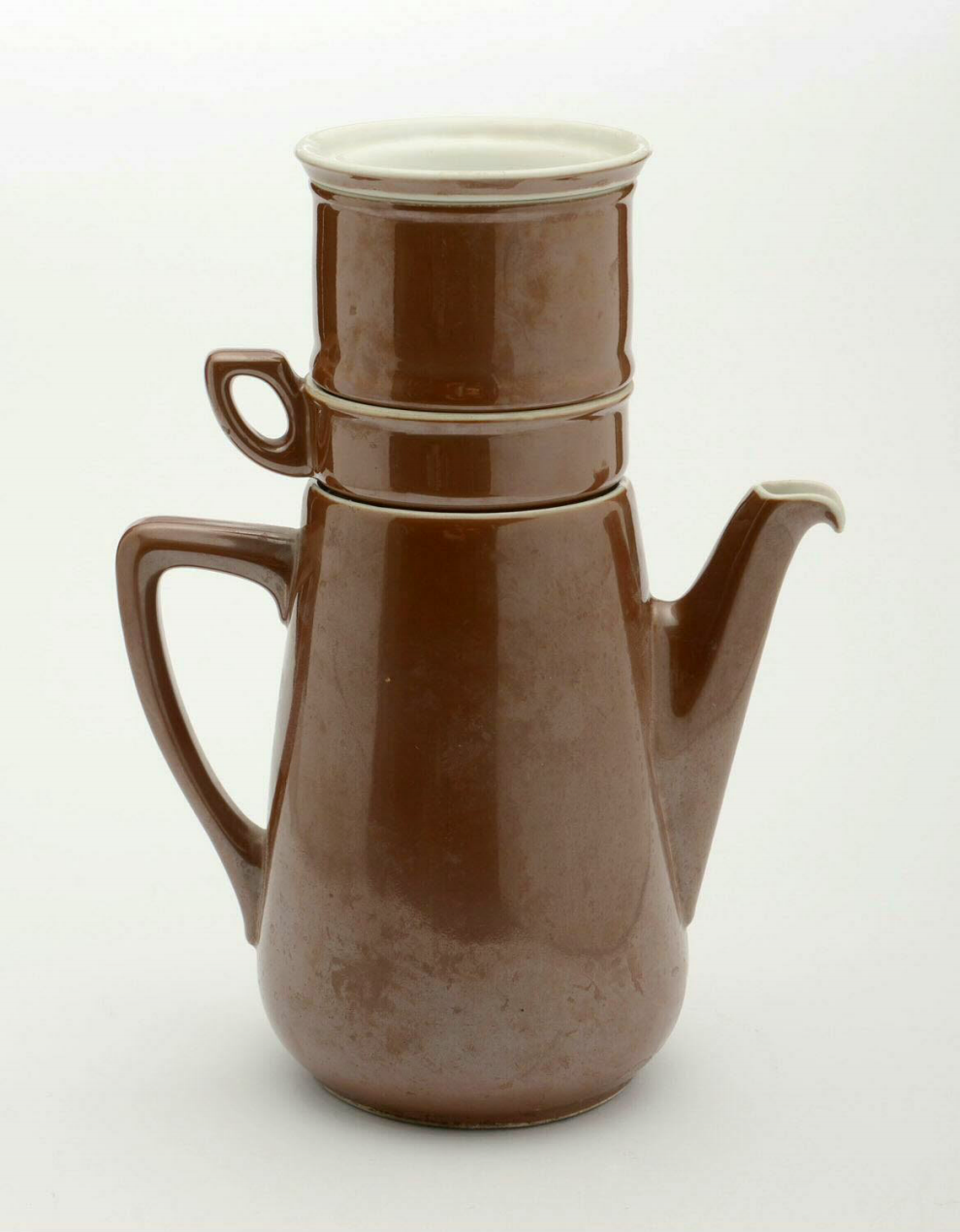
Early SPM/Walküre coffee pot (separate lid not shown) with drip-free spout (form 604P?). Pictured with three-piece coffee filter (form 629?) consisting of an optional funnel (with handle) for use as a cup filter, a Karlsbad-style filter sieve (available with or without handle) and a water spreader, c. 1929–1942. The parts were available in different sizes in white and brown.

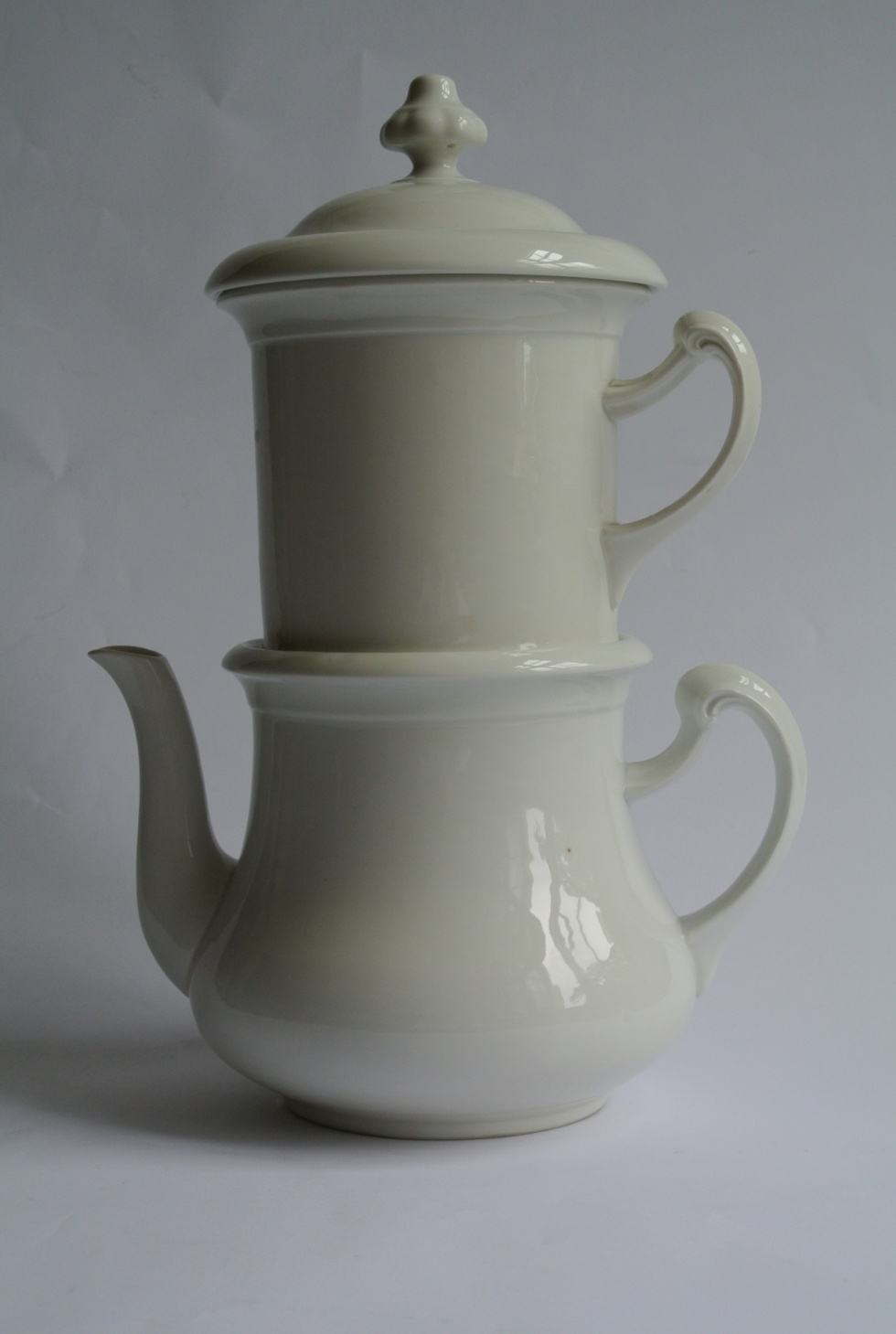
Four-piece Karlsbad coffee maker by SPM/Walküre, form 599/0 without rills, total height 36 cm, c. 1913–1942

== Similar coffee makers ==
In the 1880s, Max Thürmer, a coffee roaster of Dresden, Germany, founded in 1879, advertised Karlsbad coffee and somewhat later also coffee makers (of unknown type) in various newspapers. In the early 1900s, he marketed his own invention of a manual coffee maker (the so-called Kaffeeaufgußkanne Max Thürmer), which, from its outer appearance, looked quite similar to cylindrical Karlsbad coffee makers but featured an air-tight joint (through a lid with a thin film of water) between the permanent filter part and the coffee pot below, and it came with a manual valving mechanism (by closing the spout of the coffee pot) to combine steeping (full immersion) with drip-filtering (percolation). The devices were manufactured by Villeroy & Boch for him. While the permanent filter in early of his devices still featured round drilled holes like in French drip coffee makers, later units used a double-layered cross-slit filter construction similar to that found in Karlsbad coffee makers, but deliberately with a much coarser grid, with a large air gap between the layers, and using ceramics instead of porcelain.

Around 1900, the Staatliche Porzellanmanufaktur Meißen of Meißen, Germany, manufactured cup filters utilizing a double-layered radially slit porcelain filter construction much coarser than in Karlsbad coffee makers.

Since 1926, the idea to combine steeping with drip-filtering was also utilized by Berlin-based coffee roaster Carl Artur Büttner in his invention of a manual coffee maker. While his construction was considerably different, it also featured a valving mechanism (through a rotatable saucer), a through-glazed porcelain filter with triangularly-arranged slits and with an air space below. These so-called "System Büttner" coffee makers were available up into, at least, the 1940s as stand-alone devices for home use, but were also adopted by various other German coffee roasters as part of larger coffee machines produced by the porcelain manufacturer Bauscher for heavy-duty batch use in restaurants and canteens.

Since c. 1952 (and up into the 1970s) the Neuerer Porzellanfabrik in Oberkotzau, Germany, the successor of Porzellanfabrik Greiner & Herda, manufactured coffee percolators named Aromator, which featured double-layered cross-slit porcelain filters similar to those used in Karlsbad coffee makers, and thus not requiring any paper filter rings.

Modern manual coffee makers sometimes associated with Karlsbad-style coffee makers include Coffee Consulate's intense extraction cup filter RS16 GlasFilter by Steffen Schwarz (2015) (Note: The 2015 Coffee Consulate RS16 GlasFilter paperless cup filter uses a sieve pattern of rotationally symmetric circles of interrupted slits similar to that used found in the Melitta plastic cup filter produced in the 1970s for Melitta 1a paper filter discs.) and the borosilicate carafe coffee maker "The Pure Over" by glass artist Etai Rahmil (2020). However, whilst they are zero-bypass flat-bottom French drip coffee pots with permanent filters, they too cannot be counted as Karlsbad-style coffee makers because they do not feature a cross-slit double-layered filter sieve and also because they are not made out of porcelain.

== See also ==
- Coffeemaker
- List of coffee drinks
- Porcelain museum of Klášterec nad Ohří

== Notes ==
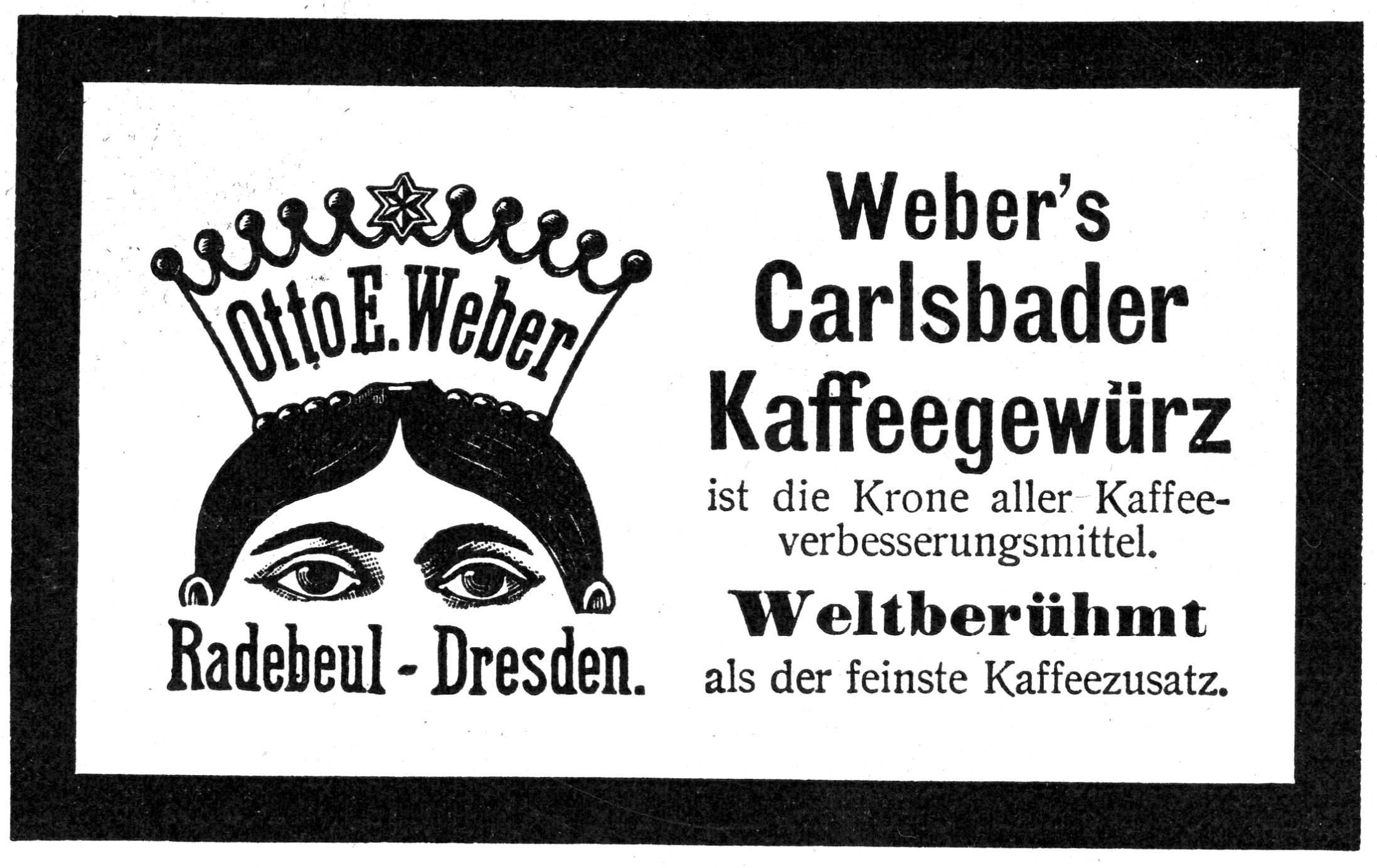
Weber's Carlsbader Kaffeegewürz

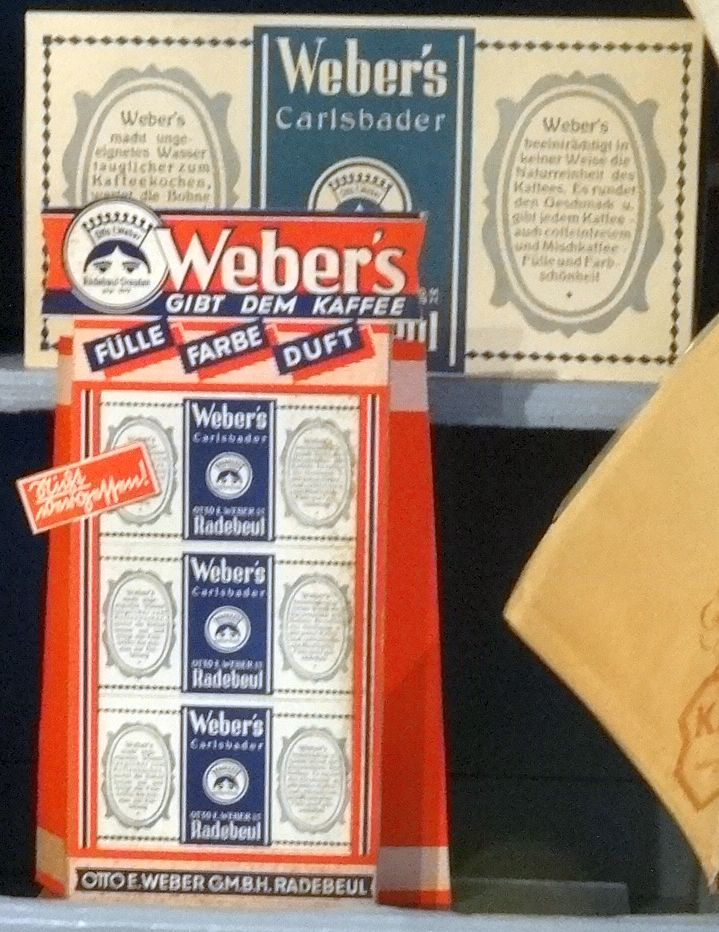
Weber's Carlsbader Kaffeegewürz
