= System Büttner coffee maker =

Coffee maker combining steeping with drip-filtering

"System Büttner" coffee makers (German: Büttner-Kaffeemaschine) have been a type of manual and semi-automatic coffee makers combining coffee steeping (infusion, full immersion) with drip-filtering (percolation).

== Overview ==
The idea to combine steeping with drip-filtering was utilized by the Berlin-based coffee roaster Carl Artur Büttner (also written as Carl Arthur Büttner) (Note: The original company was founded in 1903 by Hugo Büttner (sen.) in Halberstadt, Germany. In 1919, his brother Wilhelm "Willi" Büttner joined the company forming Gebrüder Büttner. Carl Artur Büttner (aka Carl Arthur Büttner), a relative, founded an independent Berlin-based subsidiary of the company in December 1925. It was located at Wittenbergplatz, Bayreuther Straße 34 in Berlin. In 1933, Rolf Büttner founded another subsidiary in Halle, Germany. The company C. A. Büttner OHG was founded in 1934. During World War II, the company site in Halberstadt was destroyed in a bombing raid in 1945. The Büttner Kaffee-Handelsgesellschaft mbH (now located in the Western part of Berlin) filed for insolvency in 1961 after the erection of the Berlin Wall and was taken over by the Bremen-based Gebrüder Westhoff Kaffeerösterei between 1968 and 1974. In 1965, the Halle-based business was dissolved when Rolf Büttner joined his brother Hugo Büttner (jun.) trying to rebuild their father's company site in Halberstadt, however, Hugo Büttner (jun.) died in 1971 and the company was expropriated by the GDR in 1972.) in his 1926 invention of a manual zero-bypass flat bottom coffee maker consisting of four parts, all made out of porcelain: a filter pot (Filtergefäß / Oberteil, "O") with lid (Deckel, "D"), saucer (Ablaufteller / Unterteil, "U") and coffee pot (Kaffeekanne, "K"). The filter pot featured a through-glazed porcelain filter with triangularly-arranged slits with some air space below. The captured hot air causing mild micro-turbulences on the underside of the coffee grounds were said to help avoid clogging. Steeping was achieved utilizing a valving mechanism stopping the flow through the filter by a specially designed rotatable saucer with a single hole, which had to be positioned between the filter pot and the coffee pot so that the hole was initially closed and was manually opened when the coffee had been steeping for three to five minutes. Once released, it then took between three and six minutes for the coffee to drip through the meanwhile settled coffee bed into the coffee pot, a method sometimes also called cake filtration.

Marketed since spring 1927 and up into, at least, the 1940s, these coffee makers were available as stand-alone devices for home use, but were also adopted by various other German coffee roasters (including Maschinenfabrik Bremen (Bremen, Germany), Georg Schrader & Co. aka Geschraco (Bremen, Germany), Ferd + Eichhorn (Braunschweig, Germany), Heimbs & Sohn Co. (Braunschweig, Germany) and Columbus (Germany)) as part of larger coffee machines produced by the porcelain manufacturer Bauscher (Weiden, Germany) for heavy-duty semi-continuous batch use in restaurants and canteens. The Büttner extraction method was boldly marketed claiming to be the world's best moka and coffee filter ("Der beste Mokka- und Kaffeefilter der Welt").

The properties were said to be:

- 100% porcelain, no contact with metal, enamel, or paper impacting the taste
- Permanent filter requiring no paper filter or bags, thereby reducing costs
- Claim to have no tendency of clogging the filter sieve holes (compared to Karlsbad-style coffee makers)
- Full aroma, claimed to have up to 30% increased extraction efficiency (also called "Kaffeesparmaschine"), thereby reducing costs
- Reduced amount of oily components and caffeine in finished coffee (will be floating on top of the water column in filter pot and claimed to be filtered out by settled coffee bed, a method sometimes called cake filtration)
- Easy to clean by just washing out with water
- Possibility to draw coffee from the coffee pot even before the coffee preparation process has been finished (just by temporarily opening the valve to draw a cup of coffee and then closing it again)
- May need preheating of the porcelain due to longer than normal extraction time
- Needs coarser than normal coffee grounds (semolina-grade)

== Forms and sizes ==
Known forms include:

- Büttner Kaffee: "Inhalt 2½ Ltr. 16–17 Tassen" (2½ litre, 16–17 cups)
- Büttner / Bauscher: [O/U/K/D] 1423/1, [O/U/K/D] 1423/2, [O/U/K/D] 1423/3, [O/U/K/D] 1423/4, [O/U/K/D] 1423/5
- Bremer Kaffeemaschine / Bauscher Weiden: 1518/3,00 (3 litre)
- Ferd+Eichhorn Braunschweig / Bauscher Weiden: [O/U/K/D] 1521/4
- Büttner / Bauscher: [O/U/K/D] 1521/3, [O/U/K/D] 1521/5
- Bauscher Kaffeesparmaschine System Büttner: 1550/100 (1 litre)
- Bauscher Weiden: 1550/175 (1.75 litre)
- Büttner / Bauscher: 1560/0,80 (0.8 litre), 1560/1,40 (1.4 litre), 1560/1,7 Ltr. G/3½ Ltr. (1.7 litre), 1560/2,00 (2 litre)
- Heimbs & Sohn Braunschweig: 1560/3,00 (3 litre)
- Geschraco / Bauscher Weiden: 1755/1,00 (1 litre)
- Columbus / Bauscher Weiden

Sizes:

- Size 1: 0.5 litre
- Size 2: 0.75 litre
- Size 3: 1.5 litre
- Size 4: 3 litre
- Size 5: 6 litre

== See also ==
- Thürmer coffee maker, an earlier type of coffee brewer combining steeping and drip-filtering utilizing a different type of slit porcelain filter sieve
- Karlsbad-style coffee maker, a type of drip-brewer with a different type of slit porcelain filter sieve
- Percolative immersion
