= Porzellanfabrik Walküre =

German porcelain manufacturer

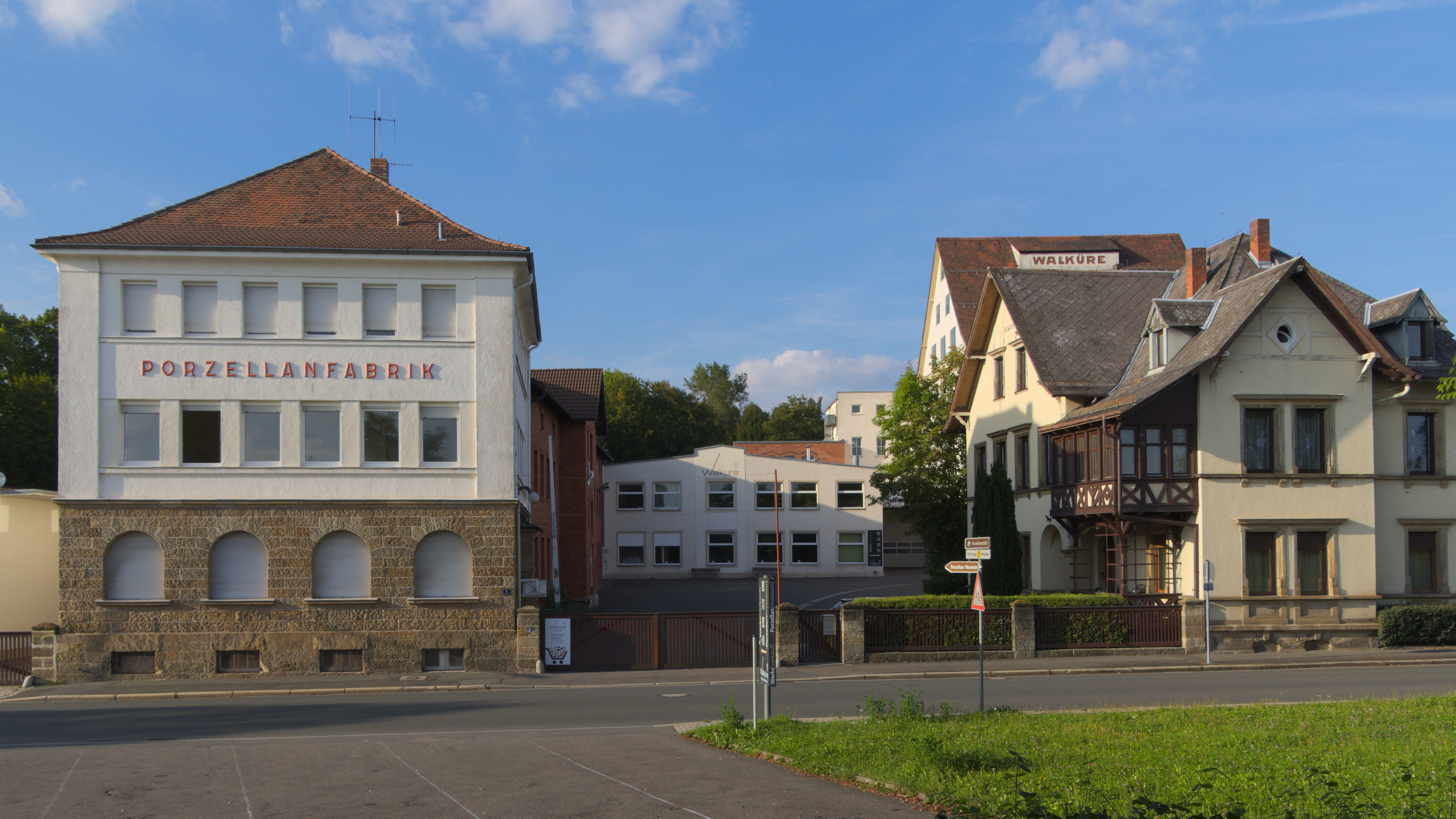
Porzellanfabrik Walküre at Gravenreutherstraße, Bayreuth, 2014

The Erste Bayreuther Porzellanfabrik "Walküre" Siegmund Paul Meyer, commonly known as Porzellanfabrik Walküre and historically as Porzellanfabrik Siegmund Paul Meyer (with porcelain mark SPM (Note: The porcelain mark "SPM" was not only used by Porzellanfabrik Siegmund Paul Meyer & Walküre, but, unrelated, also by the former Berlin-based porcelain manufacturer F. A. Schumann.)), was a porcelain factory in Bayreuth, Germany, that existed for 120 years from 1899 to 2019. In 2020, Friesland Porzellan GmbH secured the rights to the "Walküre" ('Valkyrie') brand.

== History ==
=== Foundation ===
The founder of the porcelain factory, Siegmund Paul Meyer, moved from Nuremberg to Bayreuth in 1890 to work as an accountant for the pottery and oven manufacturer Seiler. Six years later he bought the well-running Georg Bauer porcelain and glass shop at Kulmbacher Straße 20 and set up his own business with a porcelain painting and retail store. For his company he bought white porcelain from Bavarian and Bohemian factories and decorated it in order to later resell it to private individuals. This business model was extremely successful, so the premises on Kulmbacher Straße soon proved to be too small. Since an extension was impossible at this address, Meyer had a painting building built on Gravenreutherstraße in Bayreuth in 1897. Around 20 painters were employed there to decorate cups, patent plates, trophies and other porcelain items.

Due to his success, Meyer finally decided to no longer purchase the porcelain from other factories and instead make it himself. The factory was founded in 1899 under the name "Porzellanfabrik Siegmund Paul Meyer". Initially, it had two round ovens, later followed by a third.

=== First years of company ===
In the first few years after the company was founded, the focus was primarily on increasing the company's awareness at home and abroad. Representative offices of the porcelain factory were set up in various European countries in order to develop the local markets. At the beginning of the 20th century there were representatives in Switzerland, France, England, the Netherlands, Russia and Spain, among others. The products were also presented at exhibitions and trade fairs, particularly at the Leipzig Trade Fair. At the same time, they worked on developing new product lines. The company became particularly known for its fireproof cookware and bakeware, which could be used as both cooking and serving utensils and were known for their durability. These products, which were sold under the trademark "Walküre", developed into the company's flagship product. In 1906, the Siegmund Paul Meyer porcelain factory had around 200 employees.

Siegmund Paul Meyer was considered a particularly caring employer who cared about the health and well-being of his employees. He had workers' apartments built and granted paid vacation as early as 1910. He also installed an exhaust system that removed hazardous fumes and dust in the work area to reduce health risks in the workplace.

During the First World War, the porcelain factory's situation was tense because there were few workers available and it was difficult to obtain the necessary resources. During the 1920s, however, demand rose steadily again, so that the company temporarily employed 300 people. The Great Depression caused another difficult period in the company's history, but together with his son Rudolf, Meyer managed to successfully steer the company through the crisis. By the mid-1930s, the crisis had been overcome and plans were made to expand the company, but these could not be implemented due to the Second World War.

=== Second World War ===
During the Second World War, the porcelain factory's production had to be adapted to the needs of the war economy; in particular, staple goods were produced for those affected by bombing and air raids, as well as for the Wehrmacht. Many of the employees, including Rudolf Meyer in 1939, were drafted; the 75-year-old company founder Siegmund Paul Meyer had to temporarily run the company alone in 1942. When there was no more fuel available, operations were stopped on 3 March 1945. Only a short time later the company premises were occupied by the Americans. After the end of the war, the porcelain factory received a new company license from the Allies on 6 July 1945, but due to the ongoing shortage of raw materials, production could not start again until June 1946. When production resumed, 60 people were employed in the porcelain factory.

=== Technological change ===
The kilns fueled with wood and coal that emitted enormous clouds of smoke during some phases of the firing, and occasionally flames even blazed from the chimney. This was a thorn in the side of the management of the Bayreuth Festival, as the soot clouds covered the nearby festival hall in certain wind directions. Therefore, the Walküre porcelain factory was asked not to use the kilns during breaks in the performance. Finally, in 1959, a modern tunnel kiln was built to solve the smoke problem. At the beginning of 1980, the production facilities were expanded and modernized again, including an isostatic press. In 1990, a fluorine adsorption system was finally purchased, which cleaned all the exhaust gases from the furnaces so that the air emitted was cleaner.

In 2003, a new laser-controlled automated decor center was established. This year, 120 people were employed at the porcelain factory.

=== Specialization in the hotel and catering industry ===
From the 1980s onwards, the Walküre porcelain factory increasingly concentrated on the professional sector and produced for hotels, restaurants, canteens and cruise ships. Customers included Vapiano, AIDA Cruises, Café Landtmann in Vienna and the Hilton Hotel in Munich. In 2008, the company was one of the ten largest suppliers of hotel porcelain on the global market. The products were sold worldwide, with exports focusing particularly on Europe, North America, Japan, Hong Kong and Israel.

=== Insolvency ===
In the 2010s, the company's orders and sales initially declined slowly. In 2019, the order situation deteriorated significantly as larger orders were postponed, meaning that short-time work was temporarily ordered. There was also an increase in quality defects in production. The insolvency application was filed at the beginning of August 2019, the company was to be reorganized with the help of self-administration proceedings, and the two managing directors were assigned a restructuring manager and an administrator. The first layoffs occurred, but business operations initially continued. In October, 46 of the 72 employees at that time were finally laid off. After the search for an investor failed, operations were completely shut down and the remaining employees were laid off. The self-administered insolvency proceedings were converted into standard insolvency at the end of 2019.

=== Friesland Porzellan GmbH ===
With the insolvency of the Walküre porcelain factory, Friesland Porzellan GmbH secured the rights to the "Walküre" brand and several product series, as well as some forms and machines, which it acquired from the insolvency estate in 2020. The aim was to strengthen their own position in the hotel and catering industry. Part of the agreement was also that the previous Walküre owners, the Meyer family, would act as advisors on certain issues. The Walküre products are now manufactured at the Friesland factory in Varel, Germany, using the porcelain mark "FPM". (Note: Friesland Porzellan's new porcelain mark "FPM" stands for Friesland Porzellan-Manufaktur and was chosen as a play on words on the porcelain mark "SPM" (for 'Siegmund Paul Meyer') used by Walküre.)

== Company name ==
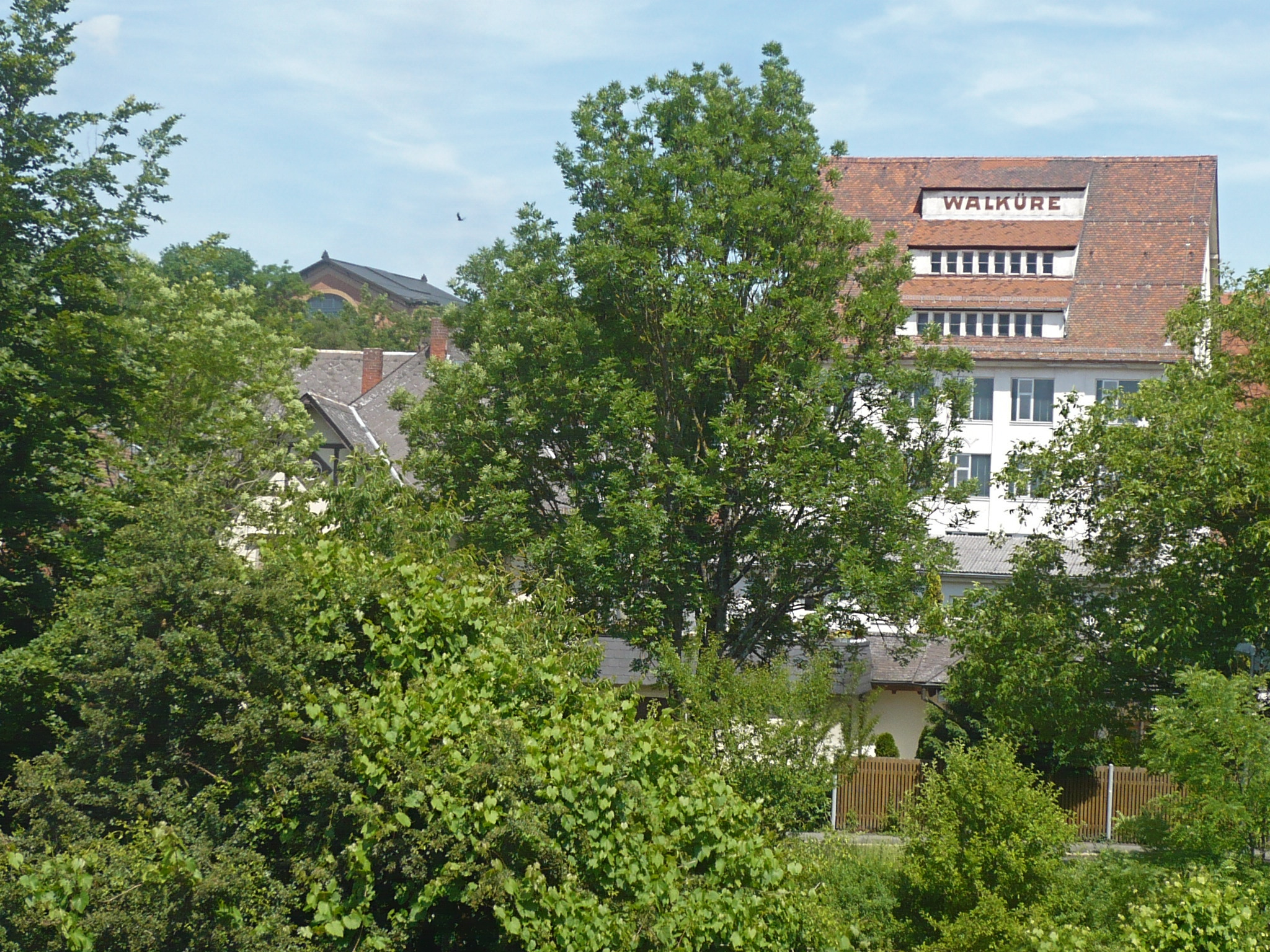
The site of Porzellanfabrik Walküre near the Festspielhaus (to the left)

When the porcelain factory was founded in 1899, it initially bore the company name "Porzellanfabrik Siegmund Paul Meyer". In 1920, another porcelain factory was founded in Bayreuth called "Bayreuther Porzellanfabrik Emil Schlegel AG". Siegmund Paul Meyer feared that the newly founded factory could become known under the name "Bayreuth Porcelain Factory" and that his company, as a long-established company, could lose its reputation as a Bayreuth company. During a company restructuring in 1920, the name of the company was changed to "Erste Bayreuther Porzellanfabrik "Walküre" Siegmund Paul Meyer GmbH". The name "Walküre" ('Valkyrie') refers to the opera of the same name by the composer Richard Wagner and reminds us that the porcelain factory is only a few minutes walk away from the Bayreuth Festival Hall. Initially, this was just the name of the fireproof ovenware for which the company became particularly famous. In 2016, the company name was changed to "Porzellanfabrik Walküre GmbH & Co. KG".

== Porcelain museum ==
The "Porcelain Museum Walküre" was also set up on the factory premises. Here, visitors were able to find out more about porcelain through the ages (1899–1999), particularly in the area of hospitality. The museum was divided into four sections that showed the porcelain in different contexts: an upper-middle-class home from 1899, a 1920s train station restaurant, a 1950s hotel terrace and a modern bar from 1999.

There was also a factory outlet on the factory premises.

== Managing directors ==
- 1899–?: Siegmund Paul Meyer (1866–1944)
- ?–1970: Rudolf Meyer (1906–1983)
- 1966–2015: Rudolf Meyer jun. (* 1940)

1988–2015: Maria Meyer (wife of Rudolf Meyer jun.)

- 2009–2019: Siegmund Meyer & Wolfgang Meyer (sons of Rudolf and Maria Meyer)

== See also ==
- Karlsbad coffee maker (1910–2019)
- Bayreuth coffee maker (2007–2019)
- Walküre cup filter (2010–2019)
- Walküre aroma-pot (2015–2019)
- Porcelain manufacturing companies in Europe
