= Coffee filter =

Coffee brewing utensil

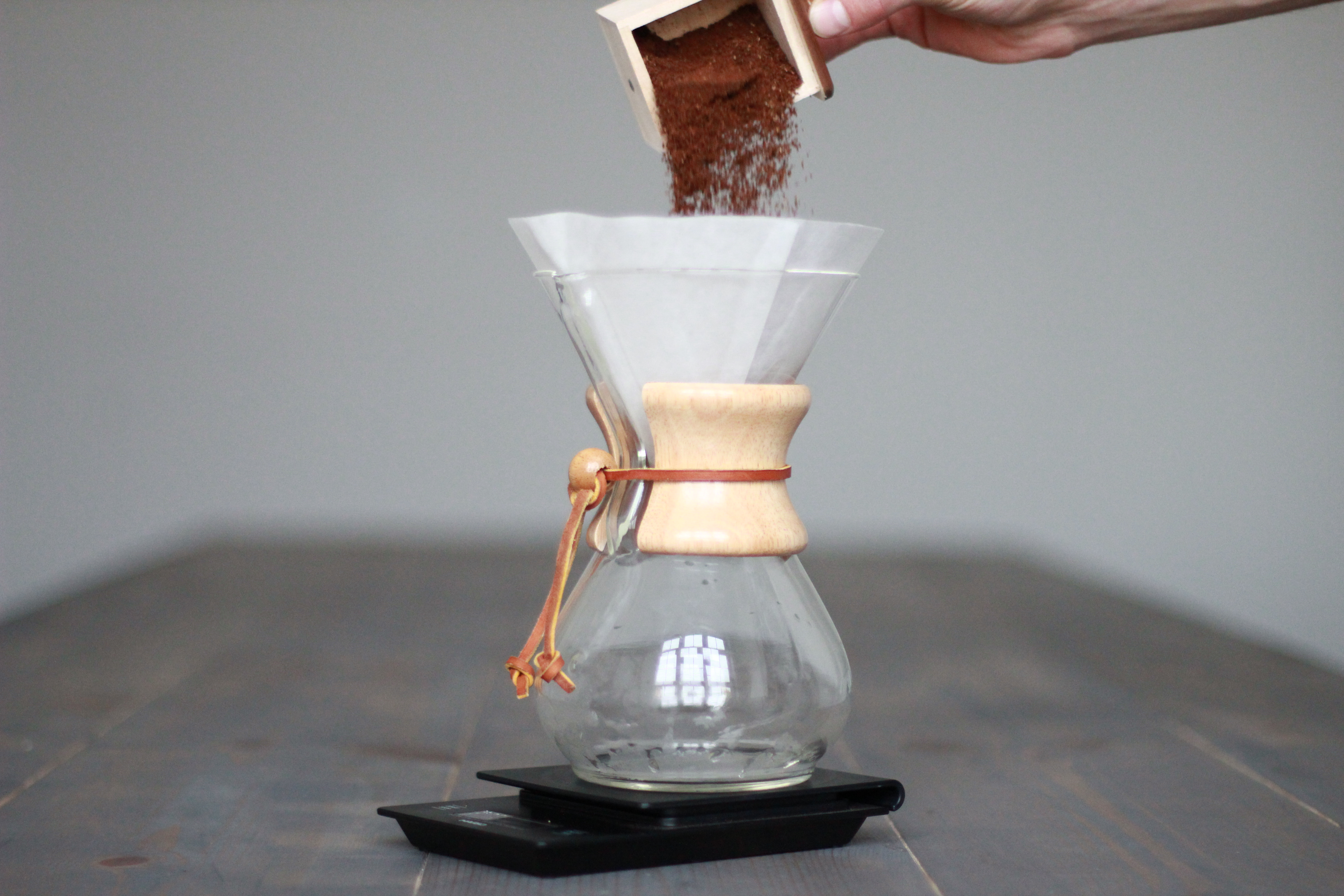
Ground coffee being poured into a paper filter inserted in a Chemex filter holder and caraffe

A coffee filter is a filter used for various coffee brewing methods including but not limited to drip coffee filtering. Filters made of paper (disposable), cloth (reusable), or plastic, metal or porcelain (permanent) are used. (Note: Since filters and filter holders get in direct contact with hot water and coffee, an acidic solution, they should meet all criteria for food contact materials, which some materials, depending on local regulatories, may not. This holds particularly true for materials used in some older or historic filters. Metal alloys may contain problematic ingredients like lead (Pb), nickel (Ni) or chromium (Cr). Aluminium (Al) is suspected to cause Alzheimer disease. Various plastics may contain bisphenol A (BPA), bisphenol F (BPF), bisphenol S (BPS), phthalates, etc. and emit microplastics. Food-grade stainless steel and ceramics, and in particular silicate-based glass and porcelain are considered safe.) Paper and cloth filters require the use of some kind of filter holder, whereas filters made out of other materials may present an integral part of the holder or not, depending on construction. The filter allows the liquid coffee to flow through, but traps the coffee grounds.

== Overview ==
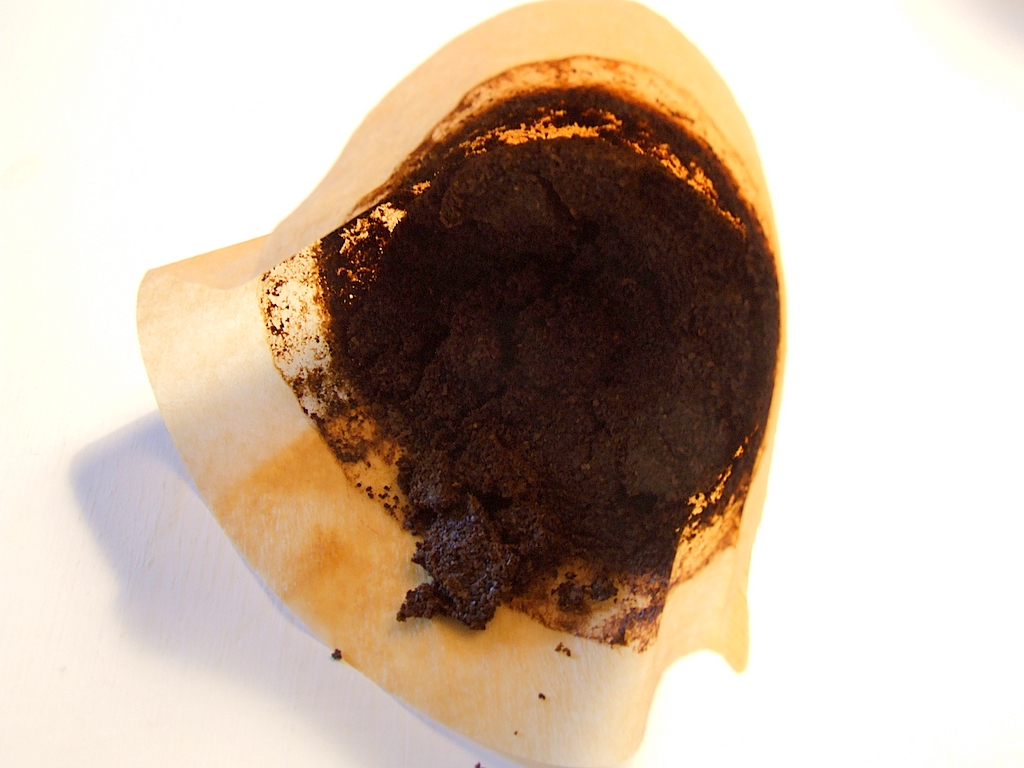
Used coffee filter

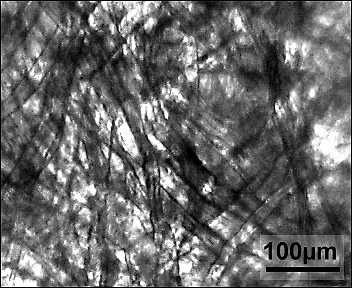
Micro photo of a paper filter

Paper filters remove oily components called diterpenes (like cafestol and kahweol). Metal, nylon or porcelain mesh filters do not remove these components. These organic compounds, present in unfiltered coffee, have anti-inflammatory properties. (Note: Cafestol has also shown anticarcinogenic and neuroprotective properties at least in animals like rats and fruit flies.) Several studies also indicate that the mild consumption of paper-filtered coffee may reduce the risk of coronary heart disease due to reducing these compounds.

Coffee filters of paper are made from about 100 g/m^{2} filter paper. The raw materials (pulp) for the filter paper are coarse long fiber, often from fast-growing trees, e.g. Melitta has used up to 60% bamboo in their filters since 1998. Both bleached and unbleached filters are made.

Coffee filters are typically made up of filaments approximately 20 micrometres wide, which allow particles through that are less than approximately 10 to 15 micrometres.

Some baristas claim that paper filters exhibit a "paperish" taste and recommend washing out the filter with a flush of hot water before filling the ground coffee into the filter.

Since paper filters filter out some components the resulting coffee is said to taste somewhat fruitier compared to permanent filters.

For a filter to be compatible with a filter holder (in the case of drip coffee preparation also called a dripper) or coffee maker, the filter needs to be a specific shape and size.

== Disposable paper filters ==
=== History of paper filters ===
In 1782, Johann Georg Krünitz described a then-new method to extract coffee utilizing blotting paper in a (tinned) metal filter cone.

In Germany and the Netherlands, filter paper inserts were used in narrow conical metal filter holders called "Hamburger Spitztrichter" (Hamburg filter) to extract drip coffee. In 1785, a silver filter was manufactured by Johann Christopher Hellmers, suggesting that porcelain versions existed even earlier. Hamburg filters made out of (enameled) metal or porcelain were still very common in the early 1900s in Germany.

In 1847, Elard Römershausen (aka Elard Romershausen and Elard [von] Rommershausen) experimented with paper filters while constructing an early "air press coffee machine".

In 1885, Heinrich Böhnke-Reich (aka Boehnke-Reich) warned of using old wall paper as coffee filters, but favorably described sheets of thick wool-style greyish paper which could be cut into shape for use as quick filters in a conical filter holder.

In 1894, the Wilda'sche coffee filter device by Eugen Wilda used single-use cloth filter bags, which, in the corresponding patent, were considered to be superior to paper filter bags presumably already in use at the time.

On 8 July 1908, the first commercial paper coffee filter was a 94 mm round filter disk devised by the German entrepreneur Melitta Bentz. She wanted to remove the bitter taste caused by overbrewing. She patented her invention and formed a company, Melitta, to sell the coffee filters (in a format and size later named "1" (Note: Fan- or boat-shaped filters of size #1 (Melitta 101) must not be confused with paper filter sizes Melitta 1 for round filter disks or Hario 01 for cone-shaped filters.)), hiring her husband and two sons to assist her as the first employees.

=== Filter shapes and sizes ===
==== Cone-, fan- or boat-shaped filters ====
===== Melitta filter systems and derivatives =====
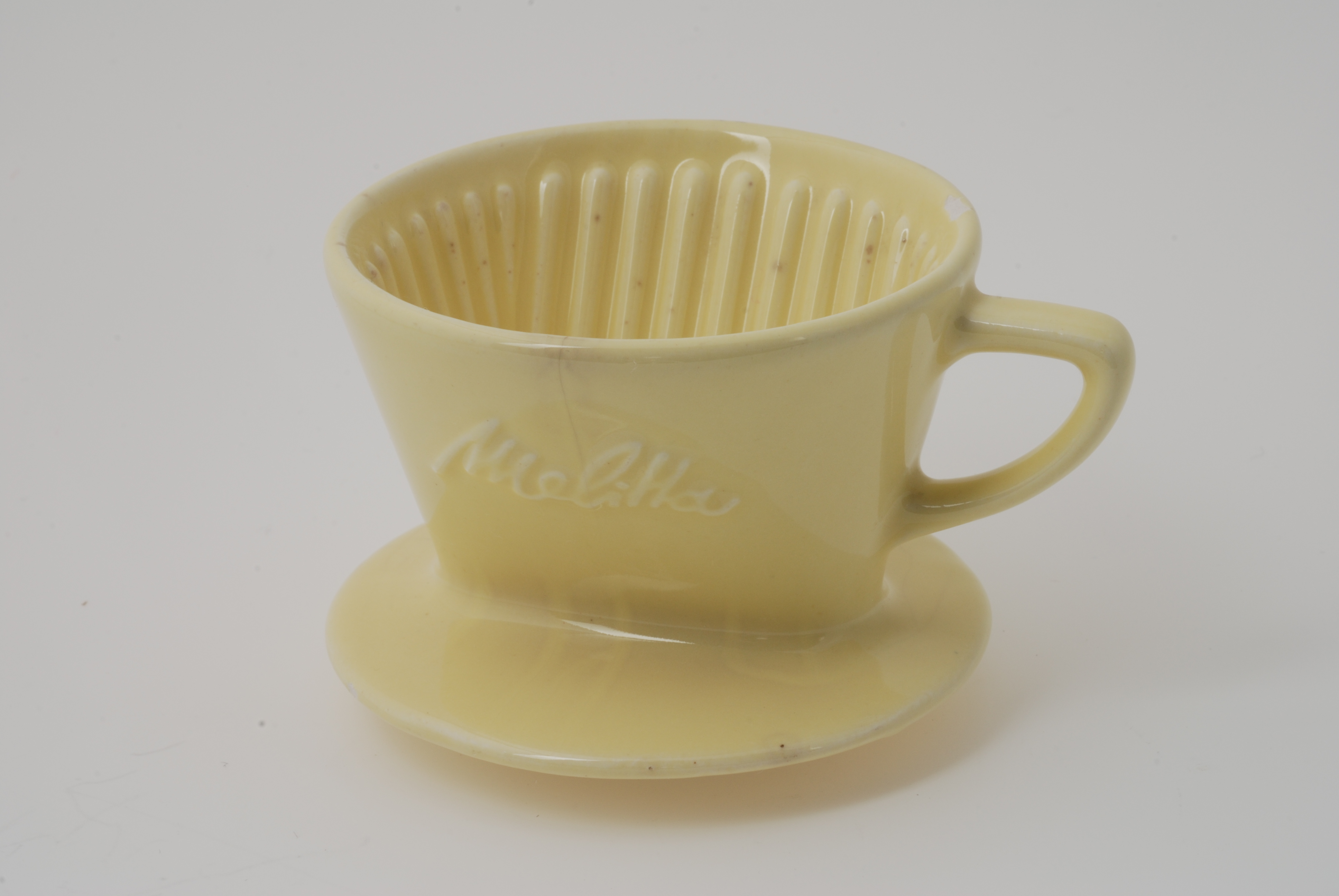
1960s glazed ceramic filter holder made by Melitta

Since 1930/1931, there was a conical paper coffee filter named "Blitz-Filter" (English: flash filter) featuring rims manufactured by the Berlin-based Blitz-Filter GmbH, a filter paper manufacturer, holding a D.R.G.M. utility patent on their filter. In 1931, Paul Ciupka proposed conical paper coffee filters, which reportedly led to the construction of another coffee filter named "Brasil Kaffeefilter" at the Göttinger Aluminiumwerke (now Alcan) in 1932. It was recommended by the press. Melitta bought the rights to the Göttingen D.R.G.M. filter patent and, still in 1932, introduced their Schnell-Filter (English: quick filter), a cone-shaped filter holder looking almost identical to the Brasil filter with a circular bottom with 8 (later 4) holes suitable for use with squarish sheets of filter paper, which still had to be pressed into shape through a metal cone (a so called Eindrücker (presser), a type of filter shaping tool also known as "negotiator" today). These quick filter holders were manufactured of porcelain or metal, available in sizes named "100", "101", "102", and "103". This system was available up to 1939.

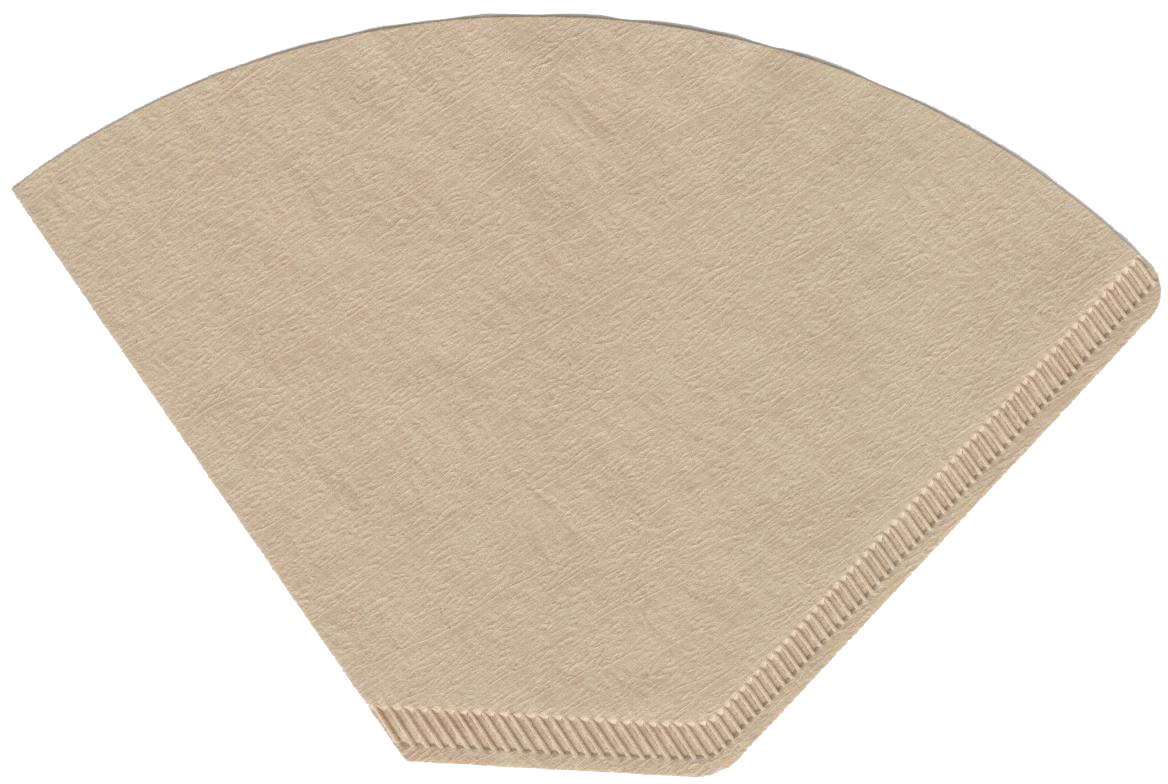
Fan- or boat-shaped coffee filter, made of unbleached paper

Patented in 1935, Melitta introduced the Filtertüte (English: filter bag) in various sizes in 1936 or 1937 In Germany, Melitta holds a trademark on the term "Filtertüte" (English: filter bag) for the conical fan- or boat-shaped paper filter introduced in 1937, that is why other manufacturers use terms like coffee filter, paper filter, etc.

In 1936, Melitta also took over the manufacturer of the "Blitz-Filter". The cone-shaped filter holders were refined in 1936 to get a slot-shaped bottom (originally with 4 holes) more suitable for the filter bags, now looking more fan- or boat-shaped. Over the years the system was expanded to eventually consist of filter bag sizes "100" (for 1–2 cups à 1/6–1/8 litre), "101" (for 2–3 or 2–4 cups), "102" (for 3–6, 4–6 or 4–8 cups), "103" (for 6–15, 8–15 cups or 10–15), "104" (for 15–25 or 15–30 cups), "105" (for 25–50 or 30–60 cups), "106" (for 50–80 or 60–100 cups), "112" (for 2 cups, with pot mount) and "123" (for 6–10 cups). The system also included special types like tea filters "401" (1–6 cups, compatible with "101") and "402" (for 3–9 cups, compatible with "102") and the miniature filter "801" (for 1–2 or 1–3 small cups for children, or 1 normal cup). Brigitta once marketed a fan- or boat-shaped filter size "502". A disadvantage of the system was that one had to pour water continuously or several times while the proper amount of necessary water could only be guessed.

Therefore, in 1963 or 1965 Melitta developed a new fan- or boat-shaped filter system with corresponding "1×" nomenclature: In this system the filters are sized big enough so that the whole amount of water (except for the water needed for blooming) can be poured in one go. Consequently, the filter sizes "1×2", "1×4", "1×6" and "1×10" result in 2, 4, 6, and 10 cups of coffee when filling the filter once. Since these filters only differ in height and have otherwise the exact same geometry, bottom width (about 49 mm) and angle (about 54°), the filter bags are interchangeable between filter holders of different sizes.

Both systems are still in use today in principle, but the sizes "101", "103", "104", "105", "106", "112", "123", "401", "402", ("502",) "801" and "1×10" are no longer manufactured.

Common in the US are fan- or boat-shaped filters "#0" (similar to "100"), "#1" (similar to "101"), "#2" (similar to "102"), (Note: Fan- or boat-shaped filters of size #2 (Melitta 102) must not be confused with the fan- or boat-shaped paper filter size Melitta 1×2, cone-shaped filter size Hario 02, or with Melitta 2 round filter disks. Melitta 102 has a different geometry and is significantly larger than Melitta 1×2, almost as large as Melitta 1×4. The size #2 Ritzenhoff & Breker "Rio 101" porcelain filter holder incorrectly associates this with size 101.) "#4" (similar to "1×4"), (Note: Fan- or boat-shaped filters of size #4 (Melitta 1×4) must not be confused with the much larger fan- or boat-shaped filter size Melitta 104. Still, the size #4 Ritzenhoff & Breker "Rio 104" porcelain filter holder incorrectly associates this with size 104.) and "#6" (similar to "1×6"), (Note: Fan- or boat-shaped filters of size #6 (Melitta 1×6) must not be confused with the much larger fan- or boat-shaped filter size Melitta 106.) (Note: Another reason for this easier nomenclature becoming more popular is because Melitta has trademarked the names of their filter bag sizes at least in Germany.) with "#2", "#4" and "#6" being particularly popular, as well as basket-shaped filters in an 8–12 cup home size and larger restaurant sizes.

===== Hario filter system =====
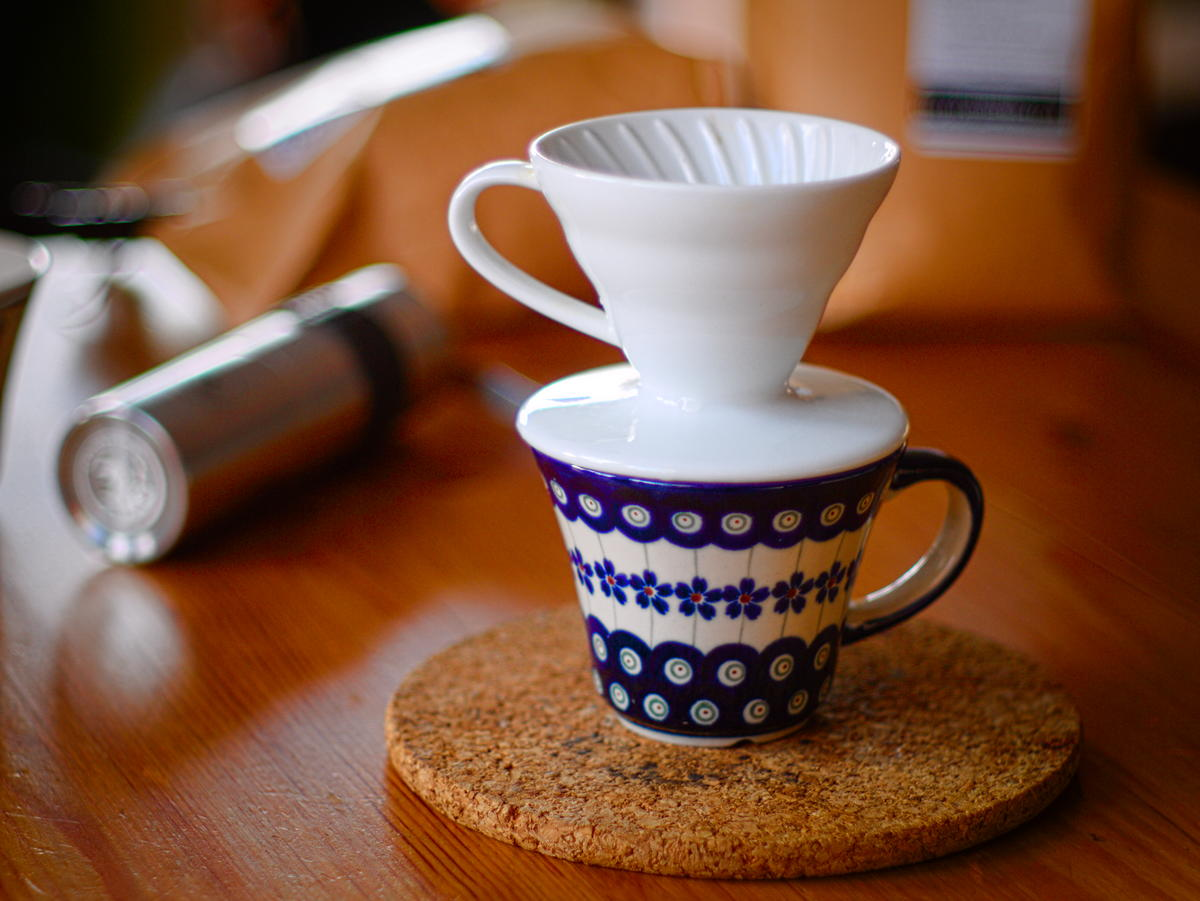
A Hario V60 permanent filter holder placed on a mug.

The Hario "vector 60" V60 is a cone-shaped brewer (with 60° angle), with ribs along the wall (to prevent the paper sticking and allowing air through) and a single large hole (to allow water to pass through unrestricted). Hario began designing brewers in 1980; the V60 design was released in 2004. The brewer received the Japanese Good Design Award in 2007 and is used by many of the winners in the World Brewers Cup. In partnership with 2013 World Barista Champion Pete Licata it was further developed into the Hario W60, a brewer with a flat-bottomed mesh filter, to "address the concern baristas have with 'flat bed' brewing". The Hario Switch combines steeping with drip filtering.

Hario has cone-shaped paper filter bag sizes "01" (for 1 cup), "02" (for 1–4 cups) and "03" (for 1–6 cups).

==== Other filter shapes ====
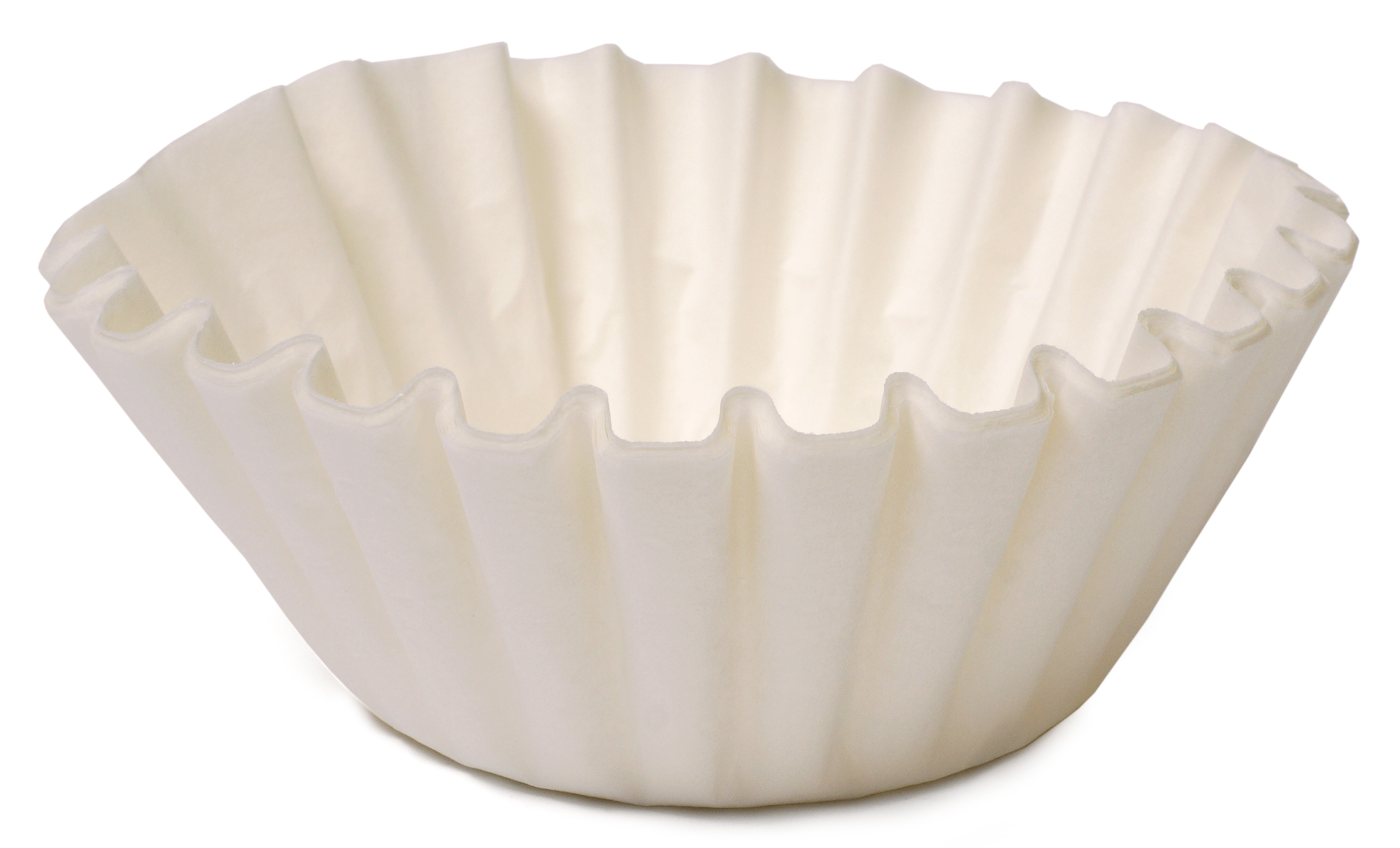
A basket-type coffee filter, here made of bleached paper

Saint Anthony Industries (SAI) introduced a conical filter called "C70" (2018) and a flat-bottom filter "F70" (2019) with a steep 70° angle.

Other Melitta filter sizes include the pyramid filters "202s", "203", "206(G)", "220(G)", "240(G)" and "270(G)", round filter disks "1" (94 mm), "1a" (60 mm), "2" (120 mm) and "2b", and "50", circle filter rings (for percolators) "3 1/2 in." (89 mm), "164mm", "190mm", "203mm", "235mm", "240mm", "244mm", "256mm", "260mm", "290mm", "330mm", "400mm" and "440mm", prepleated flat-bottom basket filters "(A)250/90" (250 mm/90 mm, also known as "90/250") and "(A)250/110" (250 mm/110 mm), roll filters "2004" as well as wrap filters (for percolators, 232 × 241 mm). While some of them are still available today, most of them have fallen out of use for long.

A squarish pyramid filter Filtra "602" was available as well.

Other basket filter sizes include "101/317", "152/350", "152/457", "203/533" and "280/635".

Other round filter disks include 160 mm, 220 mm, 195 mm, 230 mm.

The Aeropress and Ceado Hoop use round paper filter disks with a diameter of c. 63 mm.

The German Tricolate coffee dripper uses round paper filter disks with a diameter of 88 mm.

The Kanas-based NextLevel drippers use proprietary round disk paper filters as well (95 mm for the LVL-10 and 77 mm for the Pulsar).

The Hario cold brew dripper Slow Brew "Shizuku" (WDC-6) and Water Dripper Clear (WDW-6) take 58 mm round filter disks.

===== Chemex filter system =====
The six conical filter holder sizes for the Chemex coffee maker (originally introduced in 1941) and the Funnex utilize two different sizes of paper filters. A half-moon shaped filter paper (bleached: FP-2, unbleached: FP-2N) is used for the 3-cup holders (CM-1, CM-1C, CM-1GH) and the Funnex (CM-FNX), which must be folded before use. The larger holders for 5 (CM-2), 6 (CM-6A, CM-6GH), 8 (CM-3, CM-8A, CM-8GH), 10 (CM-10A, CM-10GH) and 13 cups (CM-4) can alternatively use prefolded square sheets (bleached: FS-100, unbleached: FSU-100), prefolded circle filters (bleached: FC-100) or unfolded circle filters (bleached: FP-1). The paper is 20–30% thicker than regular paper filters.

=== Other filter parameters and properties ===
Other important coffee filter paper parameters are strength, compatibility, efficiency and capacity.

If a coffee filter is not strong enough, it will tear or rupture, allowing coffee grains through to the coffee pot. Compatibility describes a filter medium's resistance to degradation by heat and chemical attack; a filter that is not compatible with the liquid passing through it is likely to break down, losing strength (structural failure). Efficiency is the retention of particles in a target (size) category. The efficiency is dictated by the particles or substances to be removed. A large-mesh filter may be efficient at retaining large particles but inefficient at retaining small particles. Capacity is the ability to "hold" previously removed particles while allowing further flow. A very efficient filter may show poor capacity, causing increased resistance to flow or other problems as it plugging up prematurely and increasing resistance or flow problems. A balance between particle capture and flow requirements must be met while ensuring integrity.

== Reusable cloth filters ==
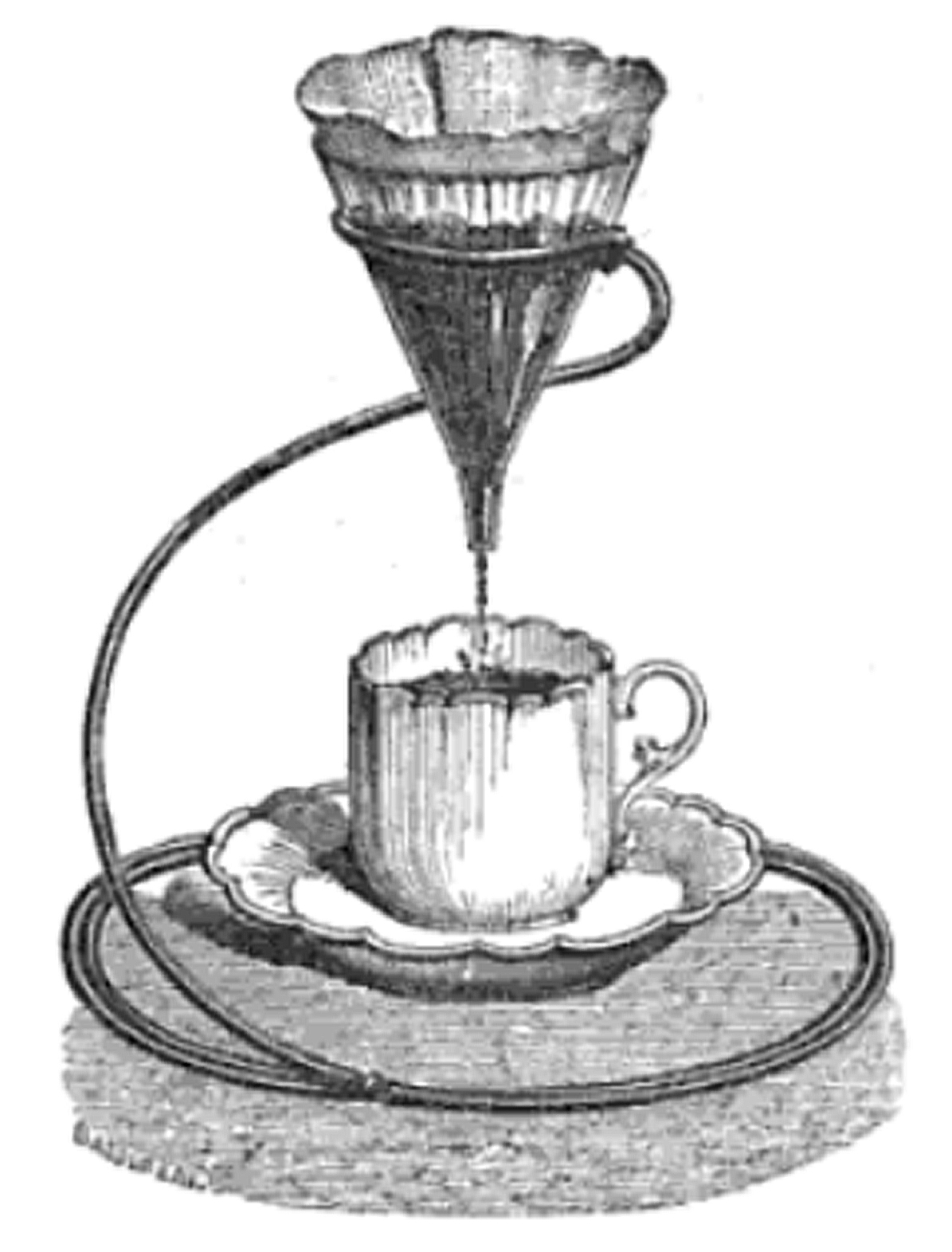
Flannel filter placed on a metal support in 1868.

Reusable cloth (such as cotton, hemp, linen, silk, wool, hair cloth, horse hair, fustian, muslin or flannel) has been used to filter coffee for a very long time. Like paper, it strains out the coffee grounds, but the cloth filter allows more of the oil to come through than paper filters. An example of a cloth filter is the bolsita in Costa Rican chorreador coffee makers.

== Permanent filters ==
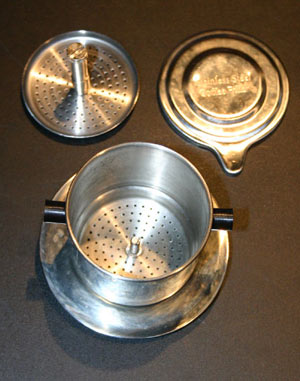
Vietnamese Phin metal filter

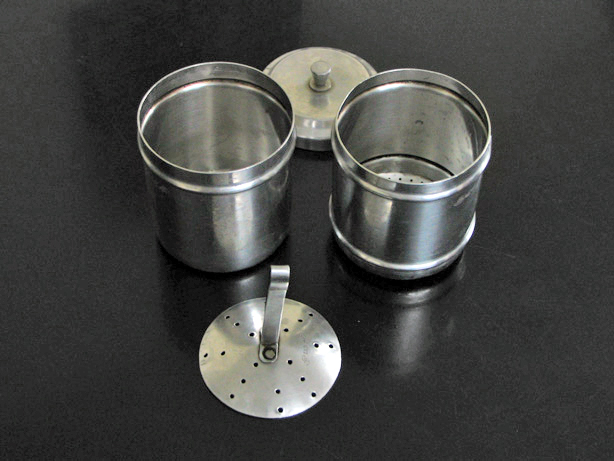
Indian permanent metal filter

Permanent filters can be divided into two groups:

The first type integrates the filter sieve with the holding mechanism into one part.

The second type of permanent filters are inserts to be used with a separate filter holder. For this, they are resembling the shape of disposable paper or reusable cloth filters otherwise used with those filter holders. Like them they can exhibit some amount of water bypass.

Permanent metal filters are also used to prepare filtered coffee, including Vietnamese iced coffee and Indian filter coffee. The "French press" (also referred to as cafetière) uses a metal filter. Other types of permanent filters are made of plastic, porous ceramics, or porcelain (like the double-layered cross-slit strainer made from through-glazed porcelain of Karlsbad-style coffee makers or the special porcelain filter sieves of Büttner system coffee makers).

== Filter holders ==
Filter holders are made out of plastic (including Makrolon/Exolon, Tritan, Ecozen), metal (stainless steel, copper, aluminium, emaille), ceramics, porcelain or glass, or rarely, wood. Most of them are designed to be used with disposable paper and reusable cloth filter inserts, but there is also an after-market of permanent filter inserts made out of plastic, metal or ceramics which can be used in filter holders originally designed for paper or cloth filters. Another type of permanent filters combines the actual filter sieve with its holding mechanism into one integral part.

Filter holders for cone-, fan- or boat- as well as for flat-bottom shaped (paper) filters can be distinguished by features of their mechanical construction, some of which also have a significant influence on taste, brewing time, utility and how (easy) to clean the filter holder:

- filter geometry (Melitta-, Hario-, SAI- or Orea-style filter shape and angle, etc.)
- filter size (depending on filter geometry and system for a different number of cups and/or different pouring styles)
- rib structure (straight (Melitta, Hario), interrupted (Seltmann Weiden or Beem), or origami design), direction (straight down (Melitta), spiral (Hario, Seltmann Weiden, Beem)), spacing (narrow, sparse) and location (whole inner surface of filter cone, only at lower half of filter cone) to influence bypass and clogging
- bottom structure (with or without ridges, conical, apex or flat) to influence channeling and clogging
- number of draining holes (1, 2, 3, 4, 5, 8, 10 or 12) and diameter (one large hole as for Hario-, one or more equally-sized small holes as for Melitta-style filters, combination of a large center hole with small surrounding holes as for the Torch Mountain dripper, or an adjustable count of holes as with the December dripper)
- material (porcelain, ceramics, stainless steel, copper, aluminium, glass, plastic) and color
- mount (standard plate mount for pots or cups, affixable pot mount (like Melitta 112), ring mount for a coffee stand or tripod, long cylinder outlet to fit Thermos bottles (like Fröfilt K, Alfi Aroma Plus, or Gefu Sandro / Cilio #4 filters, or the Friesland filter adapter), single-cup filter mount, or integrated with coffee pot (like with Melitta Diabolo))
- type of handle (none, style of handle, number of grips)
- special features like stopper valves (as for Melitta 401/402 tea filter holders, the Clever Dripper, the Bonavita Immersion Dripper, the Goat Story GINA, the December Dripper, the Hario Switch, the Melitta Amano, the NextLevel Pulsar, or the Sworksdesign Bottomless Dripper) for steep & release brewing, cup-viewing windows (as for Zero Japan Bee House filters, Melitta filter holders since 2018, or the Le Creuset dripper), anti-dribbling "tripod" plate design, design for simultaneous pouring into one or two cups (as for Melitta filter holders since 2018), double-walled design for better thermal insulation (as for Melitta Oslo Form 23 "102 M" filters, KPM Café Berlin LAB filters #2/#4, the Seltmann Weiden No Limits Barista filter #2, the Melitta 111th Anniversary Set filter 102, the Fellow Stagg X/XF drippers, the Chemex Funnex, the notNeutral Gino dripper, the Villeroy & Boch Coffee Passion V60 filter, the Brewista Tornado Duo filters, or the Etkin 8-cup and 2-cup drippers), radial water feeding (like with the Ceado Hoop), or a collapsible design for easier storage
- accessories like a water spreader or cover lid or top-plate to help water distribution and reduce the temperature decline during pouring, a saucer to catch coffee droplets after use, a mounting stand, or coffee chilling stones.

Metal and porcelain filter holders store more heat than glass or plastic filters and therefore should be pre-heated to avoid too large temperature drops during pouring.

== See also ==
- Drip brew
- Coffee pod (coffee bag)
- Single-serve coffee container
- Ground coffee filter ring
- Tea bag or tea ball
- Used coffee grounds
- Health effects of coffee
- Flip coffee pot
- Indian filter coffee

== Notes ==
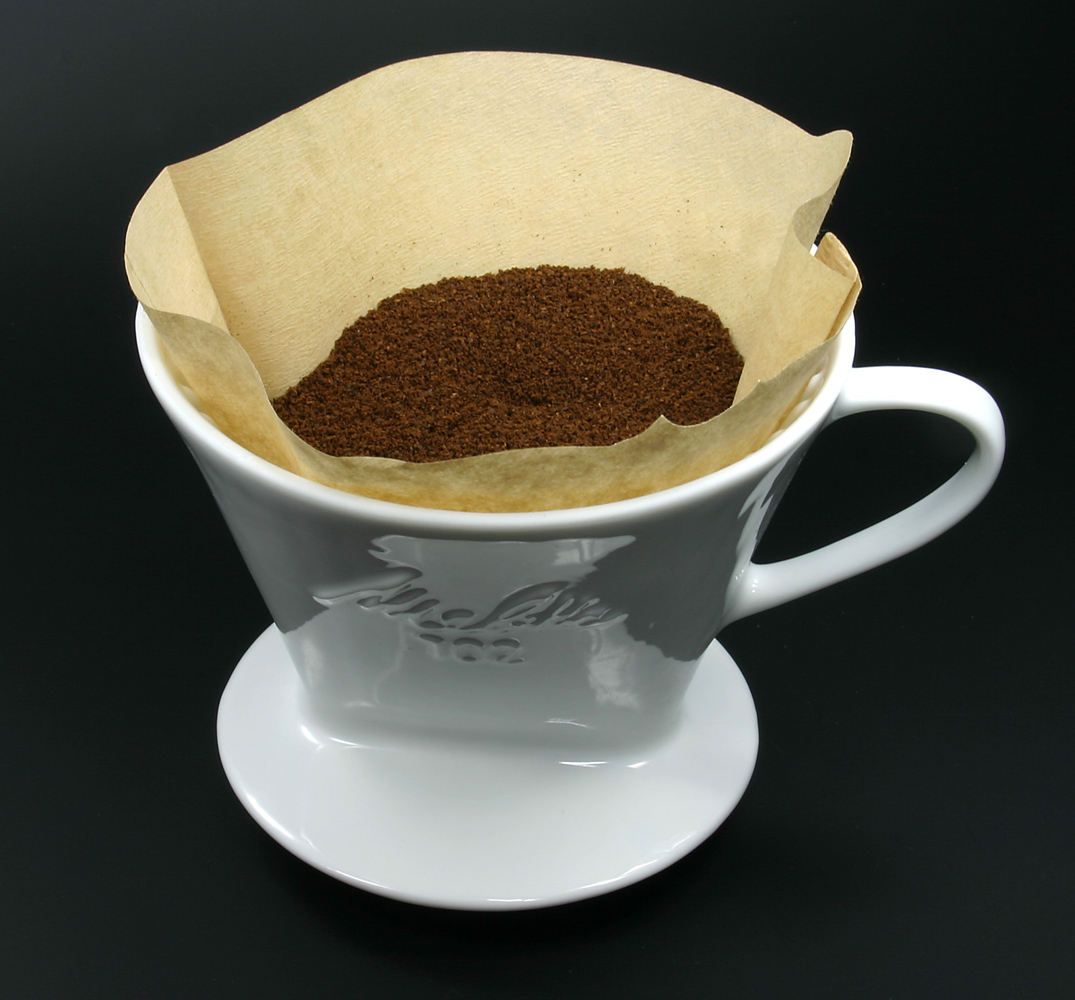
Melitta porcelain filter holder "102" with too large paper filter bag "1×4"
