= Thun Karlovarský porcelán =

German and Czech porcelain manufacturer

Thun 1794 (official name Thun 1794 a.s.) is a Czech porcelain manufacturer using the porcelain mark "TK". Originally founded in 1793/1794 as Thun'sche Porcellanfabrik, it is the oldest and largest Czech porcelain manufacturer. Originally it operated in three locations: Klášterec nad Ohří (formerly Klösterle an der Eger), Sadov-Lesov (formerly Sodau-Lessau) and Nová Role (formerly Neurohlau).

== History ==
=== Klášterec nad Ohří ===
The company in Klášterec nad Ohří was founded in 1794 by Franz Joseph Graf von Thun und Hohenstein and Johann Nikolaus Weber. From the beginning, it has focused on the production of tableware. In the seventies of the 20th century, the factory was moved to new premises. The production of porcelain in the Klášterec plant stopped in September 2023. It was taken over by plants in Nová Role and Lesov, whose semi-finished products continued to be decorated, fired and packaged in Klášterec. Porcelain from the Klášterec factory is part of the collections of the Porcelain museum of Klášterec nad Ohří.

=== Concordia Lesov ===
The factory was founded in 1888 by Ernst Máder. Between 1941 and 1945, the site was used by Melitta. After World War II, the company became part of the Karlovy Vary porcelain company. It was purchased by Thun 1794 in 2009.

=== Nová Role ===
The plant was founded in 1921. After World War II, it became part of the Karlovy Vary porcelain company. In 2009, the plant was purchased by the newly formed company Thun 1794, based in Nová Role.

== See also ==
- Oswald von Thun und Hohenstein (1849–1913)
- Karlsbad coffee maker (1878)
