= Coffee extraction =

Extraction of chemical compounds from coffee grounds

Coffee extraction occurs when hot water is poured over coffee grounds, causing desirable compounds such as caffeine, carbohydrates, lipids, melanoidins and acids to be extracted from the grounds. The degree to which extraction occurs depends on a number of factors, such as water temperature, brewing time, grind fineness, and quantity of grounds.

== Definitions ==
Brew ratio describes the ratio of coffee to water, by mass.

Strength, also known as solubles concentration, refers to the percentage of dissolved solids per unit of liquid in the final beverage. A higher concentration of solubles is associated with a stronger beverage, and lower concentration with a weaker, more "watery", beverage. Strength varies between coffee beverage types; for most it ranges from 1.15% and 1.35%. Ristretto, one of the strongest traditional coffee drinks, can contain up to 0.75 g of solubles per 15 gram serving (over 5% of total volume), making it more than four times as strong as the typical coffee beverage. Strength can also vary to a significant degree between coffee grown in different regions.

As the degree of extraction increases, strength increases, resulting in a beverage that is darker in color and oilier in terms of mouthfeel – however, this can also vary by amount of suspended solids (very small grinds, so-called "fines"), particularly in French press brewing. As extraction time increases, the risk of unwanted solubles – often associated with overwhelming bitterness – being extracted also increases. If yield is held constant, strength is determined primarily by brewing ratio. Caffeine is extracted early in the brewing process, so longer extraction does not result in significantly more caffeinated coffee. Adding water to a drink after brewing changes strength but not yield (yield is determined by the amount of water initially present during brewing). An Americano only differs from an espresso in strength – it is traditionally diluted after brewing to a strength below 1.5% (also resulting in the removal of crema).

Extraction yield refers to the solubles dissolved during brewing. This is often expressed as a percentage of the coffee's mass. It is also known as solubles yield or simply extraction. The extraction yield percentage describes the mass transferred from coffee grounds to water, expressed as a percentage of the initial mass of the grounds. It is given by the following:
$$Y = \frac{M_2\cdot t}{M_1}$$
where $Y$ is the extraction yield expressed as a percentage, $t$ is the total dissolved solids expressed as a percentage of the final beverage, $M_1$ is the mass of the grounds in grams, and $M_2$ is the final beverage's mass in grams. This means that an extraction yield of 20% can be obtained by brewing 18 grams of coffee, resulting a 36-gram final beverage with a $t$ of 10%. Yield can also be expressed as total dissolved solids, or parts-per-million (ppm).

== Achieving desired extraction ==
An extraction yield of 18% to 22% is desirable for most traditional coffee beverages. Yields of under 18% are considered under-extracted, or under-developed – desirable compounds have not been extracted to the fullest. The resulting beverage is unbalanced and often associated with a predominantly sour taste – acids are extracted early in the brewing process, while balancing compounds such as sugars and bitter substances are extracted later. Yields of over 22% are considered over-extracted and are often associated with a predominant bitterness – bitter compounds are extracted after acids and sugars have largely dissolved. However, in certain situations where advanced brewing equipment is involved, yields surpassing 22% can be achieved absent the characteristic bitterness.

A brewing control chart can be used to control a beverage's degree of extraction and strength. The optimal ratio between extraction and strength is represented by a rectangle in the center of the chart – within that area, coffee is neither over- nor under-extracted, and neither too strong nor weak. At any point along the diagonal line plotted on the chart, extraction and strength are directly proportional.

The following describes the relationship between strength and brew ratio.
$$\frac{t}{V} = \frac{M}{V} \times \frac{t}{M}$$
where $t$ is the total dissolved solids expressed as a percentage of the mass of the grounds, $V$ is the volume of the water used, and $M$ is the mass of the grounds. In other words, the strength of a beverage is the product of the brew ratio and the extraction percentage.

An extraction yield of 18% to 22% and a strength of 1.15% to 1.35% is considered typical in North America. In Nordic countries, the ideal strength is typically considered to be 1.30% to 1.50%. For European countries, 1.20% to 1.45%.

Common brewing ratios
Style	Grams per Litre	Ratio	Strength
North American	55	18:1	1.25%
Nordic	63	16:1	1.40%
European	58	17:1	1.35%

=== Increasing or decreasing extraction yield ===
Yields depend primarily on temperature, brew time, grind size, and brewing method. Yield is inversely proportional to grind size; a smaller grain size produces more surface area and faster extraction. A longer brewing time results in a higher yield. French press coffee is often brewed from coarsely-ground grinds, with a brew time of 3–4 minutes. Filter coffee is associated with a smaller grain size and shorter brew time. Espresso is made with very finely ground coffee with a brew time of 20–30 seconds.

Extraction rates vary between brewing methods. For immersion brewing methods, such as French press and vacuum brewing, extraction takes place slowly. Turkish coffee is brewed with extremely finely-ground coffee that is left suspended in the final beverage. Some brewing methods soak a column of grounds, such as pour-over, espresso, and percolation. In the espresso method, water can saturate the column unevenly from bottom to top, resulting in uneven extraction.

Once the ideal yield has been reached, the grounds are removed from the water, halting extraction. For this reason, coffee is commonly removed from the brewing chamber of a French press after extraction has occurred. Percolators are notoriously prone to over-extraction, due to a design feature that causes coffee to pass through a basket of grounds multiple times. Coffee may be intentionally over-extracted to achieve increased strength while reducing the amount of ground coffee required. However, this often results in a more bitter, less full-bodied beverage.

Water temperature can affect the degree to which desirable solubles are extracted. A commonly recommended brewing temperature for traditional coffee beverages is 91–94 °C (196–201 °F), which facilitates full extraction of desired compounds. To achieve this temperature, water is often briefly left to come off the boil before brewing. Heat loss during brewing may also occur – in the manual pour-over method, the mixture of coffee grounds and water, or slurry, is notoriously prone to heat loss, and high temperatures can be difficult to maintain. The impact of transient temperature – the temperature of the final coffee beverage after brewed is finished – does not matter as much as brewing temperature; briefly heating coffee does not destroy its taste.

External images
- SCAA brew chart (American)
- SCAE brew chart (European)
- NCA brew chart (Norwegian)

=== Espresso ===
Espresso yield is generally 15–25%: 25% is quoted as the Italian extraction. Espresso yield has received significantly less attention in the literature than brewed coffee extraction.

Espresso yield features a number of surprising properties:

- yield depends primarily on depth of the "puck" (cylinder of coffee grounds);
- yield is inverse to puck depth;
- yield does not depend significantly on brewing time – yield at first increases approximately linearly, then plateaus after approximately 20 seconds;
- strength is independent of dose.

Strength depends instead on grind: finer grinds yield a "shorter" (ristretto) espresso (less liquid, so higher brew ratio, at same yield gives more strength), while coarser grinds yield a "longer" (lungo) espresso, while an intermediate grind yields a "normale" espresso.
