= Nadir Sedrati =

French serial killer

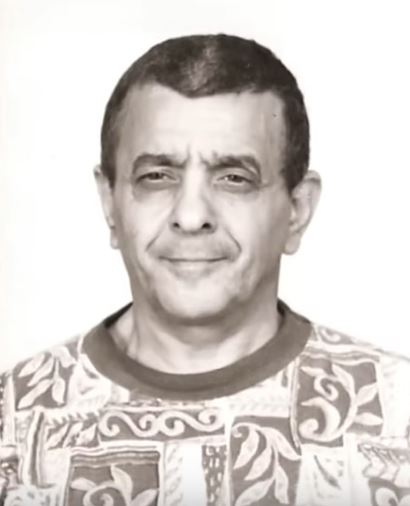
- Sedrati in final arrest, in 1999.
- Born: 26 March 1938 (age 88); Gavet, Isère, France
- Other names: "The Canal Cutter"; Dominique Sedrati "Bambino"; Philippe Grossiord
- Conviction: Murder
- Penalty: Life imprisonment with 22 years preventative detention

Details
- Victims: 3–5+
- Span of crimes: 19 May 1982 – 19 July 1999
- Country: France
- State: Grand Est
- Date apprehended: 21 July 1999

Nadir Sedrati (born 26 March 1938), known as The Canal Cutter (French: Le Dépeceur du Canal), is a French serial killer who was convicted of killing and dismembering three people from May to July 1999, whose remains he would later dump in the Marne–Rhine Canal near Nancy. He is also suspected in at least two disappearances dating back to 1982, for which he was never charged.

== Early life ==
Nadir Sedrati was born on 26 March 1938 in the village of Gavet in Isère, the younger of two boys born to Algerian immigrants. His father died when he was three, and due to the ongoing World War and her mother's incapability to take care of them, the two brothers were placed in an orphanage. Shortly afterwards, Sedrati's older brother, Milhoud, was expelled due to being overtly violent, but Nadir was allowed to stay due to his more calm and intelligent nature.

On 2 October 1946, at the age of 8 and a half, Sedrati was baptized at the church in Douvaine. As he was frequently called 'Dominique' instead of his given name, he grew up with the impression that that was his real name until 1952, when he checked his identity papers and learned his true name. In addition to this, he learned that his father, whom he had never met, had died during the Second World War, which left a mark on the impressionable young man which subsequently led him to commit petty crimes.

=== First packages and internments ===
As a teenager in the 1950s, Sedrati was involved in a string of petty thefts, for which he was not convicted.

In 1957, at the age of 19, Sedrati joined the army. Performing his military service during the Algerian War, he is quickly shaken by fighting against the Algerian military, whom he describes as his “brothers”, and decides to set up a swindle. Sedrati was eventually unmasked and discharged from the army. His superiors deemed him “capable of the worst”. Sedrati was subsequently committed to the psychiatric hospital in Nice for a nervous breakdown.

In 1958, having regained his freedom, Sedrati organized a fake tombola for the Algerian contingent, posing as a soldier. He cashed in the subscriptions in his own name. After being unmasked, Sedrati was committed to the Sarreguemines psychiatric hospital.

Released in 1959, Sedrati married for the first time in the early 1960s, but soon divorced.

=== Incarceration for fraud and internment ===
In 1962, at the age of 24, Sedrati's papers were withdrawn on the grounds that he was not a French citizen. So he decided to steal other people's identities to live and feed himself. He was arrested and remanded in custody for fraud, and underwent a psychiatric examination by Jacques Leyrie, who declared him responsible for his actions. Sedrati was sentenced in 1963 by the Criminal Court for fraud.

After his release from prison, Sedrati was subsequently sentenced to twenty prison terms for theft, forgery and fraud. To avoid various criminal sanctions, Sedrati was regularly committed to a psychiatric hospital. One of his “mental anomalies” is, according to Sedrati: “protection from extraterrestrial attacks, by spraying himself with honey”. However, some opinions are mixed as to his criminal responsibility, while others go so far as to say that he is not criminally responsible.

In 1969, Sedrati struck up a relationship with a woman of Algerian origin. Wishing to marry her, he decided to accompany her to Algeria to meet her parents-in-law. Sedrati's future in-laws, however, reject this “presumed Algerian, named Dominique, uncircumsized and not speaking a word of Arabic”. Sedrati couldn't stand the prejudice of his future in-laws, who claimed he wasn't from Algeria, and decided to end the relationship.

In the early 1970s, Sedrati was expelled from France and forced to live in Algeria. However, he managed to return to France, where he became a naturalized French citizen in 1981.

In 1982, after another psychiatric internment, Sedrati met André Gachy, a 43-year-old retired teacher suffering from a nervous breakdown. Following his release, Sedrati asked Gachy if he could move in with him to avoid being left alone. Gachy accepts Sedrati's offer of company and invites him to his home in La Verrière.

== Disappearances ==
=== André Gachy ===
On 19 May 1982, Sedrati and Gachy went on vacation in Thonon-les-Bains, resting at a local resort for a few days before leaving. At one point, however, Gachy vanished without a trace, but strangely, Sedrati did not report his disappearance to authorities and instead started using his friend's identity papers and checkbook, as well as living at his residences in La Verrière and Saintes. As he was an adult with few friends other than Sedrati, no investigation took place to investigate the man's disappearance.

In the summer of 1982, an employee of a shop in La Rochelle noticed that Sedrati was fraudulently buying products using a fake identity and reported him to the police. After his arrest, investigators learned that the scamming techniques he had used were similar to the ones he had used in the past, and suspected that Gachy might have fallen victim to a homicide. In August of that year, in spite of his protests of innocence and the fact that Gachy's body had not been found, Sedrati was charged with murder and identity theft. He then spent the next three years and three months in prison, awaiting trial at the cour d'assises in Nancy.

Sedrati first appeared before the La Rochelle criminal court in September 1984, accused of swindling Gachy. The defense argued that Sedrati had never succeeded in obtaining French identity papers. The court granted him mitigating circumstances and sentenced him to three and a half years in prison.

On 25 November 1985, Sedrati's trial began before the Charente-Maritime Assize Court, for the alleged murder of Gachy. During the two-day trial, Sedrati still claimed to have impersonated Gachy, but denied having killed the pensioner, claiming that he was a “simple swindler”. In fact, one of the stumbling blocks in the case against Sedrati is the absence of the missing man's body. Sedrati's arguments work in his favor, given his history of fraud. On second day, the trial began. The public prosecutor demanded a life sentence for the accused, but as there was little evidence to convict him, Sedrati was instead acquitted of all charges and released.

In 1993, Sedrati impersonated a man by the name of Joël Royer, and then another man by the name of Vosger, using both identities intermittently to avoid detection.

=== Léon Krauss ===
In October 1994, 62-year-old Léon Krauss, a pensioner living by himself at an apartment in Villeneuve-Saint-Georges, mysteriously vanished. His disappearance went unnoticed at first and allowed Sedrati to settle into his apartment and use his identity papers and bank accounts. Soon after, the building's janitor received a letter, supposedly written by Krauss, in which he claimed to have rented his apartment to Sedrati. One of Krauss' cousins also received a letter, in which it was claimed that Krauss had left the region to start a new life with a woman by the name of Colette.

On 24 December, Sedrati went to the police station in Strasbourg and, pretending to be Krauss, asked that they inform his "family" to stop pestering him before he abruptly left. Approximately four months later, Krauss' family members alerted the police, claiming that the man who claimed to be their relative was an impostor and that the letters' handwriting did not match. At their request, they were provided with a photograph of the man, whom they recognized as Sedrati. This alerted the authorities, as they had previously dealt with him not only due to his various acts of fraud but also his acquittal in the supposed murder of his friend years prior.

In February 1995, the Strasbourg police went to Krauss's apartment to find out more about this mysterious occupant, whom they recognized as the person who had made the statement. They take him into custody and search Krauss's apartment, where they find the missing man's papers and accounts, as well as those of Grossiord and Royer. Using a recent photograph, the man in custody was identified as Nadir Sedrati, aged 57, known to the police for various frauds. After admitting his identity, Sedrati stated that he had assumed the identities of Krauss, Grossiord and Royer in order to support himself financially. At the end of his police custody, Sedrati was indicted for fraud against Royer and Grossiord, as well as for “kidnapping and confinement” accompanied by fraud against Krauss. He is remanded to Strasbourg prison.

Later in this year, Sedrati appeared before the Strasbourg Criminal Court, charged with impersonating Grossiord and Royer. He was found guilty of fraud in a state of “legal recidivism” and sentenced to 5 years' imprisonment. The investigation into Krauss's disappearance continues against Sedrati, who formally denies having killed the pensioner. Excavations were carried out in an attempt to find the body of the missing man, but to no avail. Investigators working on the case are convinced that Krauss was murdered by Sedrati, as the suspect had already been prosecuted for the same offence a few years earlier. Sedrati's case for the alleged murder of Léon Krauss (whose body was never found) was dismissed. However, he was referred to the criminal court for impersonation, before being transferred to the Saint-Mihiel detention center.

On 19 February 1998, Sedrati appeared before the Créteil Criminal Court on a charge of fraud against Krauss, and was sentenced to 5 years' imprisonment. During his detention at the Saint-Mihiel detention center, Sedrati worked as a hairdresser and met other inmates, with whom he exchanged various confidences.

=== Release and association with Gassen and Steil ===
On 16 March 1999, Sedrati was paroled. Almost immediately after his release, he resumed using the name of Royer in order to obtain cyanide, before moving into the home of a man named Jean Stauffer in Nancy, to whom he presented himself as "Philippe Grossiord". In April of that year, he bought a woodchipper and reconnected with Gassen and Steil, both of whom had also been released from prison by then. At that time, Gassen lived and worked in Germany while Steil worked as a delivery driver for a hostel in Strasbourg.

Three weeks later, Sedrati made a contract with Steil using his Grossiord alias, in which the latter would work at a fictitious company named 'Inter Europe Diffusion'. Not realizing that Grossiord was Sedrati, Steil accepted the offer and made arrangements to travel to Nancy.

== Murders ==
On 14 May 1999, Steil boarded a train bound for Nancy, telling his family that he was going for a job interview and would be back three days later. Once he arrived at the location provided by his new "employer", Steil immediately recognized Sedrati, who offered him to spend the evening at his place to celebrate their reunion. While he was distracted, Sedrati poured potassium cyanide into a cup of coffee and served it to Steil, who quickly succumbed to its poisonous effects.

Once he confirmed that he was dead, Sedrati spent the next several hours dismembering his body, before loading the remains into his vehicle and disposing of them in the nearby canal. He then cleaned the entire apartment to erase any evidence and called the hostel Steil was staying at, claiming that he would not be coming back as he had started working at his company.

Few days later, Gassen invited Sedrati to join him, Hans and Rosemarie Müller for a 55th birthday party at their apartment in Germany. At said party, Rosemarie gifted Gassen a yellow shirt as a birthday present, and for the rest of the night, the attendees partied until Sedrati said that he had to go back to his house in Nancy. On 21 May, at approximately 3 AM, Gassen left his home to meet Sedrati for some sort of business meeting. Müller, his roommate, was worried and contacted him by phone, but was only contacted hours later by Gassen, who by then had arrived at Sedrati's house, and assured him that he would call back later. In the meantime, Sedrati prepared a cup of coffee for Gassen, which he had secretly poisoned with potassium cyanide. Upon drinking it, the man collapsed and died within seconds. Not long after, a concerned Müller called on Sedrati's cellphone and insisted that he talk to his roommate, but Sedrati said that he was resting at the moment. After hearing this response, Müller suggested that he give some coffee to Gassen, to which their mutual friend responded that he had already done so. Relieved by his response, Müller ended the call, allowing Sedrati to proceed with dismembering the remains, which he then threw into the canal.

A day later, fearing that something might have happened to Gassen, Müller decided to report his disappearance to the police. However, as Gassen was an adult and had only been missing for 24 hours, the report was not taken seriously and was eventually dismissed altogether. During that time, Sedrati had managed to clean up his apartment and remove all traces of Gassen's DNA.

=== Discovery of the bodies ===
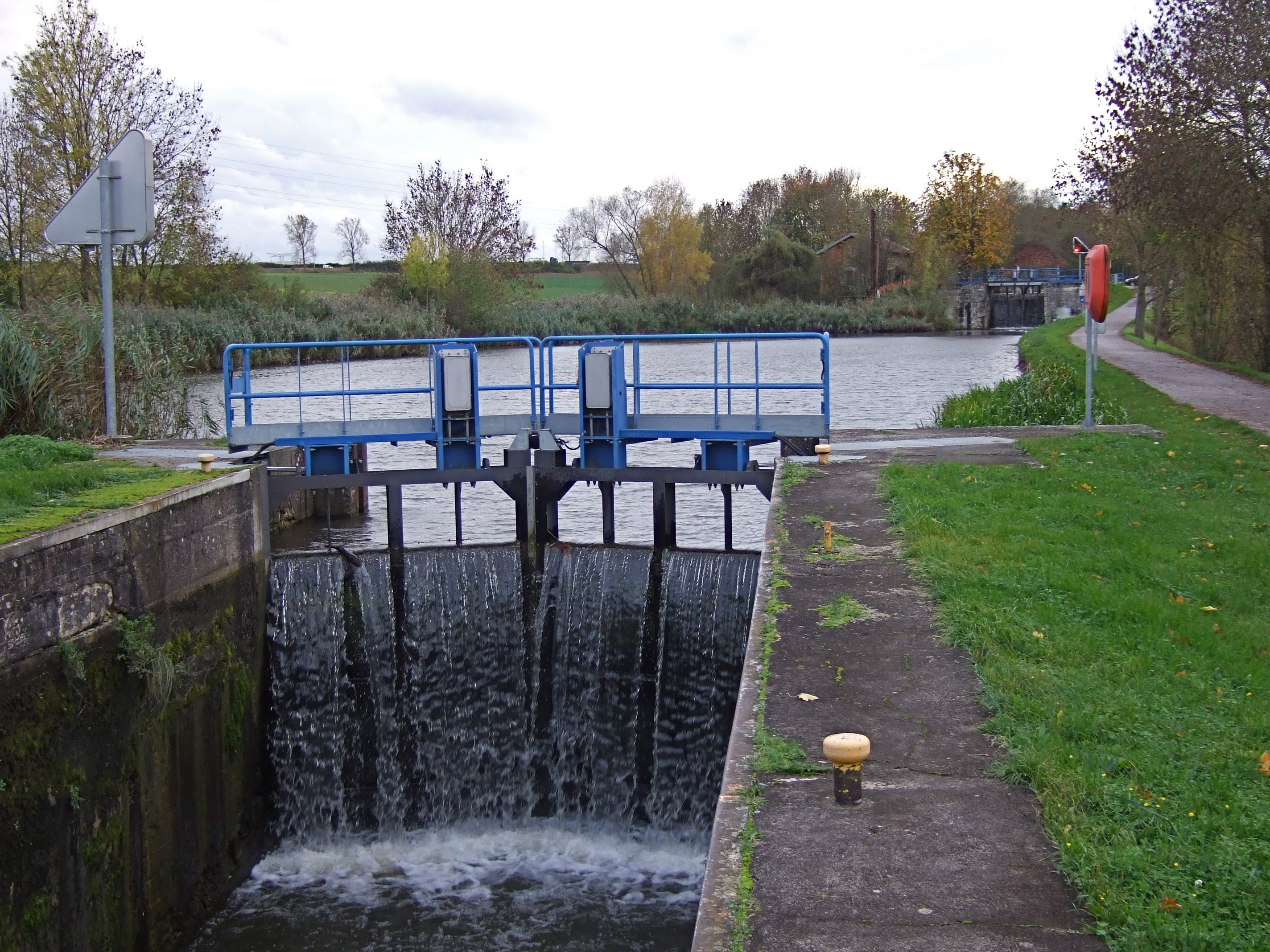
Approximate location of the crime scenes

On 30 May, a fisherman discovered a human right foot in the Nancy canal and immediately notified the police, who quickly arrived at the scene. At first, the officers believed that the foot might have been severed by a propeller. On the following day, a completely rotten and unrecognizable human head was found 500 meters away from where the foot had been found.

In early June, bones, a sternum, some ribs and three kneecaps were recovered from the canal, followed by a hand. Large body parts were recovered from the canal until 7 June, when the left foot of one of the victims was recovered. Three days later, a forensic pathologist concluded that all the body parts had been surgically removed, and thus concluded that the manner of death was homicidal in nature. However, as they were unable to obtain fingerprints due to the advanced state of decomposition, local authorities sent the hand for analysis in Paris.

=== Revelation ===
On 7 July, the hand was identified as belonging to German national Hans Gassen, who had been released from the Saint-Mihiel Detention Centre the previous year. Following the identification, they learned that he had lived with another German, Hans Müller, another ex-convict who had reported his friend missing on May 22, eight days before the remains were recovered from the canal. When questioned, Müller said that he had attempted to report his friend missing after he had not returned his calls for an entire day, but received no feedback from law enforcement.

At the same time, the police learned that Gassen was receiving numerous phone calls from two places: a home in Nancy and an apartment in the same city. On July 19, search of both properties revealed that a certain Philippe Grossiord had regularly called Gassen, with them realizing that it was an alias used by convicted fraudster and a former cellmate of the murder victim - Nadir Sedrati. In the meantime, sensing that the authorities were on his trail, Sedrati decided to change his modus operandi: again using the Grossiord alias, he contacted Ronfort and offered to sell him a motorhome through his fictitious company. As he had wanted to buy one, Ronfort accepted the offer and agreed to meet with the caller. However, upon discovering that the man was actually Sedrati, Ronfort was beaten to death and his skull crushed with a blade grinder before Sedrati hid his body in an unknown location. Ronfort's body has not been found to this day.

Ronfort's sudden disappearance was linked to Sedrati at this time by police, who planned to arrest him solely for Gassen's murder. In the meantime, Sedrati managed to dismember Ronfort's body and hide it, before proceeding to clean his residence to remove all traces of blood.

== Arrest and trial ==
On 21 July 1999, Nadir Sedrati was arrested as he was about to return to his home in Nancy, probably as he planned to get rid of his woodchipper. Meanwhile, Müller was also arrested by German police and sent to one of their police stations for interrogation.

While under interrogation by German police, Müller proved his innocence by providing phone records that showed that he was at home at the time of Gassen's disappearance. Sedrati, however, falsely claimed that Müller had killed Gassen, supposedly over an argument: according to his version, the three men were doing some sort of business deal with two Dutchmen and a Moroccan, and as he did not want to be involved, Sedrati on his way to leave when he heard Gassen and Müller engage in a bitter argument. When he went back to check out what was going on, he then supposedly saw Müller kill Gassen.

This story was not taken seriously by either French or German police, with the former issuing a search warrant on the apartment. When they arrived, they found a woodchipper, a kitchen knife, a butcher's saw and several brownish stains on the floor, sink and on the woodchipper itself. Furthermore, a more thorough inspection led to the discovery of a jar filled with mysterious white powder, which had been hidden inside a cushion. At first, it was believed that the powder was some kind of drug (either cocaine or heroin), but an analysis revealed that it was in fact potassium cyanide. Because of this, investigators constructed a theory that surmised that Sedrati likely poisoned Gassen and then dismembered his body with the instruments found at the apartment. However, the advanced state of decomposition still puzzled the authorities, who decided to search further. A closer inspection led to the discovery of quicklime in the basement: this led authorities to believe that Gassen's head was likely submerged in it so it could decompose at a faster rate.

On 23 July, after two days in police custody, Sedrati was charged with Gassen's murder and the murder of the man with the third kneecap. He professed his innocence while incarcerated, and police were unable to identify a motive beyond potentially stealing money, as Sedrati had withdrawn 300 francs using Gassen's credit card.

=== Discovery of the second body ===
At the end of July, the police were given the task of solving the mystery of who the remaining body parts were. Delving further into Sedrati's past, they learned that two of his acquaintances, Gérard Steil and Norbert Ronfort, had also gone missing. Believing that the body parts might belong to either of the two men, they contacted the family members and requested a DNA sample, which they successfully obtained after some complications.

While waiting for the results, investigators established that Steil was last seen alive on 14 May, when he was supposed to have a job interview with "Grossiord". They were again unable to establish a reasonable motive beyond the belief that Sedrati had killed Steil for his meagre pension. In September, DNA confirmed that the third kneecap found in the canal did indeed belong to Steil, and because of this, the police decided to dredge the entire canal in an attempt to find more remains. Their efforts were rewarded in November when more remains were indeed located. Because of this, Sedrati was charged with Steil's murder, which he also denied. Alongside this, authorities found the identity papers of Ronfort, which led them to believe that his remains were somewhere in the canal too.

=== Unsuccessful searches for the third and fourth bodies ===
Another investigation was launched in order to find Ronfort, who had been missing since 19 July and was last seen on a trip to buy a motorhome. By examining his phone calls, they learned that he planned to buy it from the same phoney company Sedrati had used to lure the previous victims. However, after two months of searching, they were unable to locate any remains, leading them to believe that Sedrati had hastily disposed of them due to his impending arrest.

On 22 March 2000, Sedrati was charged with Ronfort's murder. Although he denied all three murders, he was remanded to await trial in August 2001. While this was ongoing, investigations were reopened into the disappearance of Krauss, but as there was insufficient evidence to charge Sedrati with any crime, it was eventually dismissed.

== Trial ==
=== First instance ===
On 25 April 2002, Sedrati's trial began at the cour d'assises in Meurthe-et-Moselle. Throughout the proceedings, Sedrati continued to arrogantly proclaim that he was innocent of all charges, which was initially backed up by the fact that nothing incriminating was found on the shredder found in his kitchen. However, the blood found on the linoleum and on the sink quickly changed that, as it indicated that he did indeed kill his victims in the kitchen.

On 3 May 2002, Sedrati was found guilty on all counts and sentenced to life imprisonment. Still professing his innocence, he appealed the ruling.

=== Appeals trial ===
On 19 May 2003, Sedrati's appeal trial began before the cour d'assises in Metz. During the course of the proceedings, a dramatic turn of events occurred when a female prisoner who knew Ronfort claimed to have seen the man alive in 2000, over a year after Sedrati was arrested. As her testimony seemed genuine and in good faith, the claim was taken into consideration as possible evidence that Ronfort was still alive.

When it came to the psychiatric reports, experts stated that Sedrati had a "perverse, almost cannibalistic" personality and that he was a manipulator who enjoyed toying with people to the extent of simulating insanity by eating his own excrement and drinking his own urine. Jurors eventually disregarded the young woman's testimony when they learned that Ronfort's blood had been found in Sedrati's apartment, and because of this, he was found guilty yet again, receiving a life term with 22 years preventative detention.

Following his second trial, Sedrati filed an appeal to the Court of Cassation, which rejected his appeal on 7 October 2004. Since then, he has remained in prison but has been eligible for parole since July 2021.

== Advances in DNA ==
The 1990s were a big step for genetics, as it led to the rise of DNA. During the investigation, DNA and recent software made it possible to identify Gassen with the help of the Paris Forensic Center, later leading to the location and identification of additional evidence relating to Steil and Ronfort. The lack of such technologies was a crucial reason why Sedrati avoided imprisonment for his likely involvement in the disappearances of Gachy and Krauss, and because of this, attorney François Robinet has stated that he firmly believes Sedrati to be responsible. He has also said that Sedrati might have killed others between 1985 and 1995, and possibly even before 1982.

== See also ==
- List of serial killers by country

== TV documentaries ==
- "Nadir Sedrati, the cutter of the canal" in May 2005, March 2007 and July 2009 in Get the Accused presented by Christophe Hondelatte on France 2.
- "The Sedrati Affair, the detachment of the canal" December 1, 2010 in Criminal Investigations: the magazine of the facts on W9 rebroadcast in Criminal Records on Number 23.
- «Nadir Sédrati: The serial killer of the Nancy canal» in Crimes in the East on France 3.
