= Coffee preparation =

Process of turning coffee beans into a beverage

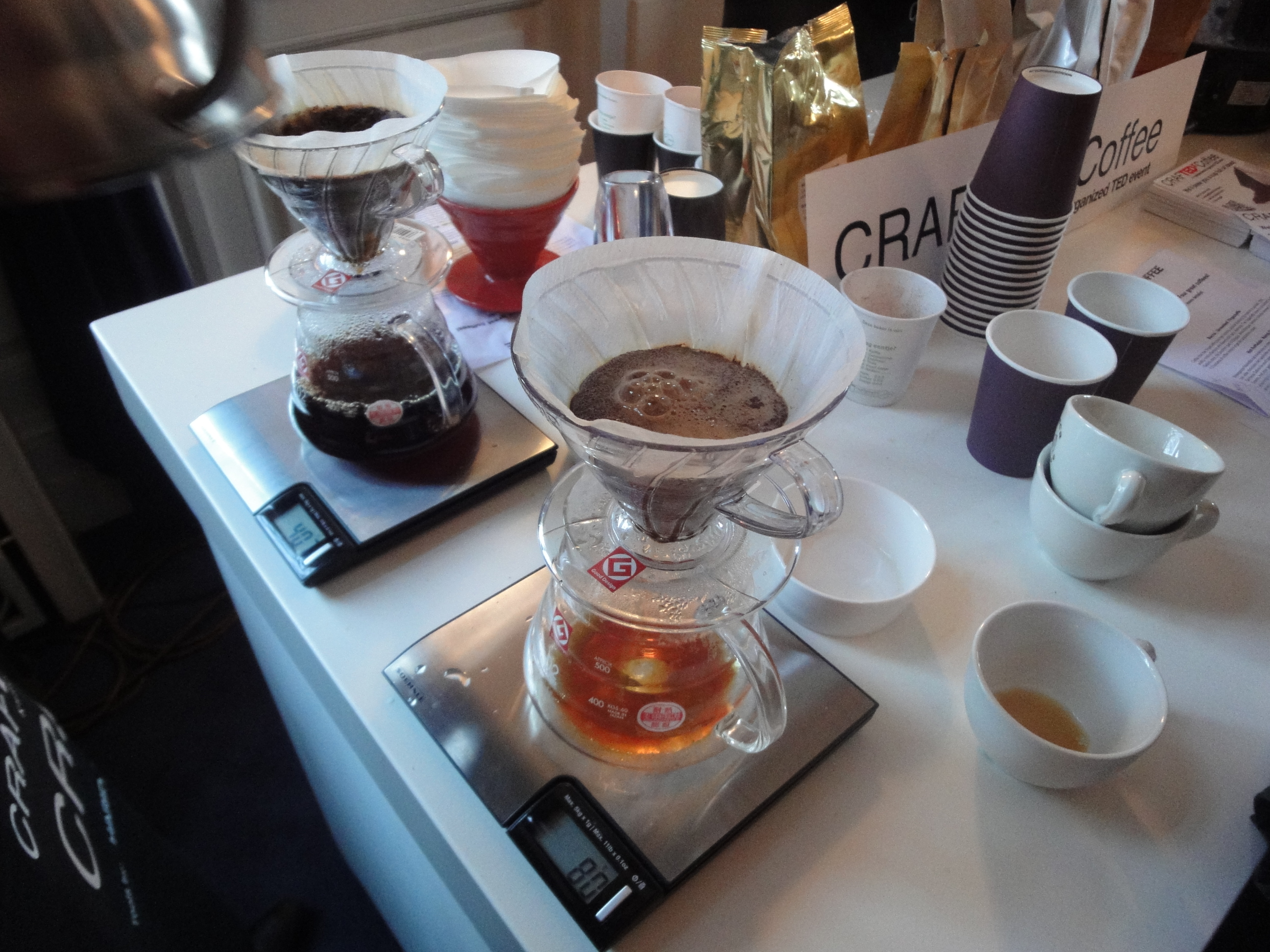
Filter coffee being brewed

Coffee preparation is the process of making liquid coffee using coffee beans. While the particular steps vary with the type of coffee and with the raw materials, the process includes four basic steps: raw coffee beans must be roasted, the roasted coffee beans must then be ground, and the ground coffee must then be mixed with hot or cold water (depending on the method of brewing) for a specific time (brewed), the liquid coffee extraction must be separated from the used grounds, and finally, if desired, the extracted coffee is combined with other elements of the desired beverage, such as sweeteners, dairy products, dairy alternatives, or toppings (such as shaved chocolate).

Key variables in coffee preparation include grind size, water temperature, brew time, and the ratio of coffee to water, all of which influence extraction and flavour.

Coffee is usually brewed hot, at close to the boiling point of water, immediately before drinking; if not consumed promptly, coffee is often sealed into a vacuum flask or insulated bottle to maintain its temperature.

In most areas, coffee may be purchased unprocessed, or already roasted, or already roasted and ground. Whole roast coffee or ground coffee is often vacuum-packed to prevent oxidation and lengthen its shelf life. Especially in hot climates, some find cold or iced coffee more refreshing. This can be prepared well in advance as it maintains its character when stored cold better than as a hot beverage.

Even with the same roast, the character of the extraction is highly dependent on distribution of particle sizes produced by the grinding process, temperature of the grounds after grinding, freshness of the roast and grind, brewing process and equipment, temperature of the water, character of the water itself, contact time with hot water (less sensitive with cold water), and the brew ratio employed. Preferred brew ratios of water to coffee often fall into the range of 15–18:1 by mass; even within this fairly small range, differences are easily perceived by an experienced coffee drinker. Processes can range from extremely manual (e.g. hand grinding with manual pour-over in steady increments) to totally automated by a single appliance with a reservoir of roast beans which it automatically measures and grinds, and water, which it automatically heats and doses. Another common style of automated coffee maker is fed a single-serving "pod" of pre-measured coffee grounds for each beverage.

Characteristics which may be emphasised or deemphasised by different preparation methods include: acidity (brightness), aroma (especially more delicate floral and citrus notes), mouthfeel (body), astringency, bitterness (both positive and negative), and the duration and intensity of flavour perception in the mouth (finish). The addition of sweeteners, dairy products (e.g. milk or cream), or dairy alternatives (e.g. almond milk) also changes the perceived character of the brewed coffee. Principally, dairy products mute delicate aromas and thicken mouthfeel (particularly when frothed), while sweeteners mask astringency and bitterness.

== Roasting ==
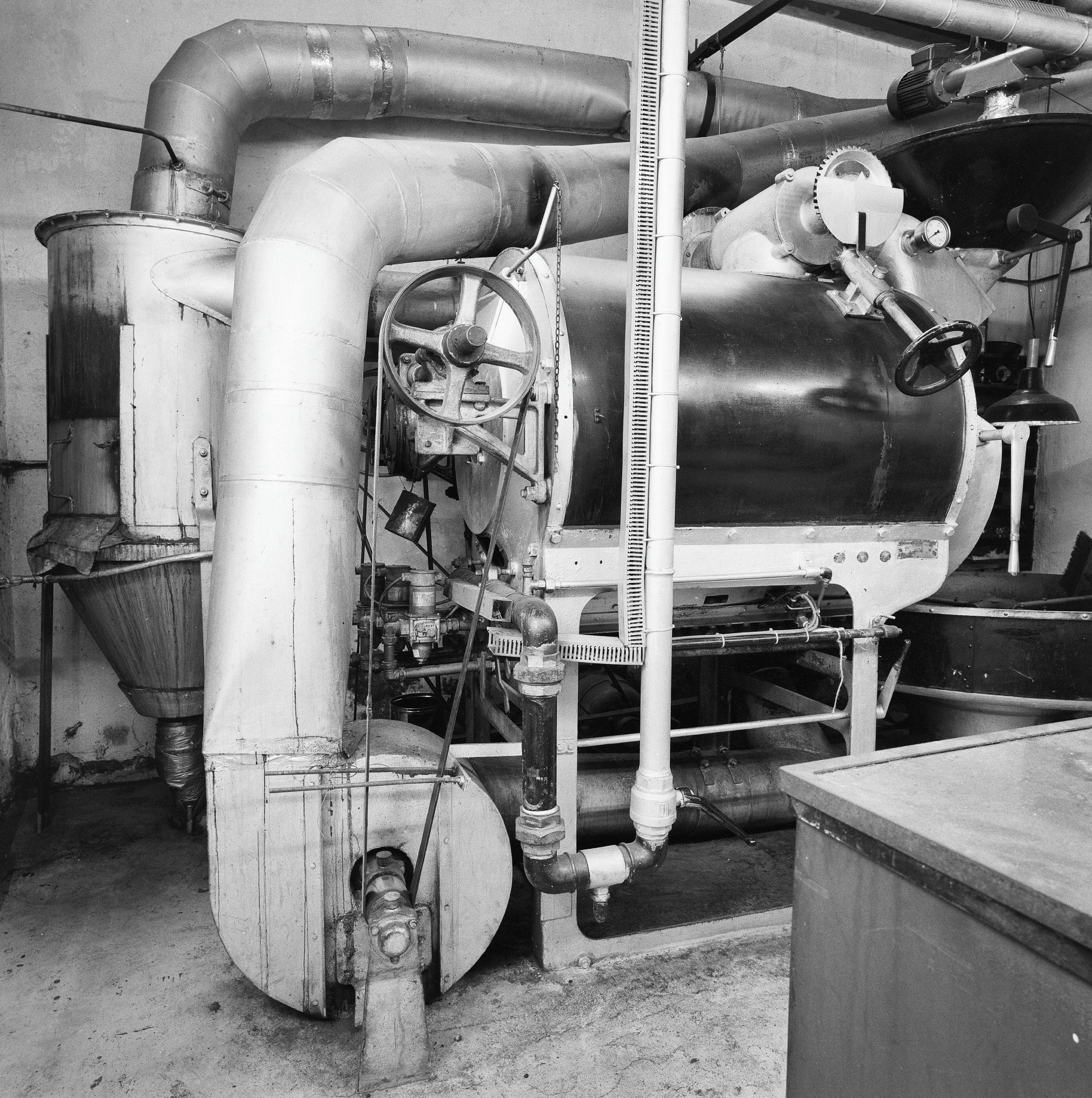
Dutch coffee-roasting machine, c. 1920

Roasting coffee transforms the chemical and physical properties of green coffee beans. When roasted, the green coffee bean expands to nearly double its original size, changing in colour and density. As the bean absorbs heat, its colour shifts to yellow, then to a light "cinnamon" brown, and then to a rich dark brown colour. During roasting, oils appear on the surface of the bean. The roast will continue to darken until it is removed from the heat source.

Coffee can be roasted with ordinary kitchen equipment (frying pan, grill, oven, popcorn popper) or by specialised appliances. A coffee roaster is a special pan or apparatus suitable to heat up and roast green coffee beans.

== Grinding ==
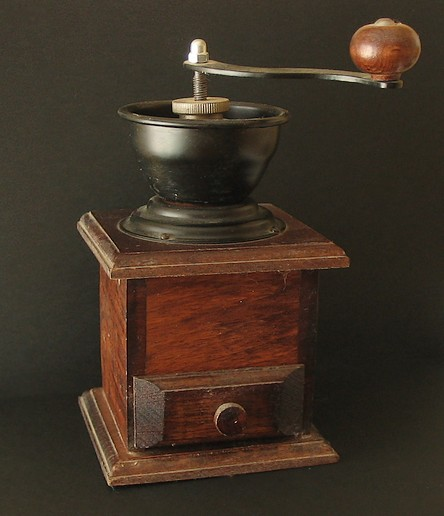
An old-fashioned manual burr-mill coffee grinder

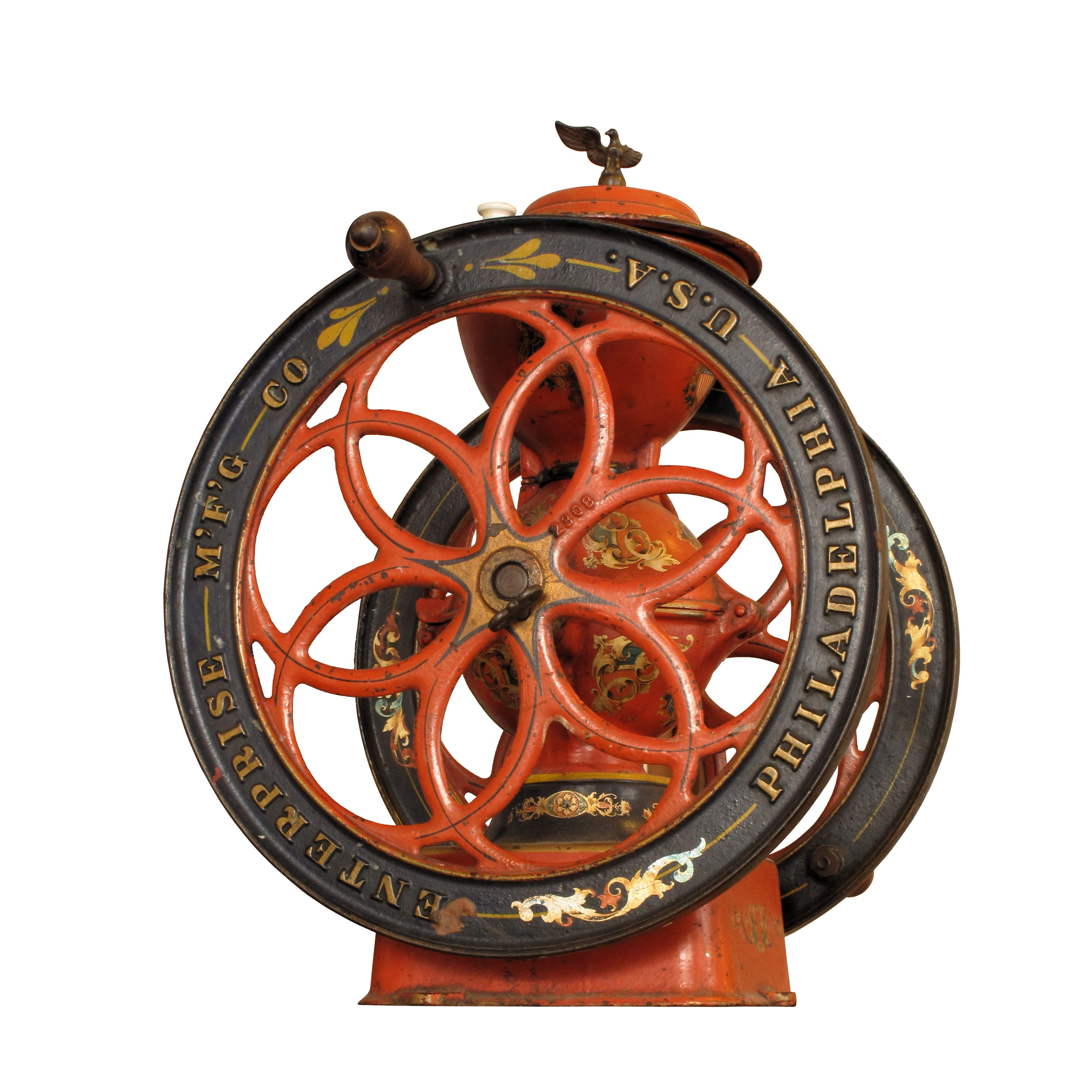
Wheel coffee grinder

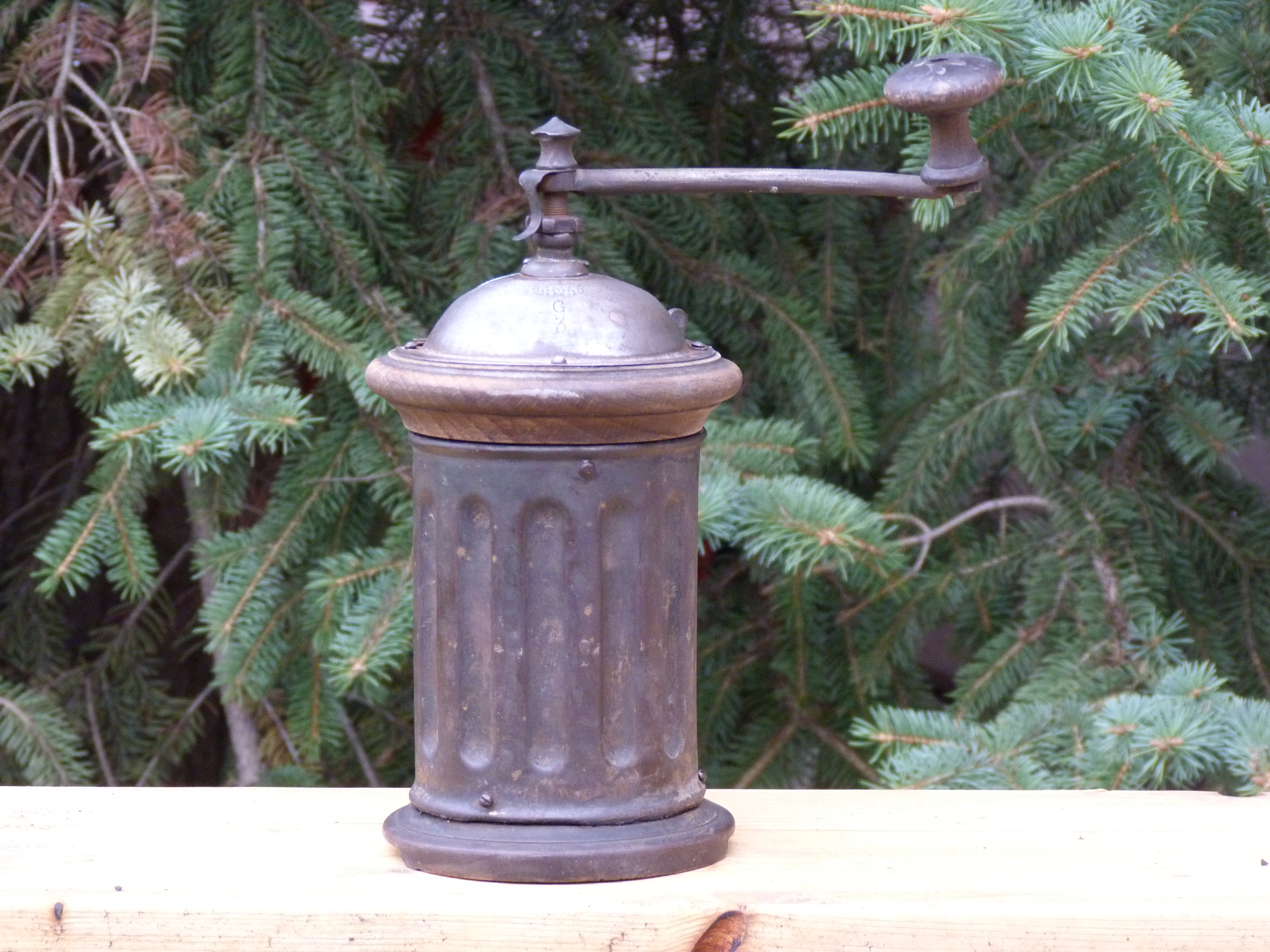
Coffee grinder

The whole coffee beans are ground, also known as milling, to facilitate the brewing process.

The fineness of the grind strongly affects brewing. Brewing methods that expose coffee grounds to heated water for longer require a coarser grind than faster brewing methods. Beans that are too finely ground for the brewing method in which they are used will expose too much surface area to the heated water and produce a bitter, harsh, "over-extracted" taste. At the other extreme, an overly coarse grind will produce weak coffee unless more is used. Due to the importance of a grind's fineness, a uniform grind is highly desirable.

If a brewing method is used in which the time of exposure of the ground coffee to the heated water is adjustable, then a short brewing time can be used for finely ground coffee. This produces coffee of equal flavour yet uses less ground coffee. A blade grinder does not cause frictional heat buildup in the ground coffee unless used to grind very large amounts as in a commercial operation. A fine grind allows the most efficient extraction but coffee ground too finely will slow down filtration or screening.

Ground coffee deteriorates faster than roasted beans because of the greater surface area exposed to oxygen. Many coffee drinkers grind the beans themselves immediately before brewing.

Used coffee grounds can be reused for hair care or skin care as well as in the garden. These can also be used as biodiesel fuel.

There are four methods of grinding coffee for brewing: burr-grinding, chopping, pounding, and roller grinding.

=== Burr-grinding ===
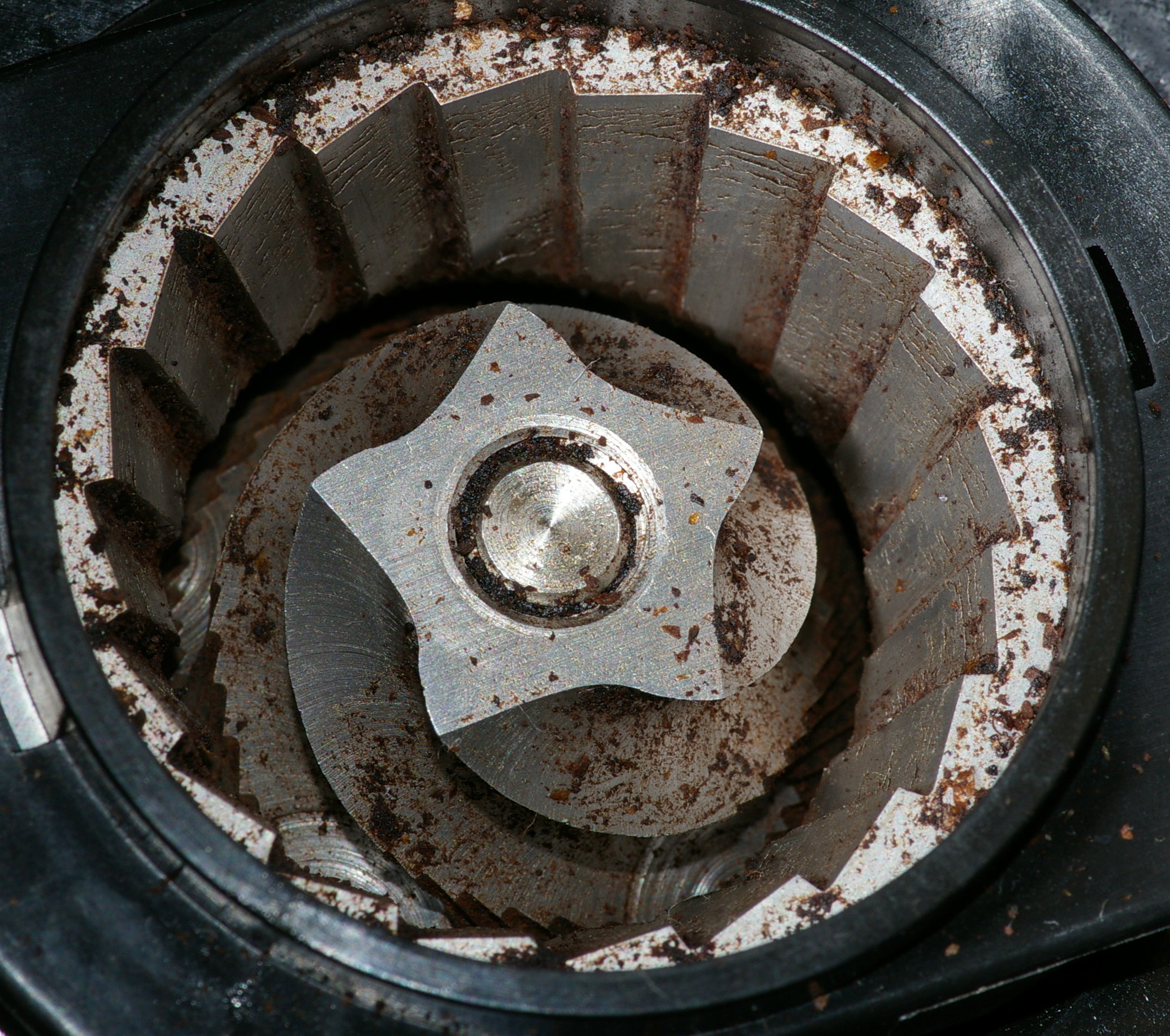
A burr grinder interior

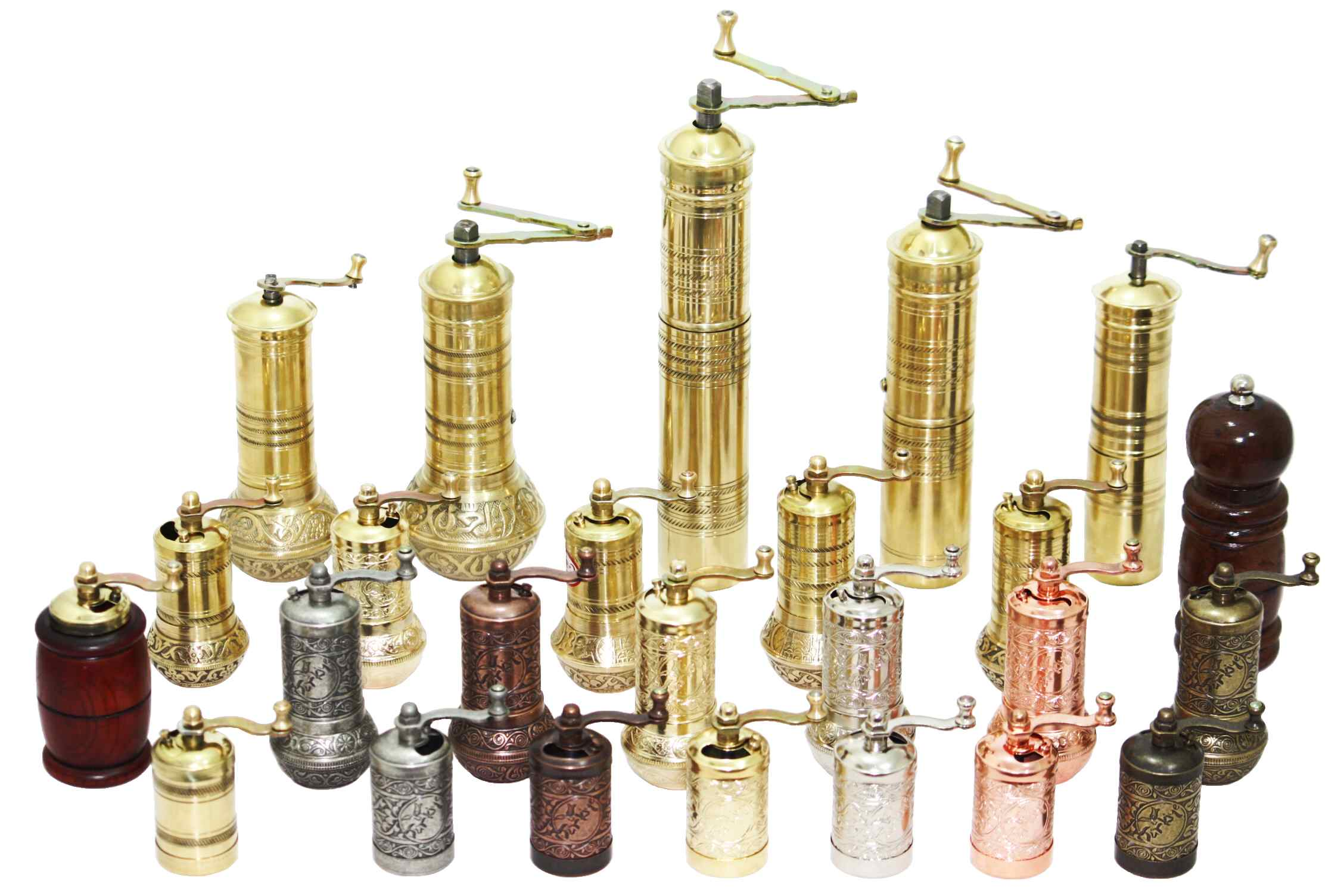
Greek manual coffee and pepper grinders

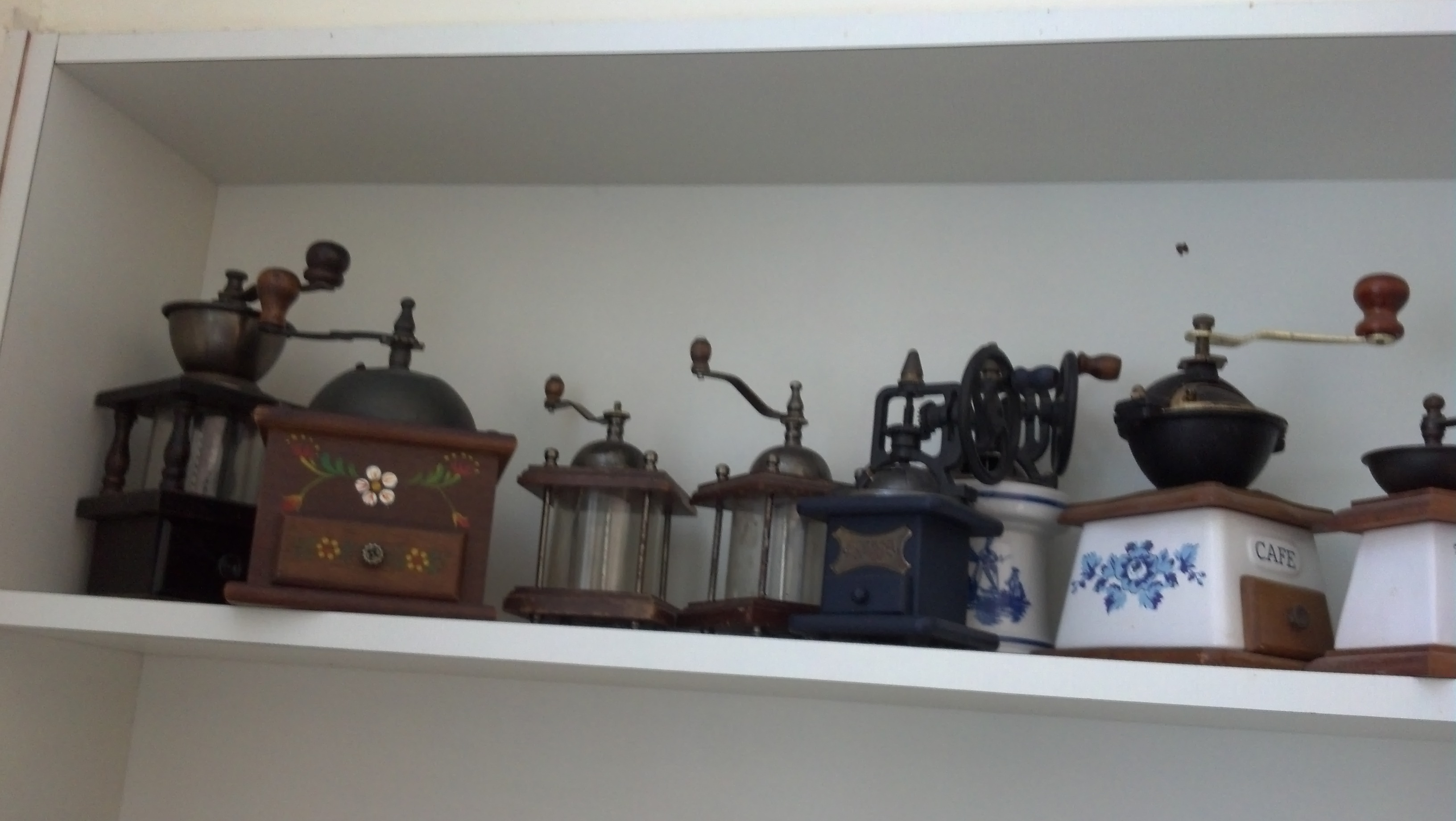
Various grinders for coffee and spices

Burr mills use two revolving abrasive elements, such as wheels or conical grinding elements made of stainless steel or ceramic, between which the coffee beans are crushed or "torn" with little frictional heating. The process of squeezing and crushing of the beans releases the coffee's oils, which are then more easily extracted during the infusion process with hot water, making the coffee taste richer and smoother.

Both manually and electrically powered mills are available. These mills grind the coffee to a fairly uniform size determined by the separation of the two abrasive surfaces between which the coffee is ground; the uniform grind produces a more even extraction when brewed, without excessively fine particles that clog filters.

These mills offer a wide range of grind settings, making them suitable to grind coffee for various brewing systems such as espresso, drip, percolators, French press, and others. Many burr grinders, including almost all domestic versions, are unable to achieve the extremely fine grind required for the preparation of Greek coffee; traditional Greek hand grinders are an exception.

Burr grinders are of two types - conical burrs and flat wheel burrs. Most manual coffee grinders use conical burrs, but there have been a number of exceptions recently using flat wheel burrs including ghost burrs and hybrid designs. Both of them grind coffee bean consistently and with uniform size. There are also burr grinders, including a few manual coffee grinders, utilising two burr sets for prebreaking and fine-grinding in order to sieve out coffee chaff, potentially work as slow feeders, achieve more uniform coffee grinds, and, in the case of manual grinders, ease operation or improve through-put. Many electrical burr grinders offer larger hoppers for storing whole coffee beans and can be used with a portafilter for espresso grind.

=== Chopping ===
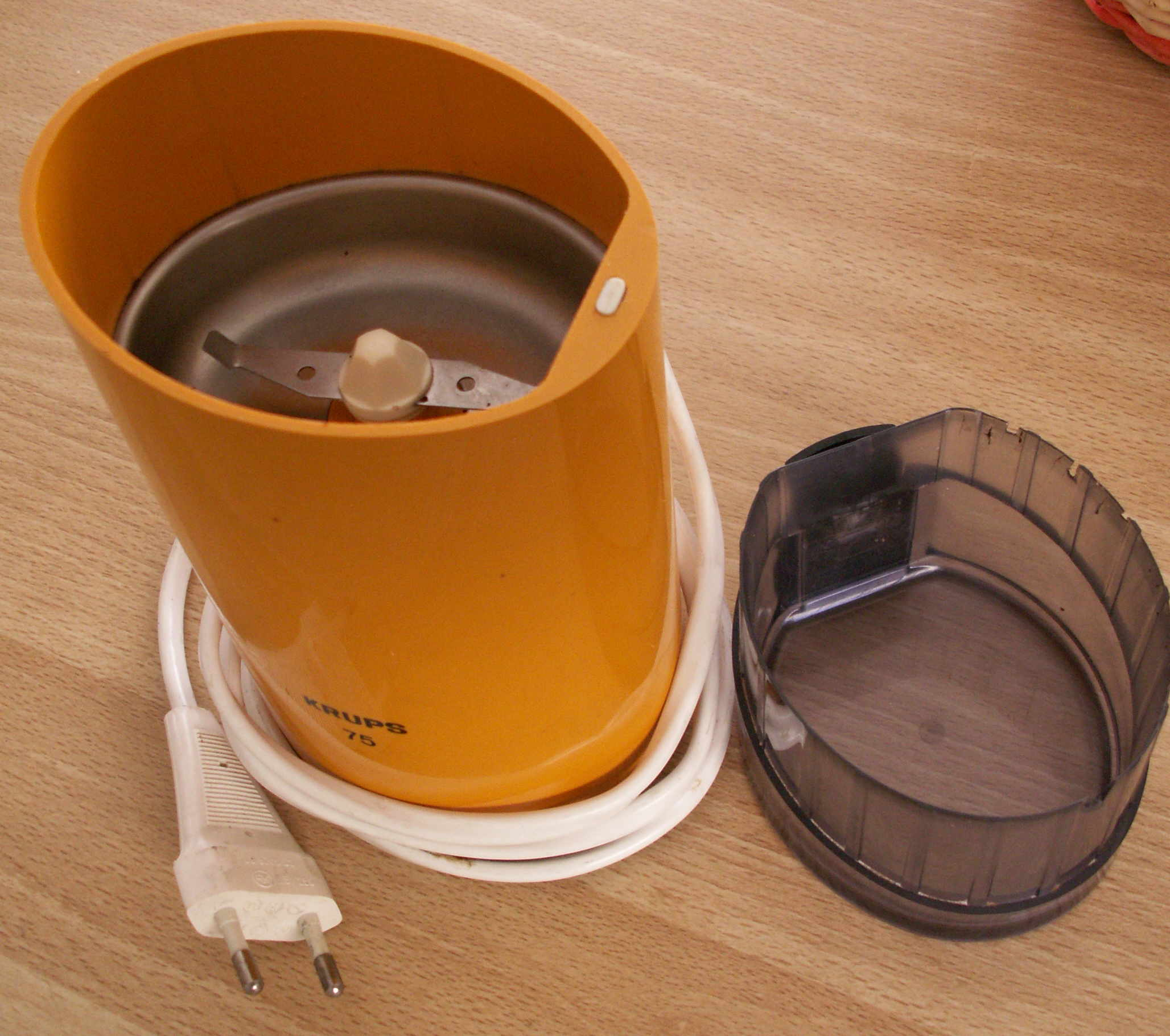
A blade or propeller grinder

Coffee beans can be chopped by using blades rotating at high speed (20,000 to 30,000 rpm), either in a blade grinder designed specifically for coffee and spices, or in a general use home blender. Devices of this sort are cheaper than burr grinders, but the grind is not uniform and will produce particles of widely varying sizes, while ideally all particles should have the same size, appropriate for the method of brewing. Moreover, the particles get smaller and smaller during the grinding process, which makes it difficult to achieve a consistent grind from batch to batch.

Blade grinders create "coffee dust" that can clog up sieves in espresso machines and French presses, and are best suited for drip coffee makers. They are not recommended for grinding coffee for use with pump espresso machines.

=== Pounding ===
Arabic coffee and Greek coffee require that the grounds be almost powdery in fineness, finer than can be achieved by most burr grinders. Pounding the beans with a mortar and pestle can pulverise the coffee finely enough.

=== Roller grinding ===
In a roller grinder, the beans are ground between pairs of corrugated rollers. A roller grinder produces a more even grind size distribution and heats the ground coffee less than other grinding methods. However, due to their size and cost, roller grinders are used exclusively by commercial and industrial scale coffee producers.

Water-cooled roller grinders are used for high production rates as well as for fine grinds such as Greek and espresso.

== Brewing ==
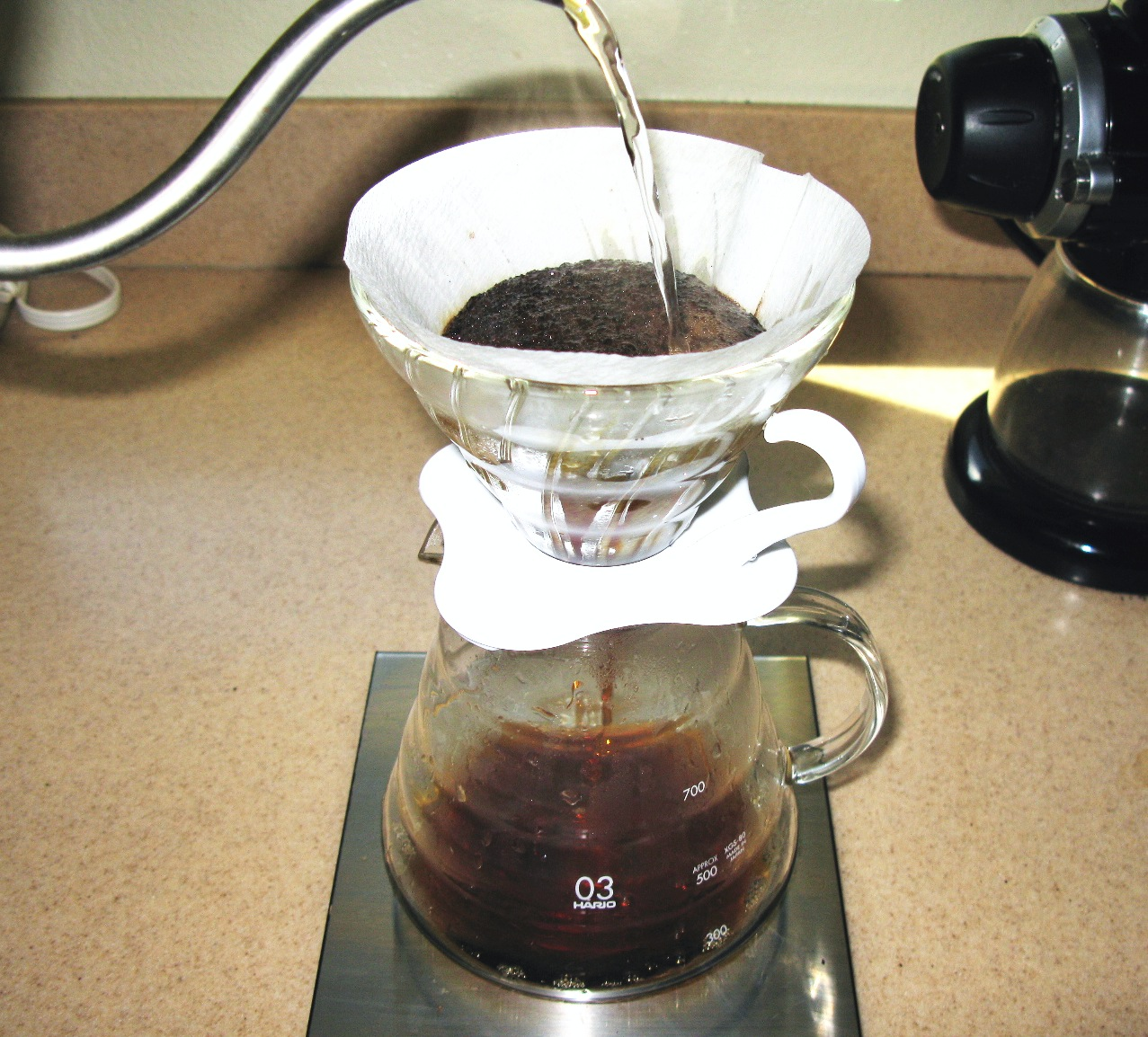
In a pour-over, the water passes through the coffee grounds, gaining soluble compounds to form coffee. Insoluble compounds remain within the coffee filter.

Coffee can be brewed in several different ways, but these methods fall into four main groups depending on how the water is introduced to the coffee grounds: decoction (through boiling), infusion (through steeping), gravitational feed (used with percolators and in drip brewing), or pressurised percolation (as with espresso).

Brewed coffee, if kept hot, will deteriorate rapidly in flavour, and reheating such coffee tends to give it a "muddy" flavour, as some compounds that impart flavour to coffee are destroyed if this is done. Even at room temperature, deterioration will occur; however, if kept in an oxygen-free environment it can last almost indefinitely at room temperature, and sealed containers of brewed coffee are sometimes commercially available in food stores in America or Europe, with refrigerated bottled coffee drinks being commonly available at convenience stores and grocery stores in the United States. Canned coffee is particularly popular in Japan and South Korea.

Electronic coffee makers boil the water and brew the infusion with little human assistance and sometimes according to a timer. Some such devices also grind the beans automatically before brewing.

The French press is one of the oldest and simplest methods of brewing coffee. Despite its straightforward design, the technique requires careful attention, particularly regarding steeping time; leaving the coffee in the press after plunging can lead to over-extraction and bitterness.

=== Boiling ===
Boiling, decoction or maceration, was the main method used for brewing coffee until the 1930s and is still used in some European and Middle Eastern countries. The aromatic oils in coffee are released at 96 °C (205 °F), which is just below boiling, while the bitter acids are released when the water has reached boiling point.

The simplest method is to put the ground coffee in a cup, pour hot water over it and let cool while the grounds sink to the bottom. This is a traditional method for making a cup of coffee that is still used in parts of Indonesia. This method, known as "mud coffee" in the Middle East owing to an extremely fine grind that results in a mud-like sludge at the bottom of the cup, allows for extremely simple preparation, but drinkers then have to be careful if they want to avoid drinking grounds either from this layer or floating at the surface of the coffee, which can be avoided by dribbling cold water onto the "floaters" from the back of a spoon. If the coffee beans are not ground finely enough, the grounds do not sink.

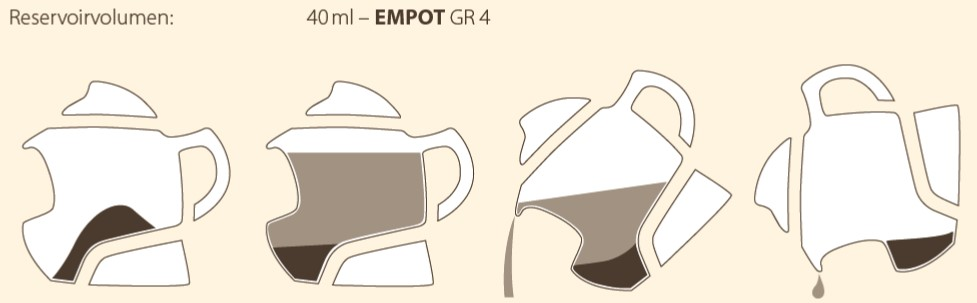
German Empot coffee maker

A modern variant of this method is utilised by the German Empot (2014), a specially formed porcelain coffee pot with a reservoir at its bottom to hold back the sunken coffee grounds when pouring the finished coffee.

"Cowboy coffee" is made by heating coarse grounds with water in a pot, letting the grounds settle and pouring off the liquid to drink, sometimes filtering it to remove fine grounds. While the name suggests that this method was used by cowboys, presumably on the trail around a campfire, it is used by others.

The above methods are sometimes used with hot milk instead of water.

Turkish coffee (aka Arabic coffee, etc.), a very early method of making coffee, is used in the Middle East, North Africa, East Africa, Turkey, Greece, the Balkans, and Russia. Very finely ground coffee, optionally sugar, and water are placed in a narrow-topped pot, called a cezve (Turkish), kanaka (Egyptian), briki (Greek), džezva (Štokavian) or turka (Russian) and brought to a boil then immediately removed from the heat. It may be very briefly brought to a boil two or three times. Turkish coffee is sometimes flavoured with cardamom, particularly in Arab countries. The resulting strong coffee, with foam on the top and a thick layer of grounds at the bottom, is drunk from small cups.

=== Steeping ===
A French press is a tall, narrow cylinder with a plunger that includes a metal or nylon fine mesh filter. The grounds are placed in the cylinder, and off-the-boil water is then poured into it. The coffee and hot water are left in the cylinder for a few minutes (typically 4–7 minutes) and then the plunger is gently pushed down, leaving the filter immediately above the grounds, allowing the coffee to be poured out while the filter retains the grounds. Depending on the type of filter, it is important to pay attention to the grind of the coffee beans, though a rather coarse grind is almost always called for. A plain glass cylinder may be used, or a vacuum flask arrangement to keep the coffee hot; this is not to be confused with a vacuum brewer—see below.

The Arndt'sche Caffee-Aufgussmaschine (c. 1900), the Kaffeeaufgußkanne Max Thürmer (1900), the Büttner-Kaffeemaschine (1926), the Melitta 401/402 (1930s) filter holders, the Morena Kaffeefilter (c. 1960s–1970s) and the Onko Kaffee-Filter (c. 1960s–1970s) were devices combining steeping (immersion) with drip-filtering (percolation), a method sometimes also called percolative immersion, immersion pour-over, immersion drip brew, hybrid brewing, steeped bloom or steep & release. Newer devices supporting this include the Clever Dripper (2009), the Bonavita Immersion Dripper (2014), the Goat Story GINA (2016), the December Dripper (2017), the Hario Switch (2019), the Melitta Amano (2020), the NextLevel Pulsar (2021), the Cuptimo (2022), and the Sworksdesign Bottomless Dripper (2023).

Coffee bags are used less often than tea bags. They are simply disposable bags containing coffee; the grounds do not exit the bag as it mixes with the water, so no extra filtering is required.

Malaysian and some Caribbean and South American styles of coffee are often brewed using a "sock," which is actually a simple muslin bag, shaped like a filter, into which coffee is loaded, then steeped in hot water. This method is especially suitable for use with local-brew coffees in Malaysia, primarily of the varieties Robusta and Liberica which are often strong-flavoured, allowing the ground coffee in the sock to be reused.

A vacuum brewer consists of two chambers: a pot below, atop which is set a bowl or funnel with its siphon descending nearly to the bottom of the pot. The bottom of the bowl is blocked by a filter of glass, cloth or plastic, and the bowl and pot are joined by a gasket that forms a tight seal. Water is placed in the pot, the coffee grounds are placed in the bowl, and the whole apparatus is set over a burner. As the water heats, it is forced by the increasing vapor pressure up the siphon and into the bowl where it mixes with the grounds. When all the water possible has been forced into the bowl the infusion is allowed to sit for some time before the brewer is removed from the heat. As the water vapor in the lower pot cools, it contracts, forming a partial vacuum and drawing the coffee down through the filter.

=== Filtration methods ===
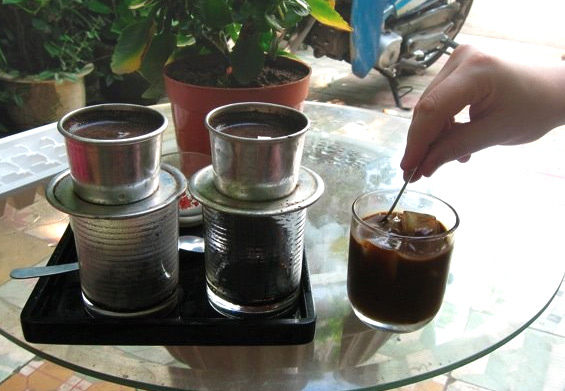
Single serve Vietnamese drip filter

Drip coffee maker

Drip brew coffee, also known as filtered coffee, is made by letting hot water drip onto coffee grounds held in a coffee filter surrounded by a filter holder or brew basket. Drip brew makers can be simple filter holder types manually filled with hot water, or they can use automated systems as found in the popular electric drip coffee-maker. Strength varies according to the ratio of water to coffee and the fineness of the grind, but is typically weaker in taste and contains a lower concentration of caffeine than espresso, though often (due to size) more total caffeine. By convention, regular coffee brewed by this method is served by some restaurants in a brown or black pot (or a pot with a brown or black handle), while decaffeinated coffee is served in an orange pot (or a pot with an orange handle). A variation is the traditional Neapolitan flip coffee pot, or Napoletana, a drip brew coffee maker for the stovetop. It consists of a bottom section filled with water, a middle filter section, and an upside-down pot placed on the top. When the water boils, the coffee maker is flipped over to let the water filter through the coffee grounds.

The common electric percolator, which was in almost universal use in the United States prior to the 1970s, and is still popular in some households today, differs from the pressure percolator described above. It uses the pressure of the boiling water to force it to a chamber above the grounds, but relies on gravity to pass the water down through the grounds, where it then repeats the process until shut off by an internal timer. Some coffee aficionados hold the coffee produced in low esteem because of this multiple-pass process. Others prefer gravity percolation and claim it delivers a richer cup of coffee in comparison to drip brewing.

Indian filter coffee uses an apparatus typically made of stainless steel. There are two cylindrical compartments, one sitting on top of the other. The upper compartment has tiny holes (less than ~0.5 mm). And then there is the pierced pressing disc with a stem handle, and a covering lid. The finely ground coffee with 15–20% chicory is placed in the upper compartment, the pierced pressing disc is used to cover the ground coffee, and hot water is poured on top of this disk. Unlike the regular drip brew, the coffee does not start pouring down immediately. This is because of the chicory, which holds on to the water longer than just the ground coffee beans can. This causes the beverage to be much more potent than the American drip variety. 2–3 teaspoonfuls of this decoction is added to a 100–150 ml milk. Sugar is then sometimes added by individual preference.

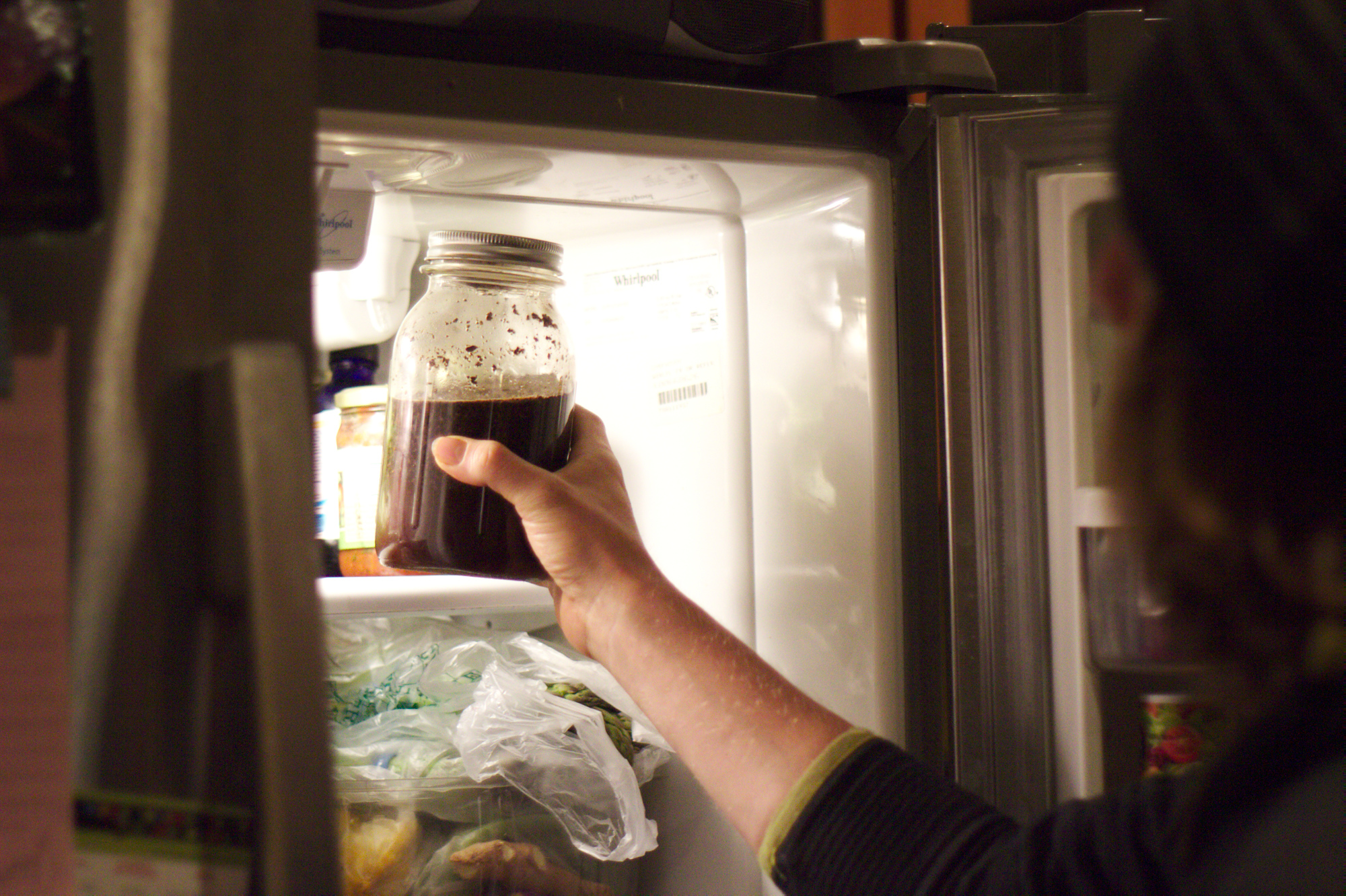
Allow cold brew to steep for 8 to 24 hours.

Another variation is cold brew coffee, sometimes known as "cold press". Cold water is poured over coffee grounds and allowed to steep for eight to twenty-four hours. The coffee is then filtered, usually through a very thick filter, removing all particles. This process produces a very strong concentrate which can be stored in a refrigerated, airtight container for up to eight weeks. The coffee can then be prepared for drinking by adding cold water to a glass with the concentrate prepared, with a 1:1 ratio, or a 2:1 ratio of concentrate to water, if the drinker prefers it bolder tasting. The coffee prepared by this method is very low in acidity with a smooth taste, and is often preferred by those with sensitive stomachs. Others, however, feel this method strips coffee of its bold flavour and character. Thus, this method is not common, and there are few appliances designed for it.

The amount of coffee used affects both the strength and the flavour of the brew in a typical drip-brewing filtration-based coffee maker. The softer flavours come out of the coffee first and the more bitter flavours only after some time, so a large brew will tend to be both stronger and more bitter. This can be modified by stopping the filtration after a planned time and then adding hot water to the brew instead of waiting for all the water to pass through the grounds.

In addition to the "cold press", there is a method called "Cold Drip Coffee". Also known as "Dutch Ice Coffee" (and very popular in Japan), instead of steeping, this method very slowly drips cold water into the grounds, which then very slowly pass through a filter. Unlike the cold press (which functions similar to a French Press) which takes eight to twenty-four hours, a Cold Drip process only takes about two hours, with taste and consistency results similar to that of a cold press.

=== Pressure ===
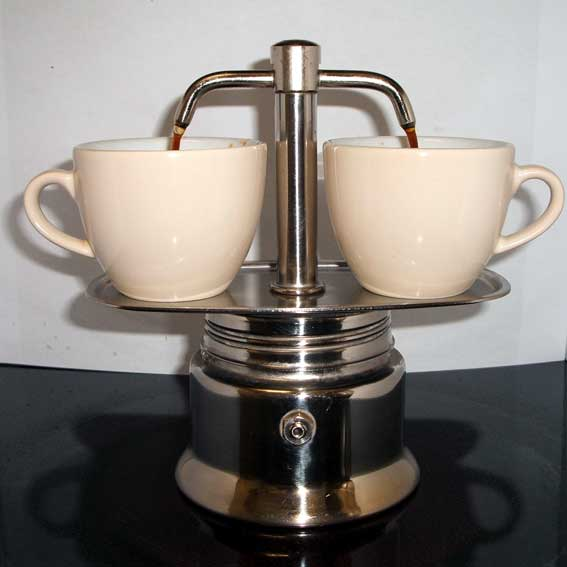
A variation on the moka pot with the upper section formed as a coffee fountain

Espresso is made by forcing hot water at 91–95 °C (196–203 °F) under a pressure of between 8 and 18 bar (800 and 1,800 kPa; 120 and 260 psi), through a lightly packed matrix, called a "puck," of finely ground coffee. The 30–60 millilitres (1.1–2.1 imp fl oz) beverage is served in demitasse cups; sugar is often added. It is consumed during the day at cafes and from street vendors, or after an evening meal. It is the basis for many coffee drinks. It is one of the most concentrated forms of coffee regularly consumed, with a distinctive flavour provided by crema, a layer of flavourful emulsified oils in the form of a colloidal foam floating on the surface, which is produced by the high pressure. Espresso is more viscous than other forms of brewed coffee.

The moka pot, also known as the "Italian coffeepot" or the "caffettiera," is a three-chamber design which boils water in the lower section. The generated steam pressure, about one bar (100 kPa, 14.5 psi), forces the boiling water up through coffee grounds held in the middle section, separated by a filter mesh from the top section. The resultant coffee (almost espresso strength, but without the crema) is collected in the top section. Moka pots usually sit directly on a stovetop heater or burner. Some models have a transparent glass or plastic top.

Single-serving coffee machines force hot water under low pressure through a coffee pod composed of finely ground coffee sealed between two layers of filter paper or through a proprietary capsule containing ground coffee. Examples include the pod-based Senseo and Home Café systems and the proprietary Tassimo and Keurig K-Cup systems.

The AeroPress a mechanical, non-electronic device where pressure is simply exerted by the user manually pressing a piston down with their hand, forcing medium-temperature water through coffee grounds in about 30 seconds (into a single cup.) This method produces a smoother beverage than espresso, falling somewhere between the flavour of a moka pot and a French Press.

== Extraction ==
Proper brewing of coffee requires using the correct amount of coffee grounds, extracted to the correct degree (largely determined by the correct time), at the correct temperature using the water of balanced mineral composition. SCAA defines a precise composition of water for the barista championships.

More technically, coffee brewing consists of dissolving (solvation) soluble flavours from the coffee grounds in water. Specialised vocabulary and guidelines exist to discuss this, primarily various ratios, which are used to optimally brew coffee. The key concepts are:

Extraction
Also known as "solubles yield" – what percentage (by weight) of the grounds are dissolved in the water.
Strength
Also known as "solubles concentration", as measured by Total Dissolved Solids – how concentrated or watery the coffee is.
Brew ratio
The ratio of coffee grounds (mass, in grams or ounces) to water (volume, in litres or half-gallons): how much coffee is used for a given quantity of water.

These are related as follows:

Strength ∝ Brew ratio × Extraction

which can be analysed as the following formula:

dissolved solids/water = grounds/water × dissolved solids/grounds

A subtler issue is which solubles are dissolved – this depends both on solubility of different substances at different temperatures, and changes over the course of extraction. Different substances are extracted during the first 1% of brewing time than in the period from 19% extraction to 20% extraction. This is primarily affected by temperature.

External images
- SCAA brew chart (American)
- SCAE brew chart (European)
- NCA brew chart (Norwegian)

Brewing guidelines are summarised by Brewing Control Charts which graph these elements, and centre around an "ideal" rectangle indicating the target brewing range. The yield in the horizontal (x-axis), the strength is the vertical (y-axis), and a given brewing ratio determines a radial line, since for a giving brewing ratio the strength is directly proportional to the yield.

Ideal yield is widely agreed to be 20±2% (18–22%), while ideal strength for brewed coffee varies. American standards for "ideal strength" are generally considered to be between 1.25±0.10% (1.15–1.35%), while Norwegian standards are about 1.40±0.10% (1.30–1.50%). European standards fall in the middle range at 1.20–1.45%.

These are most easily achieved with a brewing ratio of 55 g/L (55 grams of coffee per litre of water) for American standards, to 63 g/L in Norwegian standards, yielding approximately 14–16 grams of coffee for a standard 240 ml (8.1 US fl oz) cup. These guidelines apply regardless of brewing method, with the following exceptions:

- Espresso is significantly different – it is much stronger, and has more varied extraction. Seven grams of grounds are used to make a 25 ml shot of espresso (this comes to 280 g/L, but the amount of water used is actually more than 25 ml because some stays with the grounds). Espresso has about 212 mg caffeine per 100 g as compare to around 40 mg per 100 g of normal coffee.
- Dark roast coffee tastes subjectively stronger than medium roasts. Standards are based on medium roasts, and the equivalent strength for a dark roast requires using a lower brewing ratio.

== Separation ==
Coffee in all these forms is made with roasted and ground coffee and hot water, the used grounds either remaining behind or being filtered out of the cup or jug after the main soluble compounds have been extracted. The fineness of grind required differs for the various brewing methods.

=== Gallery of common brewing methods ===
Pressure:

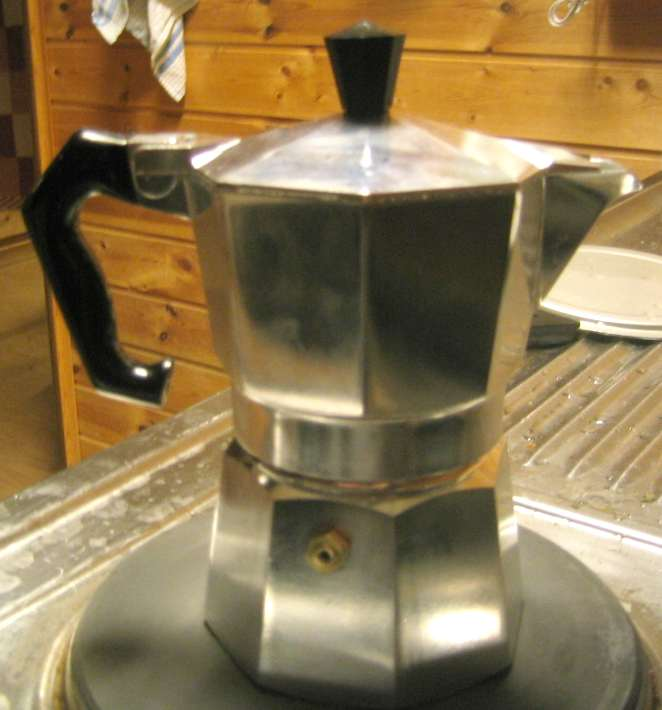
Moka pot

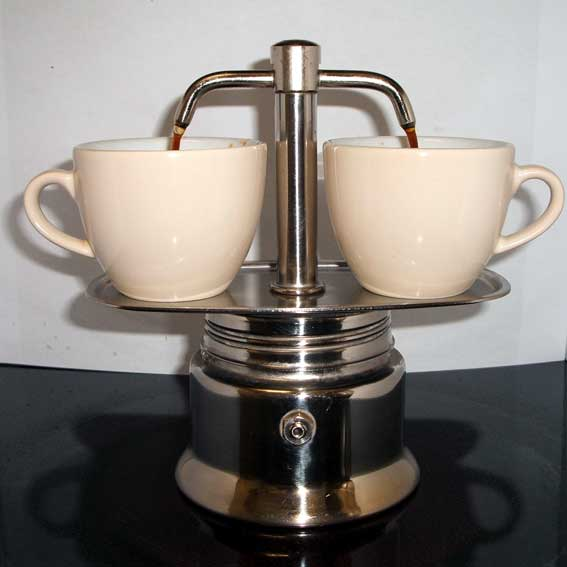
Moka 2 Cup Coffee Fountain

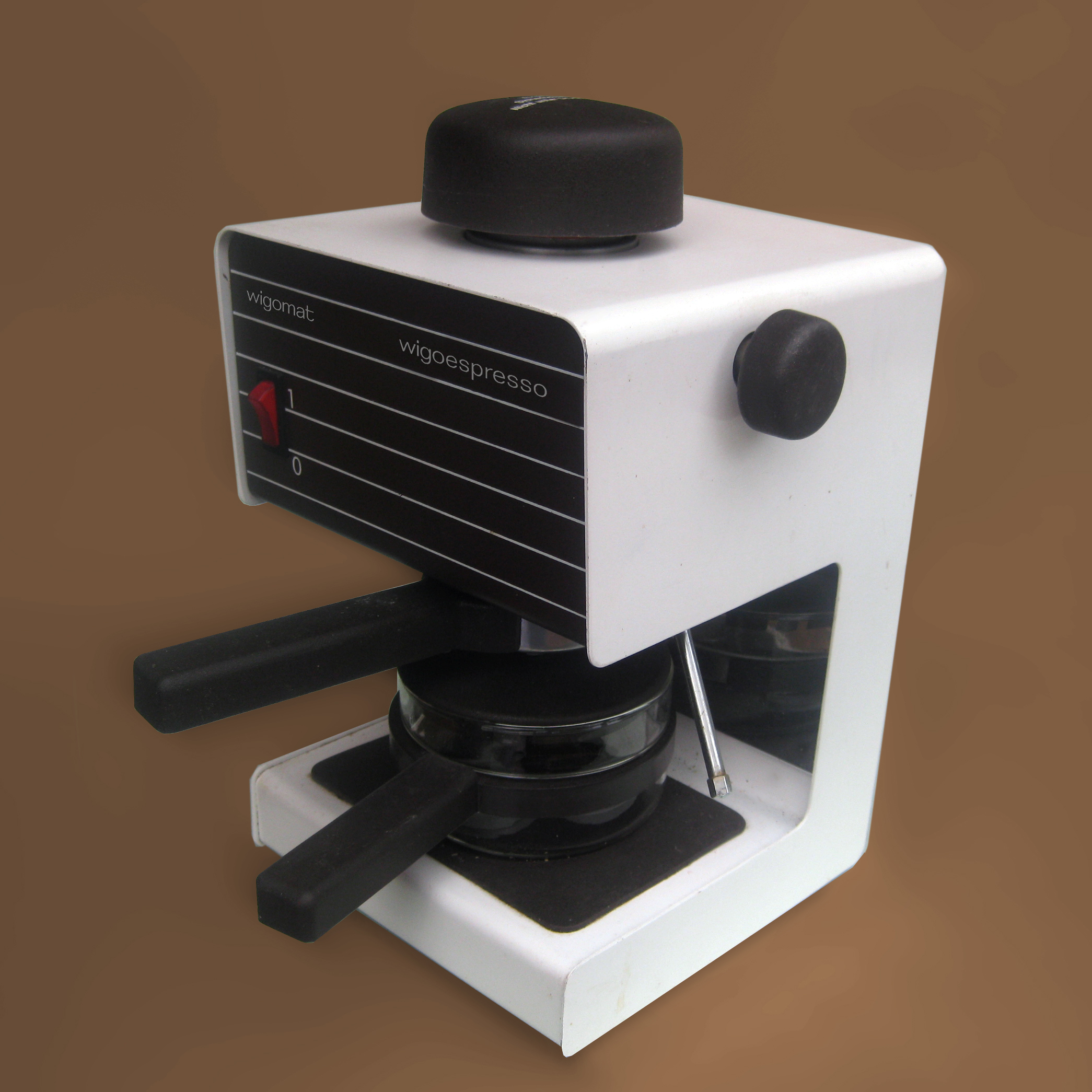
Home espresso machine without pump (only with steam pressure)

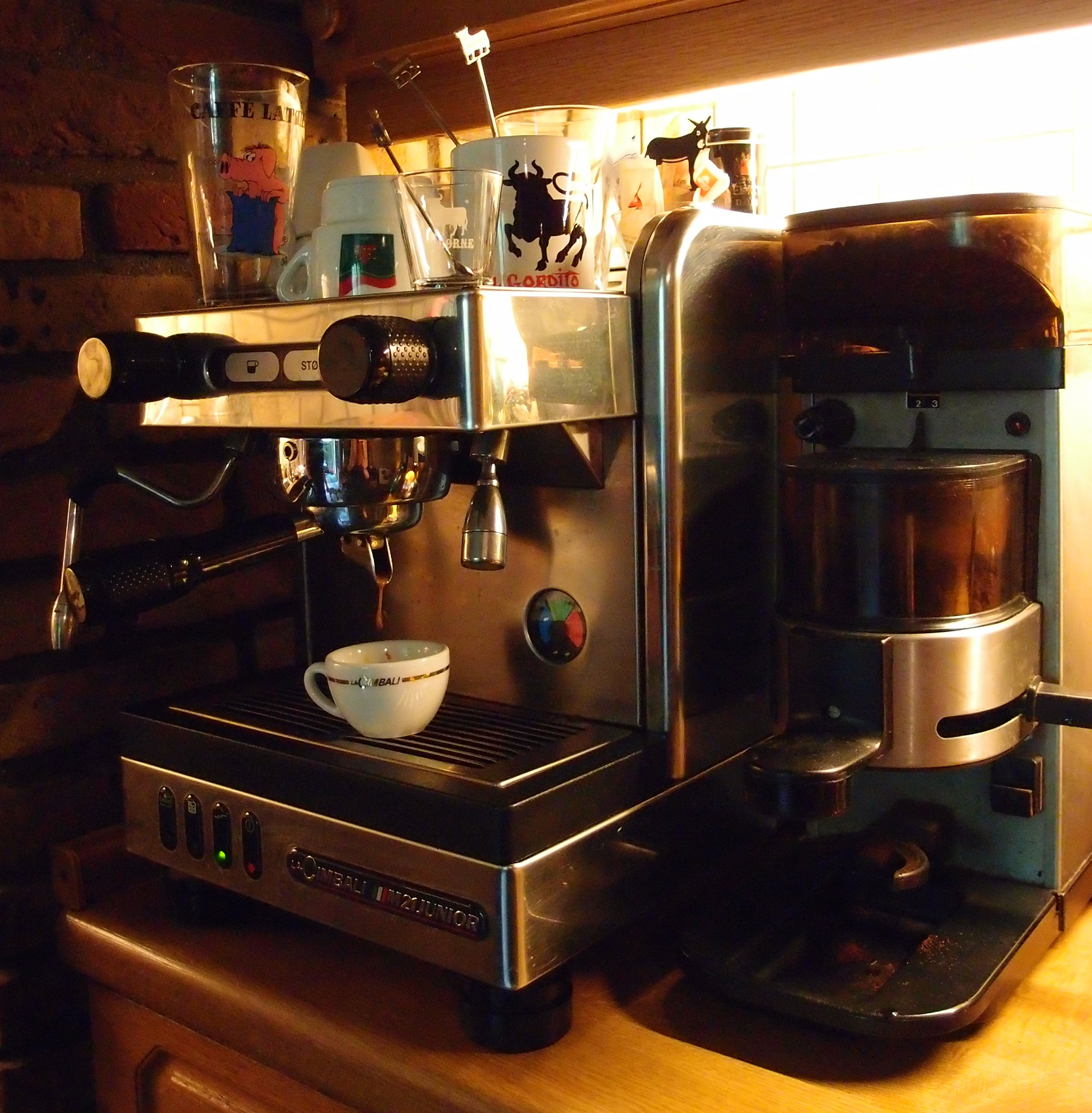
Home espresso machine with pump

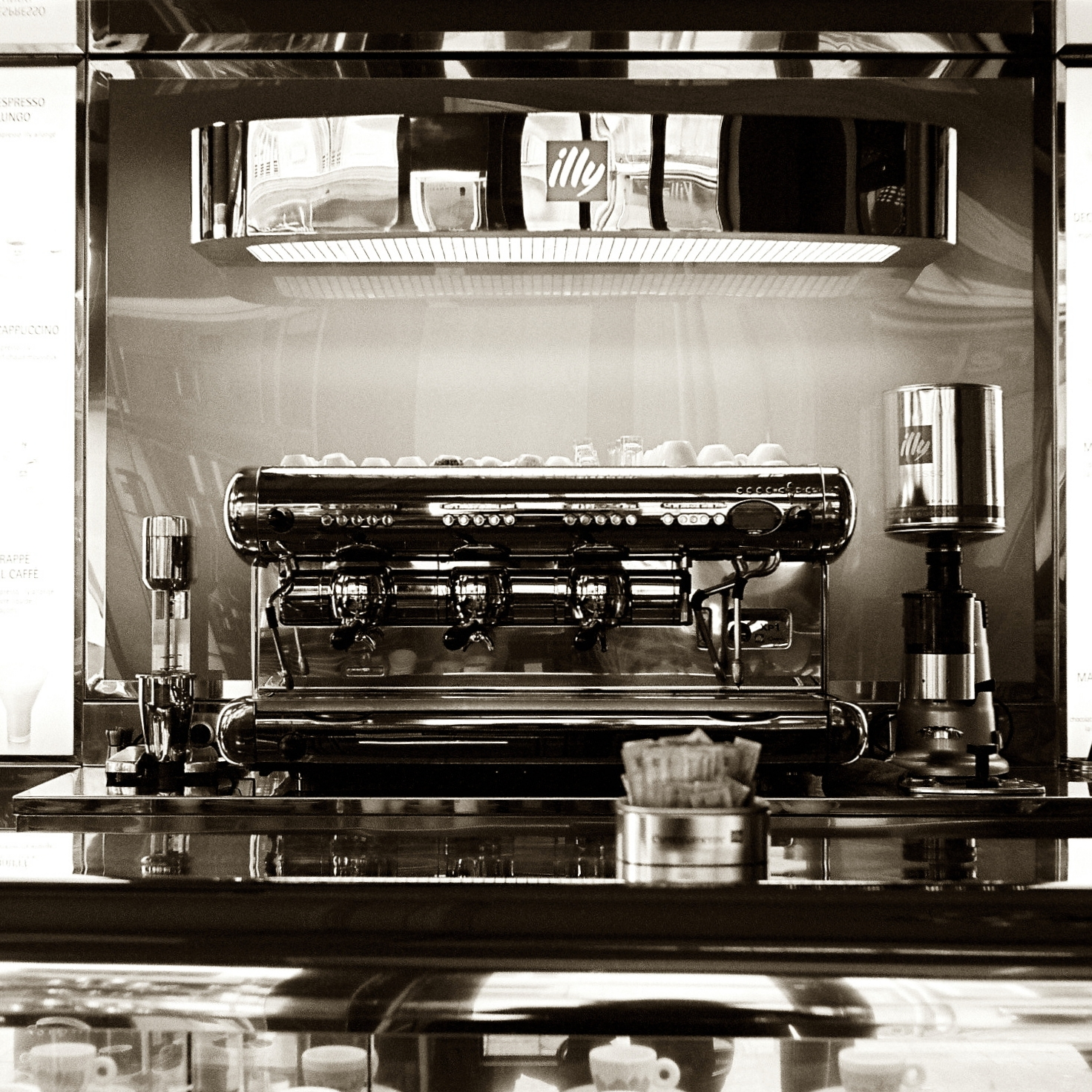
Commercial espresso machine

Gravity and steeping:

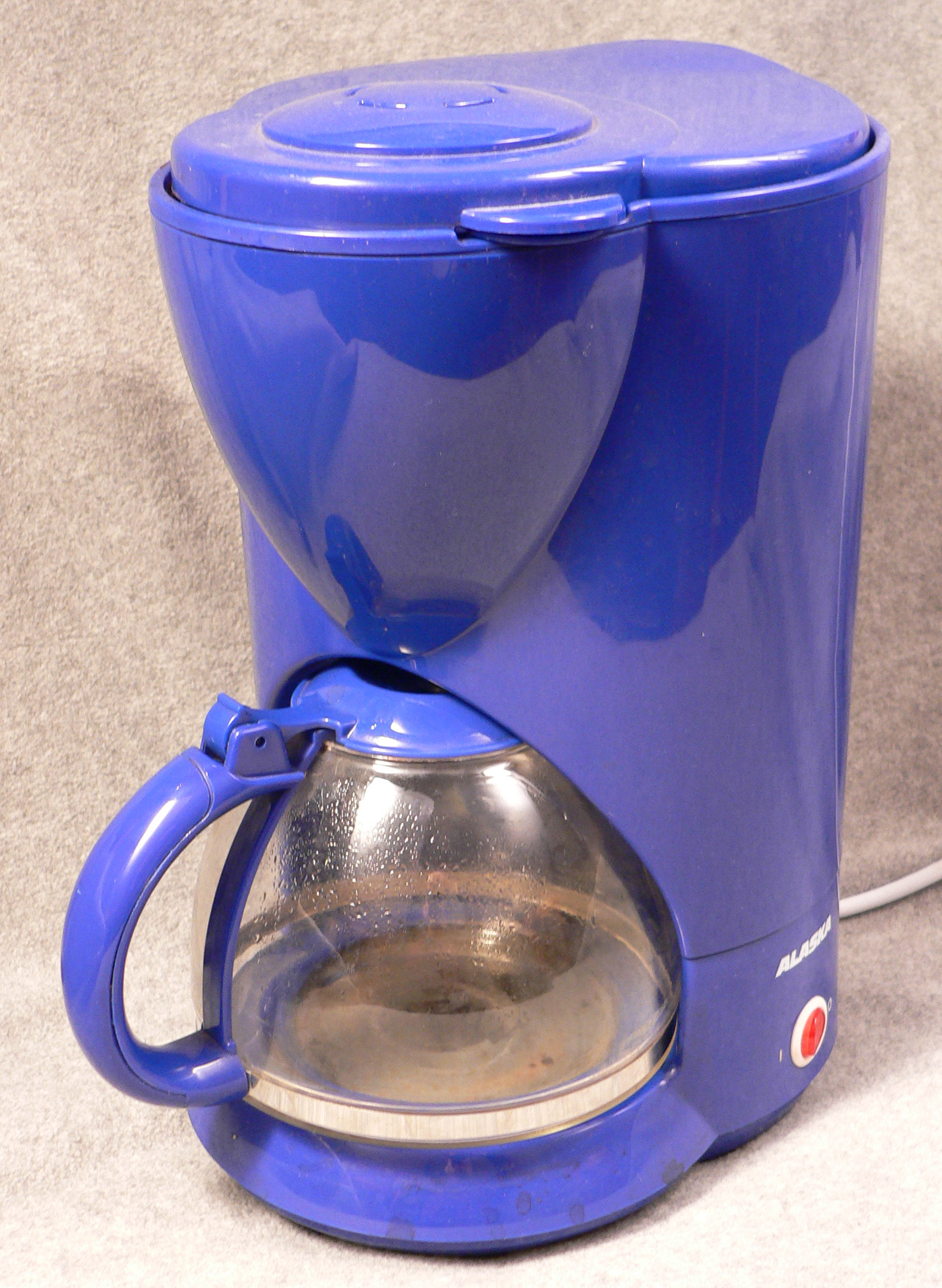
Electric drip brewer

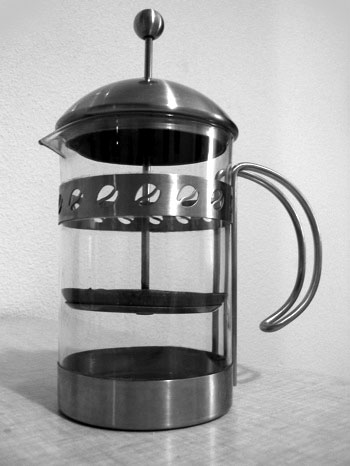
Cafetière/French press

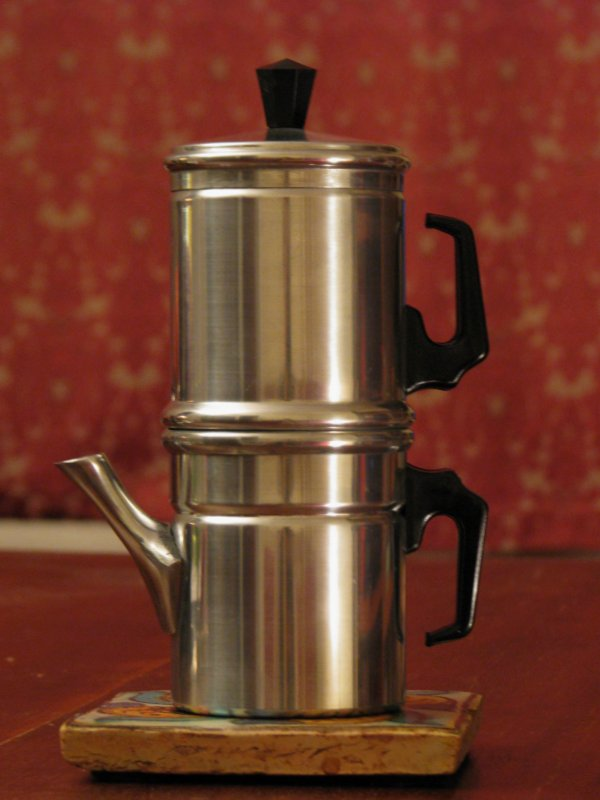
Neapolitan flip coffee pot

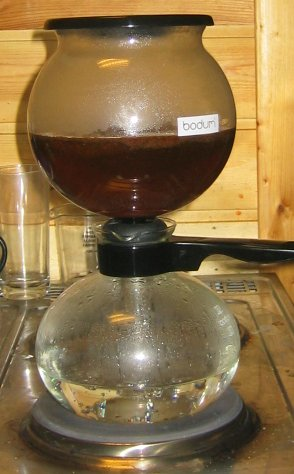
Vacuum brewer

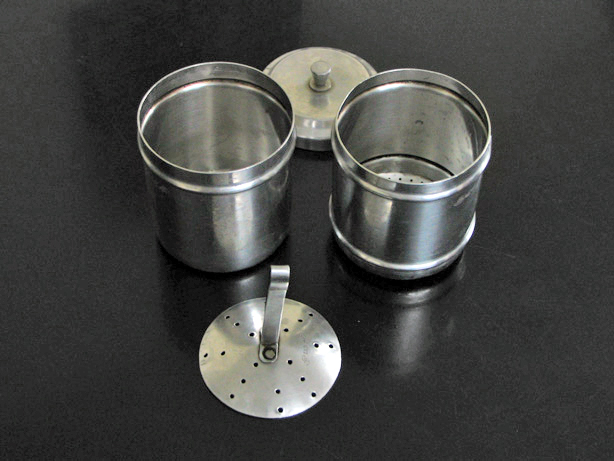
Indian coffee filter

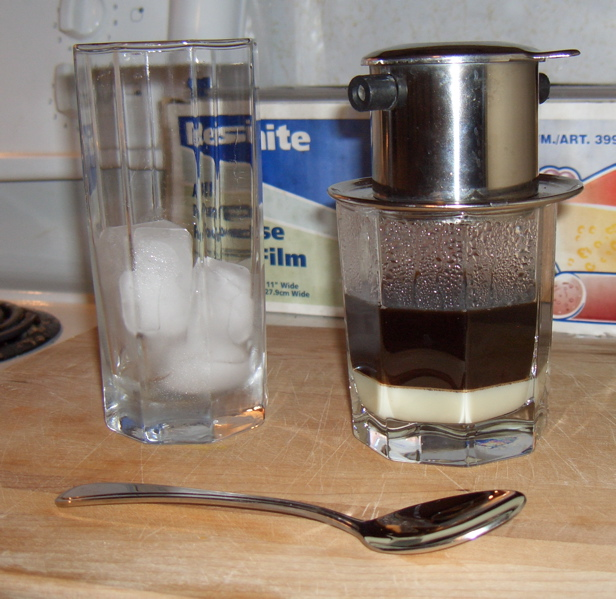
Preparation of Vietnamese iced coffee

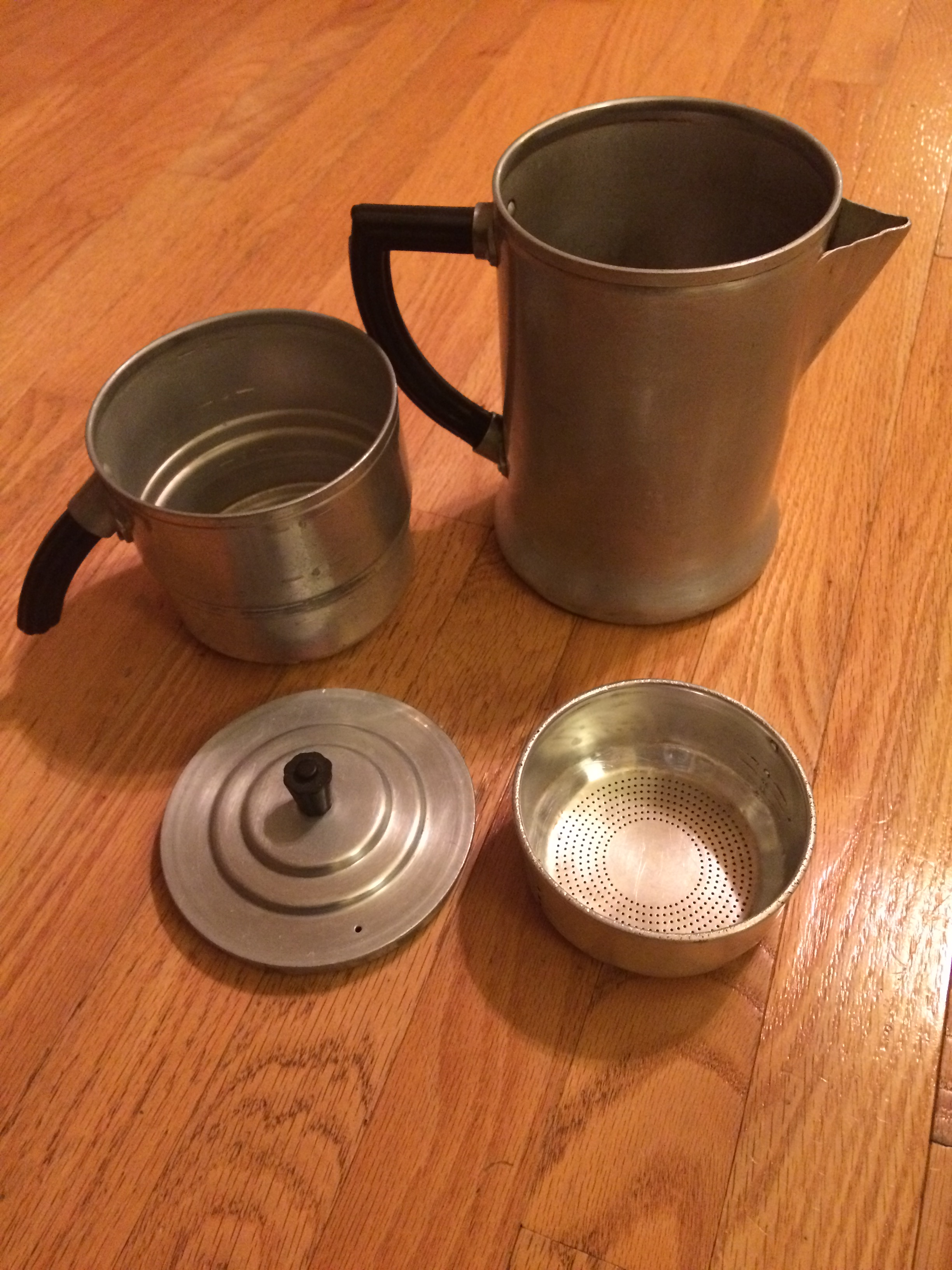
Disassembled Drip-O-lator coffee pot

== Instant coffee ==
Instant coffee is made commercially by drying prepared coffee. The resulting soluble powder is dissolved in hot water, and sugar, sweeteners, milk or creamers are added as desired.

== Presentation ==
Also see the article Coffee culture.

=== Hot drinks ===
==== Espresso-based, without milk ====
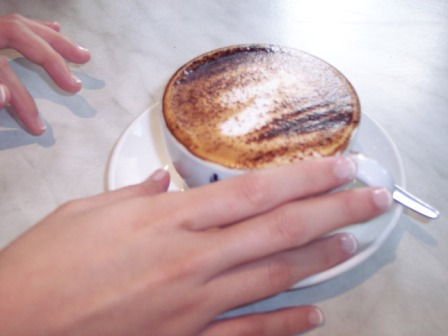
Cappuccino

- Espresso: see above under heading Pressure. Typical ratio of 1:2, ground coffee to water.
- Ristretto is an espresso drink where the weight of the ground coffee is equal to the weight of the brewed shots a 1:1 ratio. The result is a "shorter" shot that, when brewed using darker roasted coffee is sweeter but with lighter coffees can become highly acidic.
- Bica is a Portuguese espresso, longer than its Italian counterpart, but a little bit softer in taste. This is due to the fact that Portuguese roasting is slightly lighter than the Italian one. "Bica" is thus similar to "Lungo" in Italy.
- Lungo is different from an Americano. It is a "longer" espresso run through the machine, typically anything above 1:3; The extra water runs through the puck of coffee in the espresso machine, as opposed to adding water. Typically resulting in more bitter flavours although some light roasted coffees can benefit from longer extractions.
- Americano style coffee is made with espresso (one or several shots), with hot water then added to give a similar strength (but different flavour) to drip-brewed coffee.
- Long black is similar to Americano it can be prepared in different order (a double shot of espresso is added to water instead of vice versa) and is often served in a similar cup to a Flat white (6 oz); Most common in Australia and New Zealand but regularly found in speciality coffee shops.

==== Espresso-based, with milk ====
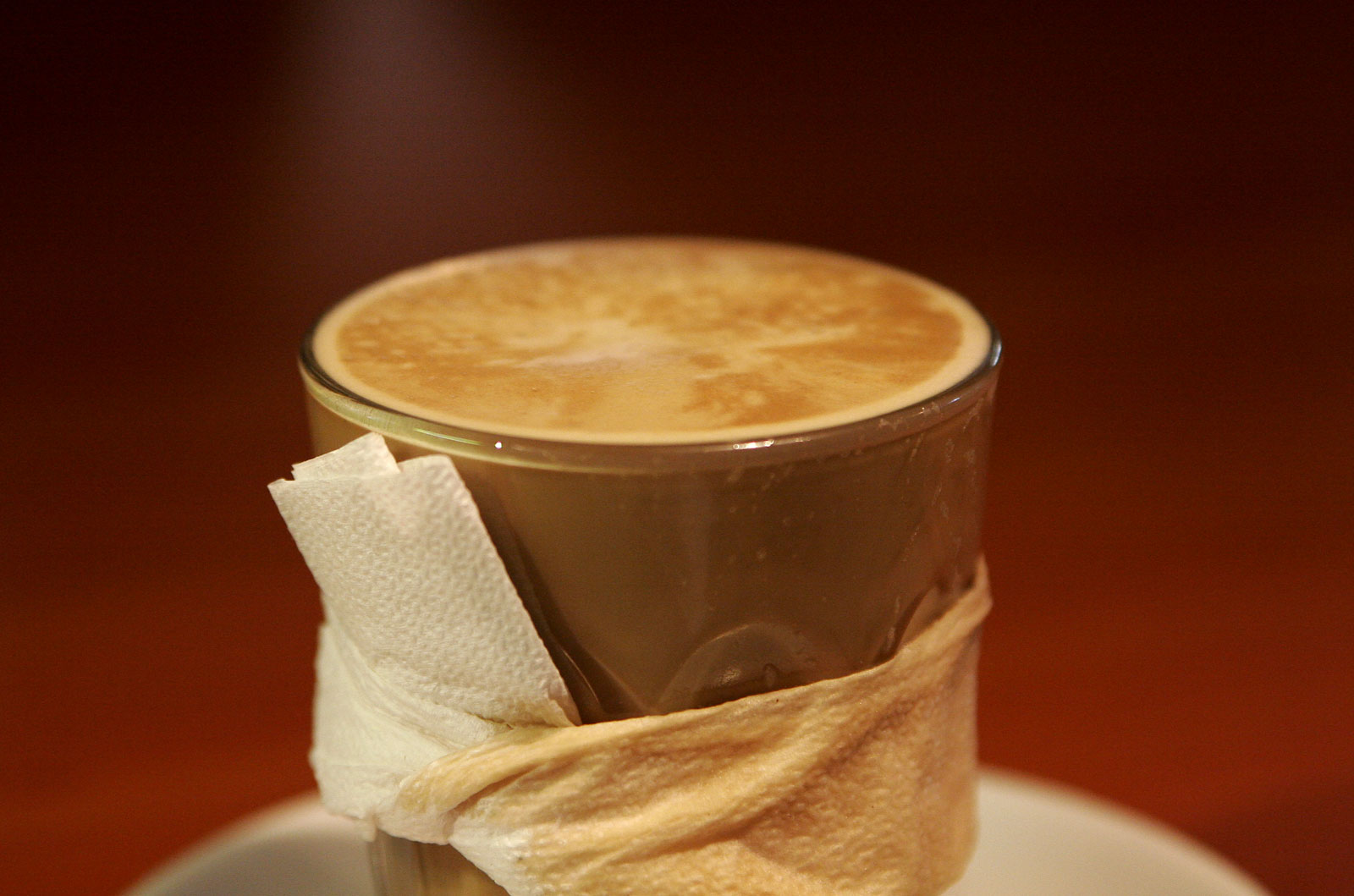
A café Latte

- Caffè breve is an American variation of a latte: a milk-based espresso drink using steamed half-and-half (light - 10 per cent - cream) instead of milk.
- Caffè latte or caffè e latte is often called simply latte, which is Italian for "milk", in English-speaking countries; it is espresso with steamed milk, traditionally topped with froth created from steaming the milk. A latte is made of one-third espresso and two-thirds steamed milk. More frothed milk makes it weaker than a cappuccino. A latte is also commonly served in a tall glass; if the espresso is slowly poured into the frothed milk from the rim of the glass, three layers of different shades will form, with the milk at the bottom, the froth on top and the espresso in between. A latte may be sweetened with sugar or flavoured syrup. Caramel and vanilla and other flavours are used.
- Caffè macchiato, sometimes Espresso macchiato or "short" macchiato — macchiato meaning "marked" — is an espresso with a little steamed milk added to the top, usually 30–60 ml (1.0–2.0 US fl oz), sometimes sweetened with sugar or flavoured syrup. A "long" macchiato is a double espresso with a little steamed milk. This differs from a latte macchiato which is milk "marked" with espresso. A macchiato may be 'traditional' or 'topped up' (extra milk added) depending on strength preferences.
- Cappuccino is equal parts of espresso coffee and milk and froth, sometimes sprinkled with cinnamon or powdered cocoa.
- Flat white is one part espresso with two parts steamed milk, usually served in a cappuccino cup with the foam decorated with a motif (e.g., fern or heart). This is a speciality of Australia and New Zealand.
- Galão is a Bica (Portuguese espresso) to which is added hot milk, tapped from a canister and sprayed into the glass in which it is served.
- Latte macchiato is the inverse of a caffè macchiato, being a tall glass of steamed milk spotted with a small amount of espresso, sometimes sweetened with sugar or syrup.
- Mocha is a latte with chocolate added.
- Café con leche is espresso with steamed milk ("leche" is Spanish for "milk"), usually half coffee and half milk, similar to latte but less frothy.
- Cortado is espresso with a small amount of very lightly foamed milk added, in contrast to a macchiato's more frothy texture. In Spain when served with condensed milk, this is called "cafe con leche condensada", or "Bombon".

==== Brewed or boiled, non espresso-based ====
Cream being poured into drip-brewed coffee

- Black coffee is drip-brewed, percolated, vacuum brewed, or French-press-style coffee served without cream or sugar.
- White coffee is black coffee with unheated milk or creamer added to it; this is the most popular way of drinking coffee in the United States. Some persons who drink coffee this way add sugar to it. (Note: though having a similar term, this is not to be confused with the Beirut herbal tea from Lebanon or the Malaysian Ipoh white coffee.)
- Café au lait is similar to latte except that drip-brewed or French press coffee is used instead of espresso, with an equal amount of milk (in France, this term refers to a milk coffee that is generally made using espresso coffee that is not dissimilar to a café con leche).
- Kopi tubruk is an Indonesian-style coffee similar in presentation to Turkish coffee. However, kopi tubruk is made from coarse coffee grounds, and is boiled together with a solid lump of sugar. It is popular on the islands of Java and Bali and their surroundings.
- Indian filter coffee, particularly common in southern India, is prepared with rough-ground dark roasted coffee beans (e.g., Arabica, PeaBerry), and chicory. The coffee is drip-brewed for a few hours in a traditional metal coffee filter before being served with milk and sugar. The ratio is usually 1/4 decoction, 3/4 milk.
- Greek coffee is prepared similarly to Turkish coffee. The main difference is that the coffee beans are ground into a finer powder and sugar is added during the process. It does not contain other flavours, and is usually served without milk. Greek coffee is served in a small cup with a handle, sometimes accompanied by a small cookie, and always with a glass of water. A similar method to the Greek preparation is used in Colombia to make "tinto," strong black coffee that is often brewed with panela, a sugarcane juice concentrate in cake form. A muslin or fine-cloth bag is used to strain the grounds.
- Indochinese-style coffee is another form of drip brew. In this form, hot water is allowed to drip though a metal mesh into a cup, and the resulting strong brew is poured into a glass containing sweetened condensed milk which may contain ice. Due to the high volume of coffee grounds required to make strong coffee in this fashion, the brewing process is quite slow. It is highly popular in Laos, Vietnam and Cambodia.

==== Fortified coffee ====
- Red Eye is one espresso shot added to a cup of coffee (typically 210–480 ml, 7–16 oz). Some add milk or sugar.
- Black Eye is two espresso shots added to a cup of coffee (typically 210–480 ml, 7–16 oz). Some add milk or sugar.

==== Flavoured coffees ====
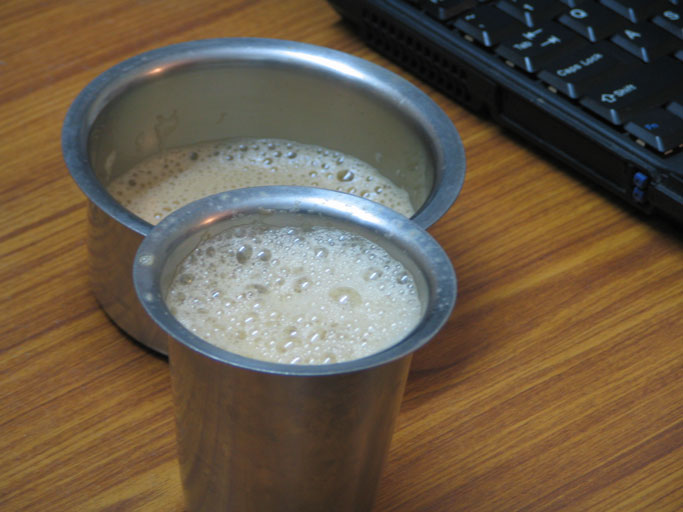
Madras filter coffee, still in its dabarah and tumbler

- Flavoured coffee: In some cultures, flavoured coffees are common. Chocolate is a common additive that is either sprinkled on top or mixed with the coffee to imitate the taste of Mocha. Other flavourings include spices such as salt, cinnamon, nutmeg, cardamom, or Italian syrups. In the Maghreb, the orange blossom is used as a flavouring. Vanilla- and hazelnut-flavoured coffees are common in the United States; these are usually artificially flavoured.

- Turkish coffee is served in very small cups about the size of those used for espresso. Traditional Turkish coffee cups have no handles, but modern ones often do. The crema or "face" is considered crucial, and since it requires some skill to achieve its presence is taken as evidence of a well-made brew. (See above for preparation method.) It is usually made sweet, with sugar added after the brew process begins, and often is flavoured with cardamom or other spices. In many places it is customary to serve it with a tall glass of water on the side.
- Chicory is sometimes combined with coffee as a flavouring agent, as in the style of coffee served at the famous Café du Monde in New Orleans. Chicory has historically been used as a coffee substitute when real coffee was scarce, as in wartime. Chicory is popular as an additive in Belgium and is an ingredient in Madras filter coffee.

==== Alcoholic coffee drinks ====
Alcoholic spirits and liqueurs can be added to coffee, often sweetened and with cream floated on top. These beverages are often given names according to the alcoholic addition:

- Black coffee with brandy, or marc, or grappa, or other strong spirit.
- Irish coffee, with Irish whiskey, sugar, and cream. There are many variants, essentially the same but with the use of a different spirit:
  - Café au Drambuie, with Drambuie instead of whiskey
  - Caribbean or Jamaican coffee, with dark rum; a similar drink exists in northern Germany, called Pharisäer
  - Gaelic or Scotch coffee, with Scotch whisky
  - Kahlúa coffee, with Kahlúa coffee liqueur
- Café royal, with a flambéd and slightly caramelised teaspoonful of sugar and cognac
- Kaffekask, a Swedish variant where some coffee is added to a cup of brännvin

=== Cold drinks ===
- Iced coffee is a cold version of hot coffee, typically drip or espresso diluted with ice water. Iced coffee can also be an iced or chilled form of any drink in this list. In Australia, iced coffee is cold milk flavoured with a small amount of coffee, often topped with ice cream or whipped cream, and served in a tall glass.
- Frappé is a strong cold coffee drink made from instant coffee and in Greece it is consumed more than Turkish coffee (which the Greeks refer to as "elliniko" or "greek" after the Greek-Turkish dispute over Cyprus in 1974). Frappé was created in Greece in 1957 in the city of Thessaloniki when a businessman taking part in the open, international trade exhibition there, couldn't wait for hot water for his coffee. His idea spread instantly to all Greece. Preparation: one spoonful of instant coffee (and sugar if one wishes) in a shaker with some water (and milk). It is shaken hard enough for one minute, then icecubes are added and it is served with a drinking straw because of the "foam" that is produced.
- Ice-blended coffee (trade names: Frappuccino, Ice Storm) is a variation of iced coffee. The name Frappucino (a portmanteau of frappé and cappuccino) was originally developed, named, trademarked and sold by George Howell's Eastern Massachusetts coffee shop chain, The Coffee Connection, which was purchased by Starbucks in 1994. Other coffeehouses serve similar concoctions, but under different names, since "Frappuccino" is a Starbucks trademark. One commonly used by many stores is Ice Storm. Another prominent example is the Javakula at Seattle's Best Coffee. The iced cappuccino ("ice cap"), sold at coffee chain Tim Horton's, is a popular ice-blended drink in Canada. A frappuccino is a latte, mocha, or macchiato mixed with crushed ice and flavourings (such as vanilla or hazelnut if requested by the customer) and blended.
- Thai iced coffee is a popular drink commonly offered at Thai restaurants in the United States. It consists of coffee, ice, and sweetened condensed milk.
- Igloo Espresso a regular espresso shot poured over a small amount of crushed ice, served in an espresso cup. Sometimes it is requested to be sweetened as the pouring over the ice causes the shot to become bitter. Originating in Italy and has migrated to Australian coffee shops.
- Cold brew coffee is a process of brewing coffee slowly (12 hours) with cold water to produce a strong coffee concentrate, often served diluted with water or milk of choice. A common commercial example is Toddy coffee, which is a drip system.
- Affogato is a cold drink, often served as dessert, consisting of a scoop of ice cream or gelato topped with an espresso shot. Often, the drinker is served the ice cream and espresso in separate cups, and will mix them at the table so as to prevent the ice cream from entirely melting before it can be consumed.

=== Confectionery (non-drinks) ===
- Chocolate-covered roasted coffee beans are available as a confection; eating them delivers more caffeine to the body than does drinking the same mass (or volume) of brewed coffee (ratios depend upon the brewing method) and has similar physiological effects, unless the beans have been decaffeinated.

== See also ==
- Home roasting coffee
