= Blade grinder =

Machine with spinning blade, such as a food processor

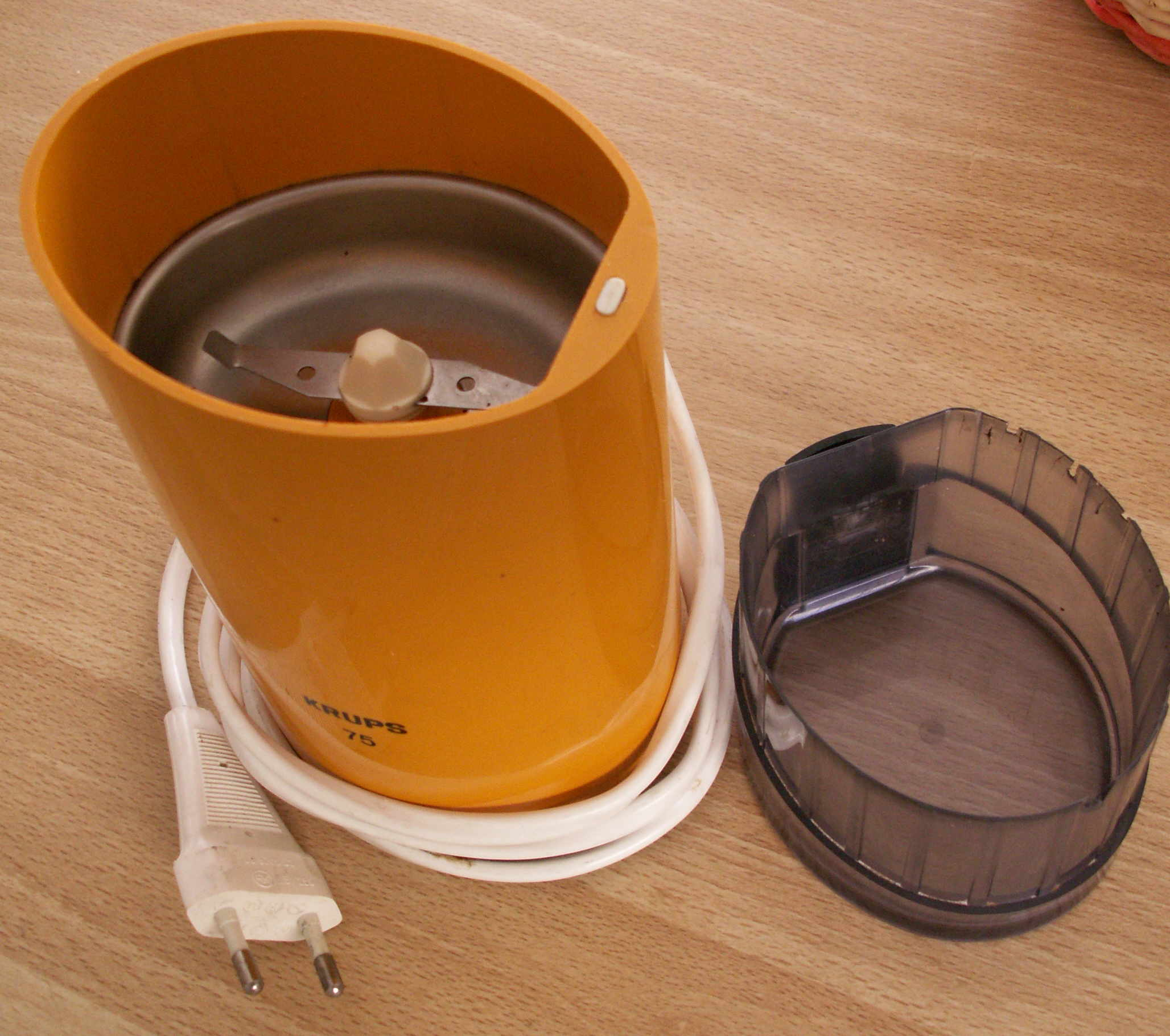
Blade grinder for home grinding of coffee beans and similar things

A blade grinder, also known as propeller grinder, is a machine that chops material while mixing it, by means of a high-speed spinning blade. Applications of blade grinders for preparing foods include numerous electric kitchen appliances, such as blenders (including immersion blenders), food processors, some garbage disposals, and some coffee grinders. The terms "blade grinder" and "propeller grinder" are in popular use to distinguish the blade grinder type of coffee grinder from other types.

== Design ==
A blade grinder may be considered a type of hammermill. A blade grinder resembles a meat grinder in that both have propeller-shaped cutting blades. However, meat grinders (and food mills) use a scissor cutting action as the blades rotate against a perforated metal plate. Meat grinder blades rotate at a much slower speed than blade grinders, which may rotate at speeds as high as 20,000 to 30,000 rpm; for example, the Steele model mixer-grinder by Indian appliance manufacturer Preethi has a no-load speed of 23,500 rpm and loaded speed of 11,500rpm.

Blade grinders also resemble industrial blade (propeller) mixers, which like meat grinders rotate at much slower speeds. Unlike blade grinders, these mixers do not alter (break, cut, shred, macerate, pulverize) the material being mixed. The high speed of rotation of blade grinders is necessary to achieve their cutting action. In a blender application, the high speed of rotation contributes to shearing, which in turn contributes to aeration and the formation of emulsions. These are desirable qualities in many food preparations. A blade grinder can run on batteries or more commonly on utility electricity.

== History ==
Blade grinders are a 20th-century innovation that followed the adaptation of propellers to small motorboats. Blade grinders exploit a feature of propellers that is undesirable in the propulsion systems of boats and airplanes: the higher the rotation speed, the more energy is spent in shearing and cutting rather than in pushing.

Commercial blenders were developed in the 1920s. With increasing miniaturization of the electric motor, the first consumer blender, the Waring Blendor, was developed in the 1930s, and a canister blender, the Osterizer, entered the market in 1946. The first immersion blenders were patented in the 1950s.

== Types ==
=== Coffee grinders ===
Special purpose coffee grinders usually are either blade grinders or burr grinders: blade grinders being less expensive and having additional uses, burr grinders giving a better quality of grind. Special purpose spice grinders usually are either blade grinders or mortar and pestle (or related tools).

Low cost coffee blade grinders for use in home kitchens frequently are difficult to clean. The Joy of Cooking (1997 edition) suggests a blade grinder may be cleaned by grinding a few tablespoons of sugar then wiping it out. Another suggestion is to clean around the blade with a soft brush or a damp cloth. Because these blade grinders frequently are used for grinding both coffee beans and spices, cleaning them well is important to prevent unwanted transfer of flavors. Some people keep two blade grinders, one for coffee and the other for spices.

=== Pharmacy, restaurant, and laboratory grinders ===
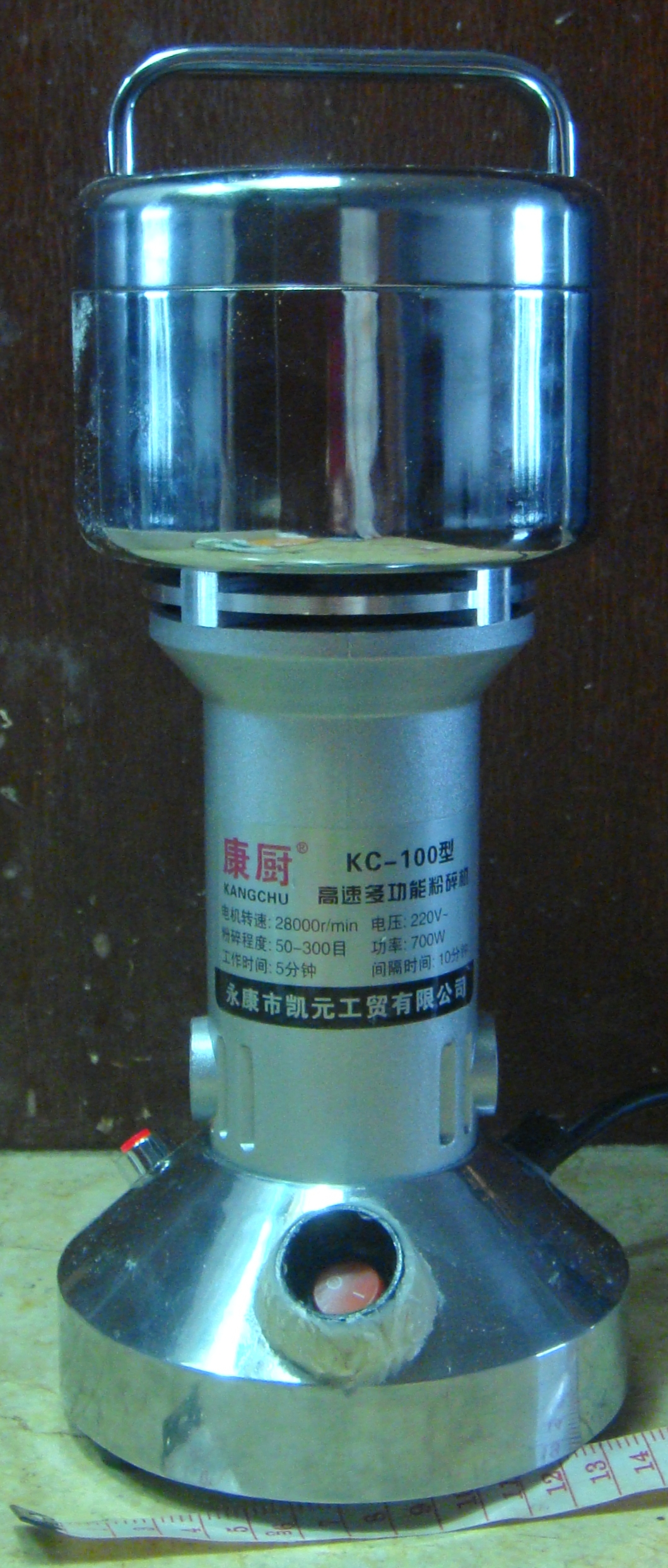
Side view

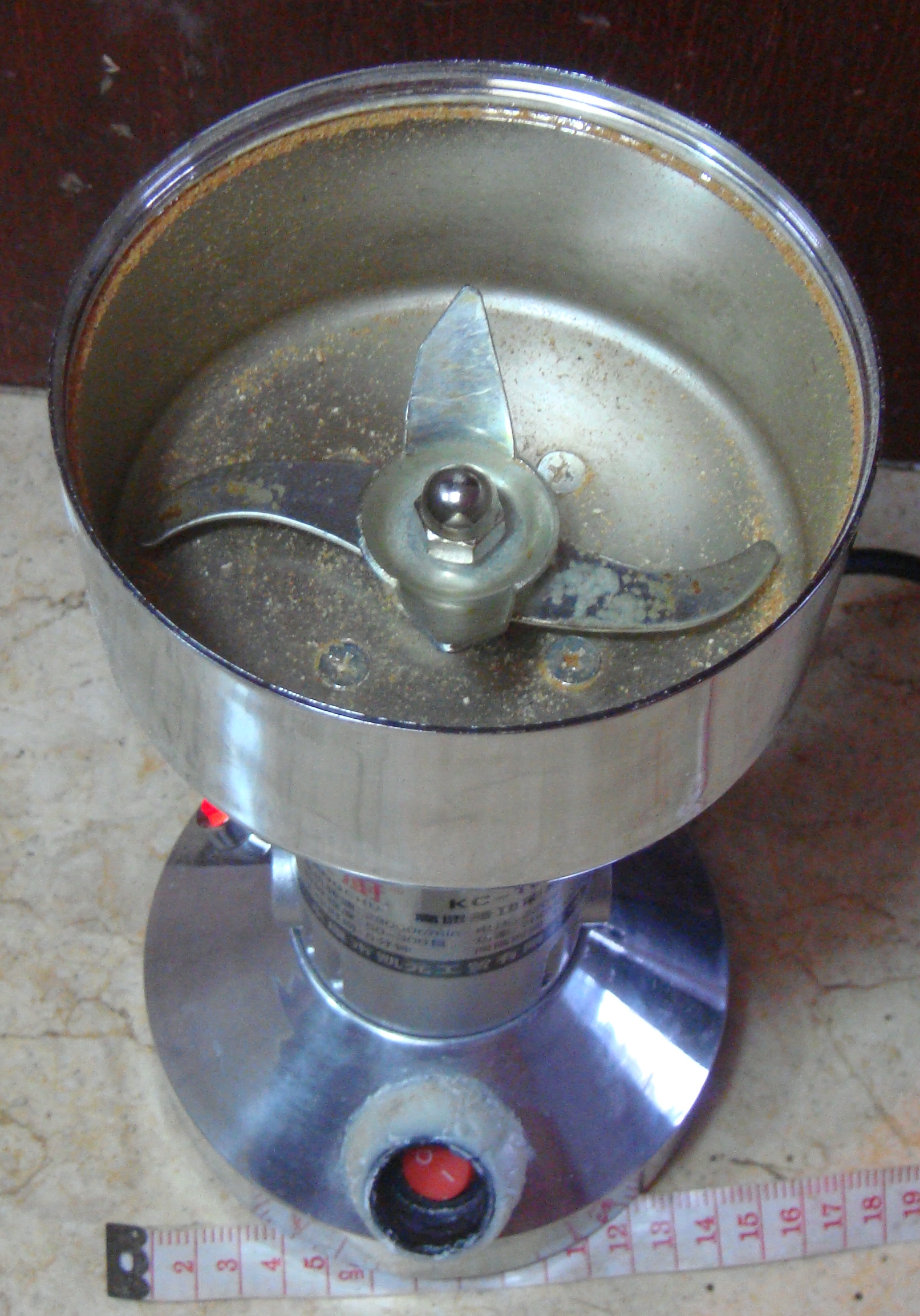
View showing grinding chamber

This model is smaller than most found in Chinese pharmacies, although the design is the same.

Blade grinders for home grinding of coffee beans are commonly used for grinding spices. However, larger, more powerful versions are used, particularly in Asia. Commonly found in pharmacies in China for grinding Chinese traditional medicine, the blades of this style of grinder can rotate at 28,000 rpm or more and are capable of reducing hard dried roots to powder. This type of grinder is also used in restaurants for spices as well as for laboratory use.

=== Blenders ===
Blenders are blade grinders designed specifically for use with wet ingredients. Blenders are popular tools for production of purées and pastes, using both the cutting and shearing effects of high speed blades.

=== Food processor ===
A food processor is similar to a blender. The primary difference is that food processors use interchangeable blades and disks (attachments) rather than a fixed blade. Also, their bowls are wider and shorter, a more proper shape for the solid or semi-solid foods usually worked in a food processor.

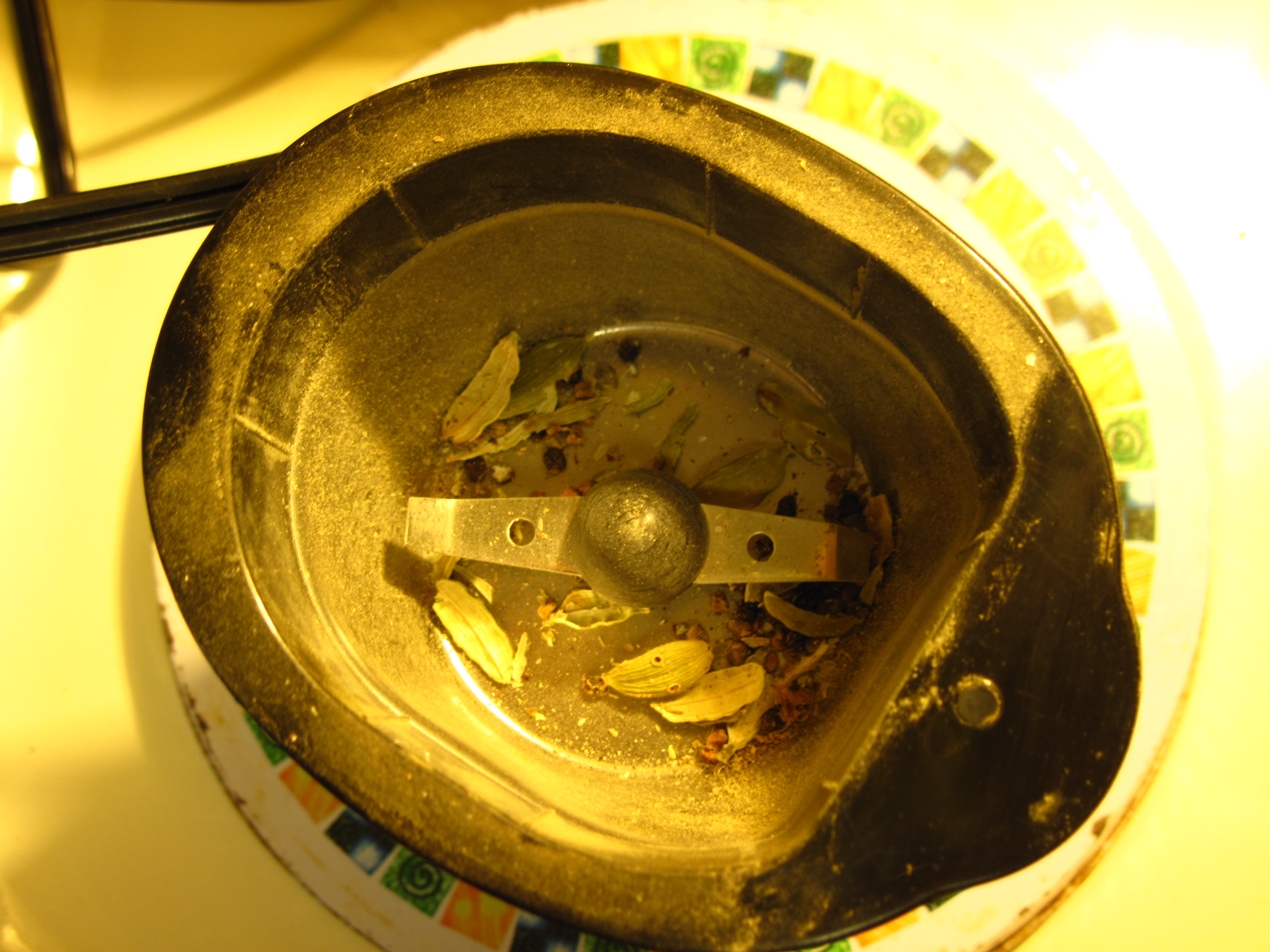
Blade grinder used to separate cardamom seeds from pods

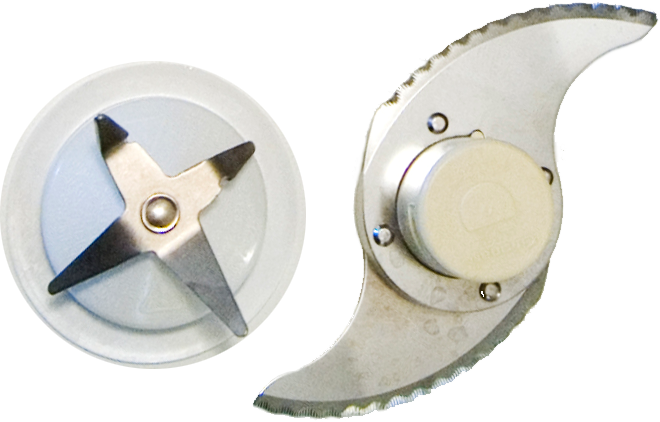
Blades from a blender (left) and food processor (right)

== See also ==
- Blade
- Cavitation
- Impeller
- Grinding machine
- Milling machine
- Mixer (cooking)
