= List of museums in the Czech Republic =

This is a list of museums in the Czech Republic, sorted by regions.

== Central Bohemian ==
- Český Šternberk Castle (castle museum)
- Italian Court (castle museum)
- Kačina (castle museum)
- Karlštejn (castle museum)
- Konopiště (castle museum)
- Křivoklát Castle (castle museum)
- Military museum Lešany (museum of military vehicles)
- Mining Museum Příbram (museum of mining)
- Škoda Auto Museum (auto museum)
- Stranov (castle museum)

== Hradec Králové ==
- East Bohemian Museum
- Hrádek u Nechanic
- Kost Castle
- Museum of Textile in Česká Skalice
- Ratibořice

== Karlovy Vary ==
- Kynžvart Castle
- Loket Castle

== Liberec ==
- Bezděz Castle
- Grabštejn
- Sychrov Castle
- Valdštejn Castle
- Museum of armoured vehicles Smržovka

== Moravian–Silesian ==
- Museum of the fortifications Hlučín
- Muzeum Těšínska
- Silesian Ostrava Castle

== Olomouc ==
- Bouzov Castle
- Convent of Dominican Sisters in Olomouc
- Jánský vrch

== Pardubice ==
- Chrudim Regional Museum
- Esperanto Museum in Svitavy
- Kunětická hora Castle
- Vysoké Mýto Regional Museum

== Plzeň ==
- Mariánská Týnice
- Nebílovy Castle

== South Bohemian ==
- Červená Lhota Castle
- Český Krumlov Castle
- Egon Schiele Art Centrum
- Hluboká Castle
- Kratochvíle
- Orlík Castle
- Rožmberk Castle

== South Moravian ==
- Bítov Castle
- Dolní Kounice Synagogue
- Mendel Museum of Masaryk University
- Mikulov Castle
- Moravian Gallery in Brno
- Moravské zemské muzeum
- Museum of Romani Culture
- Pernštejn Castle
- Slavkov Castle
- Špilberk Castle
- Villa Tugendhat
- Veveří Castle
- Vranov nad Dyjí Chateau
- Windmill Ruprechtov

== Ústí nad Labem ==
- The Chateau at Klášterec nad Ohří
- Franciscan Monastery in Kadaň
- Krásný Dvůr Castle

== Vysočina ==
- Chateau at Kamenice nad Lipou

== Zlín ==
- Buchlov
- Buchlovice Castle
- Moravská gobelínová manufaktura

== See also ==
- List of museums
- Tourism in the Czech Republic
- Culture of the Czech Republic
