= Lestkov =

Lestkov may refer to places in the Czech Republic:

- Lestkov (Tachov District), a municipality and village in the Plzeň Region
- Lestkov, a village and part of Radostná pod Kozákovem in the Liberec Region
- Lestkov, a village and part of Klášterec nad Ohří in the Ústí nad Labem Region
  - Egerberk, also called Lestkov, a castle in Klášterec nad Ohří
