= Klášterec =

Klášterec (means "little monastery") may refer to:

- Klášterec nad Ohří
  - The Chateau at Klášterec nad Ohří
- Klášterec nad Orlicí
