= Josef Sudek Gallery =

- Galerie Josefa Sudka
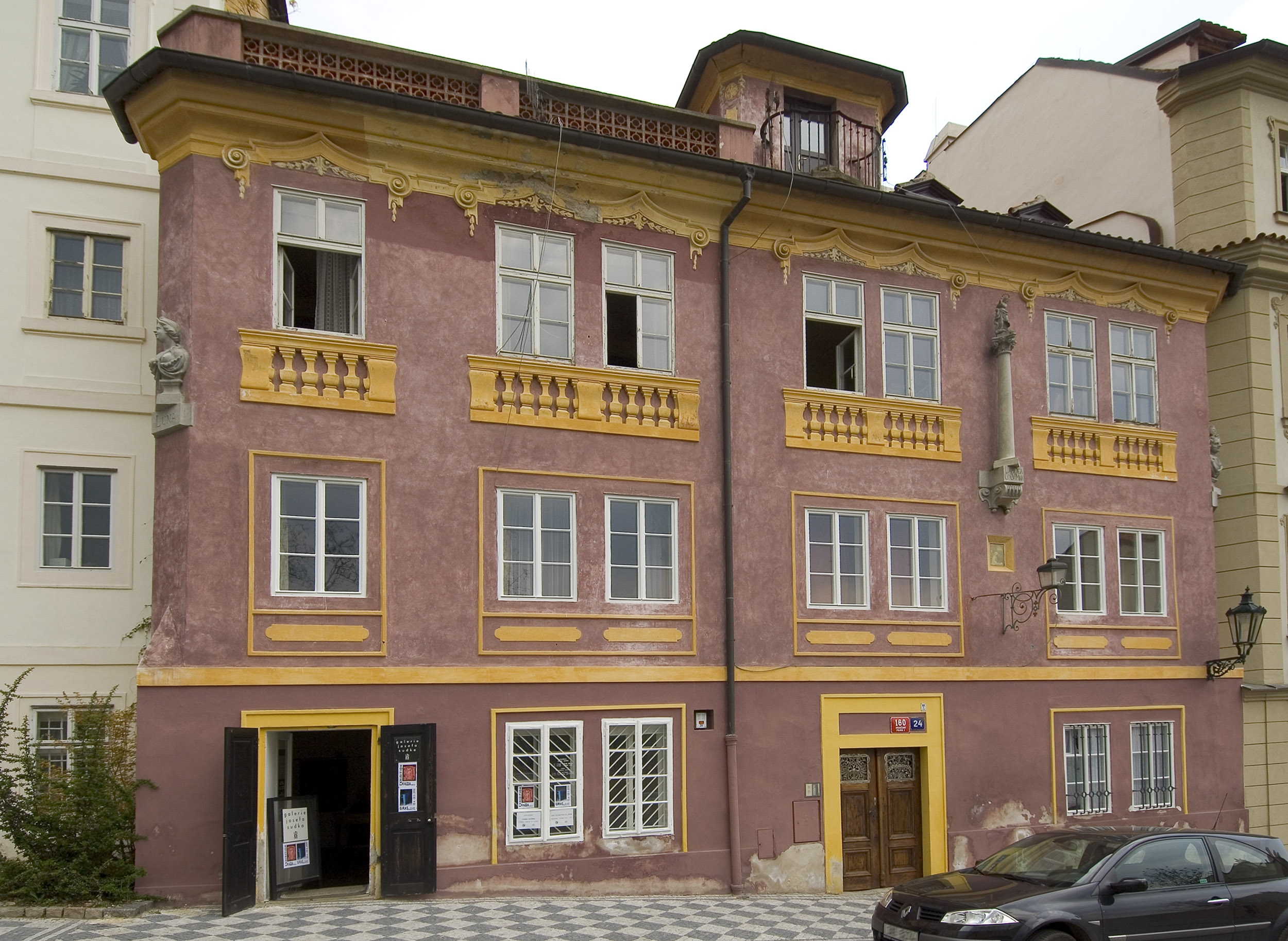
- Main Building of Josef Sudek Gallery in Prague
- Interactive fullscreen map
- Established: 1995; 30 years ago
- Location: Úvoz 160, Prague 1, Czech Republic, 118 00
- Coordinates: 50°5′18.4″N 14°23′40.09″E
- Website: https://www.upm.cz/galerie-josefa-sudka/

The Josef Sudek Gallery (Czech: Galerie Josefa Sudka) is near Hradčany (Úvoz 24) in Prague, in a house where Josef Sudek (b. 1896 Kolín, d. 1976 Prague) lived from 1959 until his death. Part of his photographic output was transferred to the MDA in Prague in the years 1978–1988. Since 1989 the MDA in Prague has also administered his flat, where the gallery opened in 1995. Sudek had also a studio in Prague, Na Újezdu 28, which he continued to use for his photographic work (namely the darkroom) after moving to Hradčany, and where his sister and assistant Božena Sudková lived.

Sudek's flat was a popular place for friendly gatherings of many artists, among them the poet Jaroslav Seifert, painter Jan Zrzavý, architect Otto Rothmayer and many others. In the flat, which was gradually filled with numerous paintings, frames, goblets, boxes and photographic tools, originated many now renowned compositions in the series Aviatic Remembrances, Easter Remembrances, Labyrinths and Glass Labyrinths. This flat was also a departure point from which Sudek used to set off to roam the Prague gardens, parks and his beloved outskirts.

== Exhibition programme ==
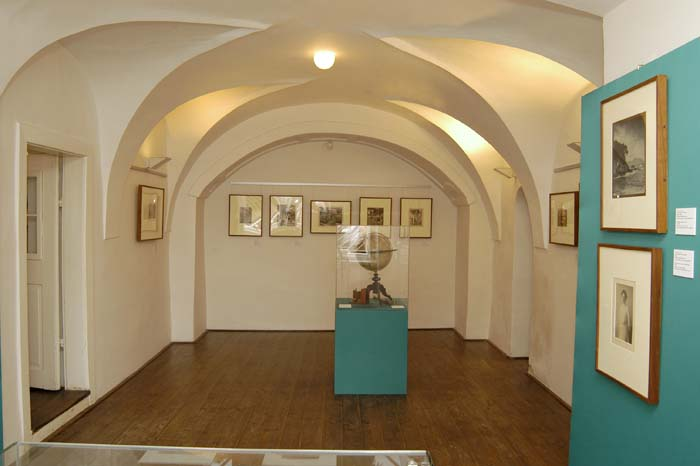
Interior of Josef Sudek Gallery in Prague

- Josef Sudek's work (photographic cycles, thematic series, comparative exhibitions).
- Personalities of modern Czech photography, special focus on inter-war years.
- History of photographic Pragensia from 19th century to the present day.

== See also ==
- List of museums devoted to one photographer
- Museum of Decorative Arts in Prague
- The Chateau at Klášterec nad Ohří
- Museum of Textile in Česká Skalice
- The Chateau at Kamenice nad Lipou

== Sources ==
As of July 12, 2009, this article is derived in whole or in part from Museum of Decorative Arts in Prague. The copyright holder has licensed the content in a manner that permits reuse under CC BY-SA 3.0 and GFDL. All relevant terms must be followed. The original text was at "Galerie Josefa Sudka"
