= Kamenice nad Lipou =

- Town
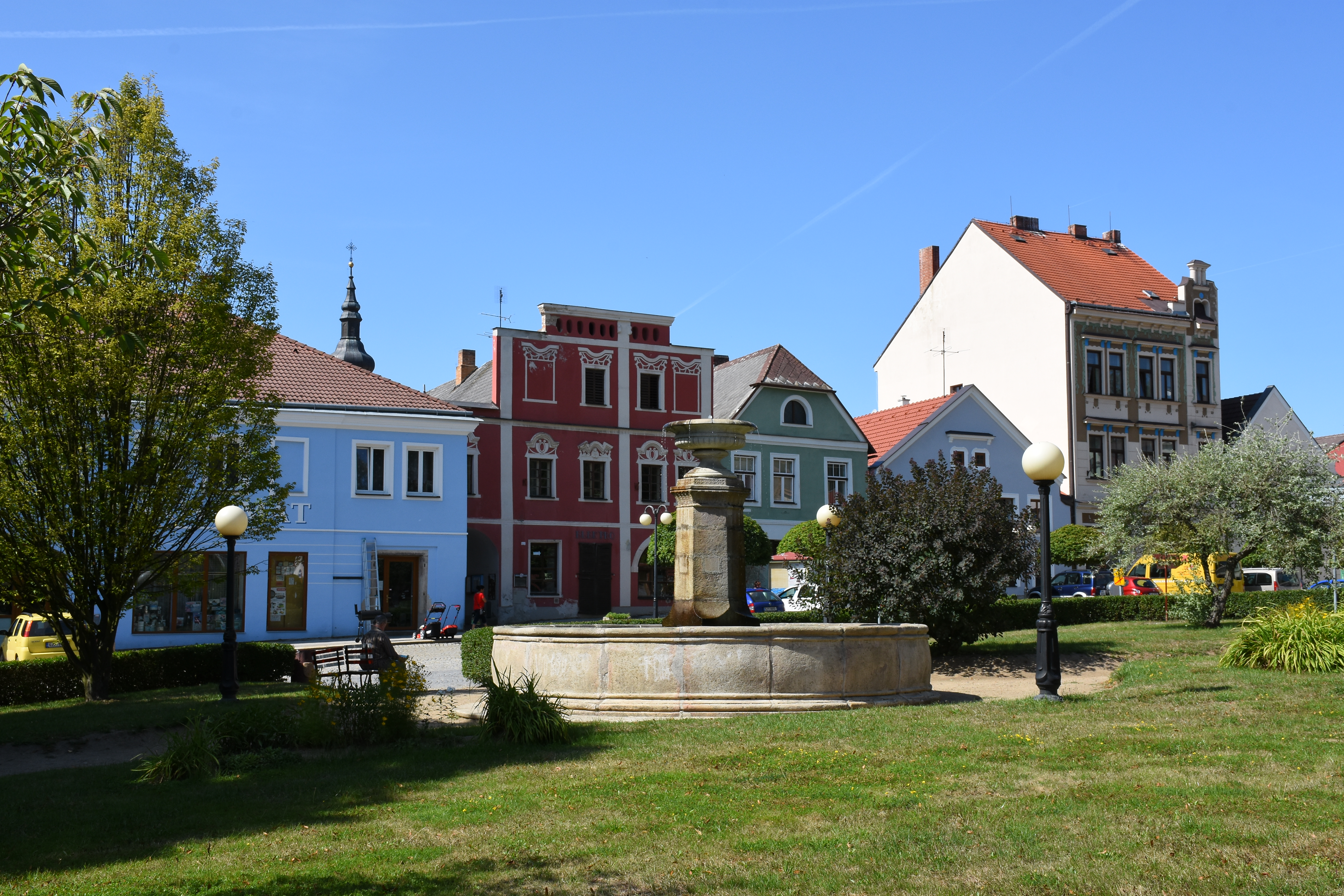
- Tenement houses at the town square

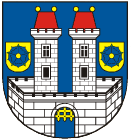
- Flag Coat of arms

- Location in the Czech Republic
- Coordinates: 49°18′11″N 15°4′31″E
- Country: Czech Republic
- Region: Vysočina
- District: Pelhřimov
- First mentioned: 1267

Government
  - Mayor: Tomáš Tesař

Area
  - Total: 31.54 km^{2} (12.18 sq mi)
- Elevation: 563 m (1,847 ft)

Population (2026-01-01)
  - Total: 3,687
  - Density: 116.9/km^{2} (302.8/sq mi)
- Time zone: UTC+1 (CET)
  - Summer (DST): UTC+2 (CEST)
- Postal code: 394 70
- Website: www.kamenicenl.cz

Kamenice nad Lipou (Czech pronunciation: [ˈkamɛɲɪtsɛ ˈnad lɪpou]; German: Kamnitz an der Linde) is a town in Pelhřimov District in the Vysočina Region of the Czech Republic. It has about 3,700 inhabitants. It is located on the Kamenice River in the Křemešník Highlands.

Kamenice nad Lipou was founded in the 13th century. The historic town centre is well preserved and is protected as an urban monument zone. The main landmark of the town is the Kamenice nad Lipou Castle.

== Administrative division ==
Kamenice nad Lipou consists of eight municipal parts (in brackets population according to the 2021 census):

- Kamenice nad Lipou (3,177)
- Antonka (68)
- Březí (14)
- Gabrielka (67)
- Johanka (51)
- Nová Ves (18)
- Pravíkov (57)
- Vodná (151)

== Etymology ==
The name Kamenice was transferred to the settlement from the Kamenice River. Kamenice is a common Czech name of watercourses, derived from the word kamenný (i.e. 'stony') and referring to the character of the river bed. To distinguish from other settlements with the same name, the settlement added nad Lipou (meaning 'upon a linden tree') into its name in honour of a linden tree planted in the castle garden in 1248.

== Geography ==
Kamenice nad Lipou is located about 18 kilometres (11 mi) southwest of Pelhřimov and 38 km (24 mi) west of Jihlava. It lies in the Křemešník Highlands. The highest point is at 682 m (2,238 ft) above sea level. The Kamenice River flows through the town. The area is rich in small fishponds.

== History ==
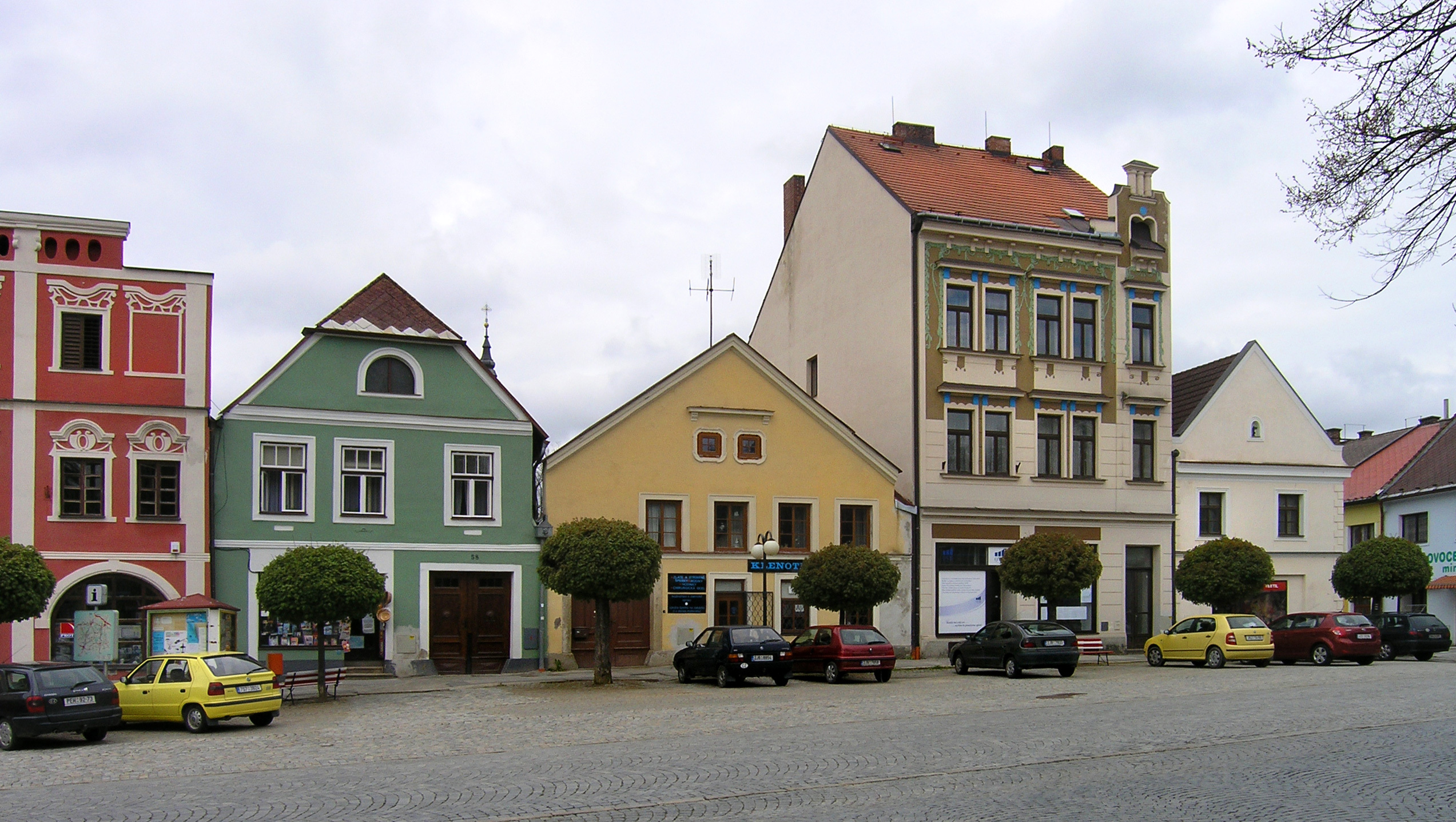
The square Náměstí Čsl. armády

The first written mention of Kamenice is from 1267. It was founded as a settlement below a castle in the early 13th century.

Kamenice nad Lipou regularly changed its owners, who belonged more to the lower nobles. Notable was the rule of Jan of Šelmberk in 1476–1497, during which Kamenice obtained various rights and privileges, and the Malovec family, which had the Gothic castle rebuilt in the Renaissance style in 1580–1583. In 1623, the manor was bought by the family of Paradies of Escheide, which owned it for 70 years and oppressed the inhabitants and deprived the town of its privileges.

The town economically prospered in the 18th and 19th centuries. In the first half of the 18th century, silver and iron ores were mined and subsequently hammer mills were founded. In 1839, a wool classing workshop was set up in one of the castle's wings. In 1875, glassworks replaced the hammer mills. In 1906, the narrow-gauge railway was built.

== Demographics ==
Historical population

Year	Pop.	±%
1869	3,663	—
1880	3,546	−3.2%
1890	3,329	−6.1%
1900	3,265	−1.9%
1910	3,369	+3.2%

Year	Pop.	±%
1921	3,194	−5.2%
1930	2,948	−7.7%
1950	2,958	+0.3%
1961	3,149	+6.5%
1970	3,451	+9.6%

Year	Pop.	±%
1980	3,951	+14.5%
1991	4,202	+6.4%
2001	4,220	+0.4%
2011	3,893	−7.7%
2021	3,603	−7.4%

Source: Censuses

== Transport ==
The I/34 road (part of the European route E551, the section from Jindřichův Hradec to Pelhřimov) runs through the municipal territory.

Kamenice nad Lipou is located on the Jindřichův Hradec narrow-gauge railway, leading from Jindřichův Hradec to Obrataň. It serves mostly as a tourist attraction.

== Culture ==
Kamenice nad Lipou hosts the annual summer festival Hračkobraní, which continues the tradition of toy making in the town. The first year of the festival took place in 2006. The festival includes a presentation of wooden toys and their manufacturers and designers, workshops with the opportunity to try making simple toys, and other accompanying programs.

== Sights ==
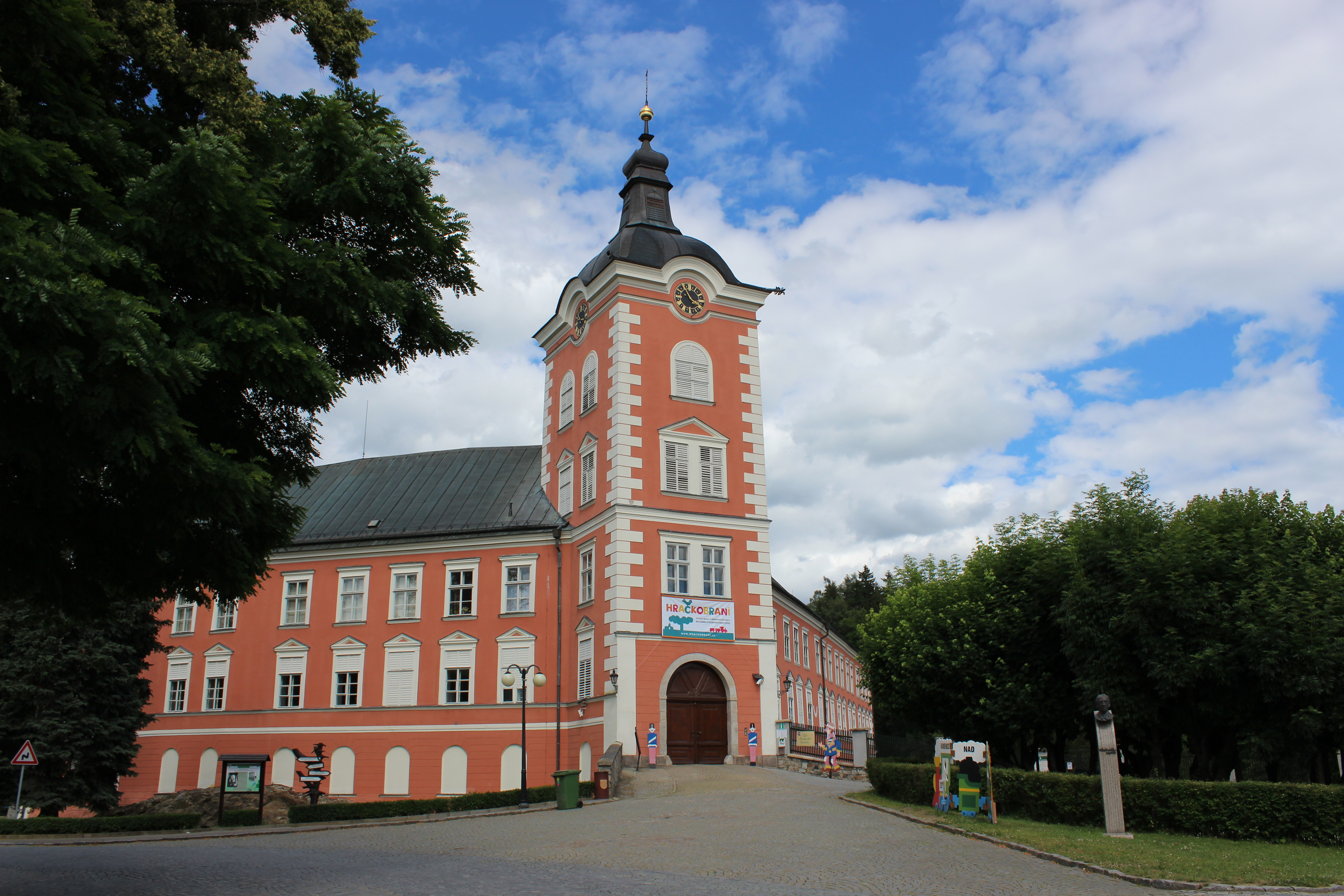
Kamenice nad Lipou Castle

The most important landmark is the Kamenice nad Lipou Castle. Its current appearance is from 1842, when it was rebuilt in the Neoclassical style. Today it is owned by the Museum of Decorative Arts in Prague, which has a depository here, and an exhibition for the public. The southern wing serves as the town museum. The castle includes an English park. The 700–800 years old linden tree after which the town was named is still in the park.

The Church of All Saints is a Renaissance building with a Gothic core. The tower was added in the 17th century.

== Notable people ==
- Vítězslav Novák (1870–1949), composer
- Ella Tvrdková (1878–1918), opera singer

== See also ==
- 100728 Kamenice n Lipou, an asteroid named in honour of the town
