= Museum of Textile in Česká Skalice =

Textile museum in Česká Skalice, Czech Republic

Coordinates: 50°23′44.39″N 16°2′13.19″E

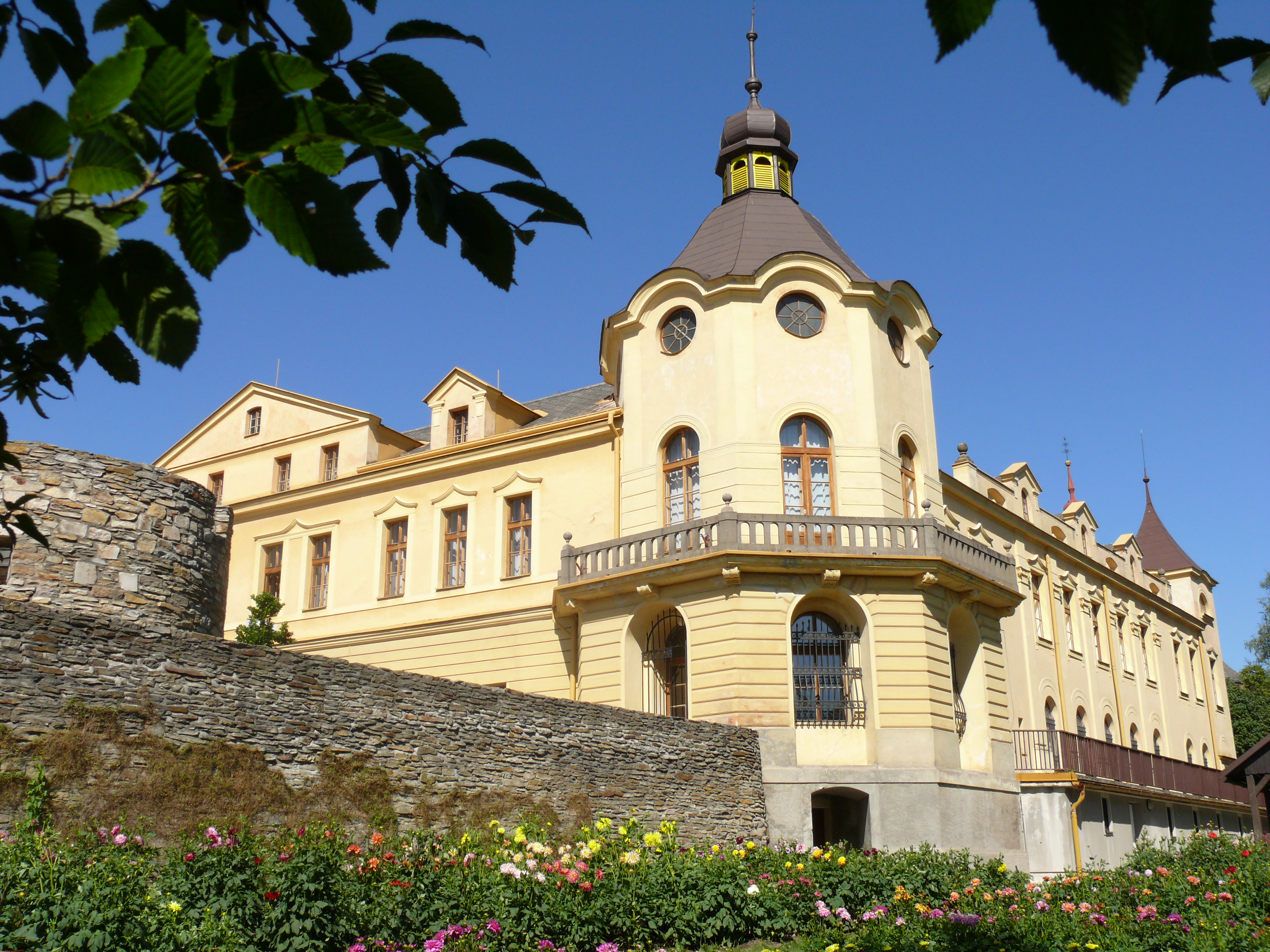
Museum of Textile in Česká Skalice

The textile museum in Česká Skalice is the only Czech museum specialized in the history of textile production. Its displays and collections represent a unique body of work reflecting the development of the textile industry, especially cloth printing, in the Czech Republic and abroad. The museum, a branch of the Museum of Decorative Arts in Prague, holds regular exhibitions.

== Textile exhibitions ==
- Cotton-production in Eastern Bohemia
- Collaboration of artists with textile printing
- History of textile production in the Czech lands until the end of the 18th century
- History of textile printing and auxiliary technologies in manufactories and factories

== See also ==
- The Chateau at Klášterec nad Ohří
- Josef Sudek Gallery
- The Chateau at Kamenice nad Lipou
