= Ella Tvrdková =

Czech opera singer

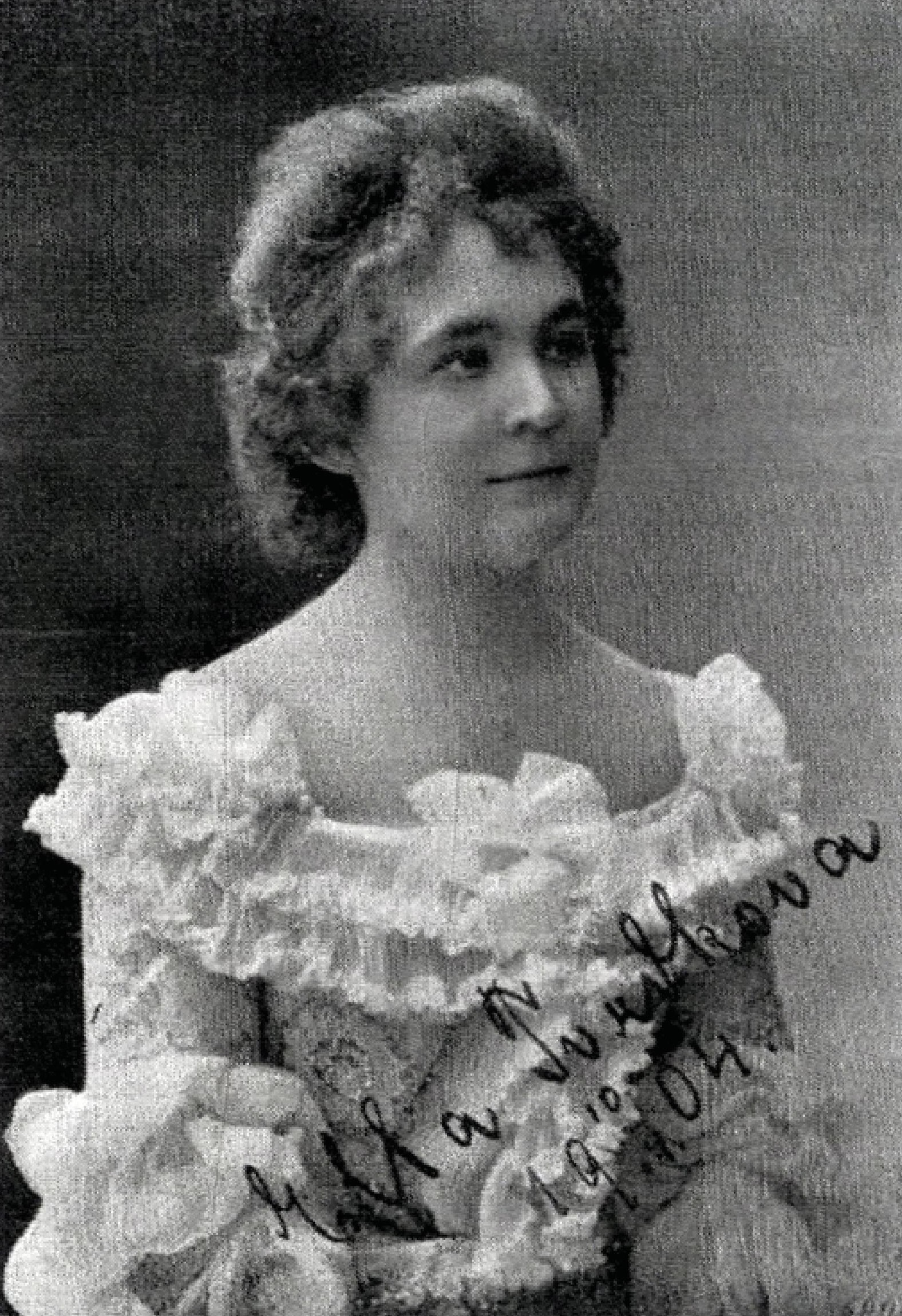
- Ella Tvrdková, from a Czech publication in 1905
- Born: 19 February 1878; Kamenice nad Lipou, Austria-Hungary
- Died: 8 November 1918 (aged 40); Krumbach
- Other names: Ella Tordek
- Occupation: Opera singer

Ella Tvrdková (19 February 1878 – 8 November 1918), also written as Ella Tordek, was a Czech opera singer.

== Early life ==
Alžběta Anna Tvrdková was born in Kamenice nad Lipou, the daughter of Václav Tvrdek. She studied voice with Mathilde Mallinger at the Prague Conservatory, with further studies in Berlin.

== Career ==
Tvrdková was with the Prague National Theatre from 1899 to 1901. In 1901, she sang a small part in the premiere of Dvořák's Rusalka. From 1901 to 1913, she sang under the name "Ella Tordek" with the Munich Court Opera, and a regular performer at Munich's Wagner and Mozart festivals. In 1913, she created the role of Rosaura in the original cast of Ermanno Wolf-Ferrari's opera Le donne curiose, in Milan.

Tordek made recordings, including a duet with Luise Hofer, singing Berlioz's "Nuit paisible et sereine", from Béatrice et Bénédict, and duets with Friedrich Brodersen, Anton Rubinstein's "Wanderers Nachtlied" and Mozart's "Reich mir die Hand", from Don Giovanni.

== Personal life ==
Ella Tvrdková married Gustav Gerhäuser in 1909. She died in 1918, aged 40, in Krumbach, Bavaria.
