= Porcelain museum of Klášterec nad Ohří =

Czech porcelain museum

Coordinates: 50°23′02.6″N 13°10′25.0″E

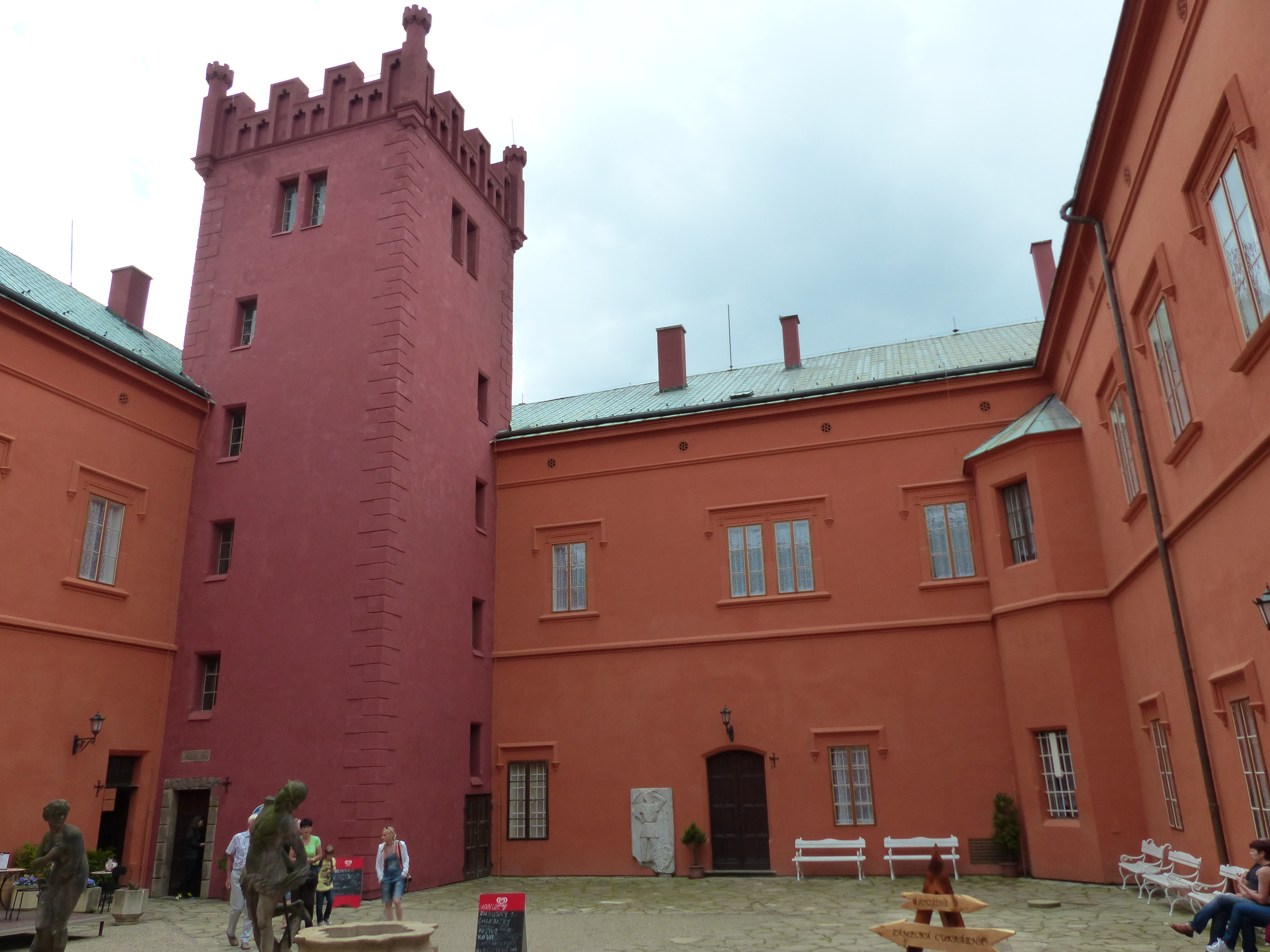
Klášterec nad Ohří Castle

The Klášterec nad Ohří Porcelain Museum (Czech: Muzeum porcelánu v Klášterci nad Ohří) is a porcelain museum in the Klášterec nad Ohří Castle in Klášterec nad Ohří, Czech Republic. It is affiliated with the Museum of Decorative Arts in Prague (UPM). The site was chosen for the museum because in 1794, the third oldest and second then-still active porcelain factory in the Czech Republic, Thun porcelain factory (closed in 2024), was established here.

The interior was restored in 1950–1952. The museum contains around 12,000 exhibits.

Part of the exhibition presents porcelain from China and Japan from the UPM collections. The beginning of European production is documented in the next part of the exhibition. In addition, the fates of the original owners of the exhibited items, who were victims of the holocaust, are described.

On the occasion of the 140th anniversary of the foundation of the Thun, a long-term exhibition of European, especially Czech, porcelain from the collections of the UPM in Prague was installed here in 1954. During the celebration of Thun's 200th anniversary, it was restored and published in a catalog.

== See also ==
- Porzellanikon (in Hohenberg an der Eger)
- Karlsbad coffee maker (1878)
- Meissen porcelain
- Manufacture nationale de Sèvres
- Frankenthal Porcelain Factory
