= Ciboušov =

Village in the Czech Republic

- Village
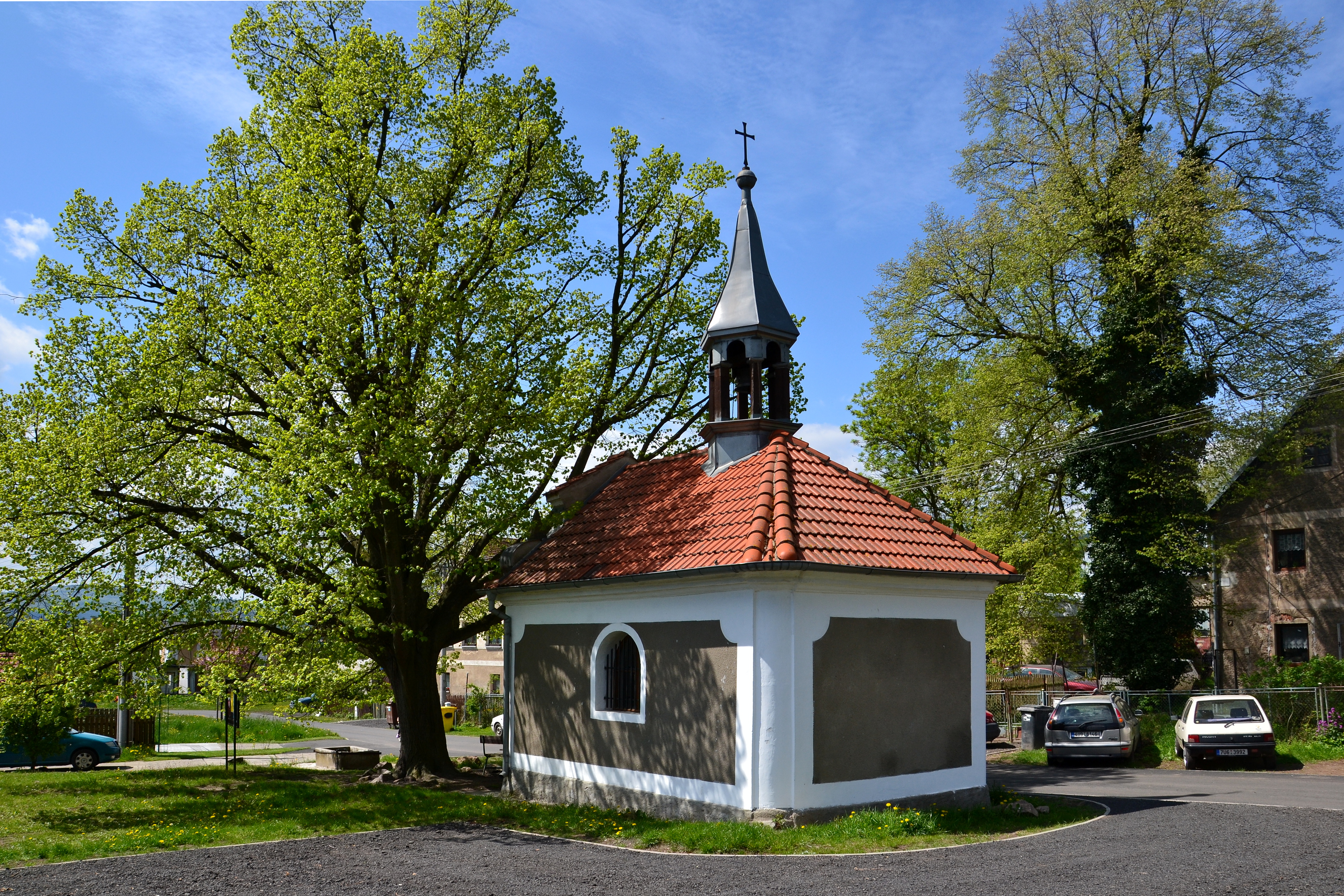
- Chapel in Ciboušov

- Location in the Czech Republic
- Coordinates: 50°24′N 13°12′E
- Country: Czech Republic
- Region: Ústí nad Labem
- District: Chomutov
- Municipality: Klášterec nad Ohří
- First mentioned: 1367

Area
  - Total: 5.78 km^{2} (2.23 sq mi)
- Elevation: 370 m (1,210 ft)

Population (2021)
  - Total: 98
  - Density: 17/km^{2} (44/sq mi)
- Time zone: UTC+1 (CET)
  - Summer (DST): UTC+2 (CEST)
- Postal code: 431 51

Ciboušov (German: Zibich) is a village and administrative part of Klášterec nad Ohří in Chomutov District in the Ústí nad Labem Region of the Czech Republic.

The first recorded mention of Ciboušov dates back to 1367. At that time, the little village was subordinate to the castle of Hasištejn. Since then, it has often changed owners. Šumburks, Fictums and then was added to other villages or towns as their part (Miřetice, Rašovice, Klášterec). The population has been decreasing since the 19th century—from 99 in 1863 to just 29 in 1991.
