= Kamenice nad Lipou Castle =

Castle in the Vysočina Region, Czech Republic

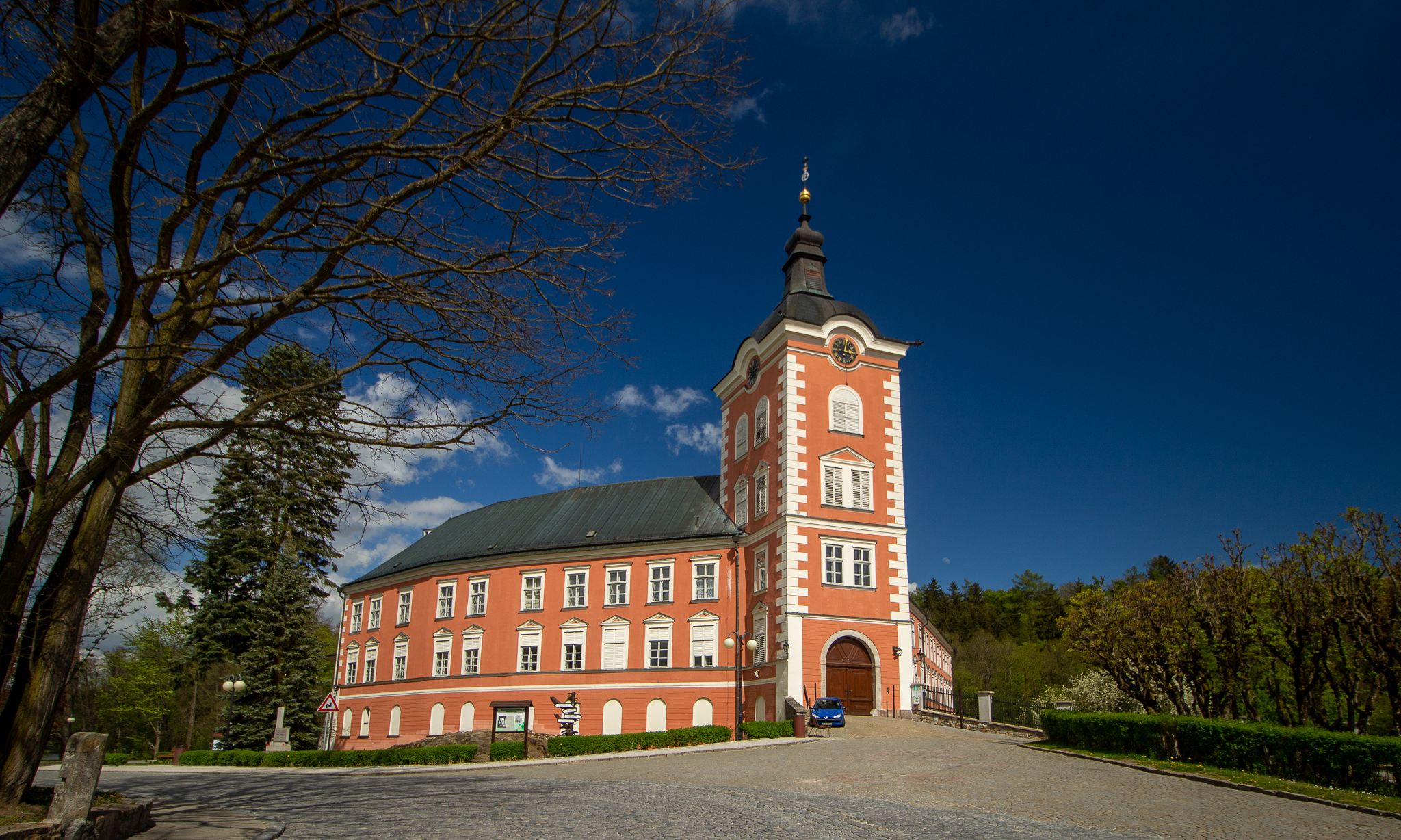
- Front view

General information
- Status: museum
- Location: Kamenice nad Lipou, Vysočina Region, Czech Republic
- Coordinates: 49°18′9″N 15°4′45″E
- Year built: 1248; 1580–1583; 1839—1842

Aerial view of the castle

Kamenice nad Lipou Castle (Czech: zámek Kamenice nad Lipou) is a Neoclassical castle in Kamenice nad Lipou in the Vysočina Region of the Czech Republic. Today it houses a museum, managed by the Museum of Decorative Arts in Prague.

== History ==
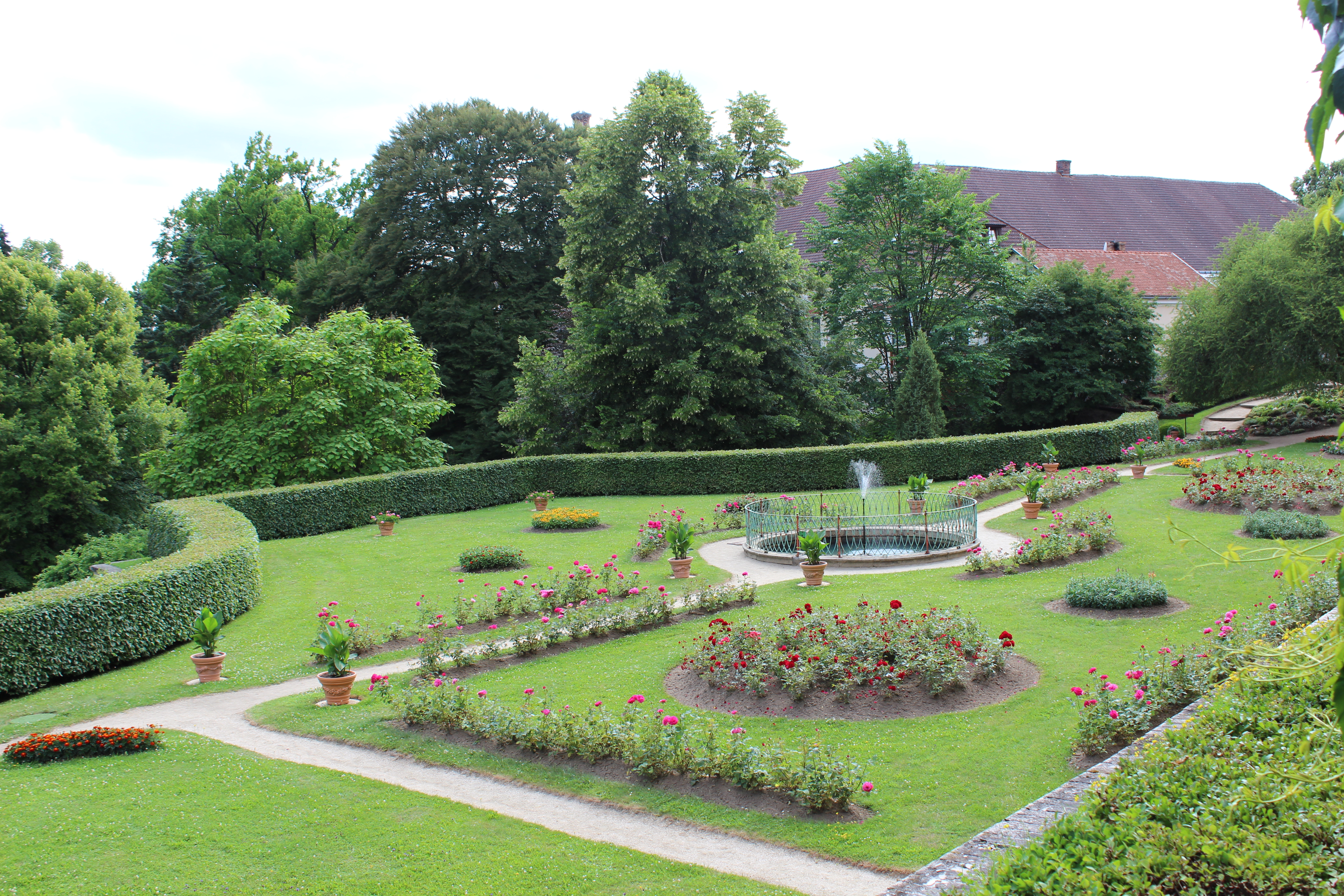
Castle park

The Kamenice nad Lipou Castle was built in the middle of the 16th century and in 1580–1583, when the original castle from 1248 was converted into a Renaissance mansion graced by a courtyard with arcades and a garden. The entrance tower was built in 1744. In the early 19th century, F. Rilke (grandfather of Rainer Maria Rilke) had the castle modified. In 1839–1842, the Geymüller family had rebuilt the castle into its present Neoclassical appearance. The castle is surrounded by an English park featuring a linden tree estimated to be 700–800 years old, after which the town was named (nad Lipou = 'at linden tree').

The Geymüller family were the last private owners of the castle. In 1945–1998, the castle was used as a sanatorium for children. From 1998, the castle is managed by the Museum of Decorative Arts in Prague (UPM), which has a depository here. Extensive restoration work of the building took place in 1999–2004. The large Renaissance hall in the east wing and the large Gothic hall were restored.

From 1958, the castle is protected as a cultural monument.

== Museum ==
The UPM presents its collections in the castle. Among the most important collections is Cesty designu ("Design Journeys"), which is a collection of 19th and 20th century furniture from the Czech lands and the rest of Europe.

The Renaissance Hall houses a permanent exhibition called Mříže, klíče, zámky ("Lattices, Keys, Locks"). It presents the locksmith craft. In the cellars of the castle there are samples from the garden ceramics collection. Hledej hračku ("Search for a Toy") is an exhibition with a selection from UPM's extensive toy collection, including a set of historical dolls from the 19th to the early 20th centuries. The castle also has an exhibition dedicated to the Geymüller family.

The southern wing of the castle is used by the town of Kamenice nad Lipou and serves as the town museum, called Museum for the Senses. The permanent exhibition documents the history of the town.

== Festival ==
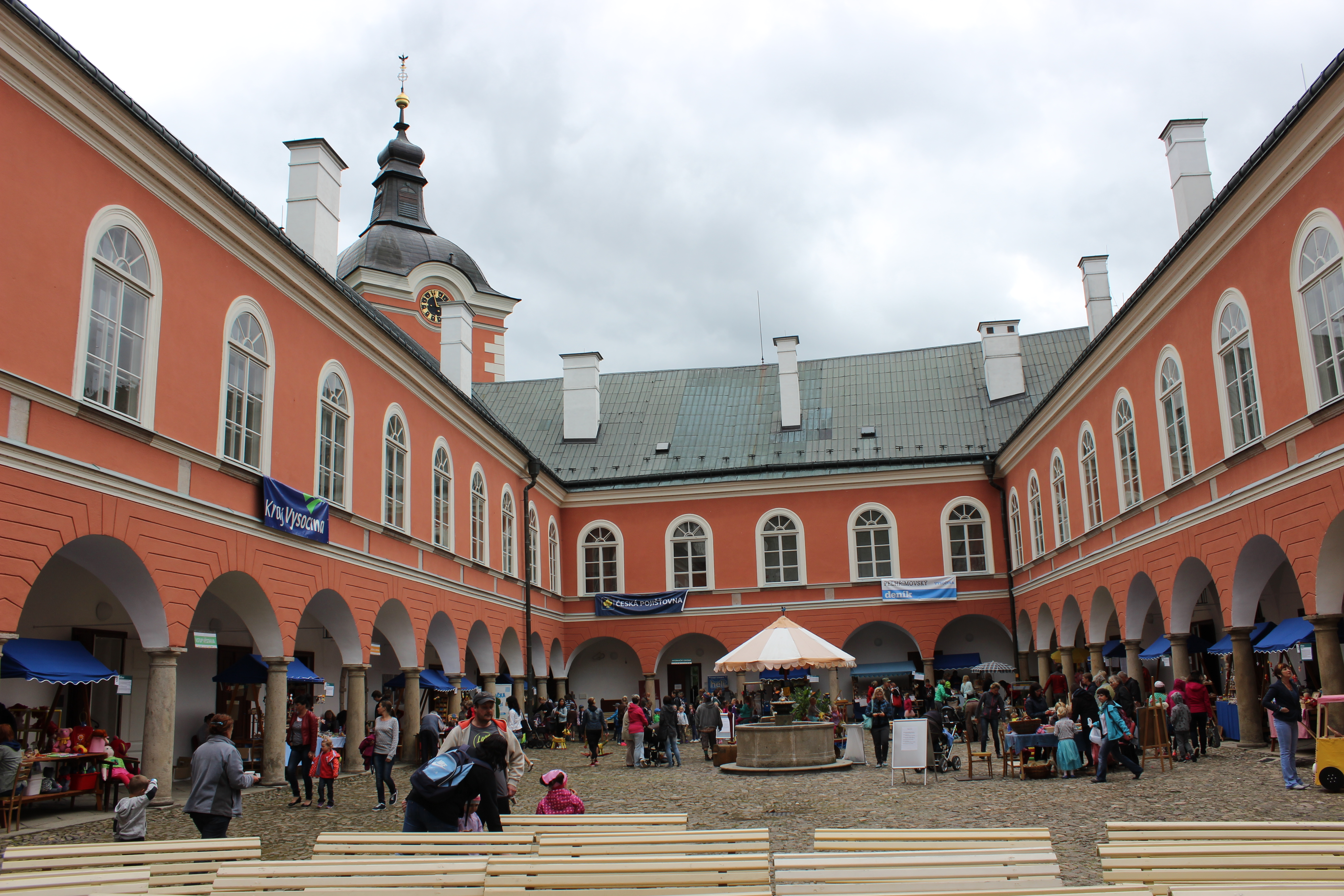
Courtyard of the castle during the 2016 Hračkobraní festival

The castle hosts the annual summer festival Hračkobraní, which continues the tradition of toy making in the town. The first year of the festival took place in 2006. The festival includes a presentation of wooden toys and their manufacturers and designers, workshops with the opportunity to try making simple toys, and other accompanying programs.

== See also ==
- Museum of Decorative Arts in Prague
- Museum of Textile in Česká Skalice
- Josef Sudek Gallery
- Klášterec nad Ohří Castle
