= Egerberk =

Castle ruins in the Czech Republic

Coordinates: 50°22′01″N 13°11′04″E

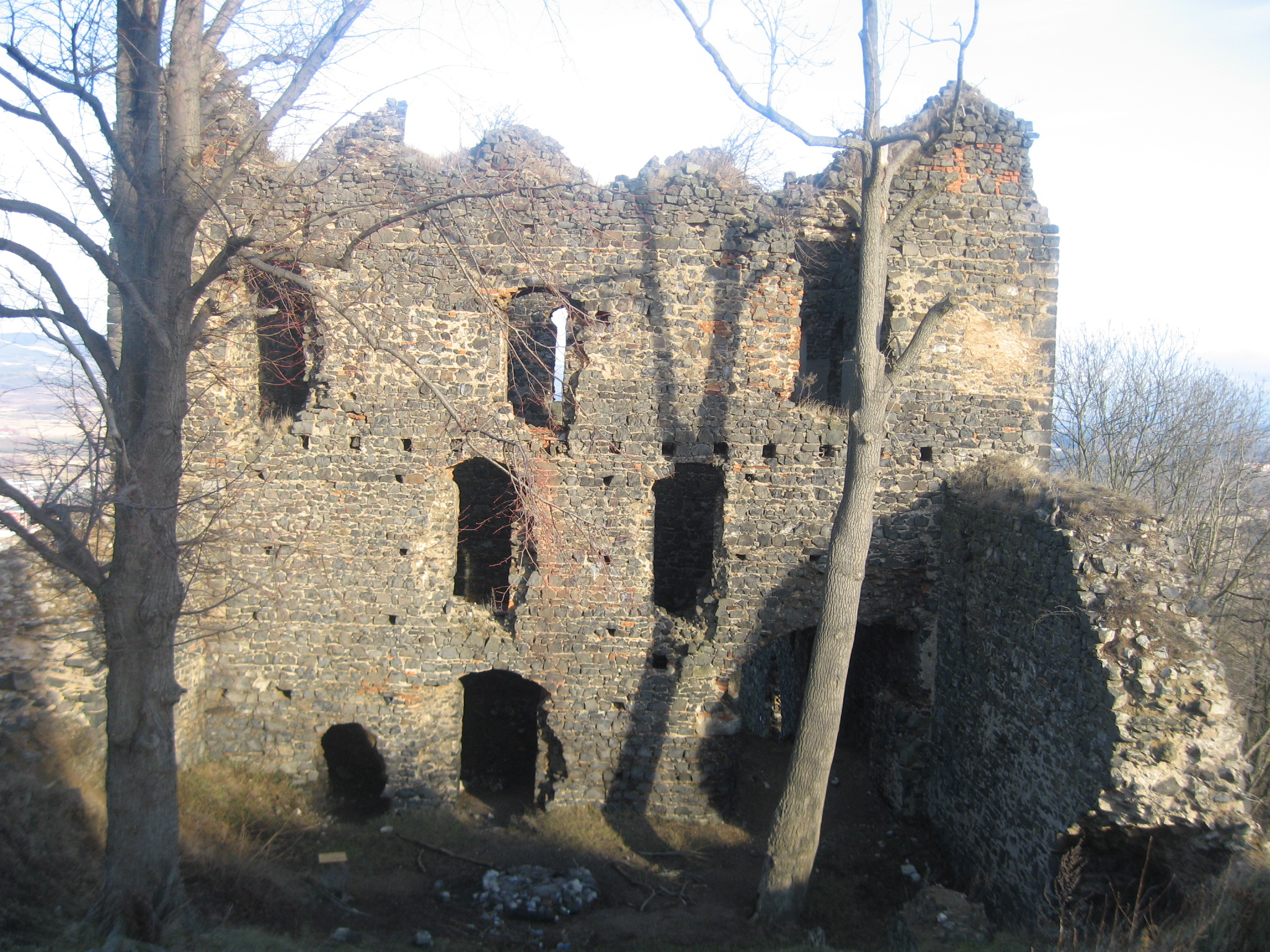
Remains of the castle palace

Castle location in the Czech Republic

Egerberk (or Egerberg, in Czech Lestkov) is a ruined castle near Klášterec nad Ohří. The name is derived from the German name of the Ohře river - Eger => Egerberg. The Czech name is by the village Lestkov, now an administrative part of Klášterec nad Ohří.

First mentioned in 1317, the castle belonged to Wilhelm who first started to bear the attribute name "of Egerberg". Wilhelm was a friend of John of Luxembourg and accompanied him on his journeys. His brother Fritz was given several villages and started to bear the name of one of them - Pětipsy. The castle was then sold to the House of Šumburk from a nearby castle. In 1384 Egerberk was added to the property of the House of Škopek and Jindřich Škopek z Dubé started a large-scale reconstruction. At the end of the 16th century the castle was already abandoned.
