= Klášterec nad Ohří =

- Town
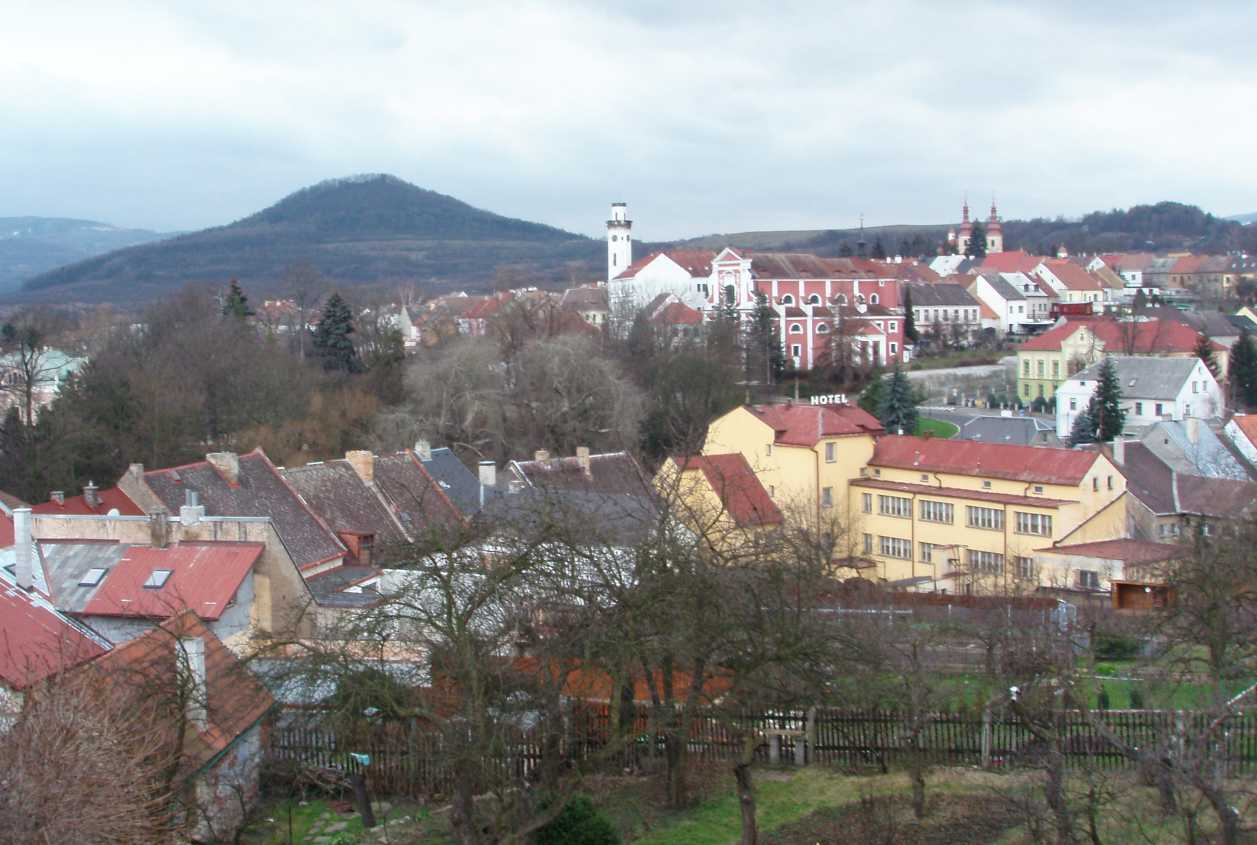
- General view of the town

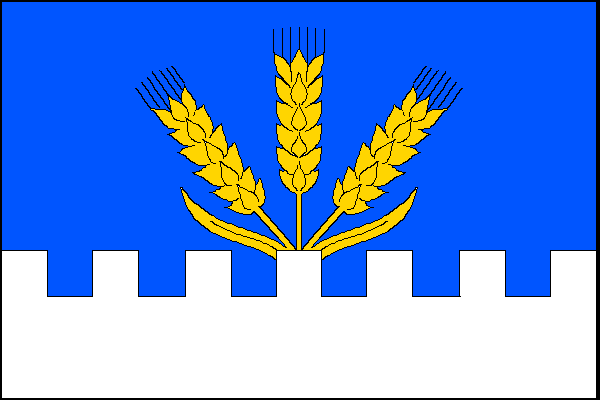
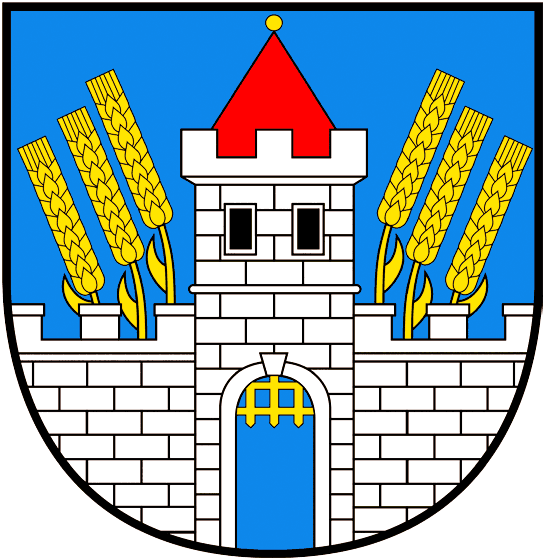
- Flag Coat of arms

- Location in the Czech Republic
- Coordinates: 50°23′25″N 13°10′19″E
- Country: Czech Republic
- Region: Ústí nad Labem
- District: Chomutov
- First mentioned: 1352

Government
  - Mayor: Štefan Drozd

Area
  - Total: 53.79 km^{2} (20.77 sq mi)
- Elevation: 320 m (1,050 ft)

Population (2026-01-01)
  - Total: 13,980
  - Density: 259.9/km^{2} (673.1/sq mi)
- Time zone: UTC+1 (CET)
  - Summer (DST): UTC+2 (CEST)
- Postal code: 431 51
- Website: www.klasterec.cz

Klášterec nad Ohří (Czech pronunciation: [ˈklaːʃtɛrɛts ˈnat oɦr̝iː]; German: Klösterle an der Eger) is a town in Chomutov District in the Ústí nad Labem Region of the Czech Republic. It has about 14,000 inhabitants. The town is located on the Ohře River, on the border between the Most Basin, Doupov Mountains and Ore Mountains.

Klášterec nad Ohří was known for its porcelain production, but it ended in 2024. The historic town centre is well preserved and is protected as an urban monument zone. The most important monument of the town is the Klášterec nad Ohří Castle.

== Administrative division ==
Klášterec nad Ohří consists of 12 municipal parts (in brackets population according to the 2021 census):

- Klášterec nad Ohří (5,511)
- Miřetice u Klášterce nad Ohří (7,490)
- Ciboušov (98)
- Hradiště (30)
- Klášterecká Jeseň (89)
- Lestkov (55)
- Mikulovice (136)
- Rašovice (138)
- Suchý Důl (9)
- Šumná (0)
- Útočiště (271)
- Vernéřov (0)

== Etymology ==
The settlement was named Klášterec (diminutive from klášter, meaning "little monastery") after the branch of the monastery founded here by monks from Postoloprty. Since 1921, the town has been named Klášterec nad Ohří to distinguish from other places with the same name.

== Geography ==
Klášterec nad Ohří is located about 17 kilometres (11 mi) southwest of Chomutov and 27 km (17 mi) northeast of Karlovy Vary. The Ohře River flows through the town.

The municipal territory lies in three geomorphological regions: the southern part lies in the Doupov Mountains, the central part lies in the western tip of the Most Basin, and the northern part lies in the Ore Mountains. The highest point, located on the northern municipal border, is the hill Volyňský vrch at 727 m (2,385 ft) above sea level.

== History ==
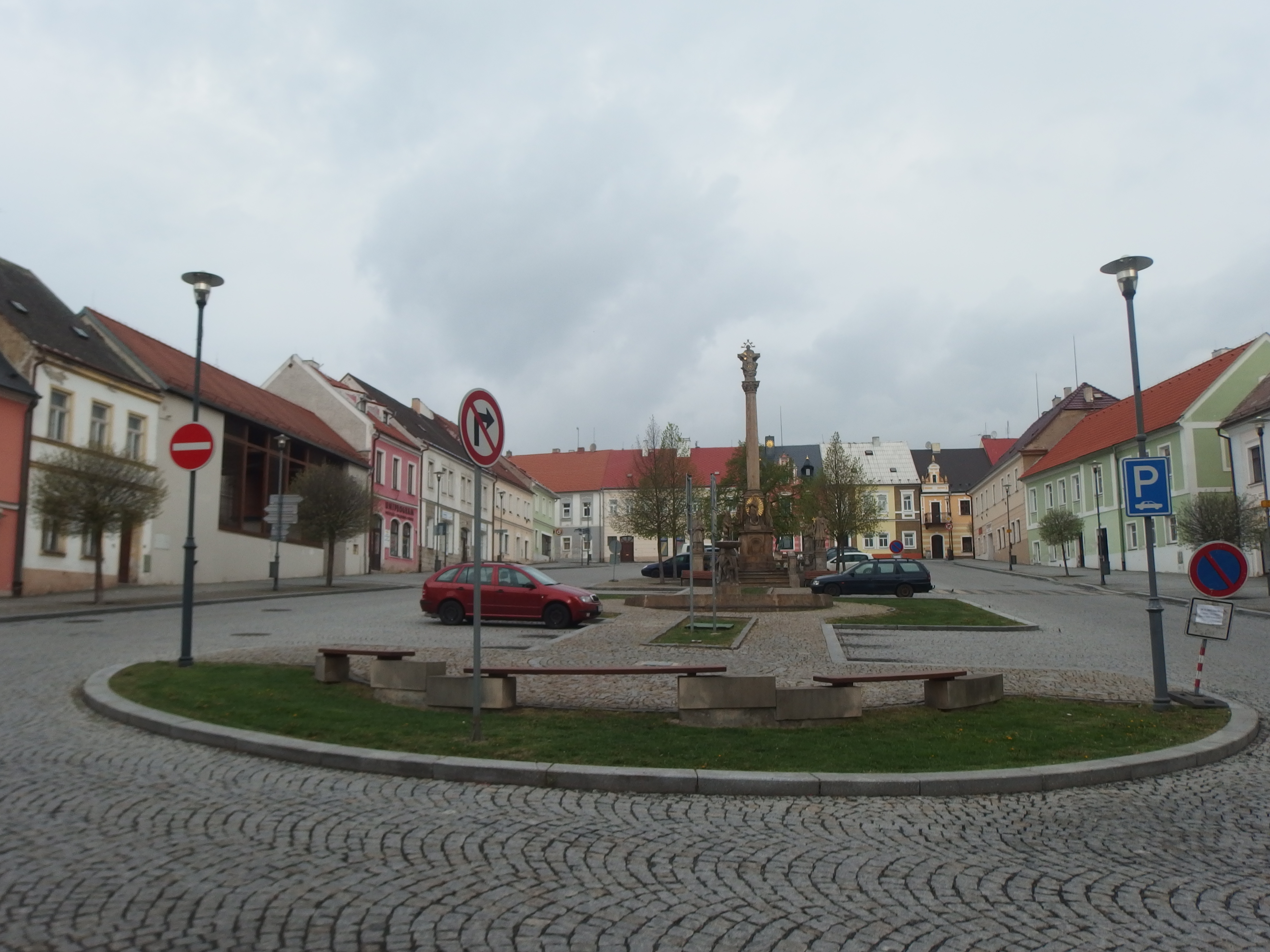
The square Náměstí Dr. Eduarda Beneše, historic centre

Between 1150 and 1250, a settlement and a small monastery were established by Benedictines from Postoloprty. It is not known, whether the settlement or the monastery is older. The first written mention of Klášterec is from 1352.

The Hussite Wars did not affect the town too much. In the half of the 15th century, Klášterec was already referred to as a market town. At the beginning of the 16th century, the town wall was completed. During the 16th century, houses were built behind this wall, which created the so-called "lower town".

In 1794, the oldest porcelain factory and the second oldest factory in Bohemia overall was founded. In the years to come the town grew in importance as one of the earliest European regions of porcelain production and became famous for its porcelain. The original owners of the Klášterec nad Ohří porcelain factory, the Princes of Thun und Hohenstein, were in 1945 expelled from Czechoslovakia along with the remaining ethnic German population.

Over the years, a number of settlements were attached to Klášterec nad Ohří, most of them only in the second half of the 20th century, some of then already as extinct villages. Šumná and Útočiště have been administered by Klášterec since its inception, and Lestkov has belonged to Klášterec since the beginning of the 17th century. In 1950, Miřetice was joined, in 1961, Klášterecká Jeseň (including the area of extinct villages of Kunov and Vysoké), Ciboušov, Rašovice and Suchý Důl were joined, and finally in 1988 Hradiště (including the area of extinct villages of Pavlov and Potočná), Vernéřov and Mikulovice were joined.

== Demographics ==
Historical population

| Year | Pop. | ±% |
|---|---|---|
| 1869 | 5,800 | — |
| 1880 | 5,967 | +2.9% |
| 1890 | 6,190 | +3.7% |
| 1900 | 6,486 | +4.8% |
| 1910 | 7,062 | +8.9% |

| Year | Pop. | ±% |
|---|---|---|
| 1921 | 6,627 | −6.2% |
| 1930 | 7,336 | +10.7% |
| 1950 | 4,770 | −35.0% |
| 1961 | 5,838 | +22.4% |
| 1970 | 9,173 | +57.1% |

| Year | Pop. | ±% |
|---|---|---|
| 1980 | 13,255 | +44.5% |
| 1991 | 16,213 | +22.3% |
| 2001 | 15,757 | −2.8% |
| 2011 | 14,591 | −7.4% |
| 2021 | 13,829 | −5.2% |

Source: Censuses

== Economy ==
The company Thun 1794 a.s., which has been the largest Czech porcelain manufacturer, produced porcelain in Klášterec nad Ohří in a factory with a capacity of approximately 1,000 tonnes per year. In 2024, after 230 years of existence, the production ended.

== Transport ==
The I/13 road (part of the European route E442) from Karlovy Vary to Liberec runs through the town.

Klášterec nad Ohří is located on the interregional railway line Prague–Cheb.

== Sights ==
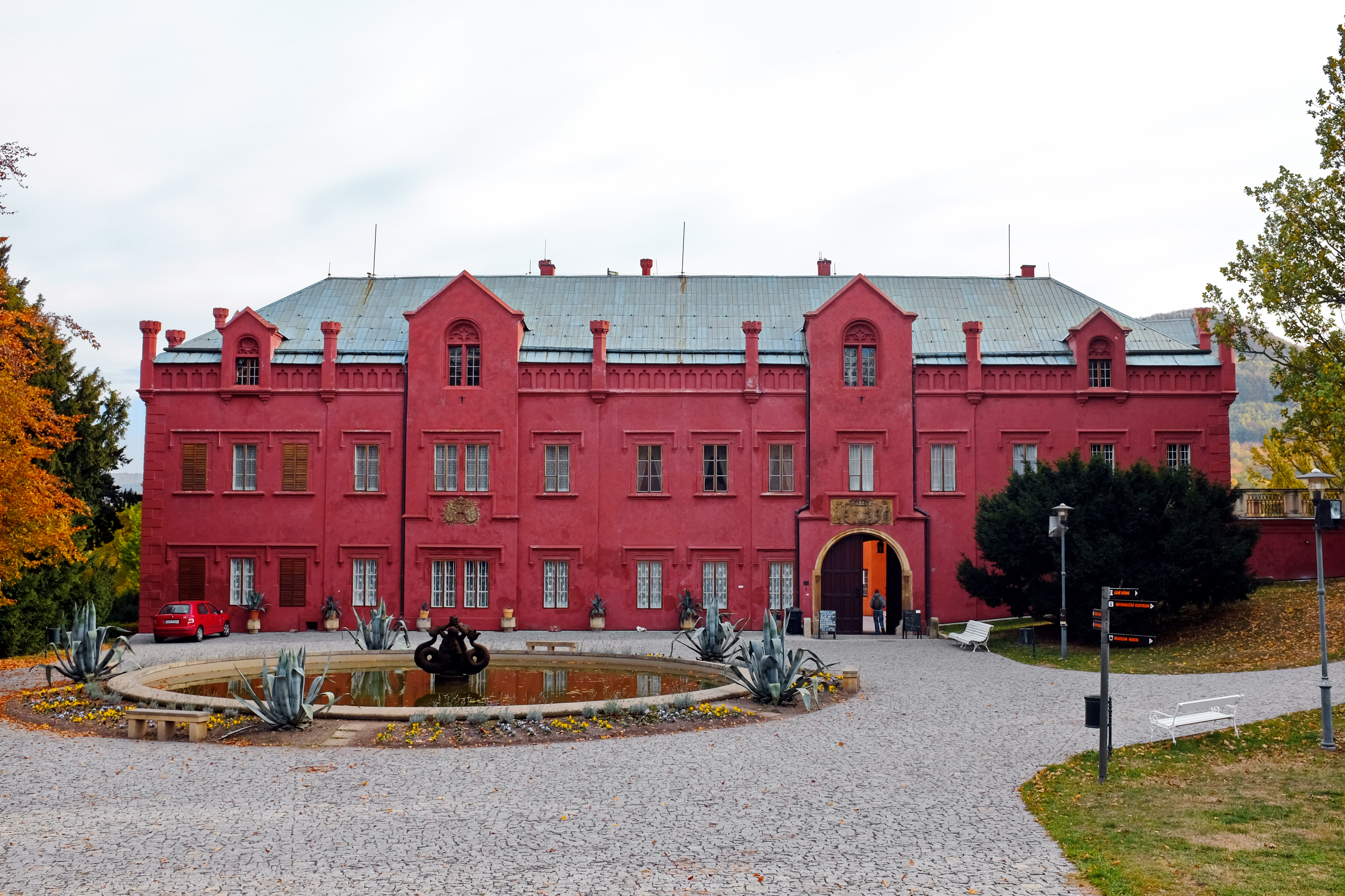
Klášterec nad Ohří Castle

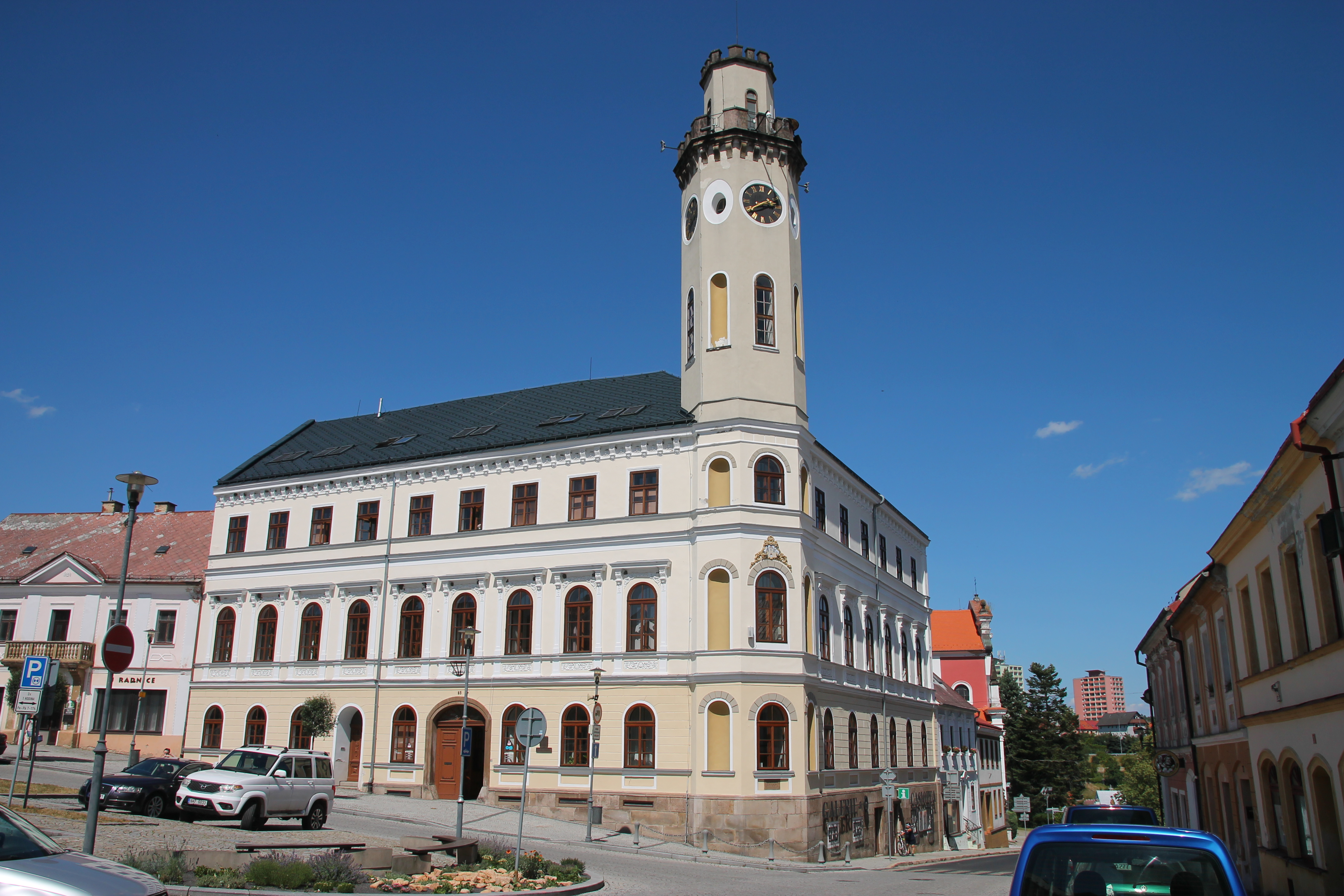
Town hall

The historic centre is made up of the square Náměstí Dr. Eduarda Beneše with its surroundings, including the castle complex. The main building on the square is the town hall. It was built in the second half of the 19th century, after the original town hall burned down several times.

The main landmark of the town is the Klášterec nad Ohří Castle. It was created by the reconstruction of the manor house in 1590–1618 and rebuilt to the present Neo-Gothic style in 1856–1860. It is open to the public and it includes a porcelain museum, and large and dendrologically significant English-style park with the sala terrena (a one-storey summer house) and a set of chapels of the Seven Pains of the Virgin Mary from the 1690s.

The Church of the Holy Trinity was built in 1665–1670 by plans of Carlo Lurago. It contains tomb of the Thun family.

A tourist destination are the ruins of the Egerberk castle, located above the village of Lestkov.

== Notable people ==
- Michael Brokoff (1686–1721), sculptor

== Twin towns – sister cities ==
Klášterec nad Ohří is twinned with:

- Großrückerswalde, Germany

== See also ==
- Karlsbad coffee maker (originally created in Klášterec nad Ohří in 1878)
