= Museum of Decorative Arts in Prague =

Art museum in Prague, Czech Republic

- Uměleckoprůmyslové muzeum v Praze

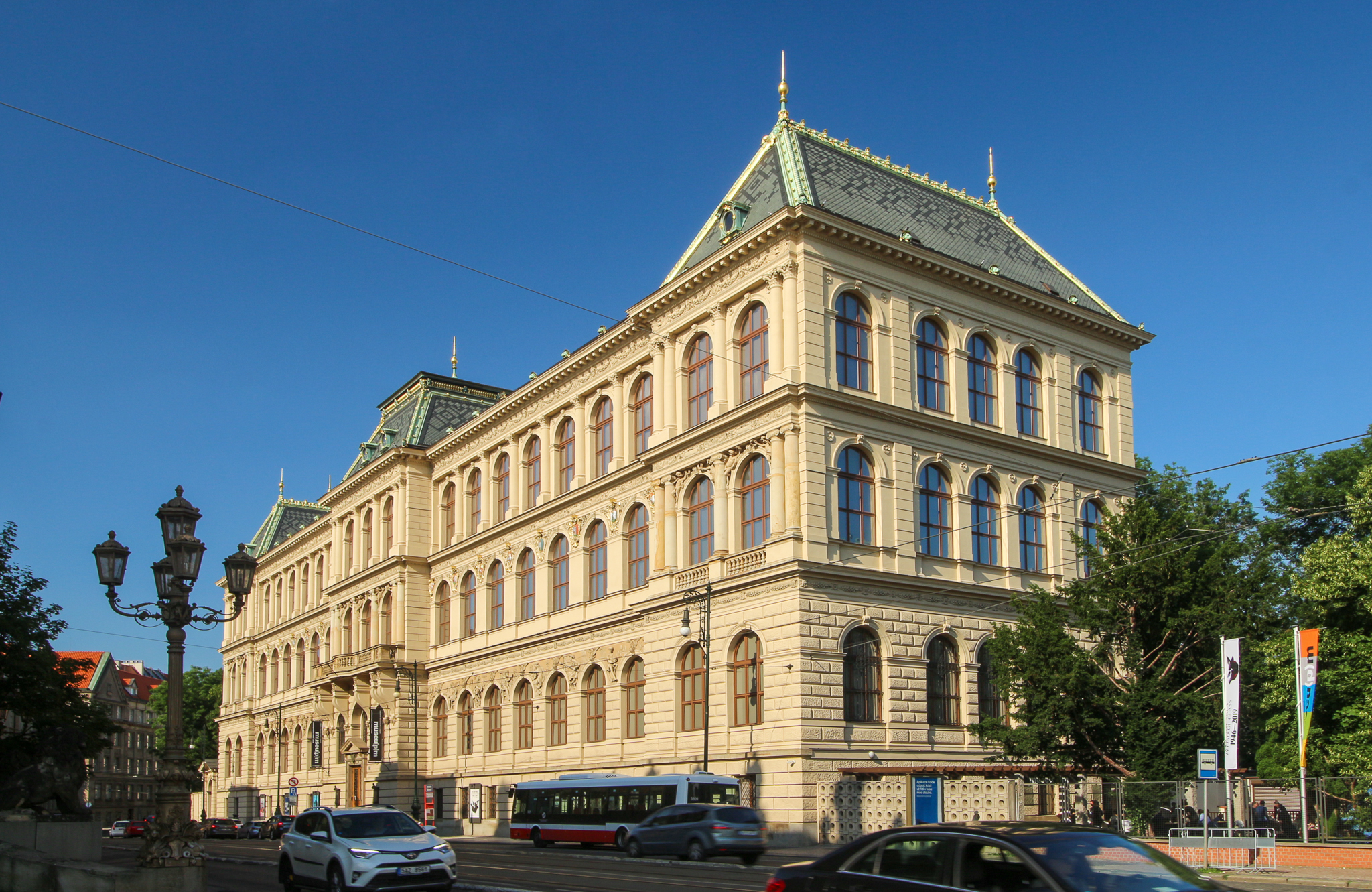
- Main Building of Museum of Decorative Arts
- Interactive fullscreen map
- Established: 1885; 141 years ago
- Location: 17. listopadu, Prague 1, Czech Republic, 110 00
- Coordinates: 50°05′23″N 14°24′59″E
- Website: https://www.upm.cz/?language=en

Founded in 1885, the Prague Museum of Decorative Arts (Czech: Uměleckoprůmyslové muzeum v Praze or UPM) is housed in a Neo-Renaissance edifice built from 1897 to 1899 after the designs of architect Josef Schulz. It opened in 1900 with exhibitions on the first floor. The museum's rich collections include decorative and applied arts and design work ranging from Late Antiquity to the present day with focus on European objects, particularly arts and crafts created in the Bohemian lands. The impressive interior of the permanent exhibition, "Stories of Materials," offers visitors an excursion into the history and development of decorative arts in the disciplines of glass, ceramics, graphic art, design, metal, wood and other materials, as well as objects such as jewellery, clocks and watches, textiles, fashion, toys and furniture.

== Mission ==
The museum in Prague collects and preserves for future generations examples of historical and contemporary crafts as well as applied arts and design—in both national and international contexts. The staff and directors believe in the harmony between function, quality and beauty; its claimed ambition is to inspire, educate and entertain in a unique way.

== History ==
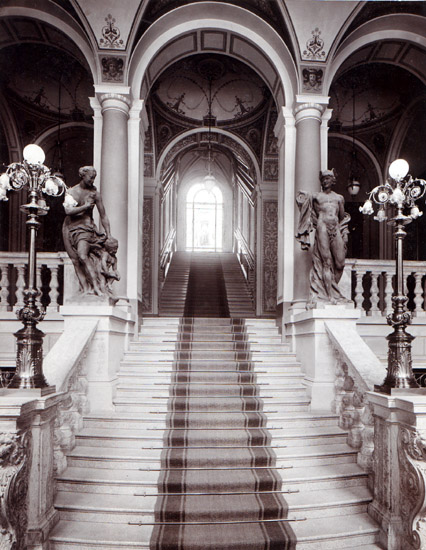
Entrance to exhibitions

In 1885, the foundation of the Museum of Decorative Arts in Prague reflected the dramatic development of Czech society at the time. Following the establishment of a similar institution in Brno in 1873, the Prague museum soon became an important cultural and educational center in the Crown Lands of Bohemia, then part of the Austro-Hungarian Empire. The unfavorable impact of the Industrial Revolution on the aesthetic appearance and, consequently, the quality of products had for a long time been the subject of justified criticisms from artists, theorists and the public. The idea of establishing a permanent exhibition of decorative and applied arts in Prague was realised through an exhibition arranged by the Arkadia Association in 1861 at the Old Town Hall in Prague. Another source of inspiration was the founding of a similar institution—the South Kensington Museum (now Victoria and Albert Museum), which opened in London in 1852 and originally contained a collection of objects of applied and decorative arts. More important for the Czech public, however, was the Österreichisches Museum für Kunst und Industrie, which opened in Vienna in 1864.

In 1868, in cooperation with the Vienna museum, the Prague Chamber of Trade and Commerce held an exhibition on Žofín Island of objects obtained from the Exposition Universelle d'Art et d'Industrie de 1867—International Exposition (1867)—supplemented by historical arts and crafts mostly from the collection of Vojtěch Lanna, who became the museum's most important donor and sponsor. In a period when funds and suitable buildings were hard to find, the promise of the exhibition area in the Rudolfinum (the House of the Artists) also contributed greatly to the birth of the museum.

== Past exhibitions ==
The Museum of Decorative Arts in Prague presented many notable exhibitions. They presented works of greatest Czech artists, such as Alphonse Mucha, Josef Sudek, Ladislav Sutnar, Libuše Niklová, Josef Koudelka, Václav Špála or Martin Janecký.

== Other exhibitions ==
In Prague

- The Josef Sudek Gallery, 24 Úvoz, Prague 1

A small gallery that holds photographic displays of works by the world-reputed photographer Josef Sudek and others.

- The House of the Black Madonna, 19 Ovocný trh, Prague 1

Apart from its fine arts collection, the National Gallery's Museum of Czech Cubism also contains Cubist furniture, glass and ceramics from UPM's holdings.

In Chateaux and Elsewhere

- Kamenice nad Lipou Chateau, 1 Náměstí Čsl, Armády

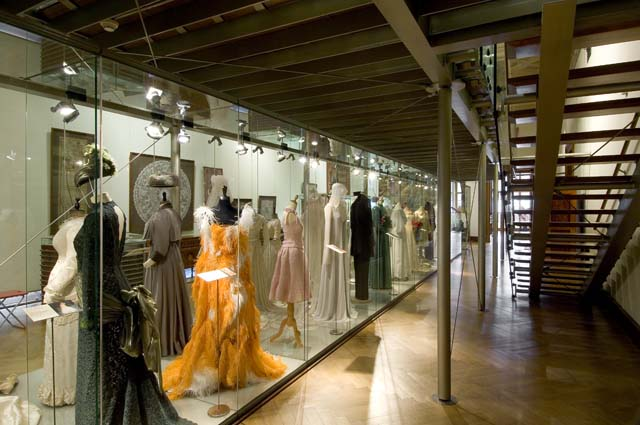
Story of Fibre

Displays of wrought-iron objects, children's toys, the study collection of 19th- and 20th-century furniture from the museum's holdings. The "Museum of the Senses"—an installation of the Municipal Museum in Kamenice, and short-term exhibitions.

- Porcelain museum of Klášterec nad Ohří in the Chateau Klášterec nad Ohří, Chomutovská 1, 431 51 Klášterec nad Ohří

An exhibition of Bohemian porcelain, with examples of Chinese and Japanese wares and porcelain produced in Europe.

- Chateau Nové Hrady, 1 Nové Hrady (near Litomyšl)

The exhibition examines the art of furniture-making throughout the ages: from the Baroque to the Art Nouveau.

== Library ==
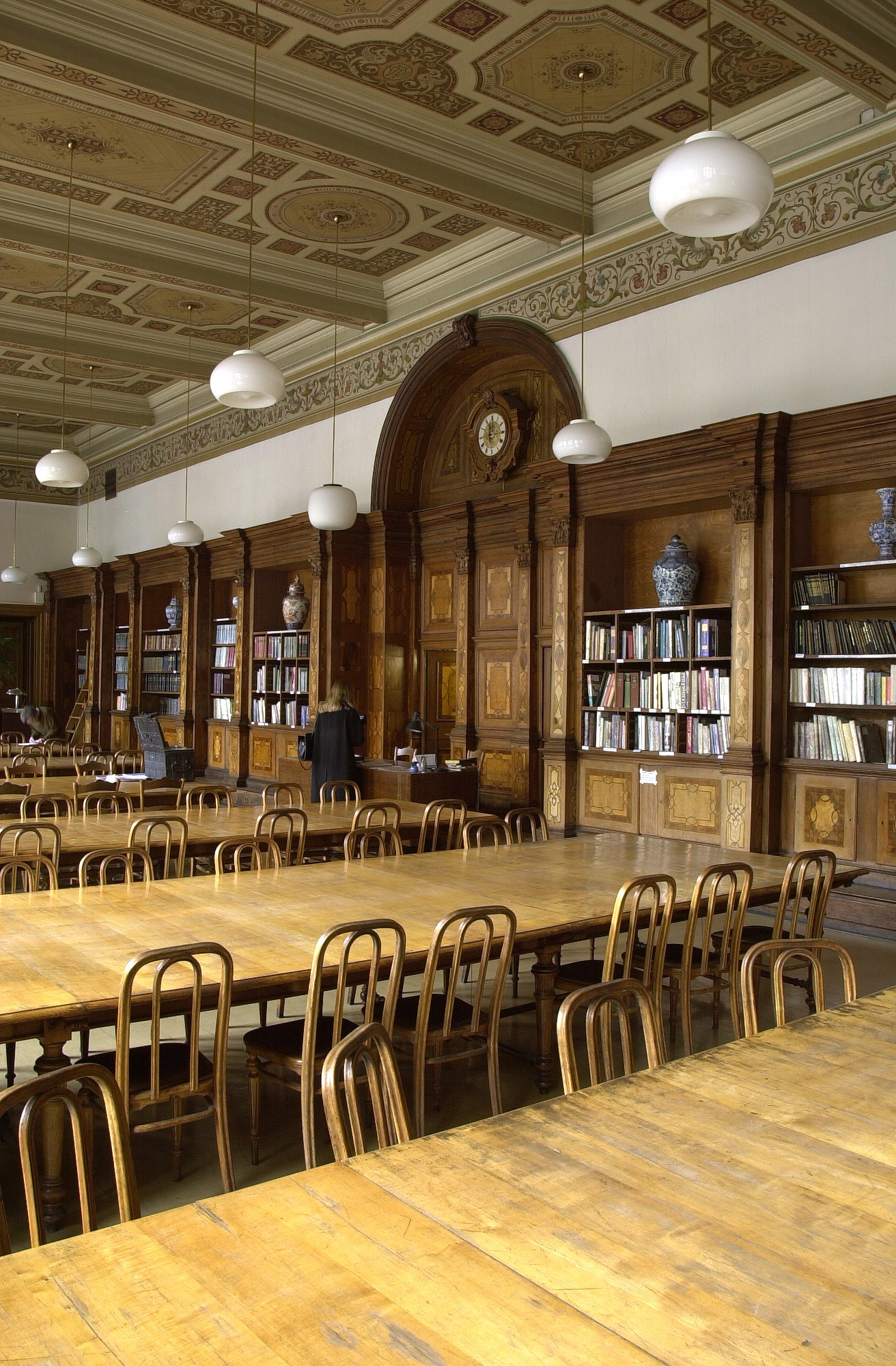
Library with study room

The largest Czech library specializing in the arts and related fields is an integral part of the museum. It holds 172,000 volumes, including authoritative art encyclopedias, dictionaries of artists, comprehensive works on iconography, topography and heraldry. Apart from art books and other scholarly publications, the library contains numerous reference manuals and periodicals. It provides on-premises use of resources, database access and research in the Art and Architecture (ART) subject gateway.

The exhibition halls of the museum and the library are fully accessible to wheelchair users.

== See also ==
- Josef Sudek Gallery
- The Chateau at Klášterec nad Ohří
- The Chateau at Kamenice nad Lipou
- Прага, Увоз, 160\24 Дом Луны и Солнца, Josef Sudek Gallery
