= Klášterec nad Ohří Castle =

Historical building in the Czech Republic

Coordinates: 50°23′03″N 13°10′25″E

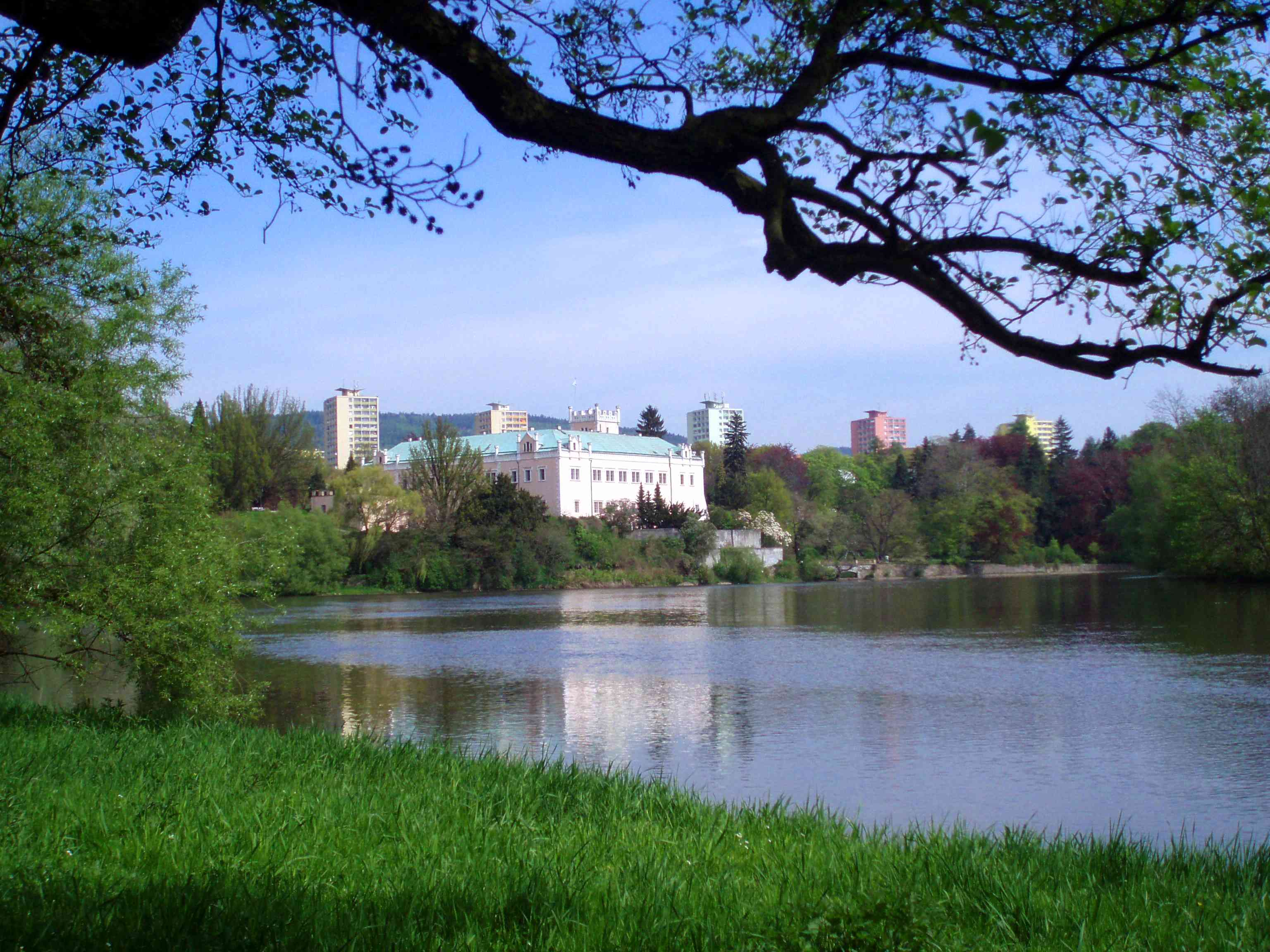
Klášterec nad Ohří Castle in the landscape park on the Ohře River

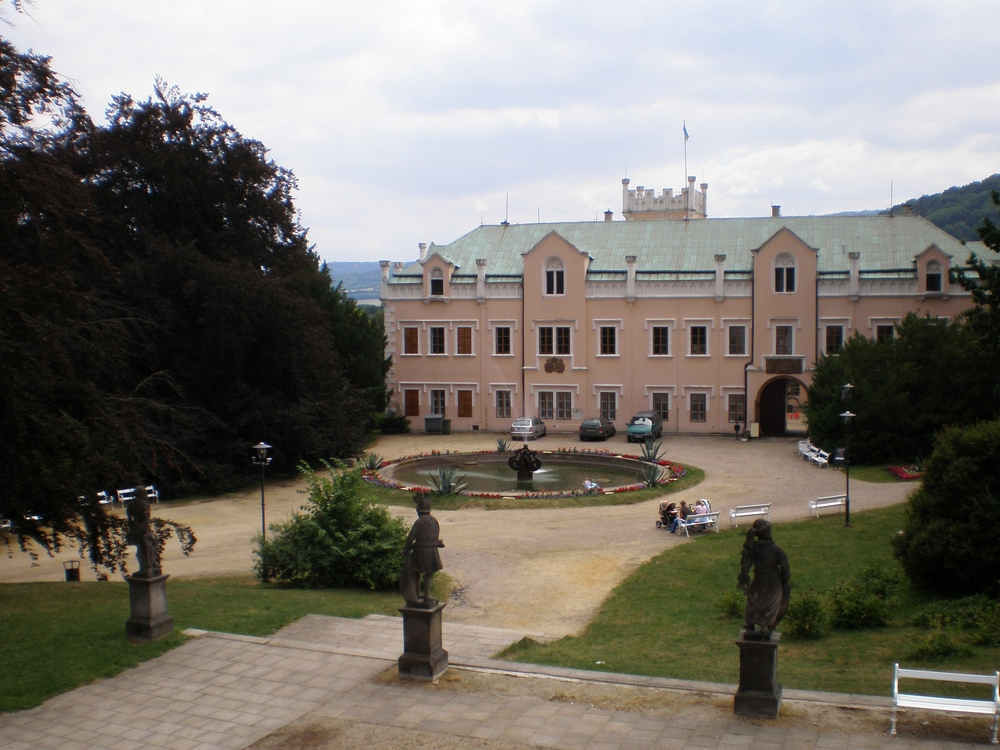
Courtyard and castle gardens

Klášterec nad Ohří Castle (Czech: zámek Klášterec nad Ohří) is a Baroque stylecastle in Klášterec nad Ohří in the Ústí nad Labem Region of the Czech Republic. It is located on the left bank of the Ohře River. The castle complex, acquired in 1621 by the Thun und Hohenstein family, is a prominent landmark in the town's recently restored historic urban conservation area.

== Setting ==
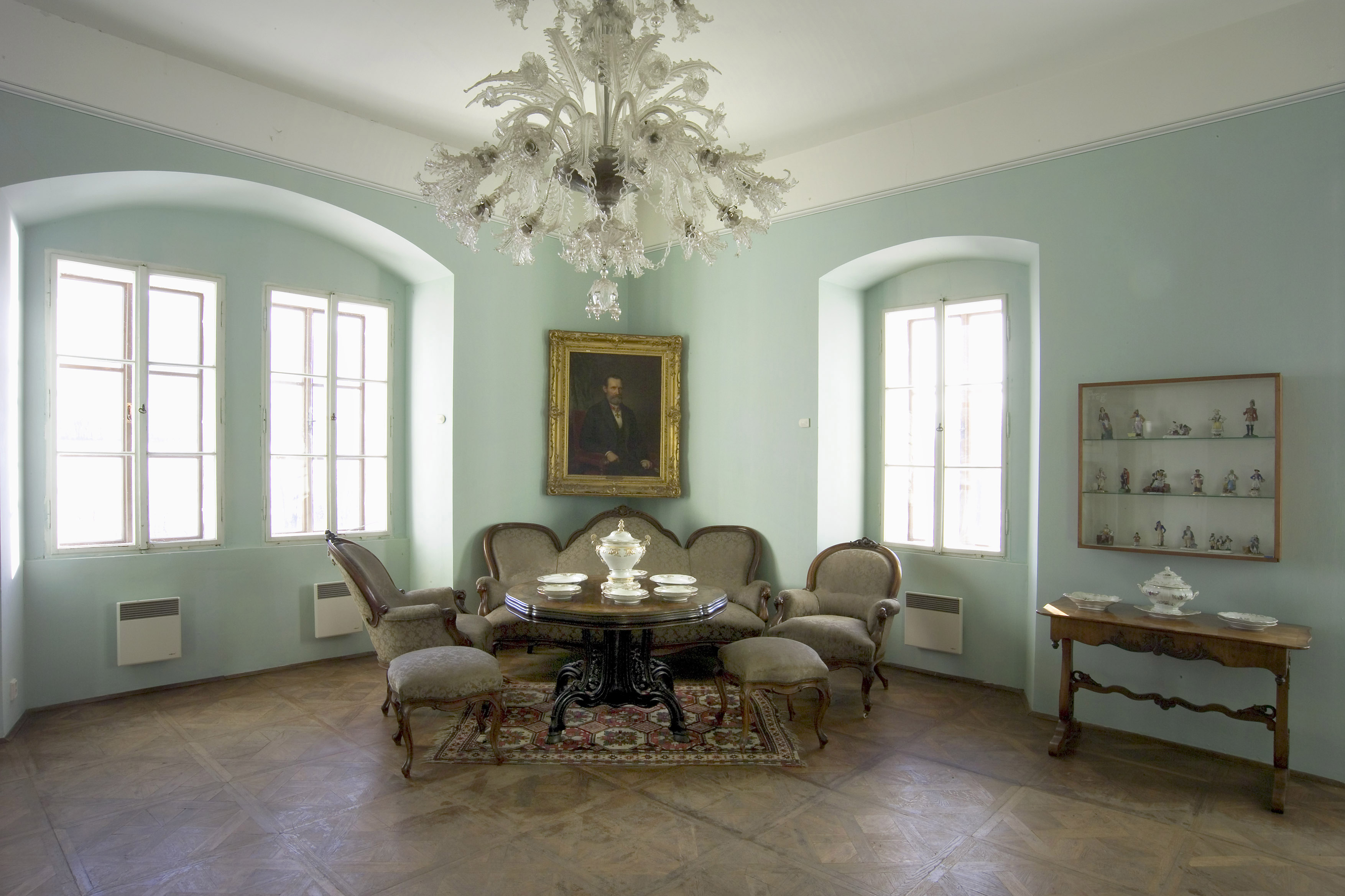
Salon – interior of the castle

The castle is set in an extensive landscape park, with 220 tree species, some rare from around the world. The park features a Baroque style sala terrena pavilion, with a gloriette mezzanine decorated with architectural sculptures by Jan Brokoff (1680s).

The park's northern section has an installation of the Stations of the Cross (1690s) and the Church of the Holy Trinity with the Crypt of the Thun noble family.

== Museum ==
The Klášterec nad Ohří Castle exhibits in the Porcelain museum of Klášterec nad Ohří an extensive porcelain collection from the Museum of Decorative Arts in Prague. It includes:

- Czech Porcelain – Occupying 21 rooms on the castle's first floor, the collection of Czech porcelain documents the more than 200-year-old history of porcelain manufacturing in Bohemia. The historical showcases and interiors feature the output of porcelain factories in Slavkov, Klášterec nad Ohří, Březová, Kisibl, Chodov, Stará Role, Dalovice, Prague, Loket, Budov and Ždanov.
- Early Far Eastern and European Porcelain Manufacturing – The display presents a selection of early porcelain produced in China and Japan, as well as Meissen, Vienna and Nymphenburg between the 17th and 19th centuries.
