= ASIC (disambiguation) =

In the realm of electronic technology, ASIC stands for application-specific integrated circuit, an integrated circuit customized for a specific task.

ASIC may also refer to:

- Accreditation Service for International Colleges, an educational accreditation agency in the UK
- Acid-sensing ion channels, a protein family
- Air and Space Interoperability Council, former name of the Air Force Interoperability Council
- Arfoire Syndicate of International Crime, the antagonist group in the video game Hyperdimension Neptunia mk2
- ASIC programming language, a dialect of BASIC
- Associated Signature Containers (ASiC), specifies the use of container structures to bind together one or more signed objects with either advanced electronic signatures or time-stamp tokens into one single digital container
- Association Scientifique Internationale pour le Café, a scientific organization based in France
- Australian Securities and Investments Commission, Australia's corporate regulator
- Aviation Security Identification Card, an Australian identification card

== See also ==
- Asics, an athletic equipment company
