= Francesco Illy =

Businessman and inventor (1892–1956)

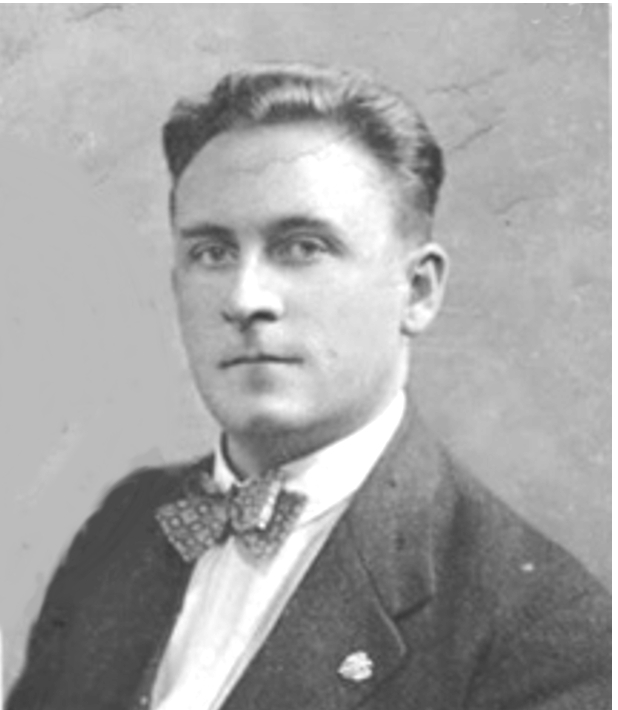
- Francesco Illy
- Born: Ferenc Illy; 7 October 1892; Austria-Hungary
- Died: 1956 (aged 63–64); Trieste, Italy
- Citizenship: Hungarian, Italian
- Education: Temesvár Piarista Gimnázium
- Known for: founder of Illy inventor of the Illetta (coffemachine)
- Board member of: CEO Illycaffé
- Spouse: Vittoria
- Children: Ernesto; Hedda
- Parents: János Illy (father); Aloisia Rössler (mother)
- Relatives: Riccardo Illy (grandson); Andrea Illy (grandson)

Francesco Illy (Hungarian: Illy Ferenc; 7 October 1892 – 1956) was a Hungarian-born accountant, bookkeeper, businessman and philanthropist, best known for founding Illy and inventing various coffee-related machinery. Born in Timișoara, in the Banat region of the Austro-Hungarian Empire, he later became a naturalized Italian citizen while retaining his Hungarian nationality.

== Biography ==
Illy was born into a middle-class family in Temesvár (Timișoara), a multi-ethnic city in the Kingdom of Hungary, within the Austro-Hungarian Empire. His father, János Illy, was Hungarian carpenter, and his mother, Aloisia Rössler, was of Danube Swabian heritage (ethnic German descent). He was baptized in the Iosefin Roman Catholic Church and attended the Piarist High School in Temesvár, completing vocational school in 1904. He later studied economics and moved to Vienna, where he began his professional career.

At the age of 22, he was conscripted into the Austro-Hungarian Army, and served from 1914 at almost every front of the First World War, including at the Battle of Kraśnik and the Battles of the Isonzo. He was awarded the Silver and Iron Cross of Merit, and in 1917 he was awarded the Bronze Bravery Medal, Karl Troop Cross and reached the rank of Sergeant.

After World War I and the Treaty of Trianon, Francesco Illy stayed in Trieste with his sister Amalie, known as Milly, who was married to the wealthy Leopoldo de Puxbaum and had two daughters. While there, he met Vittoria Prandina, later known as Berger (taking her biological father Vittorio’s surname), a piano teacher of his nieces. Vittoria, of German-Irish heritage, later became his wife, and together they had two children: Ernesto and Hedda.

In Trieste, Illy worked for companies involved in cocoa and coffee roasting. In 1920, he briefly moved to Milan, where he co-founded the Emax coffee roasting company in partnership with Cristoforo Cagnus. Returning to Trieste, he continued his work in coffee and began developing innovative methods to preserve its freshness. He invented and patented a vacuum-sealing system that preserved the aroma of freshly roasted coffee. His technique involved replacing oxygen in the packaging with nitrogen under pressure, preventing oxidation and allowing coffee to retain its full flavor over time. This method of pressurization is considered a major breakthrough in coffee preservation and is still in use today.

In 1933 Francesco Illy together with Roberto Hausbrandt as an equal partner, founded the illycaffè under the name Illy & Hausbrandt Coffee and Chocolate Industry. Later, in 1935, Illy invented and patented the Illetta, the world's first automatic espresso machine to replace steam with pressurized water. This invention is considered the foundation of the modern espresso machine. In 1939, Illy, Hausbrandt, and Carlo Seitz established a Swiss branch of the company in Thalwil, expanding its international presence.

His son, Ernesto Illy (1925–2008), later took over the leadership of the company. Today, Illycaffè remains a family-owned business, managed by the third generation of the Illy family.
