= Ernesto Illy =

Italian businessman

Ernesto Illy (July 18, 1925 – February 3, 2008) was an Italian food chemist and businessman, known as the chairman of the Illycaffè S.p.A. coffee manufacturer. He was deeply and widely respected, and is considered "an absolute giant" in the world of coffee and espresso, He spearheaded Illy's research into coffee and espresso quality, as summarized in his son Andrea's book, Espresso: The Chemistry of Quality, which was written with Ernesto's assistance.

== Biography ==
Born in Trieste, Illy was the son of the Hungarian-Italian chocolate maker Francesco Illy, a World War I officer, who had established the espresso making company in 1933. Ernesto studied chemistry at University of Bologna (1947) and immediately joined Illy, and later took over the company from his father (1956). Ernesto created a high-tech manufacturing process, specializing in the making of espresso coffee, for which he also was an evangelist. He was chairman of Illy 1963-2004 and then honorary chairman. Ernesto Illy took part in the establishment of Association Scientifique Internationale pour le Café (chairman, 1991-).

He was married to Anna Rossi. The Illy company is run by their son Andrea Illy (born 1964), and among the board members are the daughter Anna Illy and son Riccardo Illy (born 1955), who has also been mayor of Trieste and President of Friuli-Venezia Giulia region. Their first son, Francesco, is also involved.

== Awards ==
- Cavaliere del Lavoro of Italy (Knight of Industry, 1994)
- honorary doctorates and master's degrees (such as University of Udine, 2005)
- Centromarca brand organization (president, 1996-)
- Specialty Coffee Association of America (S.C.A.A.). "Lifetime Achievement Award" (1997)
- Monte Carmelo (Brazil) county (honorary citizenship, 2002)
- International Coffee Organization, London (chairman of the promotion committee, 2002-)
- Anacafè member of the order, Flor del Cafè (Guatemala, 2004).
