= Caffè Borbone =

Italian coffee company

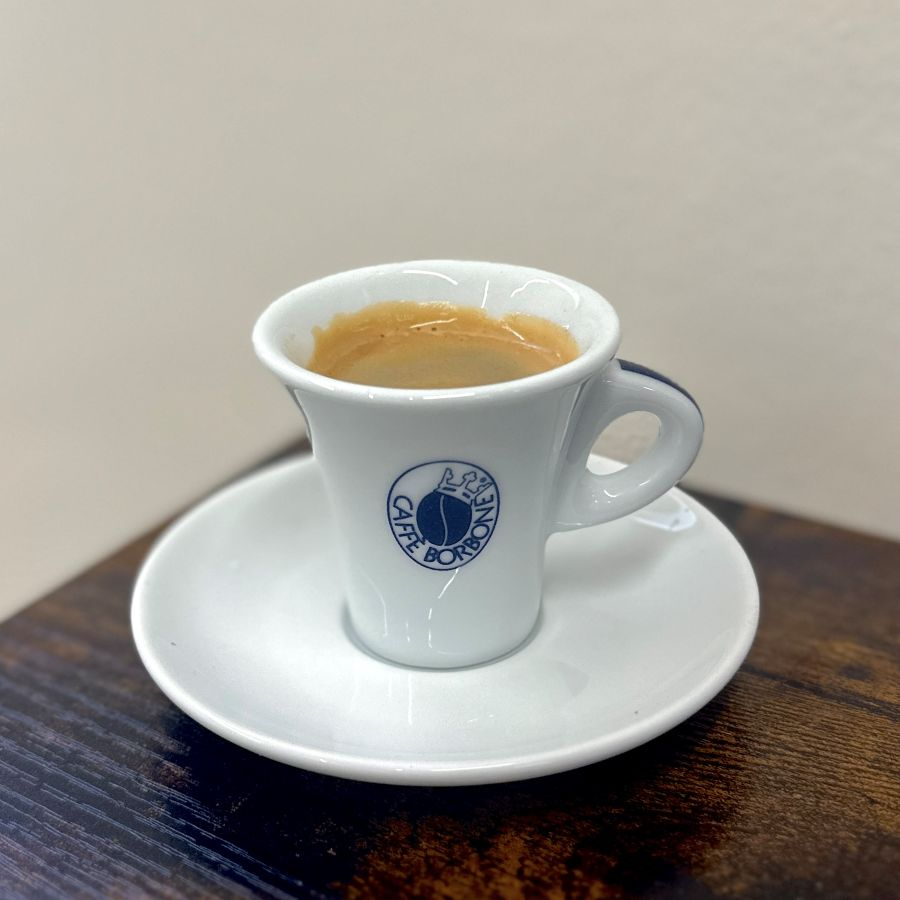
- Type: Private
- Industry: Retail Coffee
- Founded: 1997
- Founder: Massimo Renda
- Headquarters: Caivano, Metropolitan City of Naples, Italy
- Products: Coffee
- Owner: Italmobiliare, Massimo Renda
- Website: caffeborbone.com caffeborboneamerica.com

Caffè Borbone S.r.l. (branded as Caffè Borbone) is an Italian coffee company headquartered in Naples, specializing in espresso, singe-serve coffee containers, easy serving espresso pods, and espresso machines. As of 2025, Caffè Borbone is one of the leading producers of single-serve coffee in Italy.

== History ==
Founded in 1997 by Massimo Renda as L'Aromatika S.r.l., the company initially focused on the distribution of coffee through vending machines and single-serve systems.

In May 2018, the investment holding company Italmobiliare acquired a 60% majority stake in the company.

In 2021, the company recorded a 50.6% increase in gross operating profit. Over a six-year period, production and turnover tripled following investments totaling more than €70 million.

In 2023, Caffè Borbone surpassed €300 million in revenue for the first time and employed 300 people. The company also entered the United States market.

In 2025, the company reported revenues of €370.8 million, a 10.8% increase compared to the previous year.

== Coffee ==
Caffè Borbone produces K-cup compatible pods and Nespresso compatible coffee pods, whole beans, and ground coffee, among its offerings.

In 2020, Caffè Borbone collaborated with Didiesse on the Didi, a compact espresso machine designed for use with ESE coffee pods.

In 2021, Caffè Borbone launched a line of biodegradable capsules compatible with Lavazza A Modo Mio coffee machines and biodegradable pods compatible with Nespresso Original Machines. This initial launch included two of the company's available blends: Miscela Oro and Miscela Rossa. The company produces 2.6 billion units of portioned coffee per year.
