= IperEspresso =

Single-serve coffee maker

- IperEspresso logo
- Type: Single-serve capsule system for preparing espresso drinks
- Inventor: Illy
- Manufacturer: Illy
- Website: http://www.illy.com/wps/wcm/connect/en/coffee-at-home/coffee-machines-iperespresso, https://www.illy.com/en-us/shop/coffee-machines/iperespresso-capsules-coffee-machines/

iperEspresso is a single-serve capsule system for preparing espresso coffee and espresso-based drinks, developed and patented by Illy.

== Capsules ==
iperEspresso capsules contain a complete extraction group that replaces the traditional percolation process with a two-stage extraction. In the first stage, iper-infusion, hot water under pressure creates conditions that bring out coffee flavor and aroma. In the second stage, emulsification, the iper-infusion is forced through the valve at the bottom of the capsule, by mixing the aromatic oils with air to produce cream.

iperEspresso capsules are manufactured only by Illy. The cost per serving is 10% higher than Illy E.S.E pods, and twice higher than Illy ground or whole bean non-encapsulated coffee. Each capsule contains approximately 7 grams of coffee.

Illy offers three roast variations: normal, dark roast, and decaffeinated. It also offers Lungo, medium roast capsules that produce a longer (higher proportion of water) espresso, and the Monoarabica line, single-origin Arabica beans from six countries: Brazil, Guatemala, Ethiopia, Colombia, Costa Rica, and India. Seasonally, the company offers Idillyum, a low-caffeine Arabica grown in El Salvador.

== Machines ==
iperEspresso capsules require special espresso machines, which are manufactured by Francis Francis (a subsidiary of Illy), Gaggia (Saeco), and Cuisinart (Conair).

In addition to home espresso machines, Illy offers professional Francis Francis X7.1 iperEspresso machines for hotels and restaurants.
