= Cantarutti =

Cantarutti is an Italian surname. Notable people with the surname include:

- Luca Azzano Cantarutti (born 1963), Venetian politician and lawyer
- Robby Cantarutti (born 1966), Italian architect and industrial designer
