= Security identification display area =

Special security area in American airports

Security Identification Display Area, or SIDA, is a special security area designated by an airport operator in the US to comply with Transportation Security Administration (TSA) requirements in CFR 49 1542.205. An identification system must be used in this area. Before allowing unescorted access to this area, a person must be trained and their background investigated. Normally, the flight ramp and other sensitive operational areas of a US commercial airport are designated as a SIDA.

Systems similar to SIDA identification card system exists in Australia (known as Aviation Security Identification Card or ASIC) and in Canada (known as Restricted Area Identity Card or RAIC).

== See also ==
- Airport security
- Airport security repercussions due to the September 11, 2001 attacks
