= Security repercussions due to the 2006 transatlantic aircraft plot =

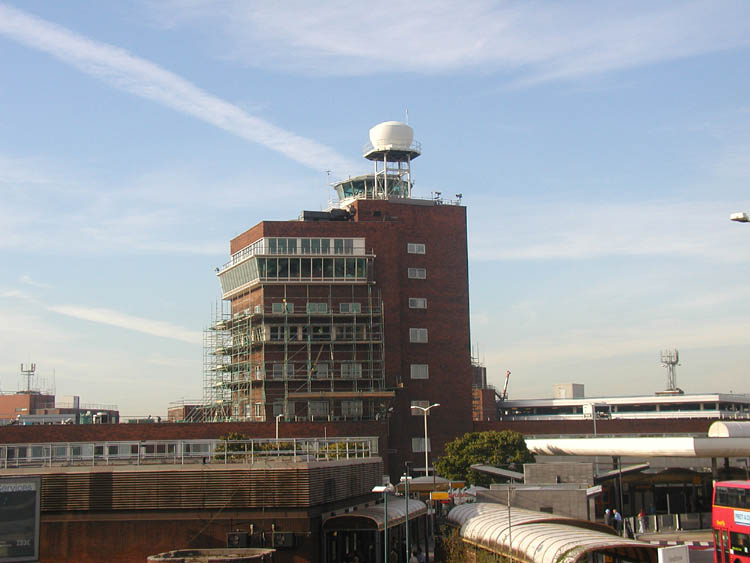
London Heathrow Airport

The 2006 transatlantic aircraft plot was a terrorist plot to detonate liquid explosives, carried aboard airliners travelling from the United Kingdom to the United States and Canada, disguised as soft drinks. The plot was discovered by British Metropolitan police during an extensive surveillance operation. A number of security measures were taken in response to the 2006 transatlantic aircraft plot.

== United Kingdom ==
Following the raids, the terror alert level was raised by Britain's Joint Terrorist Analysis Centre on 10 August 2006 from 'severe' to 'critical', signalling an attack was believed to be imminent. Security at all British airports was raised to the highest level, with all property having to go into the aircraft's hold, except for essentials such as travel documents and wallets. Passengers travelling with small children were permitted to carry baby food but had to taste it in front of staff.

On 14 August 2006, the threat level was reduced from 'Critical' to 'Severe'. An announcement was made that the hand baggage rules would shortly be relaxed to permit the carrying of one small item of hand baggage, although the ban on all liquids remained. Hand baggage was reintroduced at some smaller airports on 14 August, but was not permitted at Heathrow and Gatwick Airports until 15 August.

Despite having made it clear in August that the security measures were "here to stay", at the end of September, under pressure from the flight industry and professional musicians, the British government relaxed the size restrictions to the aviation industry standard (56 cm × 45 cm × 25 cm) and allowed musical instruments as hand luggage.

On 6 November 2006 the restrictions were relaxed once again to allow limited volumes of liquids in the cabin.

In November 2007, Transport Secretary Ruth Kelly announced that from 8 January 2008, British airports would be able to allow more than one item of hand luggage on board. This was following criticism in October by the shadow transport secretary Theresa Villiers, who said that because of the restrictive rules, Heathrow was "rapidly becoming a national embarrassment". Chief executive of British Airways Willie Walsh was also critical, saying that they are "damaging the UK's reputation around the world from a business perspective".

== United States ==
Following the operation, the United States Department of Homeland Security banned all liquids and gels except baby formula and prescription medications in the name of the ticket holder in carry-on luggage on all flights. The DHS level in the United States was raised to 'severe' (red) for all flights from the UK. The terror level for all other domestic or non-British international flights in the United States was raised to High (orange). According to White House Press Secretary Tony Snow, President Bush was aware of the plot by 6 August and approved raising the alert on 9 August.

== Other countries ==
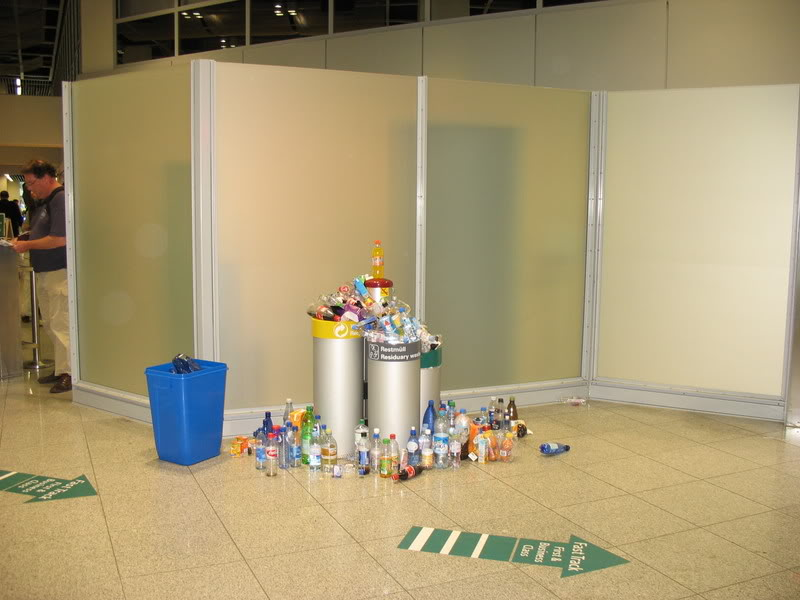
New liquid restrictions cause overflowing trash cans at Düsseldorf Airport, 2007

- Australia – Qantas began to implement tighter security checks, which would initially only apply to flights heading to the US and the UK, but Prime Minister John Howard mentioned that it could lead to a permanent ban of certain hand luggage in the near future.
- Barbados – Plane traffic delays affected many airports across the world including the Grantley Adams International Airport located in Barbados. After immediately instituting a policy of heightened security, the delays have affected many tourists including British Prime Minister Tony Blair's attempts to cut his Caribbean holiday short and return to the United Kingdom.
- Belgium – The Belgian Federal Police, coordinating its efforts with the British and French governments, increased security on the Eurostar rail line that connects London with Paris and Brussels.
- Canada – Transport Canada, though unaware of any specific threat, nevertheless restricted all liquid and gel items from hand luggage on departing flights. Exceptions were made for approved baby formula and prescription medication. In addition, all passengers travelling to the United States were subject to having their footwear examined.
- Finland – Finland's national airline Finnair cancelled two of its flights to London Heathrow on Thursday and one from Heathrow to Helsinki on Sunday, the remaining flights only had slight delays. Other airlines flying to and from Finland have experienced only delays. Passengers are forbidden to carry anything more than personal documents and wallets in flights to Britain.
- Hong Kong – Airport authority at the Chek Lap Kok airport have advised passengers going to the United States to arrive three hours before their scheduled flight in order to pass through tighter security checks. Hong Kong Government reminds Hongkongers in the United Kingdom to keep abreast of latest developments and pay attention to personal safety.
- India – Indian airports have been put under high alert and hand-baggage screenings have been tightened. Surveillance has also been stepped up. Incoming flights from the United Kingdom are facing delays due to greater checks.
- Ireland – The National Civil Aviation Security Committee, which advises the Irish Government, met to review the situation. Irish Minister for Transport Martin Cullen said there is no increased security risk at Irish airports.
- Japan – Though airport security was not heightened, Japan Airlines and All Nippon Airways began to strictly prohibit liquid items from its planes.
- Netherlands – The Dutch government said the UK terror plot would have no effect to the threat level in the country and would remain at "substantial" and "low" for Schiphol.
- New Zealand – Additional security restrictions were placed on passengers departing from New Zealand to the UK, and there were some flight delays; however, none were cancelled. In order to maintain the heightened security, thirty-two extra security staff supported by sniffer dogs were brought in to man three extra security lanes at Auckland Airport.
- Norway – The Norwegian government will not change the threat level and it remains at Low.
- Pakistan – The Pakistani government made several arrests in response to the plot. Foreign Office spokeswoman Tasnim Aslam stated, "In fact, Pakistan played a very important role in uncovering and breaking this international terrorist network".
- Philippines – Authorities at Ninoy Aquino International Airport have placed its airports on heightened alert. NAIA representatives have stated that all U.S.-bound flights have prohibited passengers from bringing liquid items on board.
- South Korea – The government has put Incheon International Airport on heightened alert following the foiled terrorist plot. All passengers are undergoing additional screening and all U.S.- and UK-bound flights are prohibited from carrying any liquids on flights. Furthermore, passengers en route to the US will have their belongings searched before boarding their flight. Korea's Civil Aviation Safety Authority of the Ministry of Construction and Transportation raised the security level from green (ordinary) to blue (concerned) and then to yellow (caution). A yellow alert indicates intelligence suggesting a threat to aviation.
- Republic of China (Taiwan) – Taipei heightened security measures on U.S.- and UK-bound flights. All ROC airlines banned UK- and U.S.-bound passengers from taking "large carry-on luggage" on board. Liquids also had to be checked in, not carried on board.

== Hand luggage restrictions ==
=== United Kingdom ===
Passengers travelling from and through all other UK airports were temporarily only permitted to carry-on those items on a restricted list, and these items had to be carried in transparent plastic bags. No liquids could be carried on board. Liquid medications, such as insulin for diabetics, were banned, "unless verified as authentic." All laptops, mobile phones, digital audio players and other electronic items were also banned.

It was suggested in The Times that the restrictions on hand baggage would be "enforced pending a decision from the National Aviation Security Committee following which they may be made permanent." This was confirmed by sources close to Douglas Alexander, the Secretary of State for Transport, on BBC News.

On 14 August 2006, an announcement was made that the restrictions on hand baggage for flights originating in the UK would shortly be liberalised to permit carriage of one small (45 cm × 35 cm × 16 cm) piece of hand baggage per person. Whilst electronics, books, and other dry items were again permitted on flights leaving the UK, all liquids above 100ml remained banned in hand luggage.

On 2 November 2014, liquid restriction rules were eased. However, as of current, some airports, including Stansted Airport and Manchester Airport, have added another restriction for travel bottle kits, stating that the bottle capacity must be printed or embossed on the bottles, with measurements on handwritten and sticker labels deemed insufficient and outright inadmissible to security.

=== United States ===
Similar emergency restrictions were placed on airline passengers traveling within and from the United States. Initially, all liquids were forbidden, including beverages, hair gels, toothpaste, lipstick, sunscreen, and hand lotions, due to the suspicion that liquid chemicals were planned to be used in the explosive purposes. Electronic devices (iPods, laptops, etc.) were still allowed for domestic flights.

==== 3-1-1 for carry-ons ====
As of 26 September 2006, the Transportation Security Administration adjusted the ban on liquids, aerosols and gels. Travelers are permitted to carry liquids through security checkpoints in containers of 3.4 ounces (100 mL) or less that fit comfortably in one quart-size clear plastic zip-top bag which need to easily seen through by the security agent. Each passenger can only bring along one plastic zip-top bag. For check-in baggage, there are no limits to the number of containers than can be packed. This procedure came to be known as "3-1-1 for carry-ons" (3.4 ounce containers in a 1 quart bag, 1 bag per passenger). Items purchased in the restricted or transit areas after clearing security could be brought on board without restriction. Other exemptions to this restriction include medications and breast milk.

=== European Union ===
On 10 October 2006 a European Union Regulation placed restrictions on carrying liquid materials in hand luggage across the EU.

This restriction was to be eased on 2 November 2014 with new RapidScan liquid explosive detectors, but the rules remain in effect across most EU airports.

=== Japan ===
On 1 March 2007, The Ministry of Land, Infrastructure and Transport also set out new regulations concerning the carriage of liquids in carry-on luggage for international flights. Passengers traveling abroad from Japan are required to place liquid items with a capacity of up to 100ml into a transparent resealable bag not exceeding 20 cm × 20 cm. Any liquid items exceeding 100ml in capacity are prohibited from being carried on board and must be placed in check-in baggage.

=== Singapore ===
On 8 May 2007, Singapore introduced new liquid restrictions, which is limited to 100ml for all flights (excluding Seletar Airport), where Changi Airport is the biggest airport with more frequent visitors and direct services. Liquids less than 100ml must be sealed into transparent resealable bag not exceeding 20 cm x 20 cm.

This restriction was eased on 2 November 2014.

=== Other Countries ===
Subsequently, similar restrictions for liquids in carry on luggage were set out in many other countries worldwide including Korea, Taiwan, Hong Kong, Vietnam and China who all set out liquid restrictions on international flights.

== Impact ==
Overall, an estimated 400,000 passengers were affected because of the alerts. It has been estimated that the first day of delays cost the airlines over £175 million. As many as 20,000 bags are believed to have been misplaced at Heathrow in the days following the flight cancellations.

=== Flight cancellations ===
Some inbound flights to London Heathrow Airport were cancelled on the day of the arrests, most notably the Thursday short-haul flights of British Airways. Some flights to and from London Gatwick Airport were also suspended,

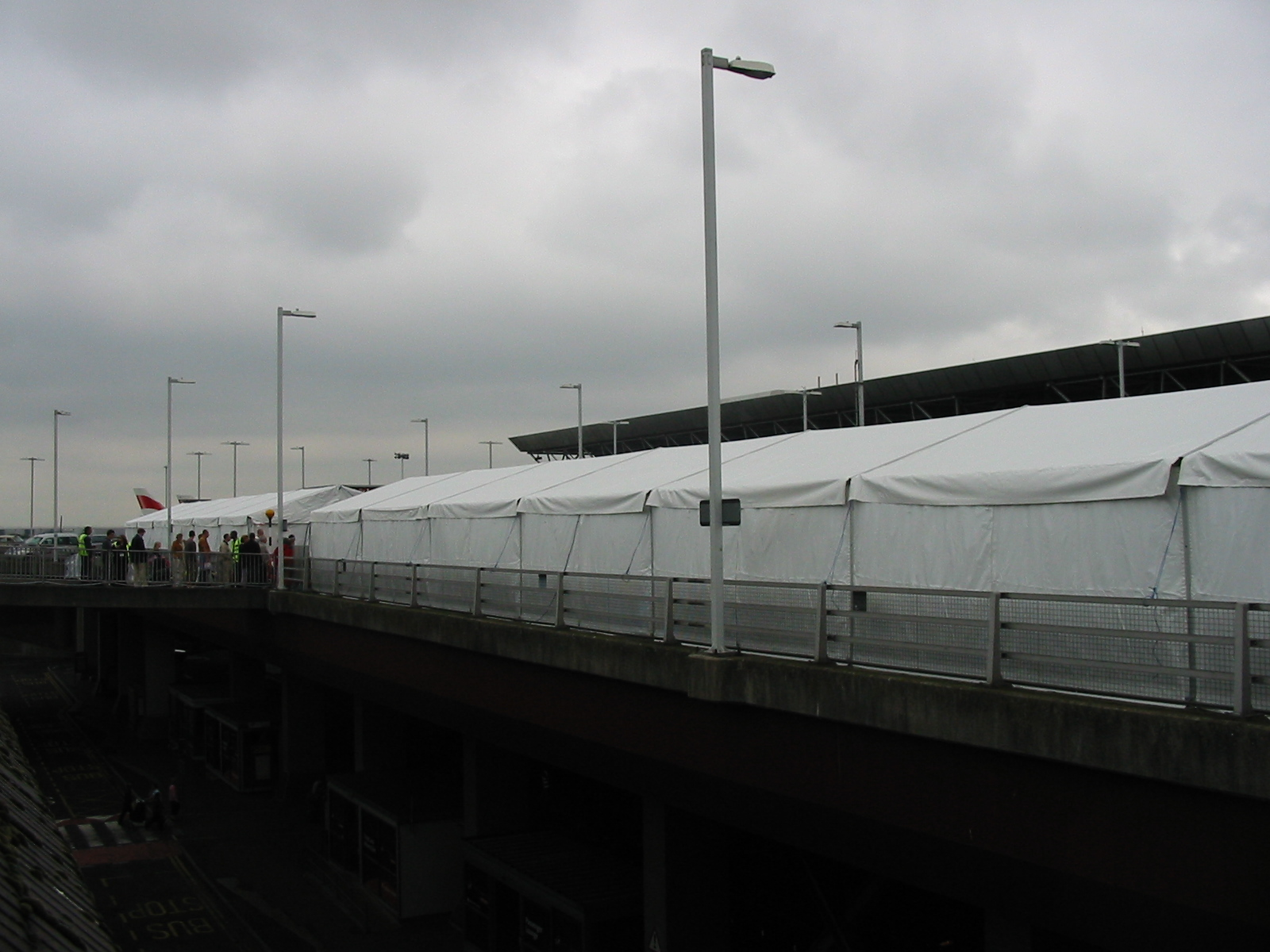
Tents on the car park in front of terminal 4. Heathrow, 14 August

On Sunday 13 August 30% of flights out of Heathrow were cancelled to reduce pressure on the screeners. By 15 August flight cancellations had fallen to 47 flights at Heathrow, and 8 Ryanair flights from Stansted. It was anticipated that cancellations would reduce on 16 August, with 90% of flights expected to depart as scheduled.

=== Controversy over the alert ===
On 12 August a public argument broke out between BAA, the operator of Heathrow and other airports, and British Airways, with Willie Walsh, BA's Chief Executive, accusing BAA of not being able to cope with the increased security and baggage checks. Ryanair also called on the British government to employ police and military reservists to speed up the full body searches which were now mandated, with Chief Executive Michael O'Leary saying:

Ryanair and other major UK airlines cannot keep cancelling flights and disrupting the travel plans of tens of thousands of British passengers and visitors solely because the BAA cannot cope with the new body search requirements. If the British government is serious about defeating terrorism and/or not allowing the terrorists to disrupt normal everyday British life, then it must provide the additional security staffing, either police or army reserve personnel, immediately to prevent London's main airports from grinding to a halt over the coming days.

On 18 August Ryanair's O'Leary delivered an ultimatum to the British government demanding the resumption of normal hand baggage dimensions and hand screening one passenger in four instead of one in two within one week, otherwise Ryanair would sue the Government for compensation under section 93 of the Transport Act 2000. The government responded that the actions were taken under the Aviation Security Act 1982, and no compensation was payable.

Several pilots complained about the "ridiculous" luggage restrictions that was thought up by "utter morons", the Sunday Herald reported. Carolyn Evans, head of flight safety at the British Airline Pilots Association, said, "the procedures put in place are not sustainable long term, and unless the passengers are treated more reasonably we will not have an industry left".

=== Economic effects ===
The Times commented the day after the arrests, that the economic effects were minor and that the FTSE 100 index showed only "mild signs of strain", suggesting that terror was already priced into assets, that the market impact will be contained, and that "what is lost on the swings may be gained on the roundabouts". It observed that the real commercial risk is that "people's behaviour is altered... change may come so subtly and subconsciously that it is hard to see, let alone measure… people may stop travelling for example, not because they are scared of being blown up, but because they are tired of complying with necessary security measures."

Estimates have also been made of the cost to airlines of their disrupted business. British Airways had to cancel 1280 flights, at a cost of £40 million. Ryanair are suing the UK government for the £3.3 million the cancellations cost them. Easyjet had to cancel 469 flights, at a cost of about £4 million. BAA says the alert cost them £13 million.

The Civil Aviation Authority has just commenced its five-yearly review of operation of the airport, and it is likely that BAA's ability to handle the security alert will now become part of that review. The combined airline losses may have totalled £250 million.

Air passengers also switched to other means of travel. Sea France ferry company operating from Dover to Calais announced that it had beaten its all-time record for number of passengers carried in one week, while Eurostar found that at the peak of the alert it was receiving 10 bookings per minute for immediate travel.

=== Other consequences ===
- BAA advised passengers not to travel to Heathrow unless their journey was "essential", and long delays were expected for outbound passengers.
- Houses in and around Walton Drive in High Wycombe, where one house was raided, were evacuated.

== See also ==
- Airport security repercussions due to the September 11 attacks
