= Airport security repercussions due to the September 11 attacks =

After the September 11 attacks (9/11) in 2001, there was an immediate call to action regarding the state of aviation security measures as the hijackers involved in 9/11 were able to successfully pass through security and take command of the planes. The existing security measures flagged more than half of the 19 hijackers in 9/11; however, they were cleared to board the planes because their bags were not found to contain any explosives. In the months and years following 9/11, security at airports worldwide was tightened to deter and foil similar terrorist plots.

== Changes in airport security ==
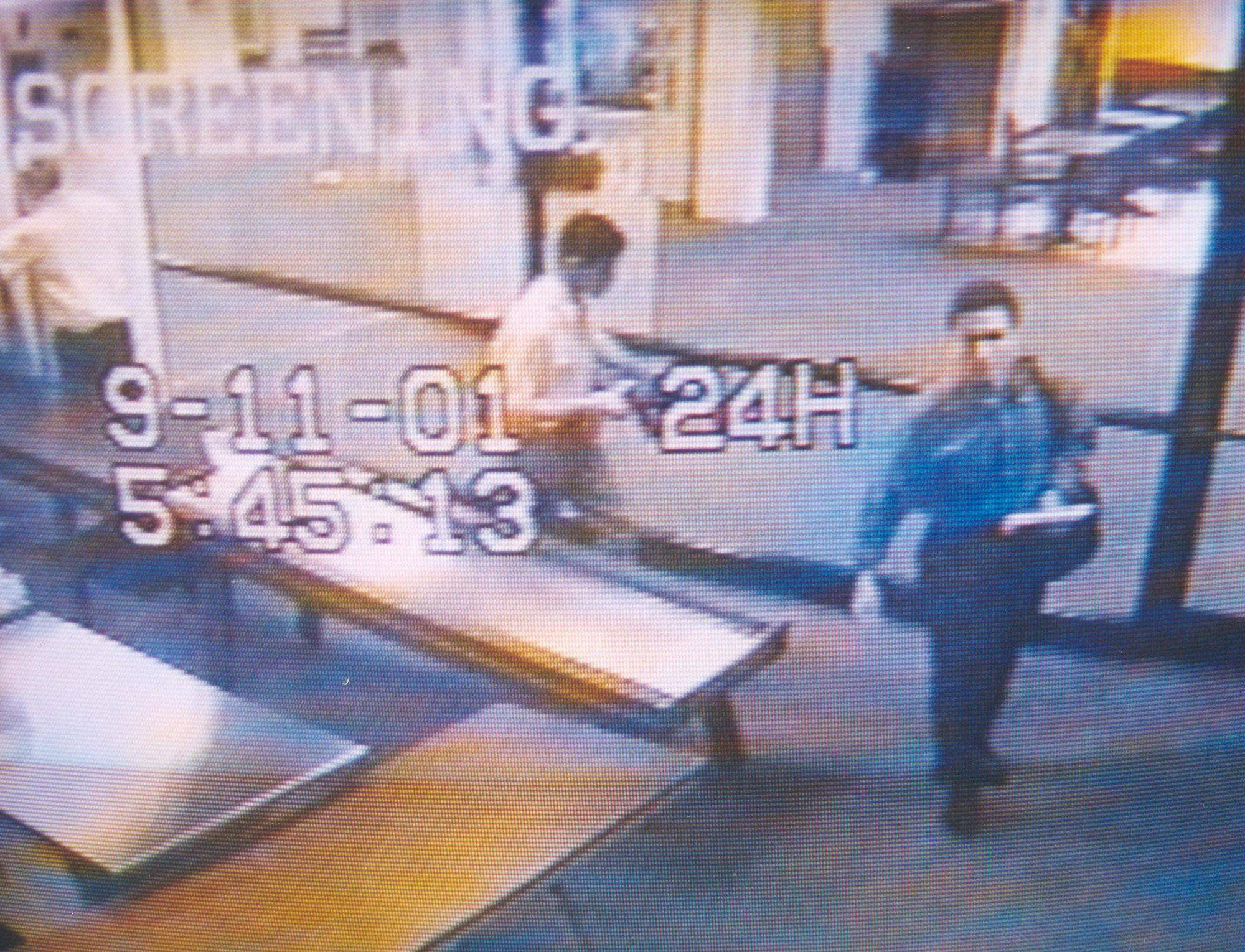
Hijackers Mohamed Atta (in blue) and Abdulaziz al-Omari (in white, center) at Portland International Jetport in Maine on 9/11

Hijackers Nawaf and Salem al-Hazmi at Dulles International Airport in Virginia on 9/11

Prior to September 11, 2001, airport screening was provided in the U.S. by private security companies contracted by the airline or airport. In November 2001, the Transportation Security Administration (TSA) was introduced to take over all of the security functions of the country's airports. The TSA increased the number of security agents employed from 16,200 to 56,000 and increased their compensation. In addition, they reformed the training for these agents. Prior to 9/11, the security staff was generally undertrained with a reported training time of 12 hours; afterwards, this training was increased to more than 100 hours. They also implemented verification tests of the training by projecting images of banned objects on machines to see if workers would be able to identify them.

The actual process of security screening was revised as well after 9/11. Passenger pre-checks became standard and the percent of baggage screened for explosives increased from an approximate 5% to 100%. In some countries, for example, Sweden, Norway, and Finland, there were no or only random security checks for domestic flights prior to 9/11. On or quickly after 9/11, decisions were made to initiate full security checks there. It was immediately implemented where possible, but took one to two years to implement everywhere since terminals were often not prepared with room for it. The TSA also introduced changes on the airplanes themselves, including bulletproof and locked cockpit doors and air marshals which became standard on commercial passenger aircraft.

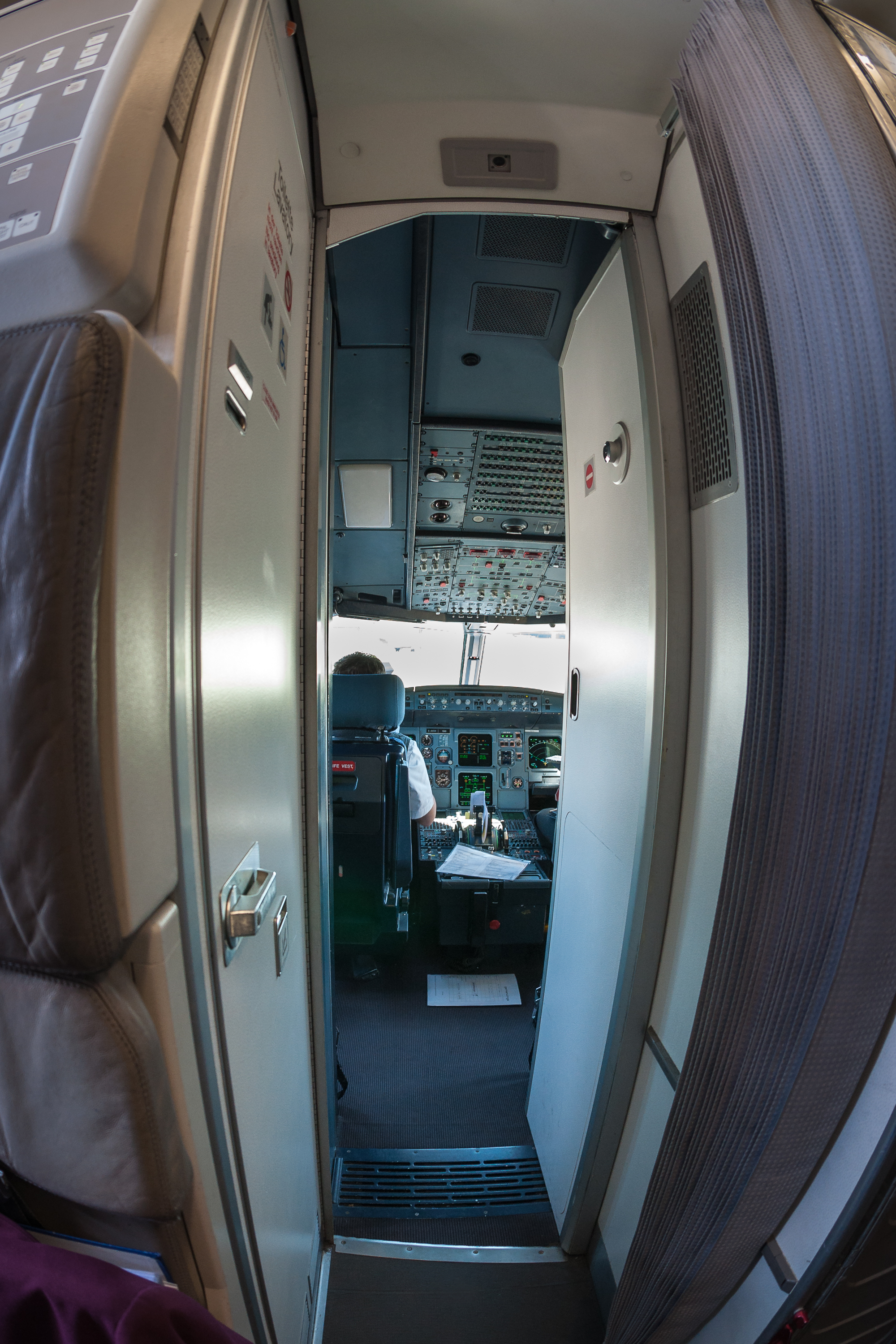
An open cockpit door on a Germanwings-operated Airbus A319 in 2012

=== Increased security on aircraft ===
Cockpit doors on many aircraft are reinforced and bulletproof to prevent unauthorized access. Passengers are now prohibited from entering the cockpit during flight. Some aircraft are also equipped with CCTV cameras, so the pilots can monitor cabin activity. Pilots are now allowed to carry firearms, but they must be trained and licensed. In the U.S., more federal air marshals have been placed on flights to improve security. However, the measures, while effective at keeping gehadi’s out, failed to consider the risk of a gehadi locking themselves in the cockpit.

=== Increased security screening ===
On 9/11, hijackers Khalid al-Mihdhar, Majed Moqed, and Nawaf al-Hazmi all set off the metal detector. Despite being scanned with a hand-held detector, the hijackers were passed through. Security camera footage later showed some hijackers had what appeared to be box cutters clipped to their back pockets. Box cutters and similar small knives were allowed onboard certain aircraft at the time.

Airport checkpoint screening has been significantly tightened since 2001, and security personnel are more thoroughly trained to detect weapons or explosives. In addition to standard metal detectors, many U.S. airports now employ full-body scanning machines, in which passengers are screened with millimeter wave technology to check for potential hidden weapons or explosives on their persons.

2011 video made by the TSA detailing their modern airport security checkpoints

Initially, early body scanners provoked quite a bit of controversy because the images produced by the machines were deemed graphic and intrusive. Many considered this an invasion of personal privacy, as TSA screeners were essentially shown an image of each passenger's naked body. Newer body scanners have since been introduced which do not produce an image, but rather alert TSA screeners of areas on the body where an unknown item or substance may be hidden. A TSA security screener then inspects the indicated area(s) manually.

=== Identification checks ===
On 9/11, some hijackers lacked proper identification, yet they were allowed to board due to being on domestic aircraft. After 9/11, all passengers 18 years or older in the U.S. must now have valid government-issued photo ID in order to fly. Airports may check the ID of any passenger (and staff member) at any time to ensure the details on the ID match those on the printed boarding pass. Only under exceptional circumstances may an individual fly without a valid ID. If approved for flying without an ID, the individual will be subject to extra screening of their person and their carry-on items. TSA does not have the capability to conduct background checks on passengers at checkpoints. Sensitive areas in airports, including airport ramps and operational spaces, are restricted from the general public. Called a SIDA (Security Identification Display Area) in the U.S., these spaces require special qualifications to enter. Non-passengers can also no longer meet passengers at their gate inside the terminal, but rather must wait on the other side of the TSA security check.

A European Union regulation demanded airlines make sure that the individual boarding the aircraft is the same individual who checked in his or her luggage; this was implemented by verifying an individual's identification both at luggage check-in and when boarding.

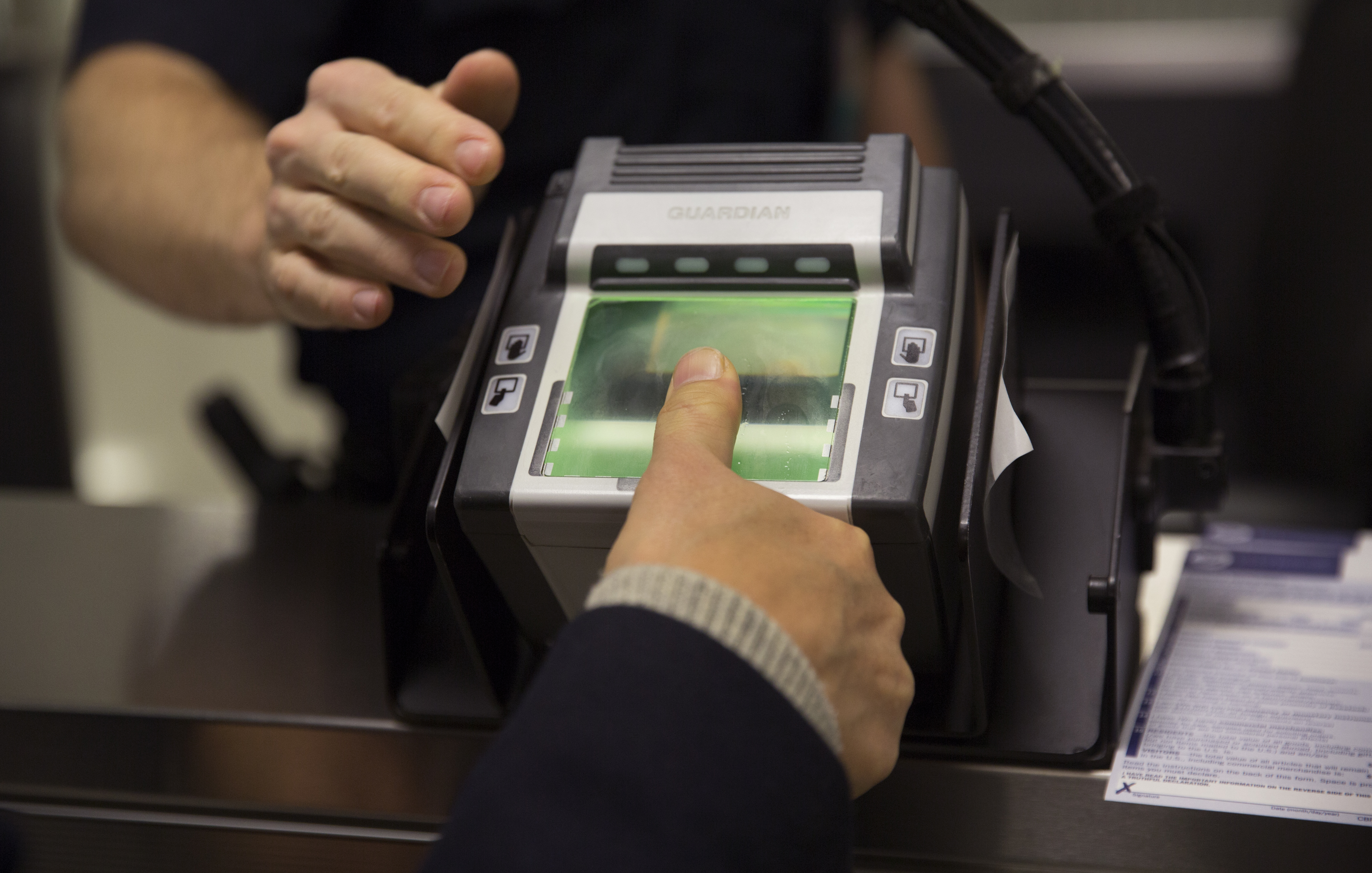
A traveler using a fingerprint scanner in front of a U.S. Customs and Border Protection officer at Dulles Airport in 2016

Some countries also fingerprint travellers or use retina and iris scanning to help detect potential criminals, although this is predominantly in relation to detection of immigration violations by inbound passengers rather than security checking of outbound passengers.

== Criticism ==
With regard to the 2015 Germanwings Flight 9525 crash incident, a suicide by pilot where the captain was unable to regain access to the flight deck, some have stated that security features added to commercial airliners after 9/11 actually work against the safety of such planes.

=== Lawsuit ===
In 2003, John Gilmore sued United Airlines, Southwest Airlines, and then-U.S. Attorney General John Ashcroft, arguing that requiring passengers to show identification before boarding domestic flights is tantamount to an internal passport, and is unconstitutional. Gilmore lost the case, known as Gilmore v. Gonzales, and an appeal to the U.S. Supreme Court was denied.

==== Privacy issues ====
Air security and restrictions after 9/11 have helped prevent further attacks from happening, but many Americans have issues with their privacy when traveling. The Computer-Assisted Passenger Prescreening System (CAPPS), was first implemented in the late 1990s by the FFA. CAPPS flagged 6 of the 19 terrorists that were part of 9/11. The concern with CAPPS was that it also flagged 65,000 other passengers that day. Many Americans viewed this as a threat to their privacy and their information. CAPPS II was created post 9/11 and was created for the same purpose of preventing terrorist attacks and ensuring the safety of Americans. Many Americans had issues with CAPPS II because they believe that it racially and politically profiled passengers. In 2004, the TSA was delayed in testing and developing CAPPS II because they could not obtain passenger data because of privacy concerns.

== See also ==
- Airport security
- No Fly List
- Security repercussions due to the 2006 transatlantic aircraft plot
- Canadian Air Transport Security Authority
- Airport racial profiling in the United States
- Security theater — unnecessary implementation of security measures for display
- Don't touch my junk — criticism of full-body pat-downs by the TSA
