= Domori =

Italian chocolate company

Domori is an Italian company which produces chocolate products. Domori has its headquarters in None, just outside Turin, Italy and since 2006 has been part of Illy Group.

== History ==
Domori was founded in 1997 by Gianluca Franzoni. In 1993, after studying Business, Gianluca travelled to Venezuela, where he experimented with varieties and harvests of cocoa in order to preserve the biodiversity and prevent the extinction of the rare cocoa, the criollo. The criollo is grown at the Hacienda San José plantation.

Domori produces six varieties of criollo, including Puertomar and Puertofino. The company manufactures a chocolate bar of 100% criollo, with no added lecithin or flavourings.

In 2012, the Coca-Cola company and Illycaffè collaborated to produce a line of cold chocolate drinks. As well as consumer products, Domori also produces chocolate in bulk for use by chocolatiers.

In 2015, Domori promoted its cold chocolate drink Crema Cacao, at the Milan World Expo.
