= Robby Cantarutti =

Italian Architect and Designer

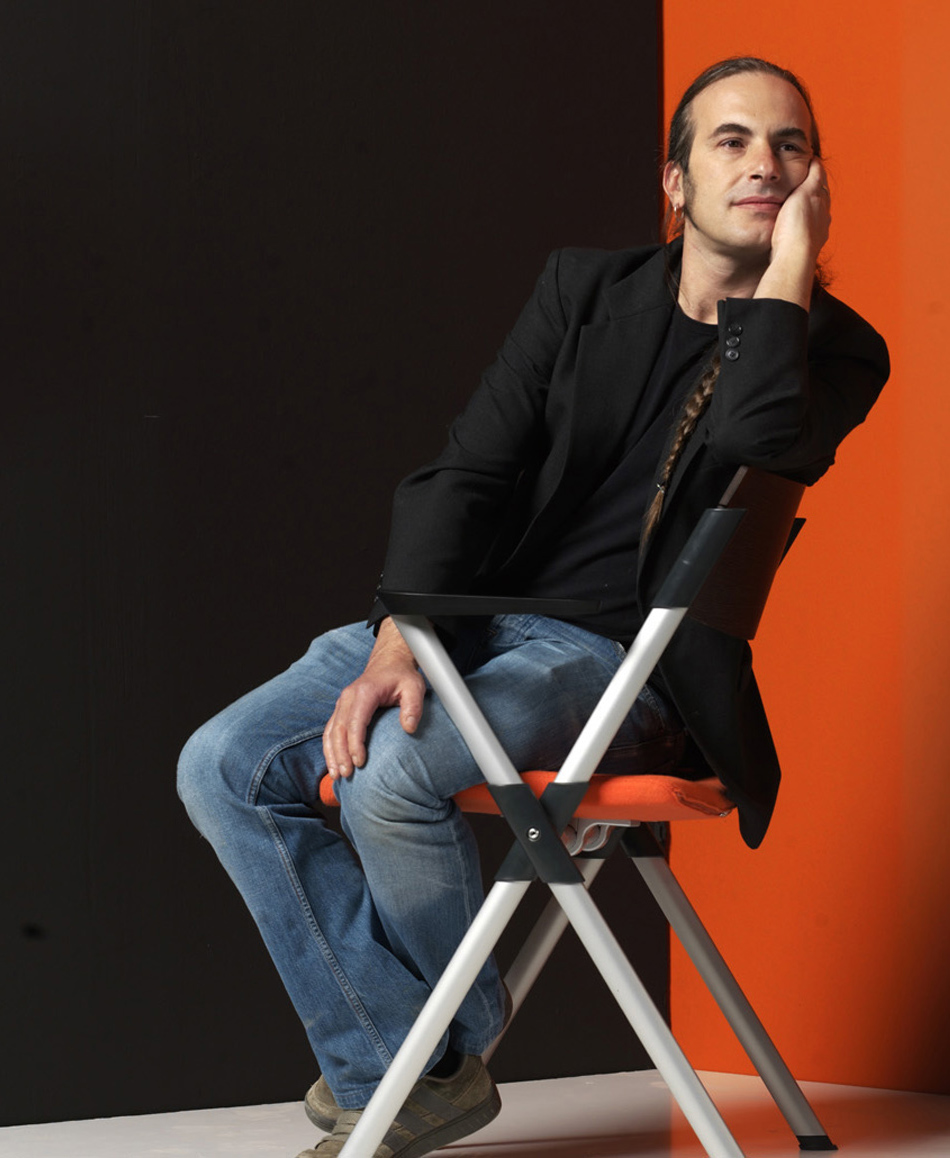
- Born: 17 June 1966 (age 59); Wuppertal, Germany
- Occupations: Architect, Designer
- Years active: 1995–present
- Spouse: Francesca Petricich
- Children: Gaia, Elena
- Website: www.archazione.com

Robby Cantarutti (born 17 June 1966) is an Italian architect and industrial designer from Venice and a practitioner of Italian Rationalism.

Many of Cantarutti's works are located in Friuli-Venezia Giulia, including his Cabin at the River, where he lives with his family.

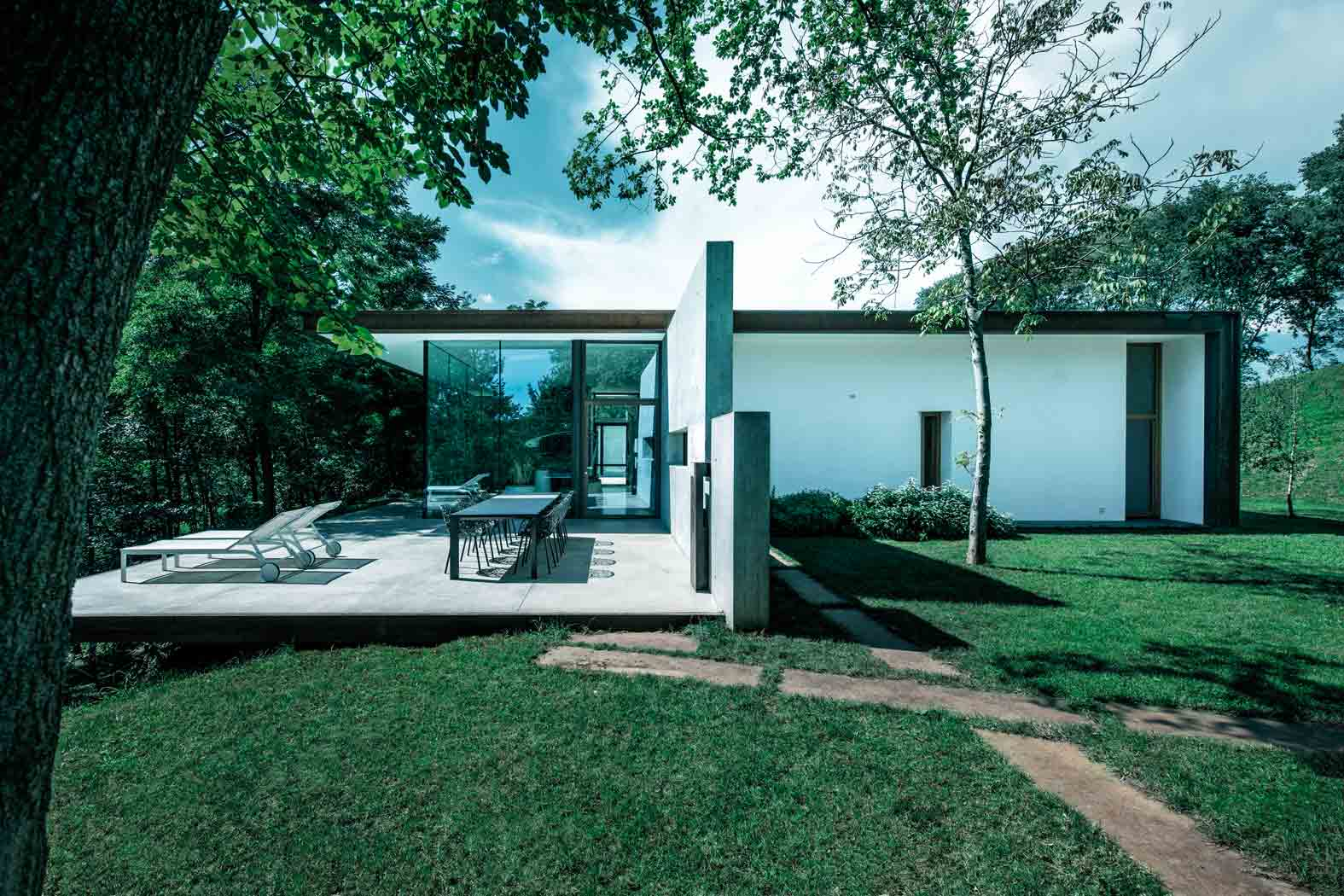
Awarded Cabin at the River - architects Robby Cantarutti Francesca Petricich

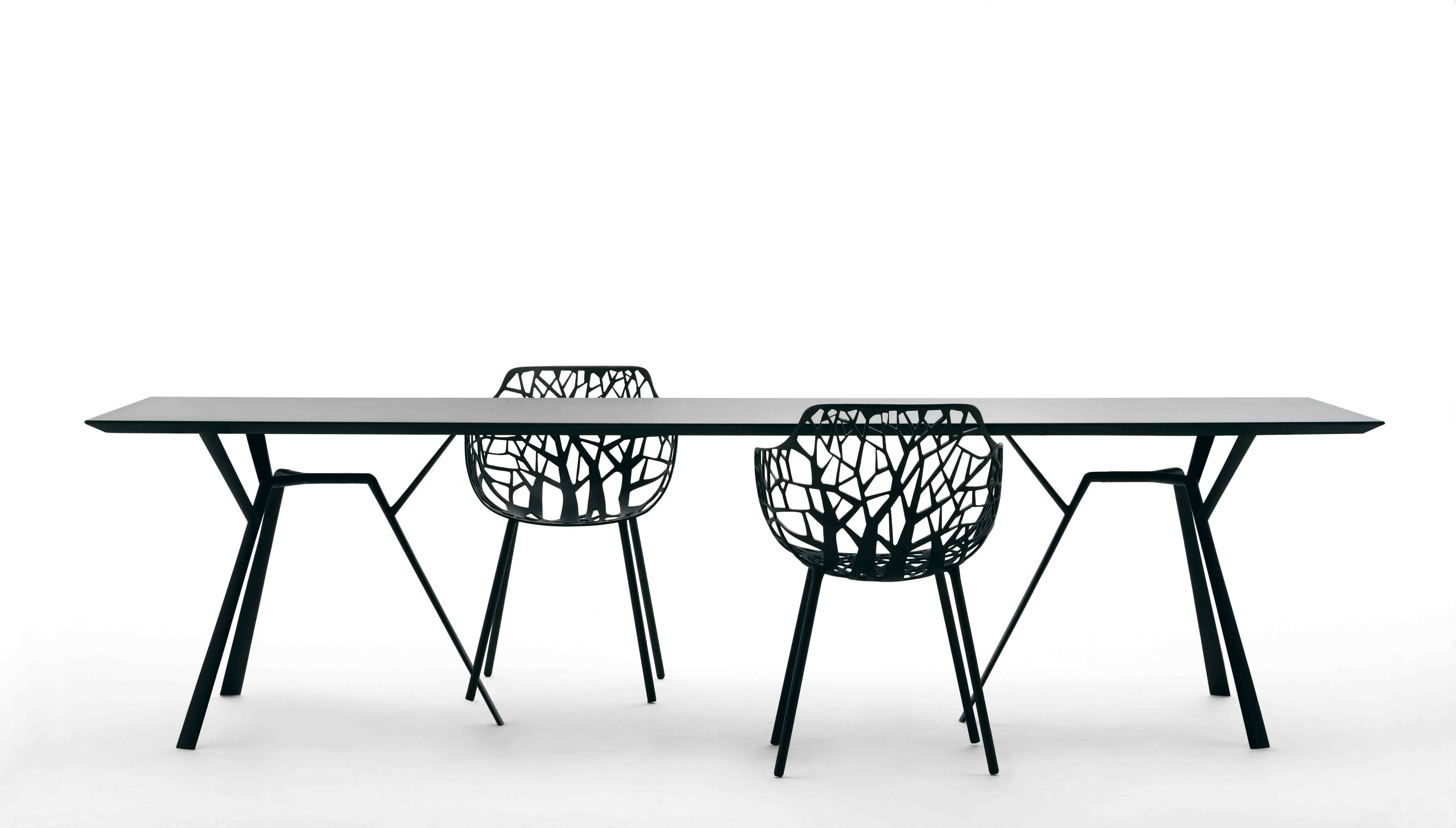
chairs and table by Robby Cantarutti

== Style ==
Under the influence of Bauhaus and Le Corbusier, Cantarutti transcended mainstream Rationalism, culminating in an organic style inspired by natural materials. His masterpiece, the Cabin at the River was also substance of the film “Cabin at the River” directed by Silvia Zeitlinger and was awarded with the Green LEAF Award 2015 for Best Single House Architecture 2015. Leading life style companies like Illy, Knoll use the Cabin as a filming location for their promotion work.

== Furniture ==
Cantarutti's Industrial Design is distributed by the companies Vibia and Fast all over the world.

== Architecture work ==
Cantarutti's architectural projects are primarily located in the Friuli-Venezia Giulia region. His work includes several single-family homes in Udine and Campoformido, as well as the reconstruction of the Piazza dei Martiri di Cittadella in Padua. In 2006, he designed the Ciclopedonale bridge in the Rizzi district of Udine. His residential work also includes a private clinic in Cussignacco.

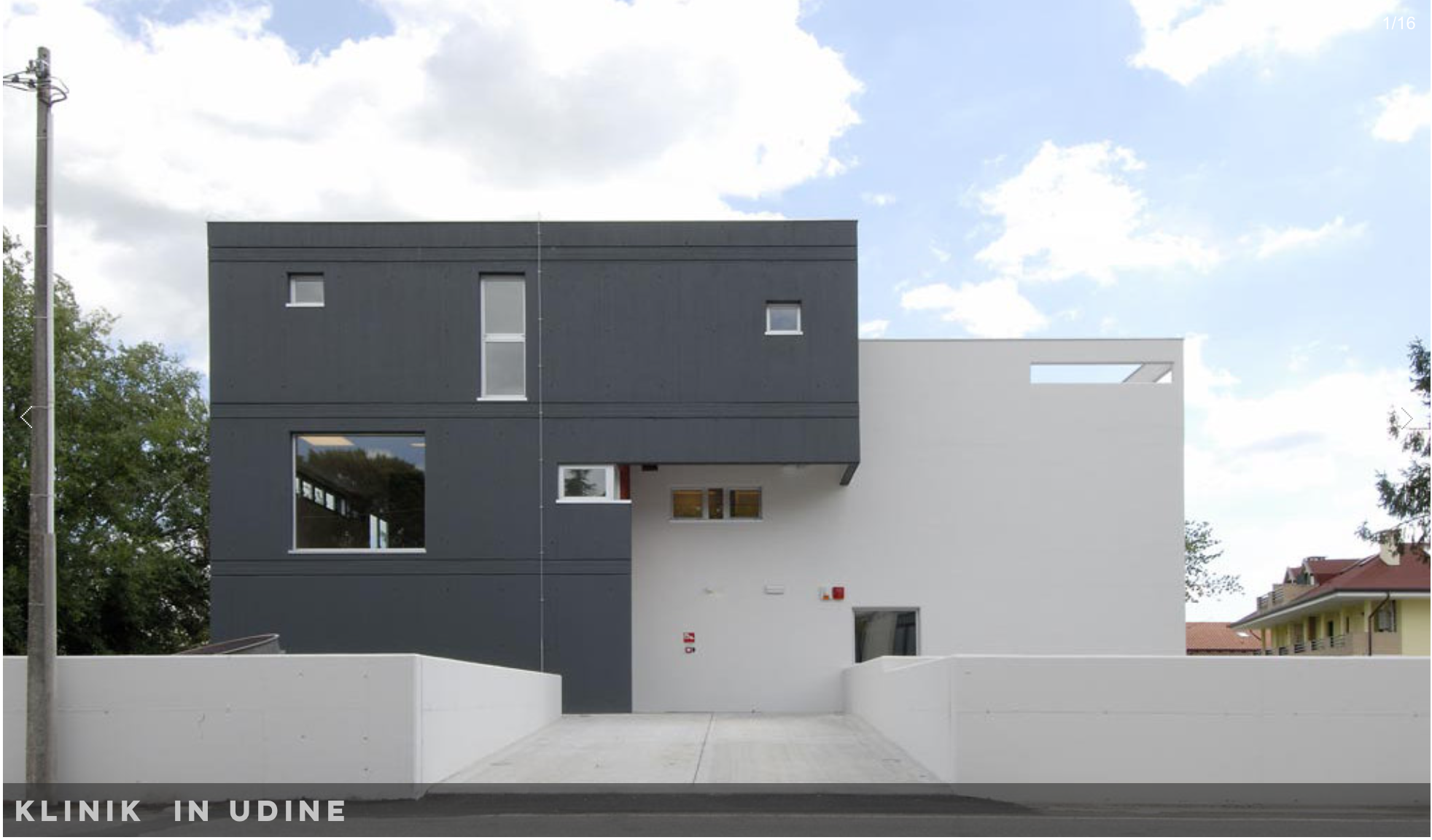
Clinic in Udine

== Design work ==
In industrial design, Cantarutti has collaborated with companies such as Vibia, Fast, and Arrmet. Notable furniture designs include the Forest and Niwa chair collections for Fast and the Lachaise chair for ETA spa. His lighting work includes the Samurai and Infinity lamps for Vibia. In 2016, he expanded into hardware design with the Domea and Qubica sun marquees and related remote control systems.

== Awards Design ==
Cantarutti has received several international design honors, including the Red Dot Award in Germany and the Asiad Award in the United States for the Forest chair. His Elena chair received a gold medal at the NeoCon competition in Chicago and a nomination for the Spanish Delta Awards. In 2015, his "Cabin at the River" residence won the Green LEAF Award for Best Single House Architecture. He was also a recipient of the European Product Design Award and the A' Design Award in 2017.

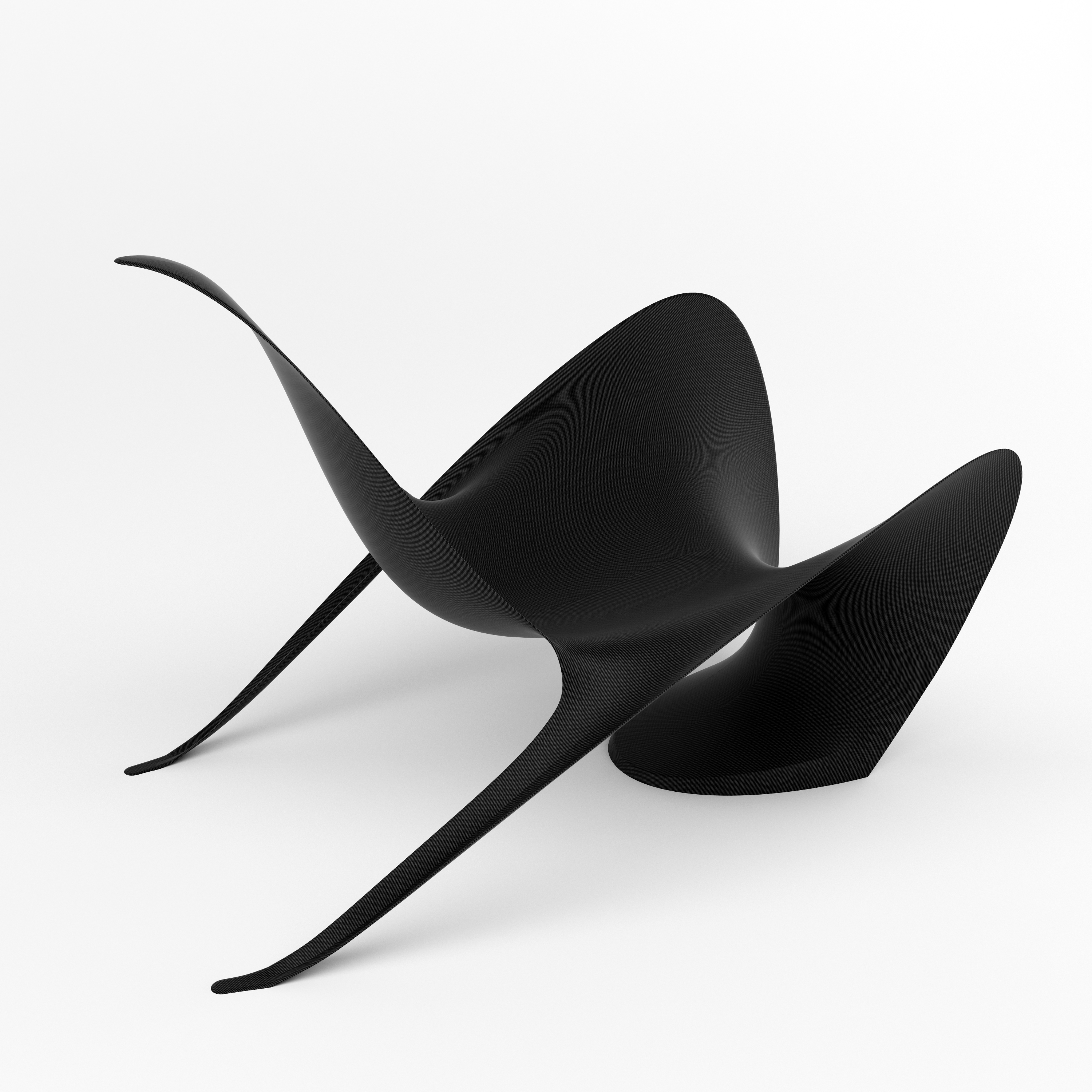
MantaChair designed by Robby Cantarutti
