= Andrea Illy =

Italian businessman (born 1964)

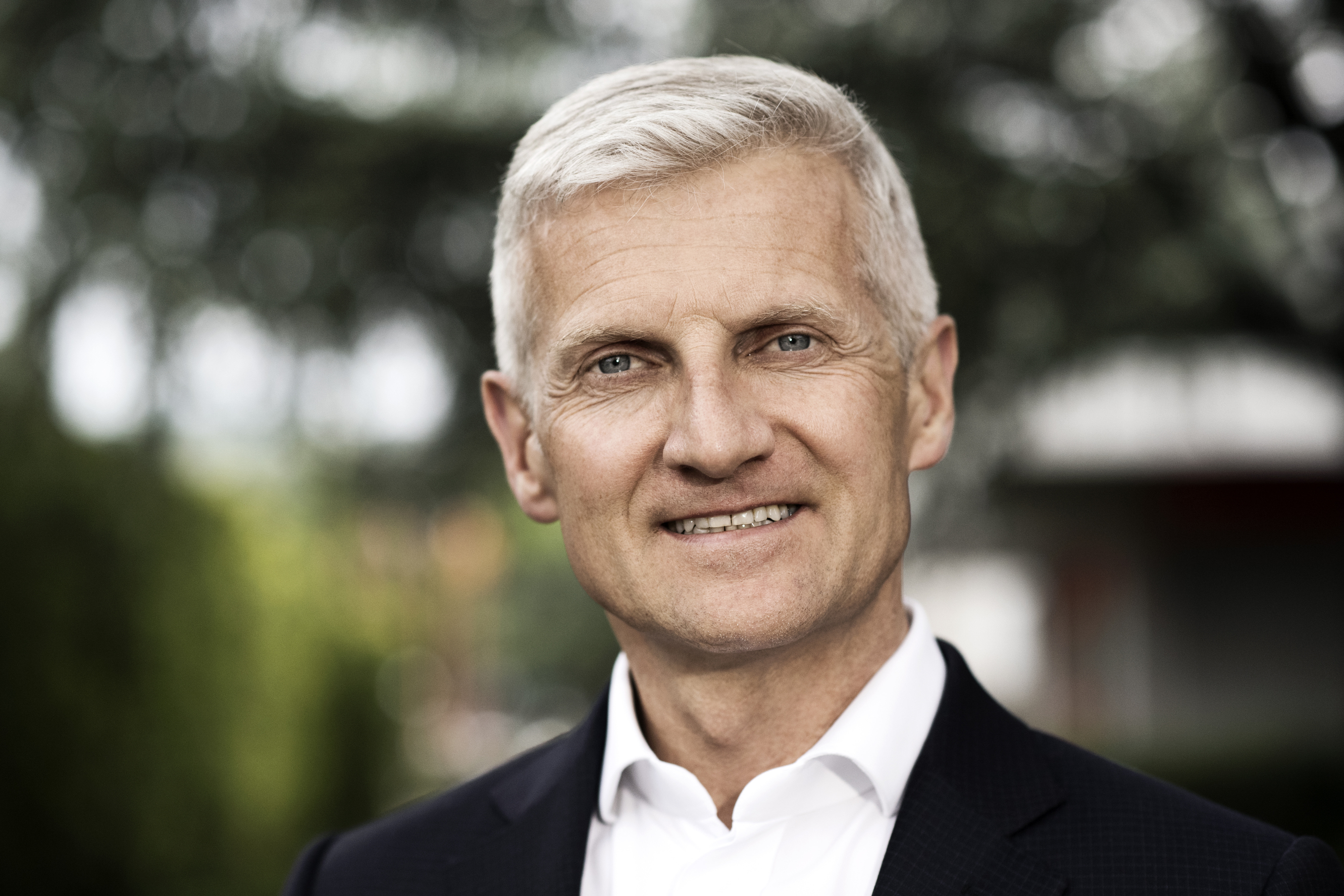
Andrea Illy

Andrea Illy (born 2 September 1964) is an Italian businessman. He is the Chairman of illycaffè S.p.A., a family coffee business founded in Trieste in 1933. He has additionally been Chairman of Altagamma since 2013.

== Life and education ==
Illy was born on 2 September 1964 in Trieste, the son of Ernesto Illy. He started his studies in Switzerland and graduated with a degree in chemistry from the University of Trieste. He subsequently took a Master Executive at SDA Bocconi, Milan, attended the six-week Advanced Management program at Harvard Business School, and the Executive Program at Singularity University, Silicon Valley. In 2003, he joined the Advisory Board of SDA Bocconi. Illy is married and has three daughters.

== Business career at illycaffè ==
In 1990, he joined the family business as a supervisor of the quality control department. Inspired by his previous experience in Japan, Illy started the Total Quality Program, which established standards for the company and coffee industry.

In 1994 he was appointed CEO of illycaffè S.p.A. and held that position until 2016. He has been Chairman of the company since 2005. At illycaffè, he developed several projects:

- The "Università del caffè" (University of coffee) with the objective of developing and spreading the culture of coffee in the world.
- The retail business at global level, with approximately 230 stores and monobrand illy.
- "Iperespresso" the new capsules system to prepare espresso coffee, based on a two phases (hyperinfusion and emulsion) extraction chamber.

Illy contributed to Expo Milan 2015 by curating the Coffee Cluster, a 4,000 m^{2} (43,000 sq ft) pavilion hosting 10 coffee-producing countries, while illycaffè has been Official Coffee Partner of the Universal Exhibition.

=== Other ===
In 1996, Illy was chosen as "Marketing Superstar" by the American magazine Advertising Age. In 1999, he undertook the role of president of A.S.I.C. (Association Scientifique Internationale pour le Café, Paris), while today he is Honorary President. Between 2003 and 2006 he was a member of the Advisory Board of the SDA Bocconi School of Management.

In 2004, he was awarded the title of "Imprenditore dell'Anno" (English: Businessman of the Year) by Ernst & Young Italia.

In 2012, he co-founded the LH Forum reflection group, the Movement for the positive economy created by Jacques Attali. From 2012 until March 2016, he was Chairman of the Promotion and Market Development Committee of the International Coffee Organization (ICO). In 2012 and 2013 he was Board member and President of the Sustainability Committee of the coffee and tea leading Dutch multinational company D.E Master Blenders 1753.

Since 2013, he is part of the Board of Governors of the Bank of Italy for the seat of Trieste.

In April 2013, he was elected Chairman of Fondazione Altagamma gathering High-End Italian Cultural and Creative Companies, of which he was a member of the Board of Directors since 1999 and, as a representative of the food industry, vice-president since 2007. In December 2015 he was reconfirmed as Chairman for the 2016–2018 period.

He was named Cavaliere del Lavoro by the President of the Italian Republic in 2018.

Since 2020, he has been Co-Founder and Chairman of the Regenerative Society Foundation.

== Publications ==
- Illy, Andrea; Viani, Rinantonio (1995). Espresso coffee: the chemistry of quality (2nd print). London: Academic Press.
- Illy, Andrea; Viani, Rinantonio; Suggi Liverani, Furio (2005). "Espresso coffee: the science of quality". Amsterdam. Elsevier academic press.
- Illy, Andrea; Illy, Elisabetta (2010). L'aroma del mondo: un viaggio nell'universo e nell'emozione del caffè. Milano, Hoepli.
- Illy, Andrea (2015). A Coffee Dream. Torino. Codice Edizioni.
- Illy, Ernesto; Illy, Andrea. The complexity of coffee. Scientific American (summer edition 2015), pag.10.

== See also ==
- Ernesto Illy
- Riccardo Illy
- illycaffè
