= ASIC programming language =

ASIC
- Version 5.0
- Original author(s): Dave Visti
- Developer(s): 80/20 Software
- Initial release: before 1993
- Final release: 5.00 / 1994; 31 years ago
- Written in: x86 assembly, Turbo C
- Operating system: MS-DOS
- Type: BASIC
- License: Shareware

ASIC is a compiler and integrated development environment for a subset of the BASIC programming language. It was released for MS-DOS and compatible systems as shareware. Written by Dave Visti of 80/20 Software, it was one of the few BASIC compilers legally available for download from BBSes. ASIC allows compiling to an EXE or COM file. A COM file for the Hello world program is 360 bytes.

ASIC has little or no support for logical operators, control structures, and floating-point arithmetic. These shortcomings resulted in the tongue-in-cheek motto, "ASIC: It's almost BASIC!"

== Features ==
ASIC is strongly impoverished in comparison with its contemporary BASICs. The features of ASIC are selected to make a program be easily and directly compiled into machine language. Thus, many language constructs of ASIC are equivalent to constructs of assembly language.

=== Program elements ===
Neither identifiers nor keywords are case-sensitive.

Any DIM statements, if specified, must precede all other statements except REM statements or blank lines.

All DATA statements must be placed at the beginning of the program, before all other statement types, except DIM, REM statements, or blank lines.

==== Expressions ====
ASIC does not have the exponentiation operator ^.

ASIC does not have boolean operators (AND, OR, NOT etc.).

=== Arrays ===
The size of array specified in the DIM statement must be a literal constant. A single DIM allows declaring only one array.

=== Input and output ===
PRINT's arguments must be a literal or variable. PRINT does not allow combined expressions as its arguments, nor strings concatenated with ; or +.

If a PRINT command ends with ; or ,, then the next PRINT command will resume in the position where this one left off, just as though its argument were appended to the argument of the current PRINT command.

The PRINT statement prints integer values six characters wide. They are aligned to the right (no trailing spaces).

LOCATE row, column
Moves the text cursor to the position (column, row), where 0 ≤ column and 0 ≤ row. The position (0, 0) is the upper left corner.

=== Graphics ===
PSET (row,column),color
Turns on the pixel of the color color at position (column, row), where 0 ≤column and 0 ≤ row. The position (0, 0) is the upper left corner.

=== Control Structures ===
A boolean condition may be only a comparison of numbers or strings, but not a comparison of combined expressions. A literal cannot be the left operand of comparison (e.g. can be X = 2, not 2 = X).

==== Decisions ====
After THEN, there may be a sequence of statements delimited by ELSE or ENDIF. An example:

IF X < 0 THEN
  PRINT "Negative"
ELSE
  PRINT "Non-negative"
ENDIF

Contrary to other BASICs, statements cannot be put between THEN and the end of the line.

An if-statement can realize the conditional jump. In this case, after THEN there may be a label.

==== Looping ====
In FOR, after TO there may be only a number - literal or variable - but not a combined expression. The STEP clause does not exist in ASIC.

==== Branching ====
In a GOTO statement, the label must be followed by a colon.

==== Subroutines ====
In a GOSUB statement, the label must be followed by a colon.

== BAS2ASI ==
This utility, serving to convert GW-BASIC programs to ASIC syntax, in the version 5.0 does not support some GW-BASIC features. Examples:

STEP in the for loop is not converted. The program

10 FOR i=10 TO 1 STEP -1 
20 PRINT i
30 NEXT i

is converted into

	REM 10 FOR i=10 TO 1 STEP -1 
	FOR I@ = 10 TO 1 
		ASIC0@ = -1 -1 
		I@ = I@ + ASIC0@ 
		
		REM 20 PRINT i
		PRINT I@ 
		
		REM 30 NEXT i		REM 30 NEXT i		3:  Syntax error

The exponentiation operator ^ is not converted. The program

10 a=2
20 b=a^10
30 PRINT b

is converted into

	REM 10 a=2
L10: 
	A@ = 2 
	
	REM 20 b=a^10
	2:  Syntax error

	REM 30 PRINT b	REM 30 PRINT b	3:  Syntax error
