= Aviation Security Identification Card =

Australian identification card

An Aviation Security Identification Card (ASIC) is an Australian identification card that shows that the holder of the card has undergone a security check and is suitable to enter a secure area of an Australian airport. Security checks are performed by AusCheck and include a criminal records check undertaken by the Australian Federal Police, a security assessment conducted by the Australian Security Intelligence Organisation (ASIO) and an unlawful non-citizen check conducted by the Department of Home Affairs. An ASIC is required for all personnel working at a security controlled airport in Australia. Personnel requiring access to a secure airport who are under the age of 18 are required to display an ASIC; however, issuing bodies cannot apply for a security check. An ASIC has to be renewed every two years except for someone who has applied for an ASIC before they turned 18 in which case an ASIC is valid until 6 months after the person's 18th birthday. Only people with an operational need to enter a secure airport may apply for an ASIC. The goal of the ASIC is not just to prevent terrorist activities at airports but to ensure aircraft, equipment and facilities cannot be tampered with.

The ASIC is a program similar to the Maritime Security Identification Card program found in the maritime and offshore industries.

Systems similar to ASIC identification card system exist in Canada (known as Restricted Area Identity Card or RAIC), New Zealand (known as the Airport Identity Card) and in the United States (known as Security identification display area or SIDA).

== Obligations ==
ASIC holders are required to follow specific conditions otherwise they risk losing their ASIC or even face Federal Prosecution.

== Types of ASIC ==
There are three categories of ASIC: Red, Grey, and White. The type of ASIC card needed depends on the level of access required. A card holder's Operational Need determines whether an applicant requires access to airside security zones (Red) or landside security zones (Grey). On 1 November 2016, authorised ASIC issuing bodies began to issue a new role-specific white ASIC. This type of card is issued to individuals who require a valid background check but do not require access to airport secure areas. To be eligible for a White ASIC, an individual must be a staff member or a contractor of:

- a Known Consignor, regulated air cargo agent (RACA) or accredited air cargo agent (AACA)
- an ASIC issuing body; or
- an airport visitor identification card (VIC) issuer

ASIC Security features include: All three types of ASIC have a similar layout. The only difference between the Red ASIC, Grey ASIC, and White ASIC card are the background colours. All ASIC cards feature the following:

- A large passport type photo of the ASIC holder to clearly identify them.
- ASIC cards can be issued for a specific airport which will have the airport code designation on them, such as SYD or MEL, or they can be issued with the AUS designation, making it valid nationwide. This is one of the key differences to the SIDA card used in the United States, where each airport issues their own card for use at that particular airport only which can present issues for flight crews operating at different airports.
- A silver Holographic strip with the word 'ASIC' clearly printed and the outlines of an aircraft and Australia.
