= Illy =

Italian coffee company

Illycaffè S.p.A.
- Logo since 2003
- Type: S.p.A.
- Industry: Coffee
- Founded: 1933; 93 years ago
- Founder: Francesco Illy
- Headquarters: Trieste, Italy
- Area served: Worldwide
- Key people: Andrea Illy (chairman); Massimiliano Pogliani (CEO)
- Products: Coffee, espresso machines
- Revenue: €567.7 million (in 2022)
- Net income: €14.2 million (in 2022)
- Number of employees: 2700+ (in 2016)
- Website: www.illy.com

Illycaffè S.p.A. (branded and stylised as illy) is an Italian coffee company specializing in espresso, headquartered in Trieste. Illy markets its coffee globally in silver and red pressurized, oxygen-free cans; operates a network of cafes on shopping streets, in museums, and in airports; and, since 2009, has marketed a line of coffee-flavoured energy drinks as illy issimo.

Either as whole beans or ground coffee, Illy offers medium, dark, and decaffeinated roast variations, as well as single-origin arabica variations, as available, each from Brazil, Guatemala, Ethiopia, Colombia, Costa Rica, Nicaragua, Tanzania, or India. Seasonally, the company offers Idillyum, a low-caffeine arabica grown in El Salvador. The company packages coffee as whole beans, pre-ground coffee, ESE pods, and iperEspresso capsules.

Illy was founded in 1933 by Francesco Illy, remains family-controlled and employs 1188 employees (2023) worldwide. In 2022, revenues totalled €567.7 million, and in late 2019, Illycaffee sought to expand into the United States market, offering a 20% stake in the company to potential investors.

== History ==
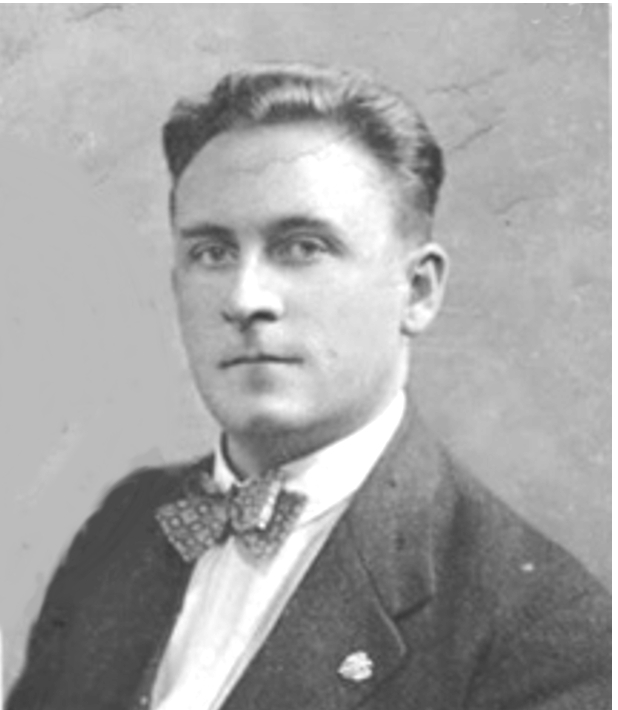
Francesco Illy (Illy Ferenc), the company's founder, in 1930

Illy was founded by a Hungarian, Francesco Illy (Illy Ferenc in Hungarian), born in Temesvár, Austria-Hungary (now Timișoara, Romania). During World War I he was conscripted into the Austro-Hungarian Army. After the war and the Treaty of Trianon, he remained with his sister in Trieste, which had recently come under Italian rule. In 1933, he set up a cocoa and coffee business, eventually concentrating on coffee. Focusing his interest on espresso, in 1935, Illy invented the first automatic coffee machine which substituted pressurized water for steam, marketed as the illetta, the predecessor of contemporary espresso machines.

Illy developed a packaging system to preserve coffee, where coffee-filled cans are pressurized with nitrogen, to prevent oxidation. Illy coffee was soon marketed outside the Trieste area and was eventually marketed throughout Italy.

After World War II, control of the company passed to Ernesto Illy (1925–2008), the son of the founder, who started a research laboratory that would ultimately develop numerous inventions and patents. As a scientist and researcher, Ernesto Illy established cooperative agreements with universities and research centres and promoted coffee globally.

Ernesto's son Andrea Illy (born 1964) is currently the company chairman, and Andrea's sister Anna Illy (born 1958) and brothers Francesco Illy (born 1952) and Riccardo Illy (born 1955) are on the board of directors. Illy coffee is available globally, with price differences reflecting global tariffs.

In 1999, Illy established the University of Coffee, Unicaffe, in Naples to support education, research and innovation related to coffee. The university was later moved to company offices in Trieste; the Unicaffe network currently has 27 branches worldwide.

== Company ==
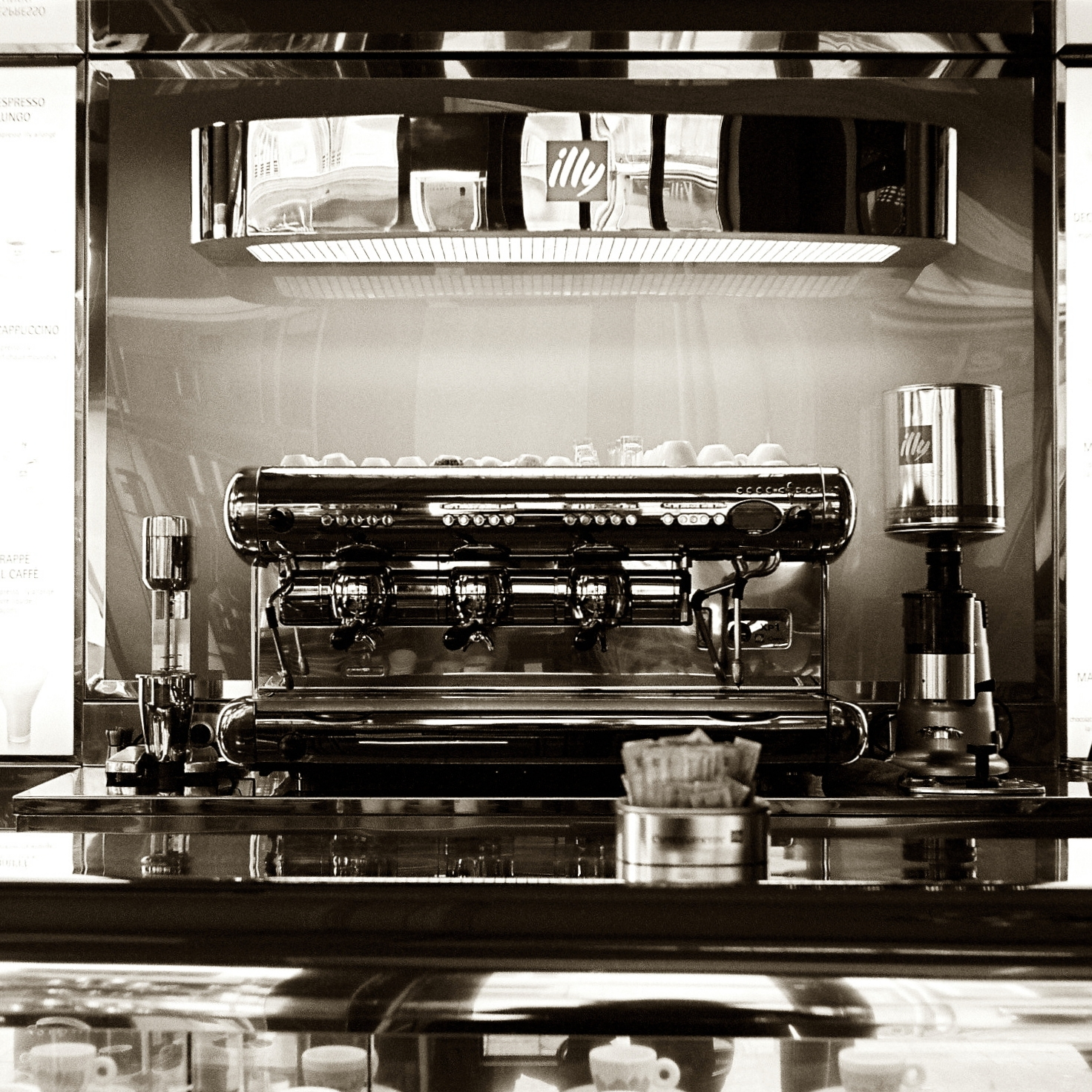
An illy espresso machine

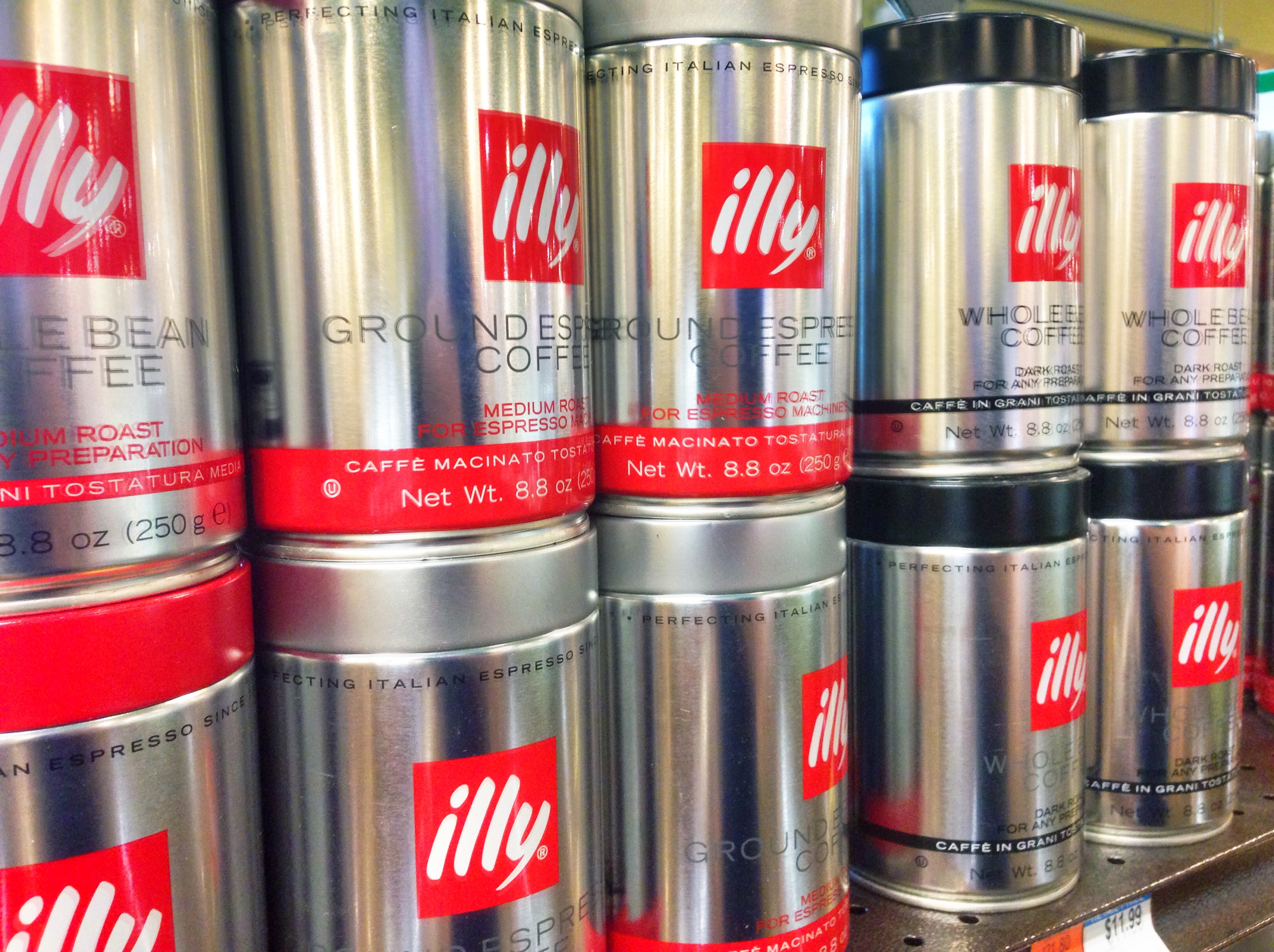
Metal canisters of illy coffee beans

Illycaffè S.p.A. markets coffee-related products in approximately 140 countries worldwide. The Illy Group is made up of several companies located in North America, France, Germany, Spain, and Benelux. The group employs approximately 800 people in these locations.

Since the end of the 1980s, illy has purchased its green (raw) coffee beans directly from source countries, rather than the international commodities markets. The company exclusively purchases coffee of the arabica species, in particular from Brazil, the largest producer worldwide, but also from Colombia, India, and countries in Africa and Central America. Illy's Università del caffè ("University of Coffee") offers free training for growers. In Brazil, a nine-month program (one week per month) includes 360 hours of lectures. Illy buys between 10% and 30% of coffee produced by growers trained at the University of Coffee at a premium price, but does not require that the growers enter into an exclusive contract with the company.

Illy was the world's first company to receive the Responsible Supply Chain Process (RSCP) certification of sustainability awarded by Det Norske Veritas (DNV).

From 2004 to 2012, illycaffè funded the Ernesto Illy Trieste Science Prize to recognize scientific researchers from the developing world, in collaboration with The World Academy of Sciences (TWAS). Illy was featured in the 2006 documentary Black Gold, in reference to its marketing of coffee from Ethiopia.

In an interview with The Wall Street Journal in June 2021, chairman Andrea Illy expressed interest in expanding the company's presence in the United States, the largest coffee market in the world. He noted branding as one of the main focuses in breaking into the market, as well as strengthening the company's distribution network both online and in larger retailers such as hotels, restaurants, and cafes.

== Product lines ==
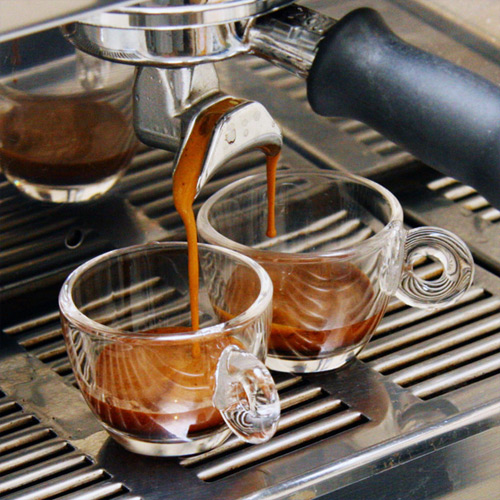
The term espresso, substituting s for most x letters in Latin-root words, with the term deriving from the past participle of the Italian verb esprimere, itself derived from the Latin exprimere, means 'to express', and refers to the process by which hot water is forced under pressure through ground coffee.

Illy coffees are blended from arabica beans from multiple sources. The grounds are packaged in steel canisters and pressurized with an inert gas rather than air.

On 22 May 2009, in partnership with the Coca-Cola Company, illy launched a line of coffee-flavoured energy drinks marketed as illy issimo. In 2009, AirTran Airways began serving the beverage to passengers, which has since been available in five flavours: caffè, caffè no sugar, cappuccino, latte macchiato, and mochaccino.

== Product design ==
In 1992, Francesco Illy, Andrea Illy's brother, launched The Illy Art Collection to collaborate with well-known artists and designers outside the coffee industry, producing artwork for the company's cups; develop company-branded coffee machines and create specialized advertising photography. Robert Rauschenberg, Francis Ford Coppola, David Byrne, Jeff Koons, Yoko Ono, and James Rosenquist (designer of illy's original logo) as well as architects Matteo Thun and Luca Trazzi have contributed coffee cup artwork. In 2006, the project extended to Illy's coffee cans. Current versions of the latest cups and other promotional pieces are marketed on the company's website, and the collection is featured in a company gallery.

== See also ==
- Domori
- Easy Serving Espresso Pod
- IperEspresso
- Single-serve coffee container
- List of Italian companies
