= Easy Serving Espresso Pod =

Packed coffee pod standard

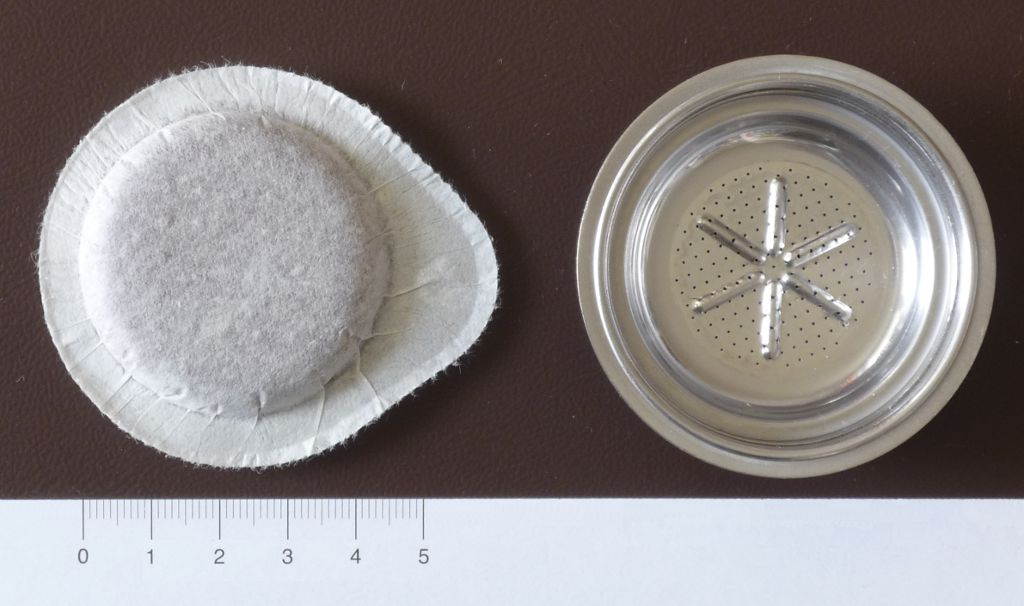
E.S.E. pod with appropriate portafilter basket

The Easy Serving Espresso pod (E.S.E. pod), is a small packed coffee pod with a paper filter covering for use in a non-grinding espresso machine. The E.S.E. standard was created by Italian Illy, based on their introduction of single-serving portions of ground and pressed coffee in the 1974. It is maintained by the "Consortium for the Development and the Protection of the E.S.E. Standard." It is open to all coffee roasters and machine manufacturers, making it the self-acclaimed "only open system available to the sector for espresso coffee prepared with paper pods".

== Description ==
Each E.S.E. pod contains seven grams of coffee compressed into a filter pod with a 44mm diameter. In the past, many USA home single-serve brewers used 55mm pods and could not use E.S.E. pods. Also incompatible are Senseo single-serve coffee pods which are larger in diameter (70mm).

The pod is placed within a pod adapter in a normal espresso machine or inside the brewing chamber of a pod brewer. The original patent for filter pod technology was registered by K. Cyrus Melikian of Automatic Brewers And Coffee Devices, Inc.(ABCD) in Pennsylvania, US, in 1959. Eventually, licenses for pod technology were granted to an Italian firm and other developers, who created specific standards for proprietary technologies.

The original use of pod machines in Italy was to relieve designated office personnel from the tedium of continuous espresso brewing for office staff. In later years pod brewers were developed for the home market, and for restaurants and other food service businesses where espresso was not a specialty. The use of a pod brewer eliminated most of the training required to operate conventional espresso machines.

== History of E.S.E. ==
In 1974, Illy introduced ESE, "the first pre-measured espresso pods" in the market consisting of "single-serving portions of ground and tampted coffee". They applied for a patent for a coffee machine extracting coffee pods in 1980 which was granted in 1986.

The E.S.E. design was created by illy in 1989 as a marketing effort to sell convenience in home espresso preparation.

In February 1998, the non-profit "Consortium for the Development and the Protection of the E.S.E. Standard" was founded by seven coffee roasters and machine manufacturers as a guardian of the E.S.E. brand and standard. The E.S.E. specification was intended to be an open design to encourage wide adoption in order to give customers the "freedom of choice and guarantee of quality".

== Espresso taste ==
Pod brewers allow many food and beverage servers to provide a standardized quality of espresso with repeatable results every time. Some coffee aficionados consider the taste to be markedly inferior to traditional espresso made with freshly ground beans, however, the quality of a cup of espresso is highly subjective, and freshly made espresso is dependent upon the skill of the barista and the maintenance and calibration of the equipment and other factors. Thus, a consumer can often get an inferior cup of espresso from an expensive traditional machine and fresh coffee, if the preparer does not make the espresso properly.

Pod users and manufacturers cite inconsistent results from traditional methods as reasons why consumers will sometimes cease to patronize traditional espresso servers, and maintain that the consistent quality of premium espresso pods is comparable to the average cup of hand-crafted espresso, and often creates more consumer loyalty. Current pod technology produces a high volume of crema, the foam created at the top of the cup, and a taste that many consumers find comparable with what is available in current espresso bars. This assessment may be due in part to the lesser frequency of proper barista training by many coffee vendors.

The Telegraph noted in an article that Starbucks had temporarily closed some of its outlets to retrain baristas, citing problems with barista preparation of espresso drinks and poor practices such as re-foaming milk or calibrating pressure for non-optimal brewing time. Pod manufacturers note that these problems are generally reduced by the use of automatic machines and pod technology.

Advantages of pods include convenience and speed of preparation and easy cleaning, consistency of taste, and less waste of coffee grounds.

Disadvantages include significantly higher cost per serving, a weaker coffee than one would get from freshly ground coffee in a larger holder, and a limited selection of suppliers, as well as some paper waste when the pods are discarded, and mylar film waste from the pouches in which the pods are packed. However, pod manufacturers use only 0.2 grams of paper fiber in a typical 44 mm pod, and this fiber is easily degradable, so the main waste is the pouch packaging film.

== See also ==
- Coffee pod
