= Association Scientifique Internationale pour le Café =

Association Scientifique Internationale pour le Café (ASIC) (established 1966 in Paris) was initiated by Institut Français du Café et du Cacao, to "establish an inventory of scientific and applied knowledge and to encourage, carry out and coordinate research likely to contribute to a better use of coffee and its derivatives and to the improvement of coffee quality in the mutual interest of producers, wholesalers, industrialists and consumers."

ASIC has been active in major areas of coffee production such as agronomy, chemistry, physiology and logistics. It organizes the annual Scientific colloquium on coffee, the ASIC 2008 to be held in Campinas, Brazil, and publishes bulletins on scientific development. ASIC is governed by a fifteen-member Board, of which not more than 1/4 represent private industry. Its president is Andrea Illy.
