= Emilio Lavazza =

Italian businessman

Emilio Lavazza (1932–2010) was an Italian businessman. Known as, "Mr. Espresso," he shaped the way many Italians drink their coffee and dedicated half of his lifetime to provide quality coffee globally. Lavazza served as the Chief and President of the Lavazza company. He served as President of Lavazza from 1979 until 2008.Throughout his lifetime, he had received much recognition such as, Honorary President prior to retiring his position in the Lavazza company. In 2010, Lavazza died due to a severe heart attack in Turin, Italy. The Lavazza company, today, is the sixth biggest coffee roaster with mustering over $1.1billion euros in sales. The company sells coffee in more than 90 countries after Emilio's reign as head of Lavazza.

== Personal life ==
Emilio Lavazza was born on August 7, 1932, in Turin, Italy. Lavazza was married to Maria Teresa, who is a socialist and a humanitarian. She was also the captain of the Italian National Bridge Team, known as the "Second Blue Team." Lavazza and Teresa have two children: Joseph (son), and Francesca (daughter). According to Lavazza's spokesperson, he was described as having a reserved-calm introverted personality. Despite having this reserved personality, he was also a multi-dimensional person who enjoyed various activities: playing golf, fishing, reading murder mystery books, listening to jazz music, and collecting models of soldiers. Lavazza had written two murder mystery books. On February 18, 2010, Lavazza died at the age of 78, leaving his wife and two children to take charge of the company.

== Emilio Lavazza's History ==
As Lavazza grew older, he became invested in his family business that was started by his grandfather, Luigi, in 1895. Previously, Luigi worked as a salesman, but soon bought a coffee shop which transformed into the Lavazza company. Emilio joined the company in 1955. His role in the company expanded when his father, Beppe, died in 1971. He became the Chief Executive and succeeded his uncle Pericle and became the company's President in 1979.

Emilio spoke multiple languages, including Portuguese, French, and English, which assisted him in making the company more successful. By the year of 1892, the Lavazza company had expanded in international countries, such as France, (Germany), Austria, and Switzerland. To promote the brand, Lavazza used the "bandwagon tactic" by using famous-award winning actors, Luciano Pavarotti and Monica Vitti, to promote the Lavazza coffee brand.

Lavazza had invested himself in advancing technology to produce greater quality of coffee. He called the need for having coffee capsules for shot brewing, and developed the technology to roast and vend the coffee in the later years of his leadership within the company.

In addition, he made a productive partnership coalition with Catalan Chef Ferran Adria, who is the founder of "Molecular gastronomy" and worked at El Bulli restaurant. With this collaboration, they worked together to produce novelty coffee products and Italian caviar. With the growing success of the Lavazza company under Emilio's reign, he managed to obtain recognition worldwide. He received various honors, such as becoming the President of European Coffee Roasters Associazione Italiana Industrie Prodotti Alimentari and was honored with the title of "Cavaliere del Lavoro" by the Italian President in 1991.

In 2001, Lavazza further expanded the company in Portugal to reinforce the idea of internationalism. Furthermore, in 2015, the Lavazza company faced inconsistent fluctuations in their shares, which resulted in the Keurig company to buy half of the shares that are worth $624 million. The Lavazza company has a home beverage maker share that is worth approximately 6.6% and in February, the shares' value dropped 7.8%. Keurig purchased 5.2 million shares with a 3% discount because of the stock's declining prices. Because of this, Keurig was able to maintain the stability of the company's condition.

Prior to retiring, on February 1, 2008, Lavazza signed an agreement to occupy one of the Brazilian companies, Cafe Grao Nobre Ltda, in Rio de Janeiro, Brazil. After signing the agreement, Lavazza had also obtained Cafe Terra Brasil in Sao Paulo, Brazil. With these two major transactions, the Lavazza company becomes one of the major coffee vendors in the world.

== The Lavazza Company Today ==
Emilio Lavazza, who died on February 16, is survived by his wife and their son and daughter, both are directors of the company.

Today, the Lavazza company sells coffee in four broad categories: ground, whole bean, espresso, and single serve in the variations of dark to medium roastings. The pricing of the coffee typically varies from $0.00 to $30.00 maximum.

By 2014, the company's profits had increased to $139.9 million after Emilio's death.
