= Lavazza (surname) =

Lavazza is an Italian surname. Notable people with the surname include:

- Luigi Lavazza (1859–1949), Italian businessman and founder of Lavazza coffee
- Emilio Lavazza (1932–2010), Italian businessman

== See also ==
- Lavazza (Luigi Lavazza S.p.A.), an Italian manufacturer of coffee products founded in Turin in 1895 by Luigi Lavazza
- Barista Lavazza (India), a chain of espresso bars in India, headquartered in Delhi
