= Grounds for Coffee =

Coffee shop franchise in the United States

- Company type: Private
- Industry: Restaurant
- Founded: 1989
- Headquarters: Ogden, Utah, US
- Number of locations: 7
- Area served: North America
- Key people: Suzie Daley; Dan Daley
- Products: Coffee; Tea and herbal teas Made-to-order beverages Assorted food Merchandise
- Website: groundsforcoffee.com

Grounds for Coffee is a locally owned cooperative of coffee shop owners operating in Utah. The first Grounds for Coffee shop opened in Salt Lake City in 1989. The business currently operates as a franchise owned by Dan and Suzy Dailey, with multiple shops located in Ogden, Layton, and Sunset, Utah. One independently owned shop also operates under the Grounds for Coffee name in Clearfield, Utah. Grounds for Coffee also operates a mail-order business via its website, selling fresh roasted coffee beans.

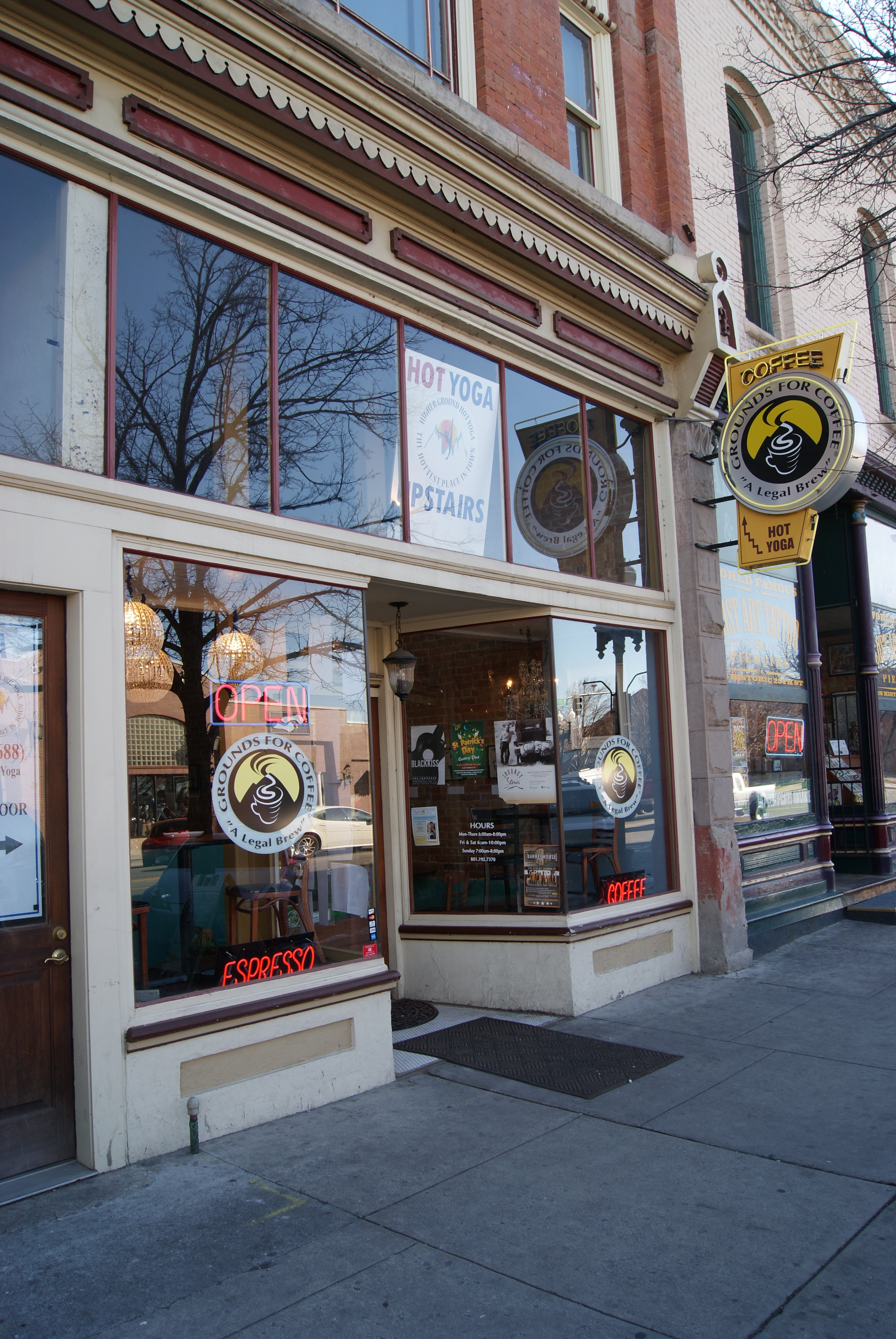
Grounds for Coffee in Ogden, Utah, on historic 25th St.

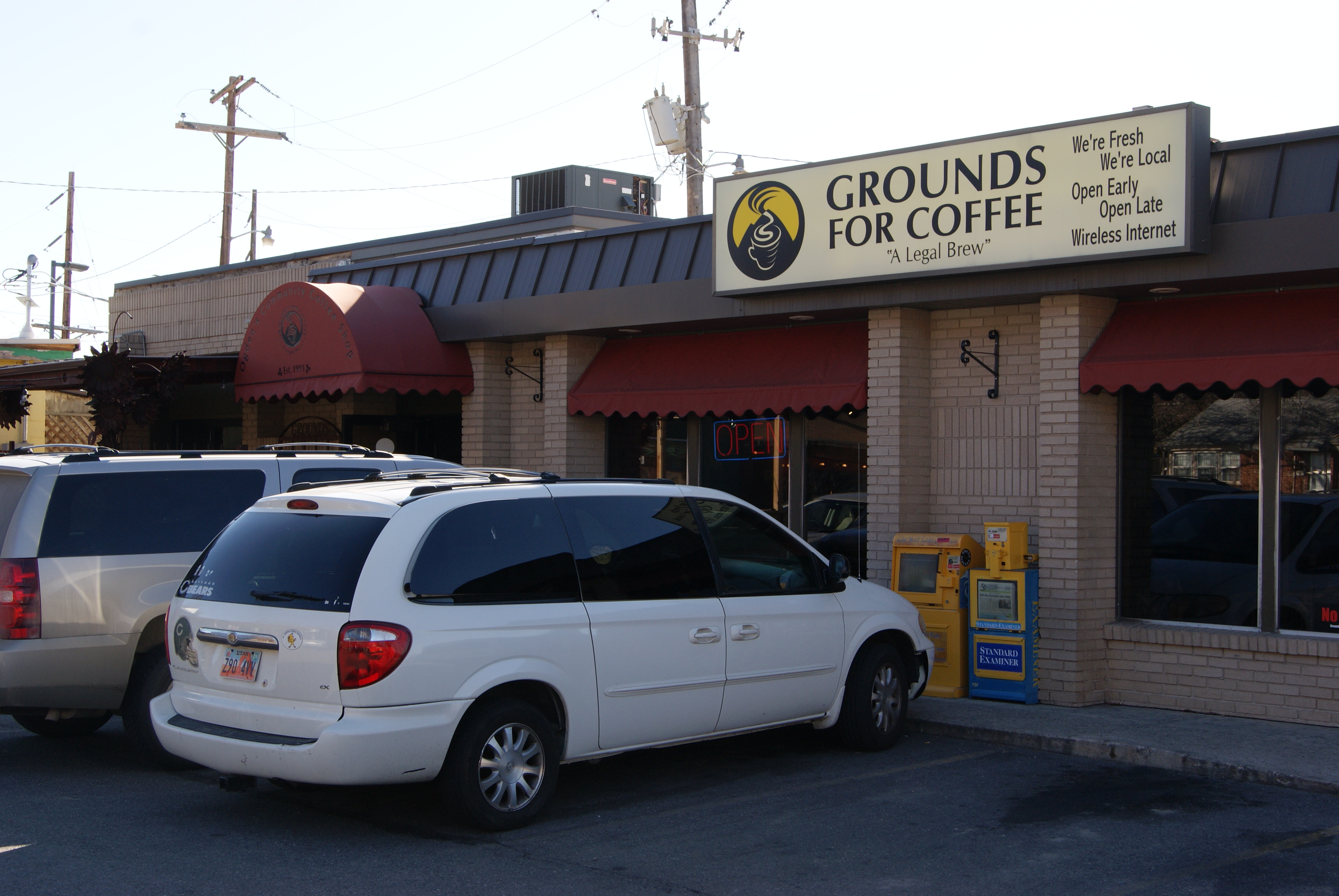
Grounds for Coffee in Ogden, Utah, on Harrison Blvd.

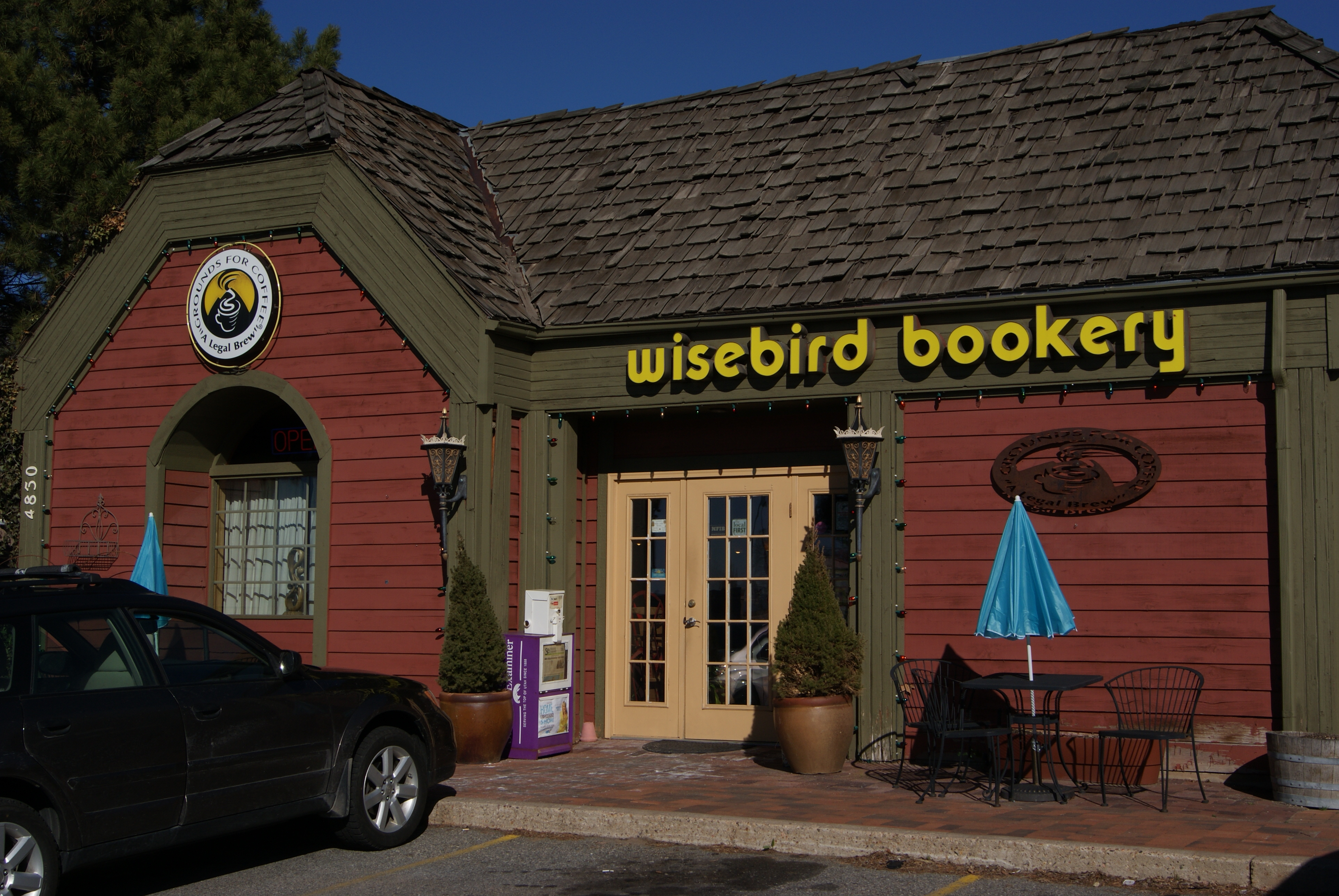
Grounds for Coffee in Ogden, Utah, at the Wisebird Bookery location on Harrison Blvd.

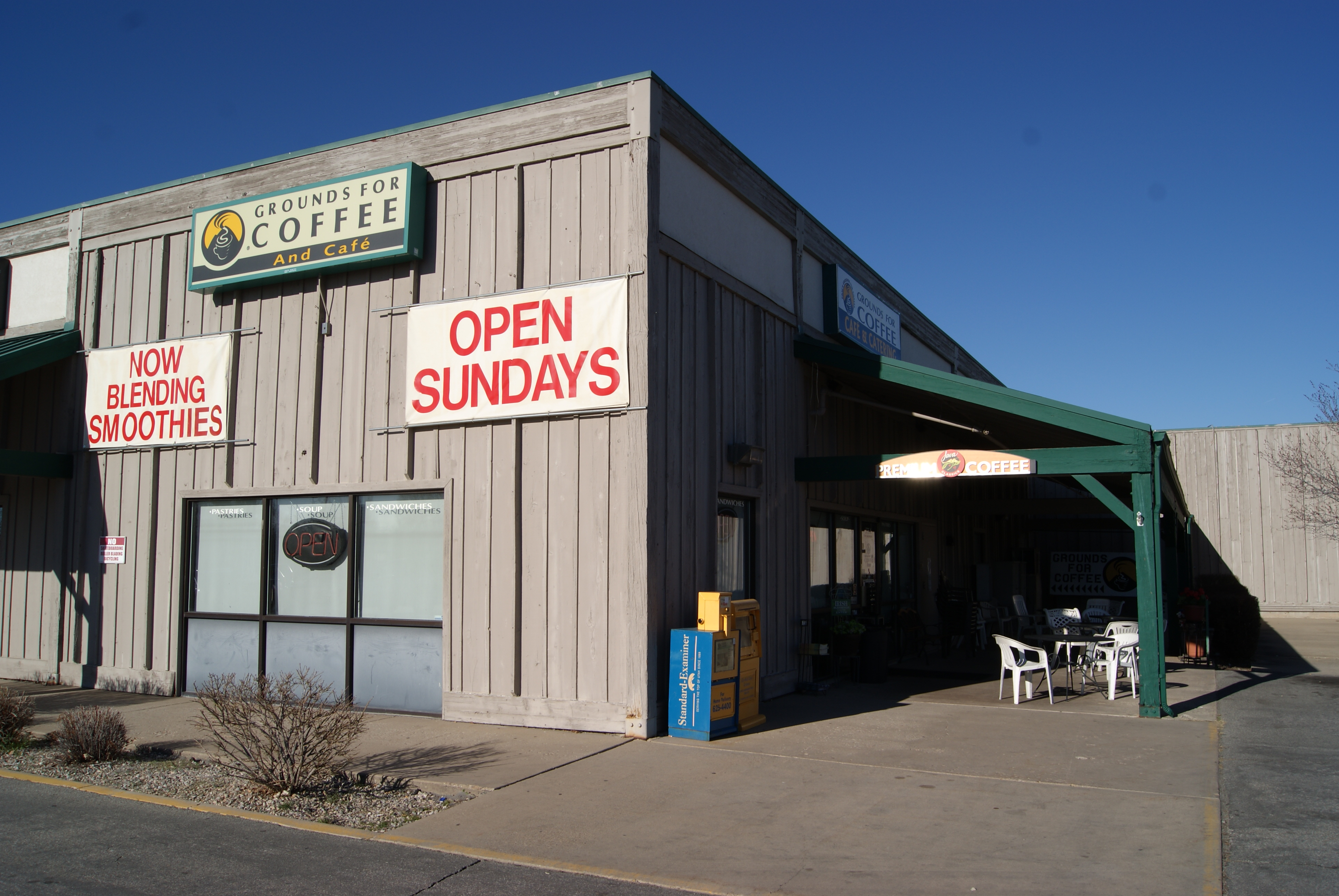
Grounds for Coffee in Clearfield, Utah

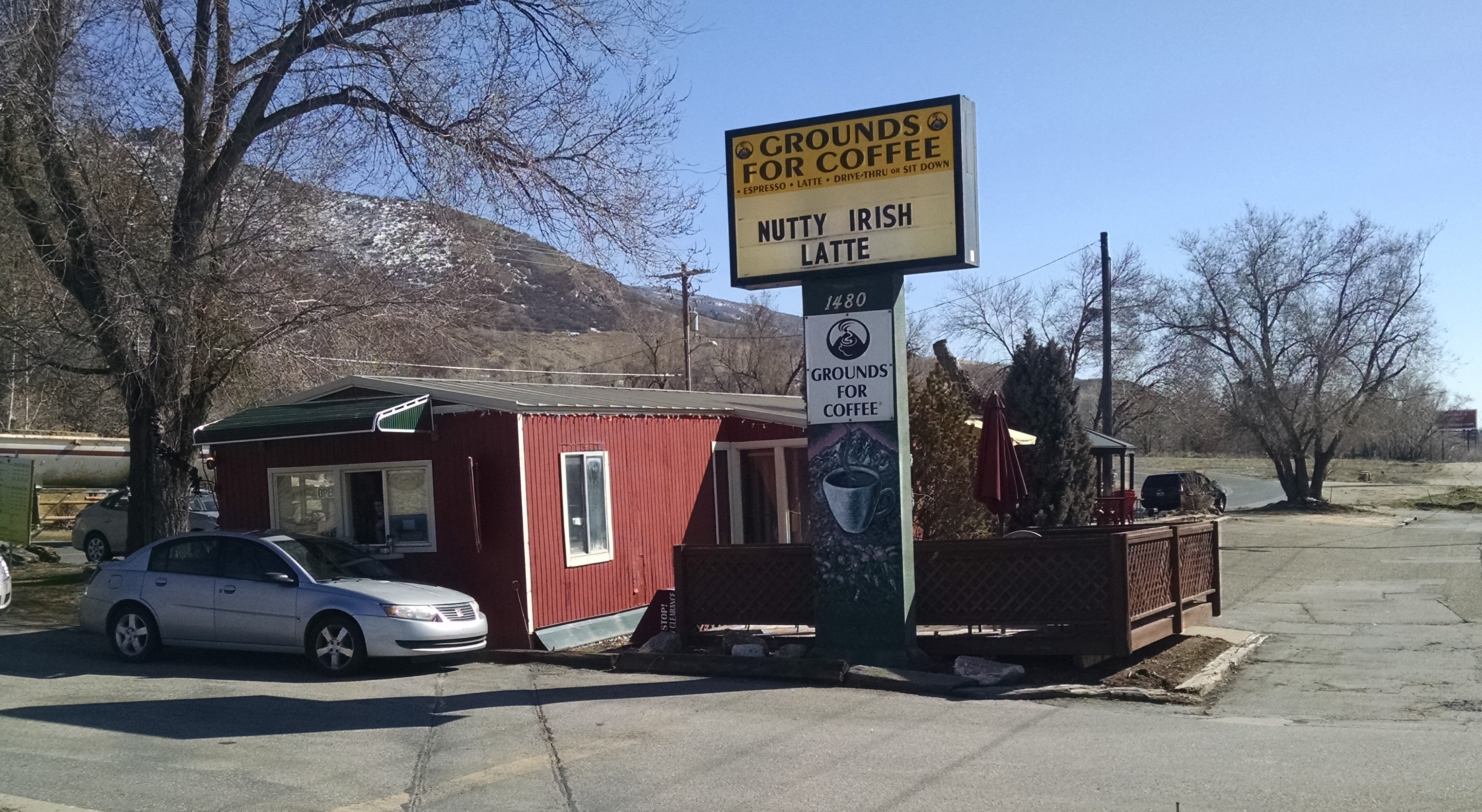
Grounds for Coffee in Layton, Utah on Highway 89

== History ==
Grounds for Coffee opened its first location approximately 1989 adjacent to Liberty Park in Salt Lake City. The original owners (Bendt and Sandra Johnson) operated as a licensed retail coffee business and roaster. By the early 1990s they had nine separately owned and operated locations mostly in Salt Lake City, with a shop in both Ogden and Clearfield which carried their name, drink recipes, and line of roasted coffee beans. By the mid- to late 90s the Johnsons closed the roasting operation and left Utah. This left each existing shop to operate as an individual location. One by one they mostly closed with the exception of the shop at 3005 Harrison Blvd., Ogden owned and operated by Dan & Suzy Dailey and the Clearfield shop owned and operated by Pam McLaughlin at 375 South State St. (Lakeside Square), in Clearfield. It was at this point in time that Dan and Suzy Dailey acquired the trademarked logo and Grounds for Coffee name. They restructured the operation from a licensed business to a franchise. With only the two existing locations, Pam McLaughlin was invited but declined the offer to operate under the new franchise. She continued to operate independently from, and amicably with, the Daileys until February 25, 2024.

In 1991, Grounds for Coffee had a coffee shop at 4881 South Redwood Road in Salt Lake City owned by Lew and Holly, which is now the location of another coffee house called Hidden Peaks Gourmet, located a few blocks from the Salt Lake Community College.

In 1996, Grounds for Coffee experimented with setting up a "Cappuccino Corner" located on the Salt Lake Community College campus on Redwood Road.

== Locations ==
As of April 2015 eight coffee shops operate under the Grounds for Coffee franchise. They are:

- 3005 Harrison Blvd., Ogden UT 84403, opened by Dan & Suzy Dailey on January 15, 1992
- 1480 Hwy. 89, Layton UT 84404, opened by Jennifer Zeemer in 2000 and purchased by Tim & Teri Ohrenberger in 2009. It was then sold to Taylour Campbell in 2021.
- 111 Historic 25th Street, Ogden UT 84401, opened in 2004 By Dan & Suzy Dailey and taken over operationally by Sadie Clifford in 2009. This location includes a Bake Shop
- McKay-Dee Hospital Center, Ogden UT coffee kiosk opened by Dan and Suzy Dailey in the original hospital site in 1999 and relocated to the new hospital in 2002
- 4101 Riverdale Rd, Riverdale UT 84405 opened by Sadie Clifford Gleave in October 2012, this location closed in August 2015
- 2853 North Main St. Sunset UT opened by Dan & Suzy Dailey in January 2014
- Ogden Regional Medical Center UT opened by Sadie Clifford in December 2015
- 157 North Commercial St. Morgan UT opened by Adam & Shauna Walker in March 2016

Grounds for Coffee operates franchised locations that include full-service cafés, drive-through outlets, and kiosk formats, each independently owned and operated. The franchise structure allows individual owners to determine aspects such as interior design, product offerings, operating hours, and pricing, while maintaining a consistent menu of coffee and espresso-based drinks, standardised ingredients and recipes, and a focus on customer service and community engagement. Locations are typically presented as local businesses reflecting their respective markets.

== Honors ==
In October 2012, Indie Ogden in Utah awarded Grounds for Coffee as the Best Local Coffee.

== Community ==
Grounds for Coffee is known for its community presence, sponsoring and partnering with many local businesses and events. The 30th and Harrison location regularly held shows by artists' work from Weber State University. There was an occasion however in 1994, where the management at that time had determined that the subject matter was too offensive for some patrons, and remove those which contained paintings and photographs of nudity.

On "Make a Difference Day" held on May 12, 2011, and also on May 10, 2012, included notable partners the McKay-Dee Hospital Center, the LDS Church, the Ogden School District, the Ogden Nature Center, the Utah Transit Authority, the YMCA, the Utah Division of Juvenile Justice Services and the Keller Williams Realty. It is a member of Local First Utah, a network of many local businesses and non-profits that emphasizes the importance of buying local products.

In 2014, the Clearfield location hosted their first "Coffee with a Cop" meeting, in which locals could learn more about local law enforcement and engage in feedback.

== See also ==
- List of coffeehouse chains
