= Lavazza A Modo Mio =

Coffee capsule and machine brand

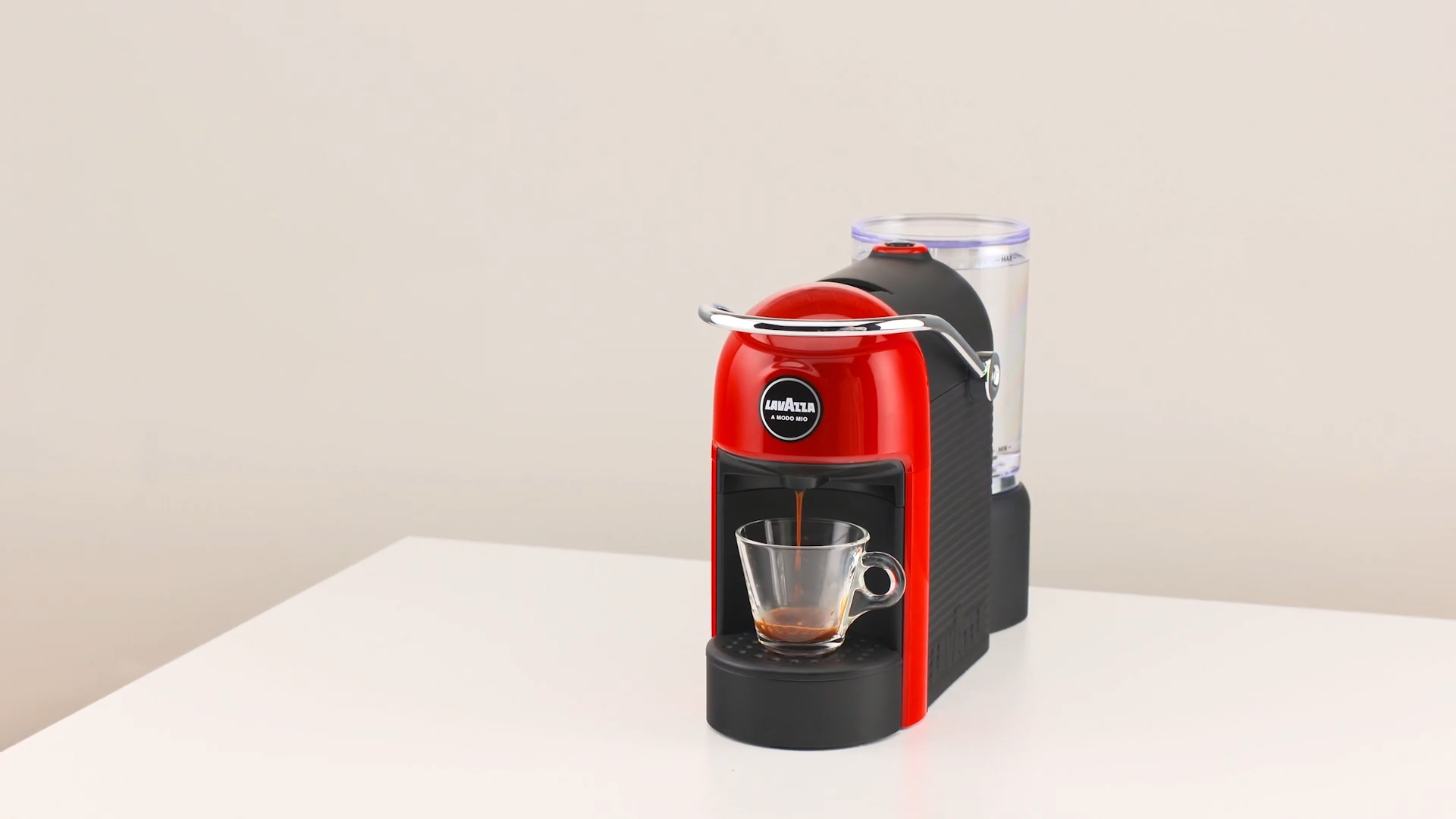
Lavazza A Modo Mio “Jolie” coffee machine

Lavazza A Modo Mio is a range of coffee capsules and machines produced by Lavazza since 2007. The A Modo Mio range is aimed at domestic use and supports the "Lavazza Blue" range of capsules designed for the business target.

The main competitors are Nescafè Dolce Gusto, Illy IperEspresso and the Nespresso capsule range.

== History ==
Officially launched in 2007, the A Modo Mio family is composed of a range of single-dose coffee capsules and related series of coffee machines developed by Lavazza and Saeco and produced by Saeco in Italy. The coffee capsules consist of a plastic cylinder containing up to 7.5 grams (0.26 oz) of ground coffee that is vacuum-pressed and sealed by an aluminum cap. The system is designed to remedy the defects of coffee pods which, if not correctly inserted, cause water leakage and alteration of the drink. In contrast to the institutionally-marketed Lavazza Blue pods, the A Modo Mio pods are sold in supermarkets.

Lavazza made an agreement with Seico to produce coffee machines compatible only with the A Modo Mio system. It invested €10,000,000 for the A Modo Mio system and 6 million euro for advertising and marketing. The capsules are produced at the Mokapak factory in Gattinara, in the province of Vercelli, where the "Lavazza Blue" capsules are also produced.

In 2007 the first two coffee machines called "Saeco Extra" and "Saeco Premium" were launched, as well as the first range of capsules in four different flavors. Each package contained 16 capsules at a price of 5.49 euro, equal to about 0.34 euro per capsule.

After the launch, Lavazza continued with the expansion of both the range of capsules and the range of coffee machines. 2010 saw the introduction of the “Lavazza Piccina”, produced by Saeco. It had a more compact size, removable capsule collection tank, and steam nozzle.

In 2015 Lavazza introduced the A Modo Mio Fantasia coffee machine designed together with Electrolux. Fantasia has both short and long coffee modes and a milk frother.

== See also ==
- Single-serve coffee container
