= Jane Kim (artist) =

American painter

- Born: 1981 (age 44–45); United States
- Education: Rhode Island School of Design, California State University, Monterey Bay
- Known for: Conservation murals
- Style: Scientific illustration
- Website: http://inkdwell.com/

Jane Kim (born 1981) is an American painter, science illustrator and the founder of the Ink Dwell studio. She is best known for her large-scale murals, created with the purpose of promoting advocacy of the natural world.

== Biography ==
Jane Kim was born in 1981, and raised in Mount Prospect, Illinois. Kim studied at Rhode Island School of Design (RISD) and received her B.F.A. in printmaking in 2003. She moved to San Francisco the same year of her graduation in 2003, living initially in the Tenderloin neighborhood. Kim later attended California State University, Monterey Bay to study scientific illustration, graduating in 2010.

In 2012, Kim started the process of creating the Migrating Mural, a series of six murals featuring Sierra Nevada bighorn sheep. The murals span 120 miles of California’s Highway 395. Fundraising for the project took place on the crowd funding platform, Kickstarter.

Kim was a featured artist in the Facebook Artist Residency program. Her work is located in a Facebook campus stairwell featuring graphic portraits of local, native birds and a second mural with illustrations of the local Facebook campus foxes.

In 2015, Kim completed a 70-foot by 40-foot mural called the Wall of Birds at Cornell University's Lab of Ornithology. The mural depicts 243 modern bird families, all life size and superimposed on a map of the earth. It took her two and a half years to complete the work.

In 2016, Kim served as an artist-in-residency at the de Young Museum and explored the idea of native and non-native ecology in San Francisco.

In 2017, Kim painted the Flora From Fauna series of six murals around Redwood City, California to commemorate a lost industry of the 1920s when Japanese immigrants were growing and exporting chrysanthemums from the city. Unfortunately much of the chrysanthemum industry was lost during World War II and the internment of Japanese-Americans.

InkDwell studio moved to Half Moon Bay, California in 2018 and is by appointment only. In 2023, she was interviewed by Half Moon Bay Review where she highlighted that she has been focusing on making her art pieces more nature-oriented and further stating, "Nature has always been my muse, but in art school I was discouraged from doing this kind of work."

== Publications ==
- Kim, Jane; Walker, Thayer (2018). The Wall of Birds. Harper Collins. ISBN 9780062687869.

== Murals ==
This is a list of select murals completed by InkDwell studio and Jane Kim.

- Migrating Mural (2012) featuring Sierra Nevada bighorn sheep in multiple murals, 120 mile stretch along Highway 395 in California
- Wall of Birds (2015) Cornell University's Lab of Ornithology, Ithaca, New York
- Flora From Fauna (2017), six murals scattered around downtown, Redwood City, California
- Migrating Mural (2017), featuring an array of monarch butterflies and caterpillar on the side of an eight-story-tall air traffic control tower at the airport, Springdale, Arkansas
- Migrating Mural (2018), featuring images of monarch butterflies on plants, Full Sail University, Winter Park, Florida
- Migrating Mural (2018), featuring monarch butterflies in three murals, Ogden Nature Center, Ogden, Utah
- Migrating Mural (2019), featuring monarch butterflies in multiple murals, San Francisco, California
