= Single-serve coffee container =

Small container filled with a portion of coffee grounds for brewing

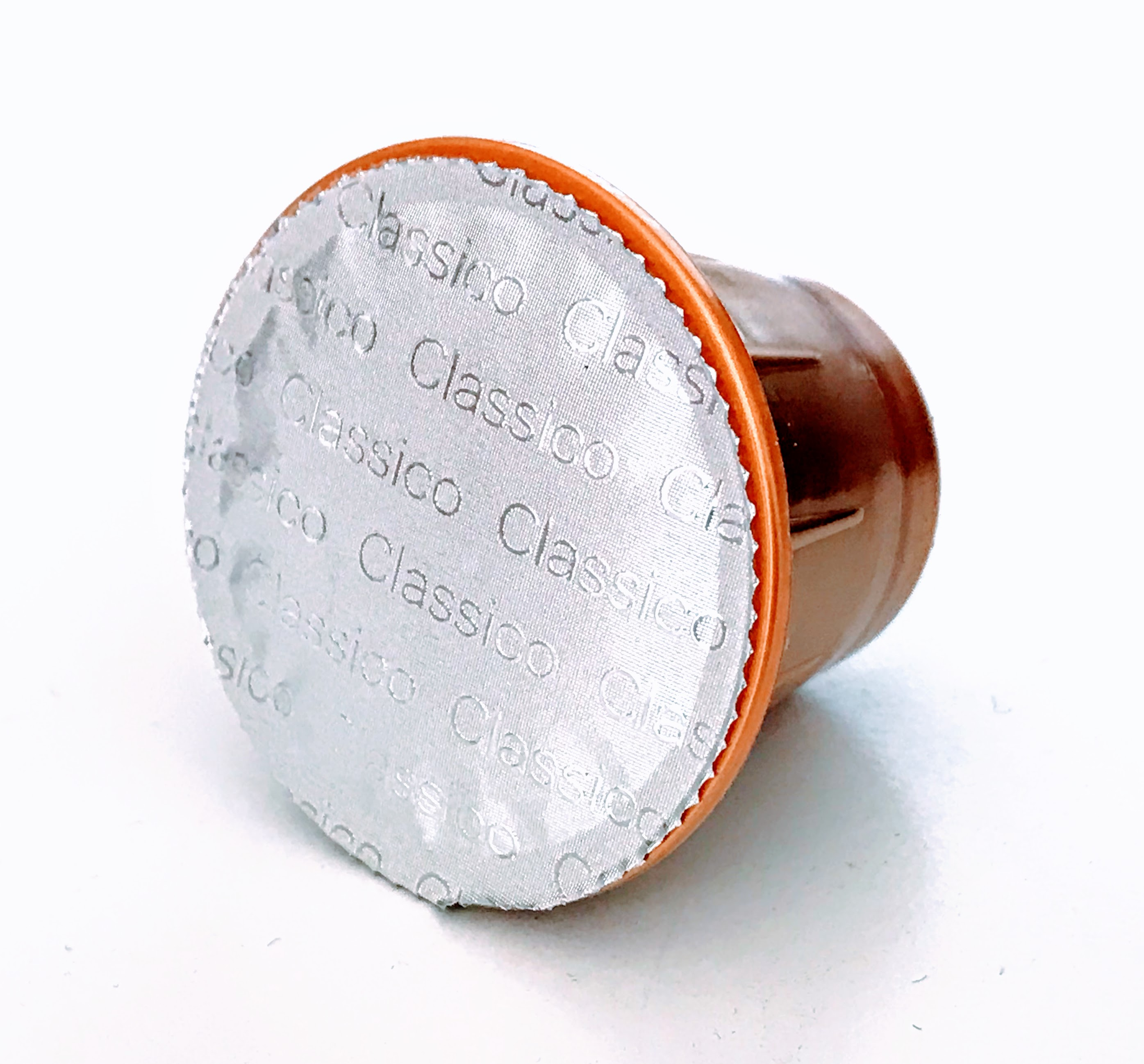
A Lidl store brand Nespresso-compatible coffee capsule

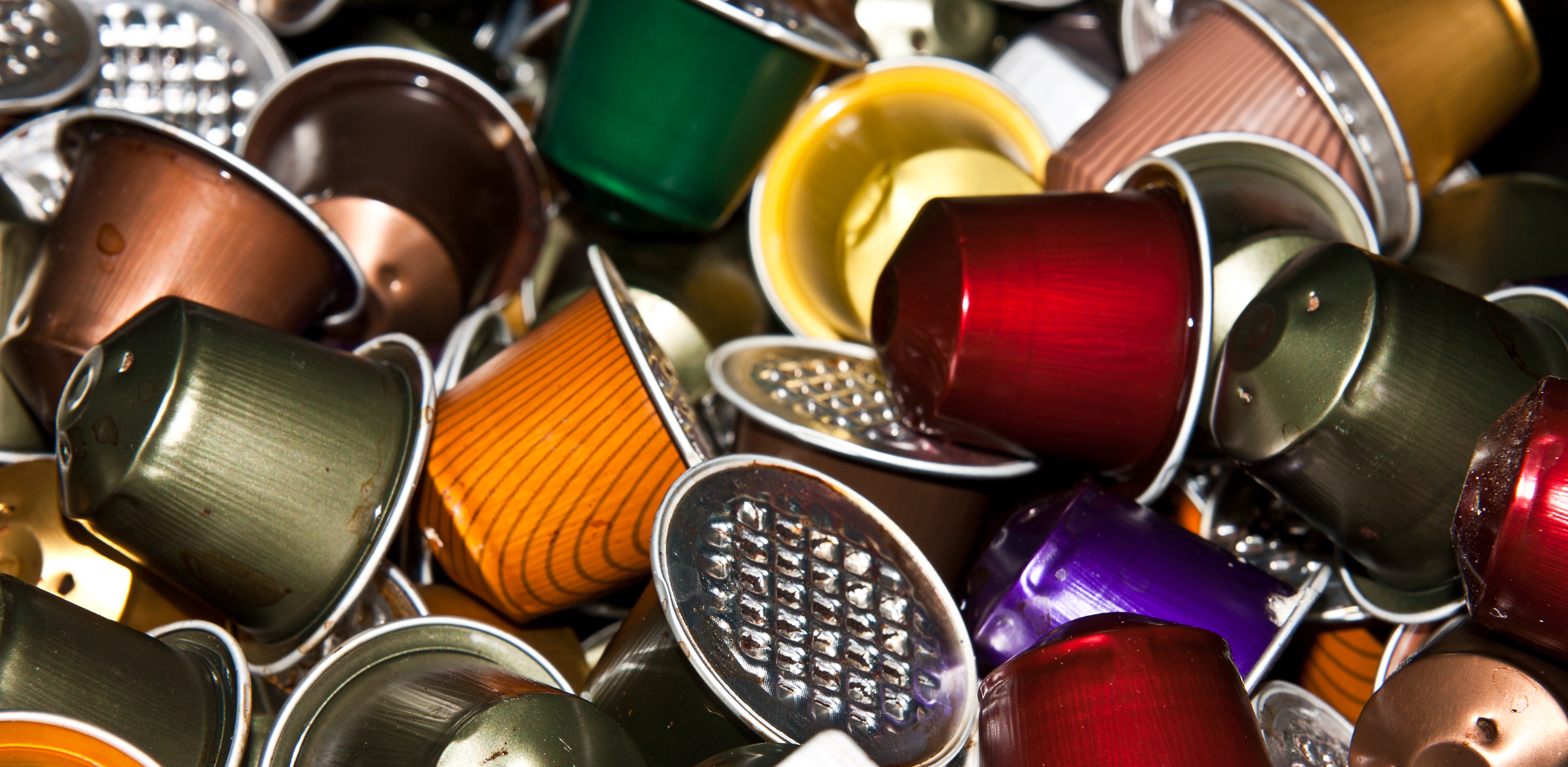
Used Nespresso coffee capsules, showing the puncture holes in the top and bottom for mixing the product with water

A single-serve coffee container is a container filled with coffee grounds, used in coffee brewing to prepare only enough coffee for a single portion. Single-serve coffee containers come in various formats and materials, often either as hard and soft pods or pads made of filter paper, or hard aluminium and plastic capsules.

Single-serve coffee containers can both reduce the time needed to brew coffee and simplify the brewing process by eliminating the need to measure out portions, flavorings, and additives from large bulk containers. They can also help to keep the unused product fresher by individually packaging portions separately without exposing the entire supply batch to air and light. Paper coffee pods can be functionally identical to plastic and metal coffee capsules, if the paper pods are individually sealed in separate bags. At the same time, the disposable single-use products add to global waste production.

== History ==
In 1958, the Flemish Rombouts coffee company launched its pre-filled One Cup Coffee Filter for the Brussels World Exhibition. Unlike newer capsules and pods, this system consists of a single-use drip coffee filter placed over the cup. In 1964, the company began marketing the concept, gaining success in the horeca and retail sectors. The company was founded in Antwerp in 1896, and in 1966 was appointed a "Certified Royal Warrant Holder of Belgium".

== Variations ==
Several different systems exist:

- Coffee pods or pads are pre-packaged ground coffee beans in their own filter.
- A coffee capsule differs from a coffee pod in that the coffee is packed in a plastic or aluminum package instead of a paper filter, and it is usually designed for use with a single brand or system and is therefore not interchangeable with other systems. A patent on the Nespresso system expired at the end of 2012, and there are now rival capsules available for the Nespresso system.
- A variation, coffee bags, were developed to provide the convenience of instant coffee but maintain the flavor of brewed coffee. Modeled after tea bags, they consist of a gauze bag containing a mixture of instant coffee and finely ground roast coffee, which is to be steeped in hot water for approximately three minutes.
- Coffee (filter) disks or ground coffee filter rings are a ring-type variant of coffee bags made of coffee filter paper containing ground roast coffee for use in coffee percolators, which otherwise use permanent filters made out of metal or porcelain. One of the first companies to offer them was General Foods Corp. with their "Max-Pax" filter rings.
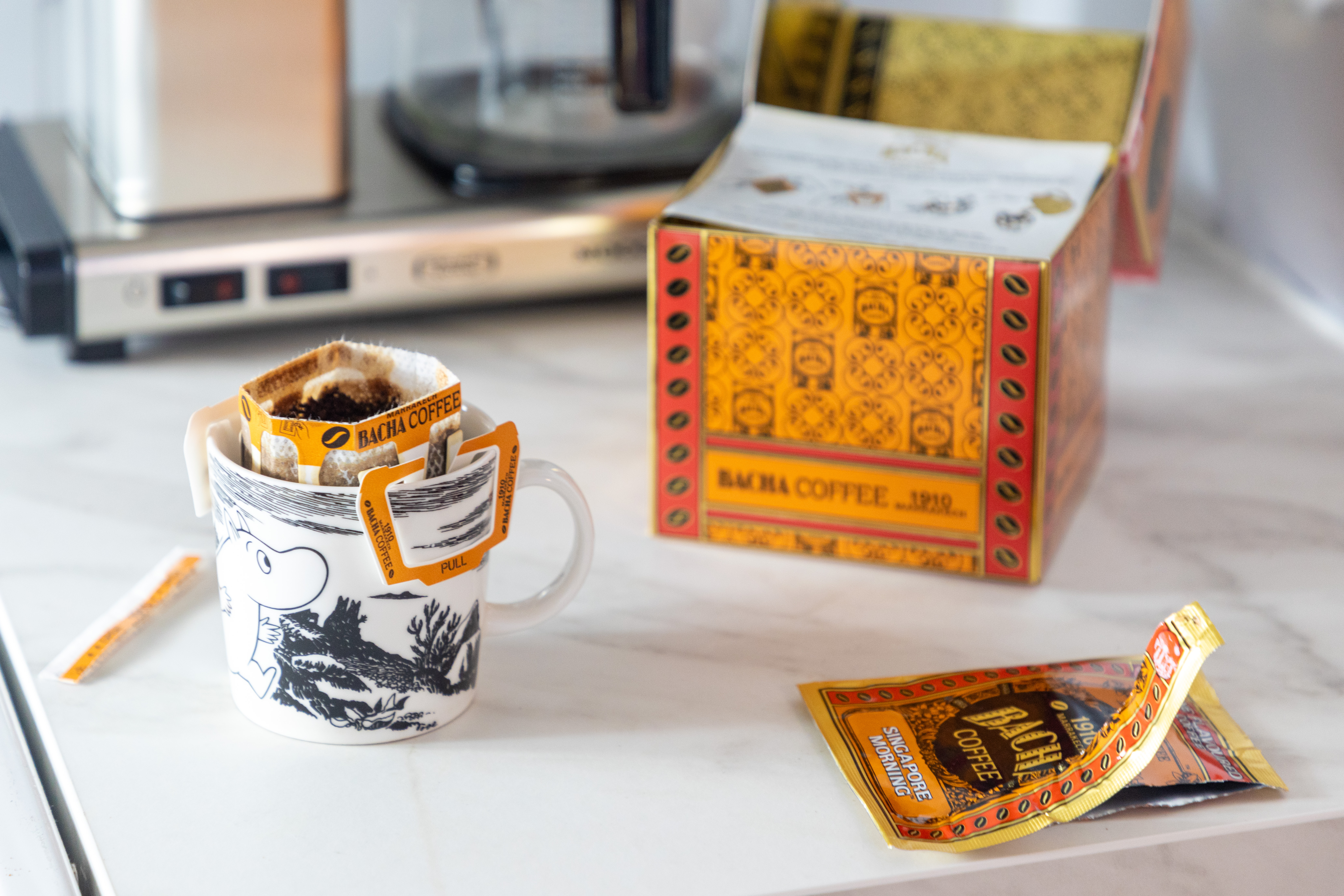
- Disposable single serve drip coffee bag
  Especially in East Asia disposable single serve drip coffee bags are common way to prepare drip coffee. The coffee is packed inside the device. There is typically perforated top edge which is peeled off to open the bag. The device contains cardboard supports to spread it over the cup. Hot water is poured from a kettle or anything that can boil the water until the lower edge of the bag gets in contact with the surface of the coffee. The benefit of this method is extremely low investment cost on equipment required to prepare decent coffee.
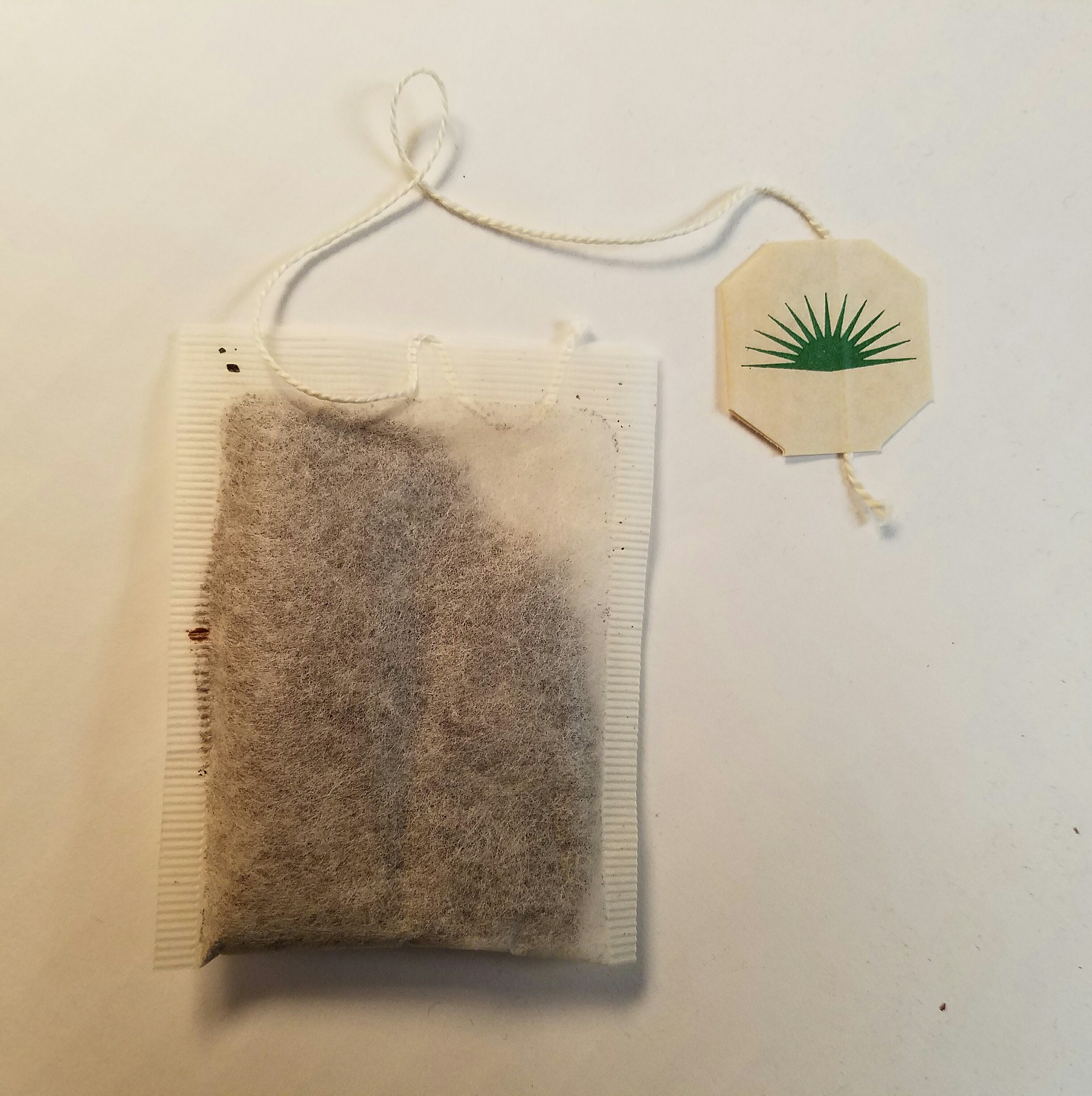
Photo of coffee bag manufactured by Folgers

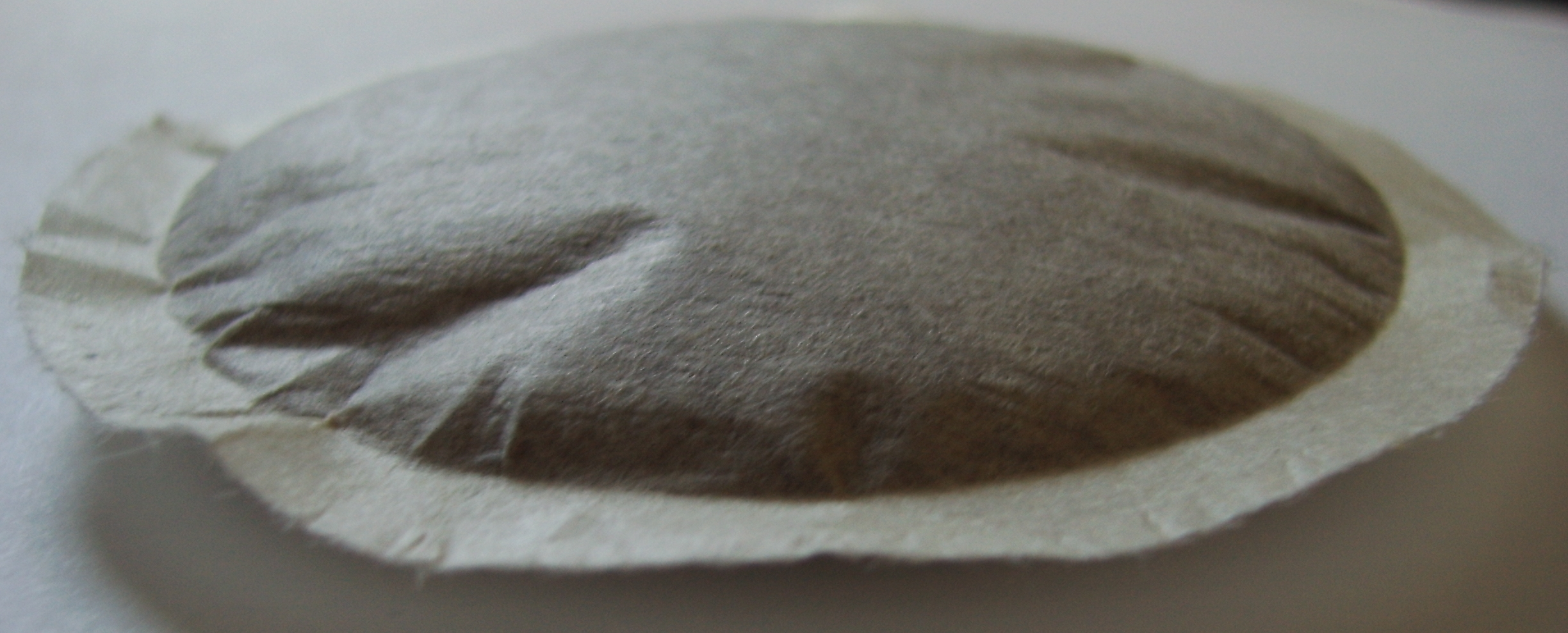
A paper coffee bag by an unknown manufacturer - E.S.E. (Easy Serving Espresso Pod)

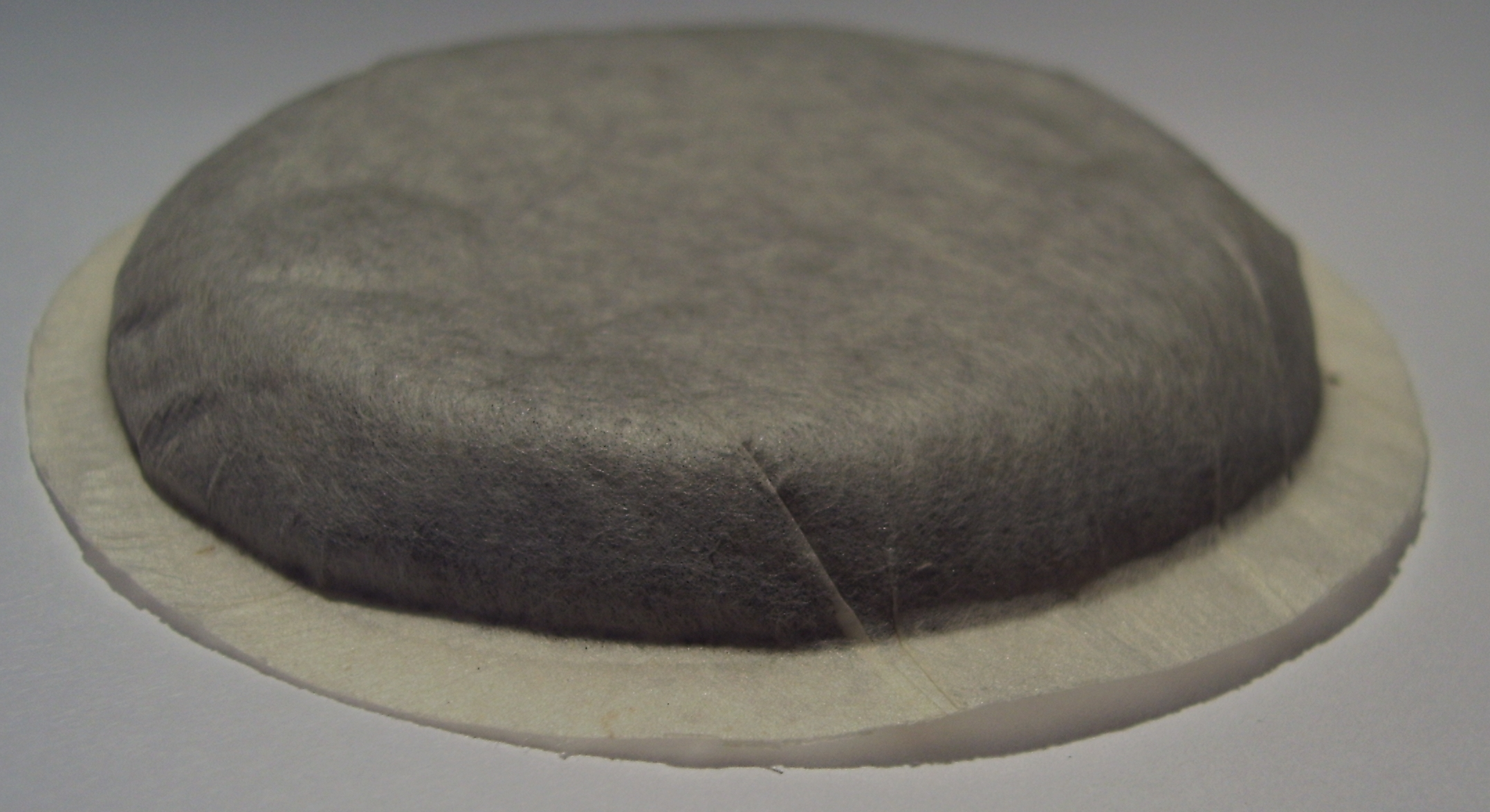
A Senseo ESE coffee pod, upside down

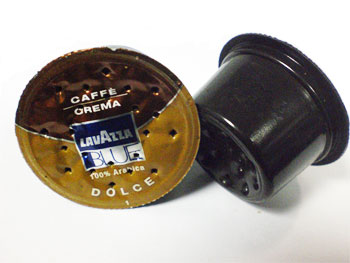
Used Lavazza BLUE coffee capsules, showing the puncture holes

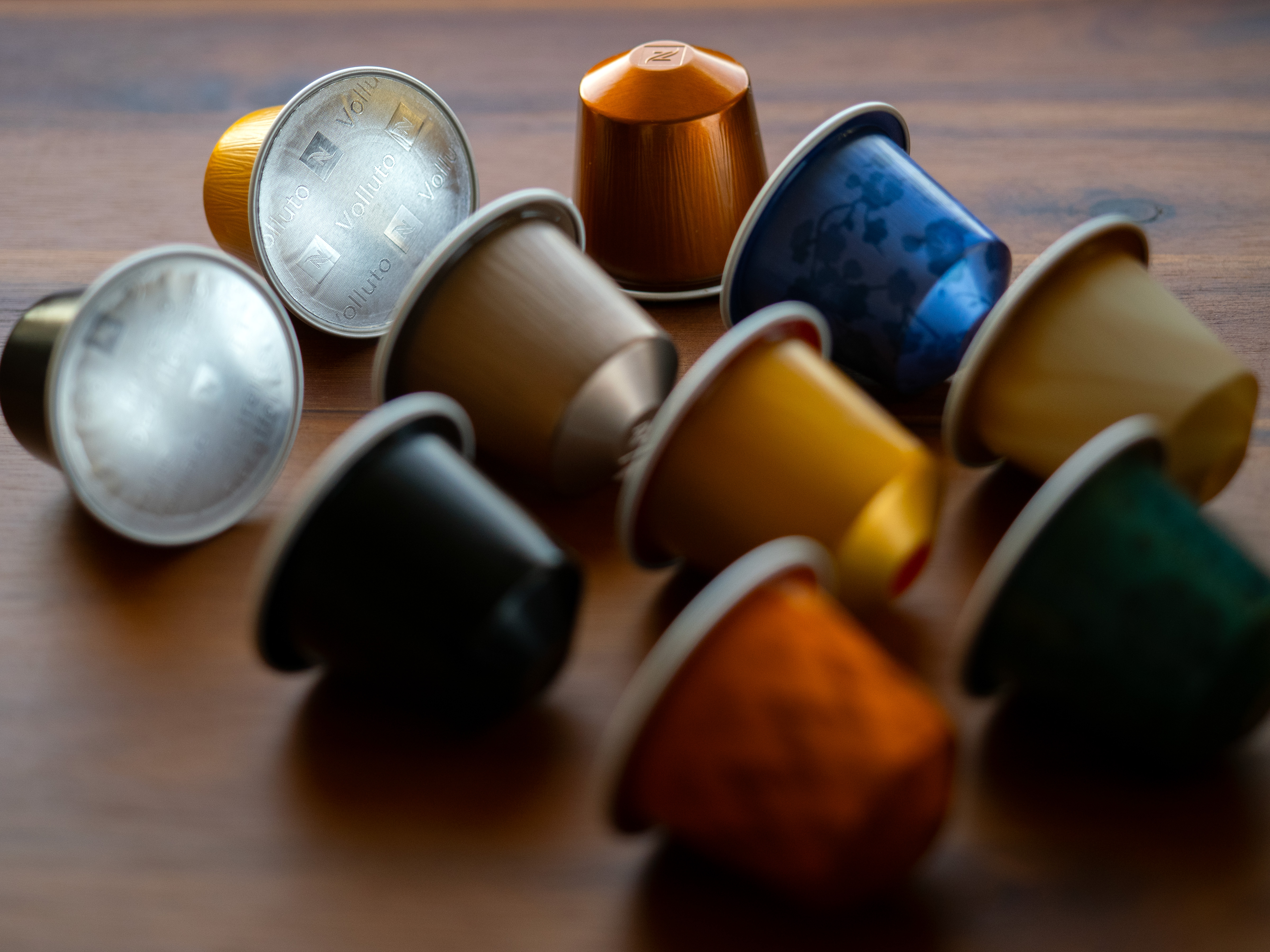
Nespresso coffee capsules

== Comparison of systems ==
The plastic and metal coffee capsules typically are used in a non-removable receptacle on the brewing device. The capsules have an outer ring or rim that stays dry during use, allowing for removal and disposal after use without getting the user's hands wet or sticky. Handling of a used moist coffee pod is not necessary if the brewing device has a removable filter tray. This tray is removed after brewing and inverted to eject the used coffee pod.

Coffee pods, bags, and capsules can be sized for individual or multi-serving portions. In food service businesses, pods and capsules used with automatic brewing can help to provide consistency of product strength and flavor for customers.

Paper coffee pods, such as those used in Easy Serving Espresso Pod or Senseo machines, have the benefit of being a fully biodegradable product that can decompose naturally, while plastic and metal capsules, such as those used in Keurig or Nespresso machines, either are not recyclable, or require additional processing to separate the plastic/metal container from the organic waste products.

Many capsule machines specifically warn the user to not disassemble the machine or put their fingers inside the capsule receptacle, as the devices commonly use sharp razor-edge tubes or prongs for piercing the coffee capsule during use.

Different single-cup systems are not interchangeable; some systems force machine owners to buy capsules from a single company (usually the patent owner), locking the machine owner into a single source of coffee. Coffee pods are made by a variety of manufacturers and are interchangeable between brand of pod and model of pod brewer most of the time.

System	Owned by	Year invented	Machine manufacturers	Capsule / pod manufacturers	Markets	Type	Notes
Espresso Point MAXI	Lavazza	1992	The ECL (Espresso e Cappuccino Lavazza) branded as 1x	Lavazza	Worldwide	Capsule	The ECL used a bi-dose capsule system and had a double dispensing head that could brew two coffees at the same time.
Espresso Point	Lavazza	1983	Uno Per branded as 1x	Lavazza	Worldwide	Capsule	The single-dose capsule machine by Uno Per (Gattinara), acquired by Lavazza in 1989
Espressotoria	Vittoria Coffee	?	?	Own brand	Australia	Capsule	Australian coffee brand that produces its own pods for its Espressotoria machines as well as Nespresso-compatible pods.
A Modo Mio	Lavazza	2007	Saeco (Philips) branded as Lavazza/Gaggia, Electrolux	Lavazza	Worldwide	Capsule	Lavazza vertical
BLUE	Lavazza	2003	?	Lavazza	Worldwide	Capsule	BLUE stands for "Best Lavazza Ultimate Espresso” - mostly used in business and vending machines
Bialetti Diva	Bialetti	2013	Bialetti	Caffè d'Italia	Worldwide	Capsule	—
Bodecker Brewer	Bodecker Brewed	2005	TBD	Bodecker Brewed	Canada	Capsule	—
Caffitaly (Caffita)	Caffita System SPA	2004	Various inc. Princess of Netherlands, Tchibo, Gaggia until recently	Various, inc. Dualit, Gaggia, Ecaffe, CBTL, Gloria Jeans, MAP, Woolworths	Central Europe, Northern Europe, Brazil, Australia	Capsule	Physically compatible with K-Fee machines/pods
Delta Q	Delta Cafés	2007	Flama, branded Delta Cafés, Brasilia S.p.A., Casa Bugatti	Delta Cafés, Tetley	Canada, Portugal, Spain, Luxembourg, Brazil, Angola, Poland	Capsule	—
Dolce Gusto	Nestle	2008	Krups, Delonghi, branded Nescafe.	Nescafe (Nestle)	Worldwide	Capsule	Nestle vertical. Also brews cold beverages. Limited Edition machine designs also available. Rewards program.Capsule recycling programs exist in some countries.
Easy Serving Espresso Pod (ESE)	Italian ESE Consortium for Development	1998 (standard) and previous	Various including Delonghi, Dualit, FrancisFrancis, Handpresso, Kitchenaid, Krups and Saeco	Various	Worldwide	Pod	Open, generic standard not tied to particular vendors, pods fit most traditional espresso machines. Not all pods are 44 mm (the standard diameter).
Flavia Beverage Systems	Lavazza. Originally Mars, Inc.	1984	Flavia (Lavazza)	Alterra (Lavazza), Lavazza, La Colombe Coffee Roasters, Starbucks, Peet's	United States, Canada, Mexico, and United Kingdom	Capsule	The "fresh pack" (the capsule) is the brewing vessel, so that the drink is not tainted by previous user. Controlled by Lavazza.
Folgers	Folgers	1953	None needed	The J.M. Smucker Co.	United States	Bag	Folgers coffee singles, instant coffee
iperEspresso	Illy	2007	FrancisFrancis (Illy), Gaggia (Saeco), Cuisinart	Illy	Worldwide	Capsule	Recyclable
K-Cup (Keurig)	Keurig Dr Pepper	1992	Many: Keurig, Breville, Mr. Coffee, etc. Unauthorized clones that are branded with brands like Cuisinart and Insignia exist.	Many. Keurig's private labels include but are not limited to Green Mountain Coffee Roasters, Revv, Tully's Coffee, and The Original Donut Shop Coffee. Several other companies have licensed Keurig's K-Cup design. Unauthorized clones exist.	United States, Canada	Capsule	Two versions of My K-Cup are available as a reusable filter for using any filter coffee, with the newest version being designed to be compatible with Keurig machines with MultiStream technology since the old version is incompatible. Keurig 2.0, an attempt to lock out unlicensed clones, has been withdrawn from the market. Genuine K-Cups from Keurig and licensed partners now carry 2D bar codes to allow smart brewers with BrewID technology to brew K-Cups with factory-customized brewing profiles. Genuine K-Cups hold coffee grounds and a coffee filter that are sealed in an airtight plastic pod with an aluminum lid which has been nitrogen-purged in order to preserve the ground coffee within the pods. The patent on the original K-Cup design has expired, so unauthorized clones exist. K-Cups made since the end of 2020 are made with polypropylene to allow them to be recycled. Residential and commercial mail back recycling programs exist.
Compostable K-Cup clones such as PurPod100 and OneCUP	Club Coffee (PurPod100), OneCoffee, San Francisco Bay Coffee (OneCUP), and others	2015	Many: Keurig, Cuisinart, BUNN etc.	Many, including OneCoffee, San Francisco Bay Coffee, and Club Coffee. Formerly used by brands of Massimo Zanetti Beverage Group until Massimo Zanetti licensed genuine K-Cups.	United States, Canada	Capsule	A soft-bottomed non-airtight pod that is designed to be compatible with Keurig K-Cup machines. It is made with compostable materials. These are unauthorized clones of the K-Cup. One or more older versions are incompatible with Keurig brewers with MultiStream technology and require an adapter ring to make them work in such brewers.
K-Fee	Krüger Group	2010	Aldi Expressi, K Systems GMBH Preferenza	K-Fee, Paulig Cupsolo, Mr. and Mrs. Mill (Krüger Group), Milky Moo (Krüger Group), formerly Starbucks (K-Fee was formerly rebranded as Starbucks Verismo in the United States)	United States, Europe, Australia	Capsule	Physically compatible with Caffitaly machines/pods
L'OR	JDE Peet's	?	Philips	L'OR, Peet's	Europe, Australia, Israel, Japan, New Zealand, South Africa, United States	Capsule	Compatible with L'OR coffee machines and Nespresso machines, with the exception of U, Umilk, Expert, Vertuo, Expert&Milk, Prodigio and Prodigio&Milk models bought after 25 July 2016.
Nespresso; OriginalLine	Nestle	1976	Breville Group, Eugster/Frismag branded as Krups, Magimix, Siemens; De' Longhi make Latissima model	Nespresso, Starbucks. Unauthorized clones exist.	Worldwide	Capsule (Pod in bars)	In 1976, Eric Favre, an employee of Nestlé, invented, patented, and introduced the Nespresso system Formerly a Nestle-controlled system until the patent expired, so unauthorized clones exist. Recyclable via ship back program and other methods. Capable of brewing smaller sized coffees such as espresso or lungo. Some machines add the ability to brew other sizes such as ristretto and/or caffè americano.
Nespresso Professional	Nestle	?		Nespresso, Starbucks.	Worldwide	Capsule	Nestle-controlled system. Different machines can brew different sizes of coffee drinks. All can brew ristretto, espresso, and lungo sizes. Some can brew Americano and/or large Americano sizes.
Nespresso VertuoLine	Nestle	2014	Breville Group, De' Longhi, Nespresso	Nespresso, Starbucks	United States, Canada, France, United Kingdom, Australia, Japan	Capsule	Nestle-controlled system. Recyclable via ship back program and other methods. Capable of brewing espressos, much larger coffees, and sizes in between. Uses a barcode under the capsule's ring to customize the brew to factory-designed brewing profiles.
Coffee Pods	None	2001 (Senseo patent)	Bunn, Philips, Melitta, Grindmaster, Cuisinart, CafeXpress, etc.	Douwe Egberts, Café Liégeois, Reunion Island, Wolfgang Puck, Melitta, Fratello Coffee Roasters, etc.	Worldwide	Pod	Not owned by a specific corporation. Many more manufacturers of pods and brewers exist. Also biodegradable.
T-Discs (Tassimo)	JDE Peet's	2004	Bosch branded as TASSIMO	JDE Peet's and Kraft Heinz (in Canada. Formerly United States)	Canada, Mexico, Europe. Fully withdrawn from United States. Brewing machines were withdrawn from sale in Canada, but T-Discs continue to be sold in Canada.	Capsule	—

== Environmental impact ==
Environmental activists have said that single-use coffee pods are harmful, as they are often composed of a mix of plastic, aluminium, and organic material (the used coffee) which makes them difficult to recycle. In early 2016 the German city of Hamburg banned coffee capsules from state-run buildings on environmental grounds. There are some capsules that are plant-based and that can be compostable as bio-waste.

== See also ==
- Coffee service
- Coffee wars
