= Dolce Gusto =

Espresso machine/coffee capsule system

Nescafé Dolce Gusto
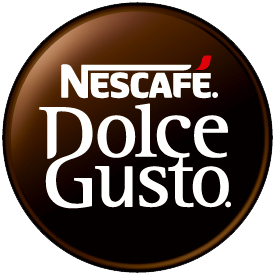

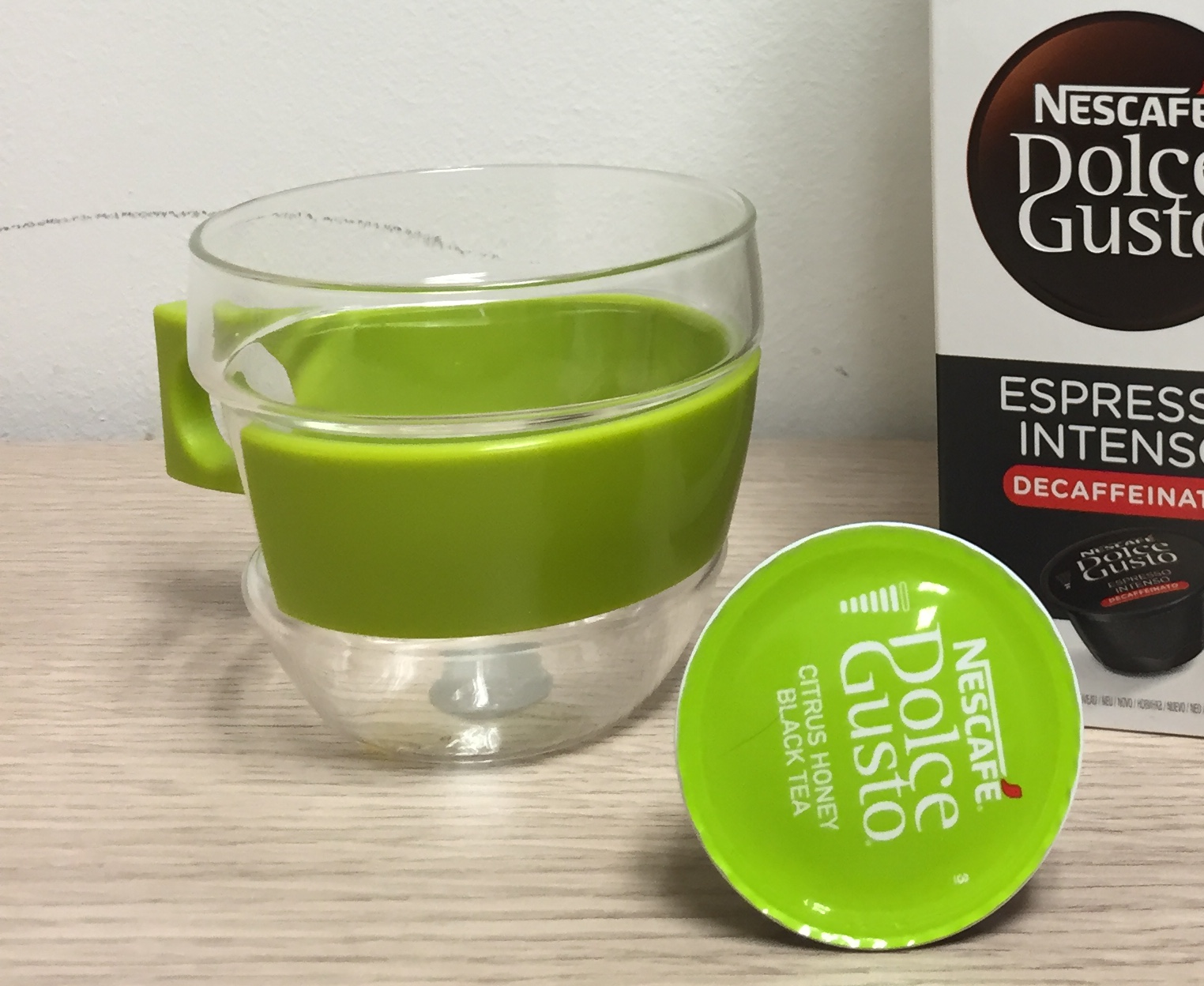
- Product type: Coffee machines, coffee capsules
- Current owner: Nestlé
- Produced by: Nestlé
- Country: Switzerland
- Website: dolce-gusto.com

The Nescafé Dolce Gusto is a coffee capsule system from Nestlé, launched in 2006. The machines are produced by either Krups or De'Longhi, depending on the machine.

== Devices ==
=== Melody series ===
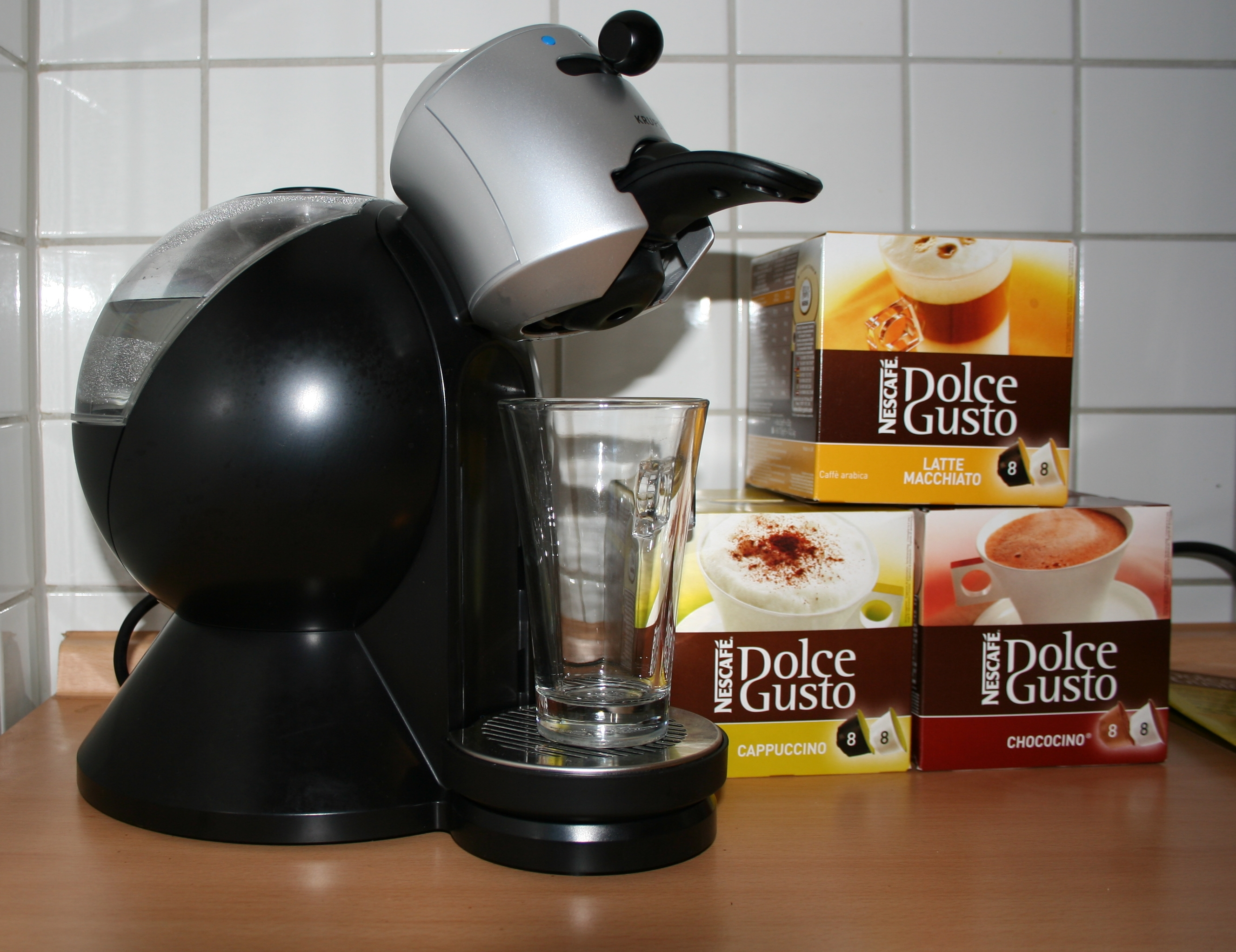
Dolce Gusto Coffee Machine (First Series KP20xx)

The first series of 2006 consisted of the models KP2000 (Black/Silver), KP2006 (Black/Silver/Red) and KP2002 (Black/Silver/White), all of them operating in a standard pressure of 14 bar. The device itself consists of a water tank, an internal water pump and an electric heater. The dispenser is in the top, where a lever lowers a plate with a single needle on the capsule holder.

The machines debuted a proprietary capsule system called smart capsule, that could prepare hot or cold beverages — the heating is done internally, but for cold beverages the water has to be manually chilled in the water tank with ice.

In late 2008, Nestlé launched a new series, KP21xx/Melody2, with new colors and some other improvements:

- 15 bar pressure (instead of 14)
- Power-saving automatic switch-off (after 5 min)
- Partially chromed parts
- Wider drip collector
- Magnetic capsule holder

Since September 2010 there is a new series, Creativa Melody2, that has an LCD. This allows the machine to be programmed and customized, for example, set it to automatically turn on in a given time and brew the capsule already in the holder. In addition, the outflow can be personalized, to obtain the same taste regardless of the cup used. There are pre-programmed settings to different capsule varieties, that can be further customized.

=== Circolo, Piccolo and Fontana ===
In mid-2009 Nestlé added the Circolo series to the line. This machine, as the name suggests, sports a rounded design, with the same technical specifications of the Melody2 devices, but with a LED light in the water tank.

In September 2010, the previous two series were supplemented by three more. Besides the Creativa mentioned above, there is the Piccolo (small, KP10xx), aimed to customers with limited space, as it is smaller, with a 600 ml water tank. Other than that, it is technically identical to the Melody2 machines.

Similarly, the Fontana (KP30xx) has the same underpinnings, but with a design reminiscent of a water tap (Italian Fontana).

The devices work, depending on the series, with 14 or 15 bars (200 or 220 psi) pressure.

=== Genio S ===
Nescafé Dolce Gusto launched the Genio S range of automatic coffee machines. The collection consists of the more compact Genio S, larger Genio S Plus and intuitive Genio S Touch which features a colour touch display. Genio S Plus and Genio S Touch models both benefit from Espresso Boost Technology for more intense and concentrated espressos. All models feature 15 bar pump pressure and XL functionality for drink customisation.

== Similar systems ==
In contrast to Nespresso system, which is also made by Nestlé and has Krups and De’Longhi as one of the major hardware vendors, the Dolce Gusto capsules are freely available in stores. Most Nespresso pods – except for "Starbucks by Nespresso" pods, available in most supermarkets – can only be bought online or in special Nespresso stores, although non-official, Nespresso-compatible pods are available from numerous retailers.

== Capsules ==
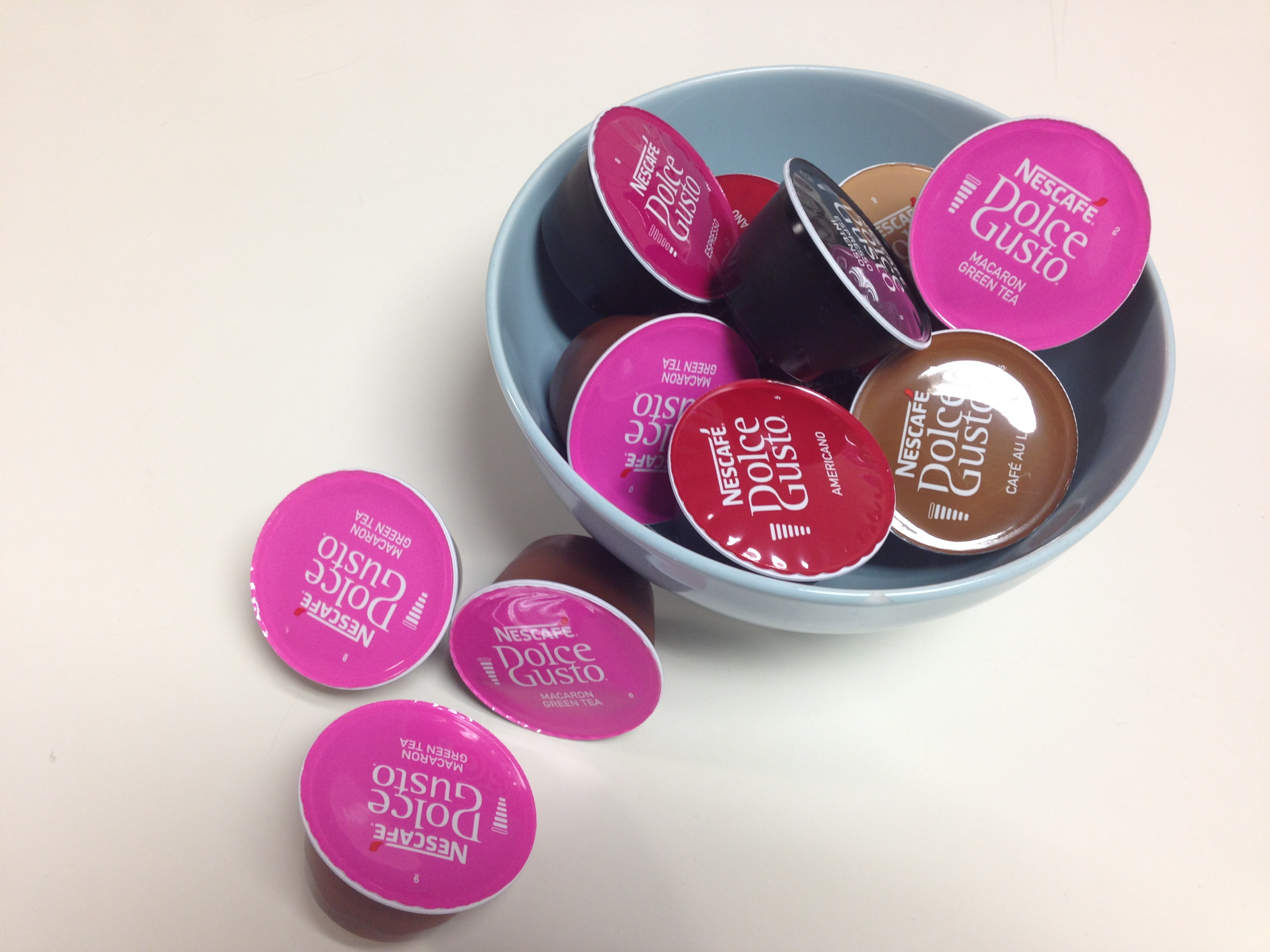
Dolce Gusto capsules

Nescafé Dolce Gusto coffee capsules come in a variety of pack sizes which contain 12, 16 or 30 capsules. 12 pod boxes can make between 6 and 12 cups and 30 pod boxes are sufficient for between 15 and 30 cups, depending on the type of beverage.

In almost all beverages with milk, two capsules are needed: one capsule with milk powder and other with the other ingredient (be it coffee, tea or chocolate). The amount of time of preparation for each one varies. There is also coffee and tea equipment.

=== Varieties ===
The variety of flavors varies by territory. The following list provides information on the varieties available as of November 2021, listed by territory (AE = UAE, AR = Argentina, AT = Austria, AU = Australia, BE = Belgium, BG = Bulgaria, BR = Brazil, CA = Canada, CH = Switzerland, CL = Chile, CN = China, CO = Colombia, CR = Costa Rica, CZ = Czech Republic, DE = Germany, DK = Denmark, DO = Dominican Republic, EC = Ecuador, EE = Estonia, ES = Spain, FI = Finland, FR = France, GR = Greece, GT = Guatemala, HK = Hong Kong, HN = Honduras, HR = Croatia, HU = Hungary, ID = Indonesia, IE = Ireland, IL = Israel, IT = Italy, JO = Jordan, JP = Japan, KR = South Korea, KW = Kuwait, KZ = Kazakhstan, LB = Lebanon, LT = Lithuania, LV = Latvia, MA = Morocco, MT = Malta, MX = Mexico, MY = Malaysia, NI = Nicaragua, NL = Netherlands, NO = Norway, NZ = New Zealand, PA = Panama, PE = Peru, PH = Philippines, PK = Pakistan, PL = Poland, PT = Portugal, PY = Paraguay, QA = Qatar, RO = Romania, RS = Serbia, RU = Russia, SA = Saudi Arabia, SE = Sweden, SG = Singapore, SI = Slovenia, SK = Slovakia, TH = Thailand, TR = Turkey, TW = Taiwan, UA = Ukraine, UK = United Kingdom, US = USA, UY = Uruguay, VE = Venezuela, VN = Vietnam, ZA = South Africa):

Name	Intensity	Main Water	Milk Water	Availability	Notes
Ristretto	8	1	-	AE, AR, AU, BE, BG, CH, CZ, DE, DK, ES, FI, FR, GR, HU, IE, IT, JO, KW, NL, NO, NZ, PL, PT, QA, RU, SA, SE, SK, TH, TW, UA, UK	
Ristretto Ardenza	11	1	-	AR, AT, AU, BE, BG, BR, CH, CL, CO, CZ, DE, DK, ES, FI, FR, GR, HR, HU, IE, IT, KR, MT, MY, NL, NO, PL, PT, RO, RS, RU, SE, SG, SK, TW, UK, ZA	
Espresso	5	2	-	AE, AR, AT, AU, BE, BG, BR, CA, CH, CZ, DE, DK, DO, EC, ES, FI, FR, HU, IE, IT, JO, JP, KR, KW, KZ, LB, MA, MX, MY, NI, NL, NO, NZ, PE, PH, PK, PL, PT, RO, RU, QA, SA, SE, SG, SK, UA, TH, TW, UK, US, UY	
Espresso Decaffeinato	5	2	-	AT, AU, BE, BG, BR, CH, CZ, DE, DK, ES, FI, FR, GR, HR, HU, IE, IT, KR, MT, MX, NI, NL, NO, NZ, PL, PT, RO, RU, SE, SK, HK, UA, UK	
(Espresso) Barista	9	1	-	AT, BE, BG, BR, CH, CZ, DE, DK, EE, ES, FI, FR, GR, HR, HU, IE, IL, IT, LT, LV, MT, MX, NI, NL, NO, PE, PL, PT, RO, RS, RU, SE, SK, UA, UK	
Bonka Espresso	8	1	-	ES	A coffee brand by Nestlé
(Espresso) Buondi	8	1	-	BG, CH, CZ, DE, GR, HU, IT, PT, SK, TH, UA	A coffee brand by Nestlé
Espresso Intenso	7	2	-	AT, AU, BE, BG, BR, CH, CL, CN, CO, CR, CZ, DE, DK, EC, EE, ES, FI, FR, GR, GT, HK, HN, HR, HU, ID, IE, IL, IT, JP, KR, LT, LV, MT, MX, MY, NI, NL, NO, NZ, PA, PL, PT, PY, RO, RS, RU, SE, SG, SI, TH, TR, TW, UA, UK, US, UY, VN, ZA	
Espresso Intenso Decaffeinato	7	2	-	DE, ES, IT	
Espresso Macchiato (Cortado)	-	3	-	AR, AT, BE, BG, BR, CH, CL, CO, CZ, DE, DK, EE, ES, FI, FR, GR, HR, HU, IE, IT, KZ, LT, LV, MT, MX, MY, NI, NL, NO, PL, PT, RO, RS, RU, SE, SG, SK, UK, UY	
Espresso Macchiato (Cortado) Decaffeinato	-	3	-	AT, DE, DK, ES, FI, FR, GR, HU, IE, IT, NL, NO, PL, RO, SE, UK	
Espresso Caramel	7	2	-	AT, BE, CH, CL, CZ, DE, DK, EE, ES, FI, FR, GR, HU, IT, KR, LT, LV, NL, NO, PL, PT, RU, SE, SK, TW, UK, UY	
Yunnan Espresso	7	2	-	AT, BE, CH, CR, CZ, DK, ES, FI, FR, GT, HN, IT, NL, NO, PA, PL, PT, RU, SE, SK	Limited edition FINISH
Dallmayr Crema D'Oro	7	5	-	AT, DE, DK, FI, NO, SE	
Dallmayr Prodomo	5	5	-	AT, CH, DE, DK, FI, NO, SE	
Sical	7	1	-	IT, PT	A coffee brand by Nestlé
(Caffè) Americano / House Blend	4	7	-	AR, AU, BE, CA, CL, CO, CR, CZ, DK, EC, FI, FR, GR, GT, HN, IE, IT, KR, KZ, MX, NI, NO, NZ, PA, PL, RU, SE, SK, TH, TR, TW, UK, US, UY, VE, ZA	
Americano Intenso	6	7	-	EC, KR, UK	Worldwide exclusive launch
Caffè Buongiorno / Matinal	9	4	-	BR	Traditional Brazilian coffee
(Caffè) Lungo / Regular Blend	6	4	-	AR, AT, AU, BE, BG, BR, CA, CH, CL, CN, CZ, DE, DK, DO, EE, ES, FI, FR, GR, HK, HR, HU, ID, IE, IT, JP, KR, KZ, LT, LV, MA, MX, MY, NI, NL, NO, NZ, PE, PH, PL, PT, PY, RO, RS, RU, SE, SG, SI, SK, TH, TR, TW, UA, UK, US, UY	
(Caffè) Lungo Decaffeinato / Regular Blend Decaffeinato	6	4	-	AT, BE, CA, CH, CL, DE, DK, ES, FI, FR, GR, IE, IT, JP, KR, MX, NI, NL, NO, RO, SE, TW, UK, US, ZA	
(Caffè) Lungo Intenso / Roast Blend	9	4	-	AT, BE, BG, CZ, DE, DK, FI, FR, IE, IT, JP, KR, MX, NI, NL, NO, PL, RO, SE, SK, TW, UK	
(Caffè) Lungo Mild	3	4	-	AT, BE, BG, CH, DE, DK, FI, IE, JP, NL, NO, PL, RO, SE, UK	
(Caffè) N'Yumba Lungo	7	4	-	AT, BE, BG, CH, CZ, DK, FI, IE, IT, KR, MT, NL, NO, PL, PT, SE, SG, SK, UK	100% Rwandan arabica. Limited edition. FINISH
(Caffè Crema) Grande / Medium Roast /Caffè Aroma	5	7	-	AT, BE, BG, CA, CH, CZ, DE, DK, EC, EE, FI, FR, GR, HU, IE, IT, LT, LV, MT, MX, NI, NL, NO, PL, PT, RU, SE, SK, TW, UA, UK	
(Caffè) Grande Intenso / Dark Roast	9	7	-	BE, CA, CH, CZ, DE, DK, EE, ES, HK, FI, FR, GR, ID, IE, IL, IT, KR, LT, LV, MT, MY, NL, NO, PE, PH, PL, RU, SE, SG, SK, TW, UA, UK, US, VN	
(Caffè) Grande Mild / Morning Blend	3	7	-	AT, BE, CH, DE, DK, FI, IE, IT, JP, KR, NL, NO, SE, UK, US	
Zoégas Dark Temptation	7	6	-	DK, FI, NO, SE	A Swedish company acquired by Nestlé. A high percentage of the beans are from Kenya's highlands. FINISH
Zoégas Intenzo	8	6	-	DK, FI, NO, SE	Consists primarily of selected beans from Central America's hillsides. FINISH
Zoégas Skånerost	6	6	-	DK, FI, NO, SE	100% Arabica. East Africa, Brazil and highlands in Central America beans blend.
Iced Coffee Blend	-	3	-	JP, KR	Iced
Café Au Lait	-	6	-	AR, AT, AU, BE, BR, CH, CZ, CL, DE, DK, DO, EC, EE, ES, FI, FR, GR, HK, HR, ID, IE, IL, IT, KR, LT, LV, MA, MX, MY, NI, NL, NO, NZ, PL, PT, PY, RO, RU, SE, SG, SK, TH, UA, UK, UY, VN, ZA	
Café Au Lait Decaffeinato	-	6	-	ES	
Latte Macchiato	-	2	5	AE, AR, AT, AU, BE, BR, CA, CH, CL, CN, CO, CR, CZ, DE, DK, DO, EE, ES, FI, FR, GR, GT, ID, HN, HR, HU, IE, IT, JP, KR, LT, LV, MT, MX, MY, NI, NL, NO, NZ, PA, PE, PK, PL, PT, PY, RS, RO, RU, SE, SG, SI, SK, TH, TR, TW, UA, UK, US, VE, ZA	
Latte Macchiato Light	-	2	5	AR, AT, BG, CH, CO, CZ, DE, DK, ES, FI, FR, HU, IE, IT, HK, NL, NO, NZ, PE, SE, SK, UK, US, UY	
Latte Macchiato Unsweetened	-	2	5	AT, CH, CL, CZ, DE, DK, FI, GR, HU, IE, KZ, NL, NO, PL, RO, SE, SK, TW, UK, UY	
Latte Macchiato Caramel	-	2	5	AE, AT, AU, BE, BG, BR, CA, CH, CL, CZ, DE, DK, EC, EE, ES, FI, FR, GR, HU, ID, IE, IT, JO, KR, KW, LT, LV, MA, MT, MX, MY, NI, NL, NO, NZ, PE, PL, PT, QA, RO, RU, SA, SE, SG, SK, TR, TW, UA, UK, US, ZA	
Latte Macchiato Vanilla	-	2	5	AR, AT, BE, BR, CA, CH, CL, CZ, DE, DK, EC, ES, FI, FR, GR, HU, IE, IT, MT, MX, MY, NI, NL, NO, PH, PL, RO, RU, SE, SG, SI, SK, TW, UK, US, UY, ZA	
Ricoré Latte	-	6	-	FR	A brand name of a coffee/chicory mix by Nestlé.
Cappuccino	-	1	6	AE, AR, AT, AU, BE, BG, BR, CA, CH, CL, CN, CO, CR, CZ, DE, DK, DO, EC, EE, ES, FI, FR, GR, GT, HK, HN, HR, HU, ID, IE, IL, IT, JO, JP, KR, KW, KZ, LB, LT, LV, MA, MT, MX, MY, NI, NL, NO, NZ, PA, PE, PH, PK, PL, PT, PY, QA, RO, RU, SI, RS, SA, SE, SG, SK, TH, TR, TW, UA, UK, US, UY, VE, VN, ZA	
Soy Cappuccino	-	2	?	BR, DE, DK, FI, NO, PT, SE	Soy milk
Cappuccino Light	-	1	6	AU, BE, CH, CL, CO, CR, CZ, DE, DK, ES, FI, FR, GT, HK, HN, IE, IT, KR, MT, MX, NI, NL, NO, PA, PY, RO, RU, SE, SK, UK, US, ZA	
Cappuccino Ice	-	3	3	AE, AT, BE, BG, CH, CO, CR, CZ, DE, DK, ES, FI, GR, GT, HK, HN, HU, IE, IT, JO, JP, KR, KW, LB, MT, MX, NI, NL, NO, PA, PH, PL, PT, QA, RU, SA, SE, SI, SK, TH, TR, UA, UK, US, ZA	Iced
Freddo Cappuccino	-	3	3	DE, DK, FI, GR, NO, RO, SE, SG, TW	Iced FINISH
Chococino / Chocoletto	-	3	3	AE, AR, AT, AU, BE, BG, BR, CA, CH, CL, CN, CO, CR, CZ, DE, DK, EC, EE, ES, FI, FR, GR, GT, HK, HN, HR, HU, ID, IE, IL, IT, JO, JP, KR, KW, LB, LT, LV, MA, MT, MX, MY, NI, NL, NO, NZ, PA, PE, PH, PK, PL, PT, PY, QA, RO, RU, SA, SE, SG, SI, SK, TR, TW, UA, UK, US, UY, VN, ZA	Hot chocolate
Chococino Caramel	-	3	3	AR, AT, BE, BR, CH, CZ, CL, DE, DK, EE, ES, FI, FR, GR. HU, IE, IT, LT, LV, MA, MX, NI, NL, NO, PL, PT, RU, SE, SK, TW, UK, UY	Hot chocolate
Mocha	-	3	3	AE, AR, AT, AU, BE, BG, BR, CH, CL, CO, CR, CZ, DE, DK, DO, EC, ES, FI, FR, GR, GT, HK, HN, HU, ID, IE, IT, KR, KZ, MT, MX, MY, NI, NL, NO, NZ, PA, PE, PH, PL, PT, RO, RU, SE, SG, SI, SK, TH, TW, UA, UK, US, UY, VE, ZA	
Milo	-	3	3	CO, ID, MY, PE, PH, SG, ZA	A brand name of chocolate malt drink by Nestlé. FINISH
Nescau	-	4	-	BR	Hot chocolate. A cocoa brand by Nestlé
Nesquik	-	5	-	AT, BE, BG, CH, CO, CZ, DE, DK, DO, EC, EE, ES, FI, FR, GR, IT, KR, KZ, LT, LV, MT, MX, NL, NO, PL, PT, RO, RU, SE, SI, SK, UA	Hot chocolate. A cocoa brand by Nestlé. Different drink as Nescau/Nescao
Nestea Lemon (Iced Tea)	-	7	-	AR, BE, BR, CH, CZ, DE, DK, ES, FI, FR, GR, HU, IE, IT, NL, NO, PL, PT, SE, SK, UK, UY	Iced. An ice tea brand by Nestlé
Nestea Peach (Iced Tea)	-	7	-	AE, AT, AU, BE, BG, BR, CH, DK, ES, FI, FR, GR, HK, ID, IE, IT, KR, MT, NL, NO, NZ, PL, PT, RO, SE, SG, TW, UA, UK, US, ZA	Iced
Citrus Honey Black Tea	-	6	-	BE, CH, DE, DK, ES, FI, FR, IT, NL, NO, PL, PT, SE	
Macaron Green Tea	-	6	-	BE, CH, DE, DK, ES, FI, FR, HU, IT, NL, NO, PL, PT, SE, TH	
Uji Matcha	-	3	-	JP	Uji green tea
Marrakesh Style Tea	-	6	-	AE, AT, BE, BR, CH, CL, CO, CR, CZ, DE, DK, DO, EC, ES, FI, FR, GR, GT, HN, IE, IT, JO, KW, MT, MX, NI, NL, NO, PA, PT, RO, SE, SK, QA, SA, UK	
Tea Latte	-	3	3	AT, BE, CH, CN, DE, DK, ES, FI, FR, HK, IE, IT, JP, KR, MT, MY, NL, NO, SE, SG, TW, UK, ZA	
Chai Tea Latte	-	3	3	AE, AR, AT, AU, BE, BG, BR, CA, CH, CL, CO, CR, CZ, DE, DK, DO, EC, ES, FI, FR, GR, GT, HN, HU, IE, IT, JO, JP, KW, KZ, MT, MX, MY, NI, NL, NO, NZ, PA, PE, QA, RO, RU, SA, SE, SG, SK, TR, TW, UA, UK, US, UY, ZA	
Preludio	-				
Preludio Intenso	-			CL	
Essenza Di Moka	-			CL	
Catuài Do Cerrado / Espresso Do Brazil	-			PE	FINISH
Café Au Lait Décaffeinated	-				
Café Au Lait Intenso	-			EC	
Lungo Colombia Sierra Nevada Bio	-			BE, ES, FR	
Espresso Péru Cajamarca Bio	-			BE, CL, ES, FR	
Espresso Honduras Bio	-			BE, CL, ES, FR	
Koi Matcha	-			JP	
Cappuccino Intenso	-			BE, DE, PT	
Espresso Generoso	-			FR, BE, DE	
Flat White	-			AU, NZ	
Mochaccino Canela	-			BR	
Incarom Latte	-			CH	
Americano Rich Aroma	-			KR	
Café Au Lait Mild- Rich Aroma	-			JP, TH	
Milk Tea	-			JP	1 Pod. Different from Tea Latte 2 Pods
Americano Chiapas Mexico Bio	-			MX	
Espresso Napoli (Ristretto Napoli Style)	-			BE, BG, IT, PT	
Espresso Milano	-			IT	
Espresso Roma	-			IT	
Latte Macchiato Amaretto	-			UK, DE	
Caffé Ginseng	-			IT, CH, PT	
Latte Macchiato Guatemala Bio	-			FR	
Cold Brew Coffee	-	6		DE, JP, UK	
Iced Café au lait	-			JP	
Americano Smooth Morning	4	XL		UK	
Americano Bold Morning	8	XL		UK	
Café Con Leche Délicato	5			ES	
STARBUCKS® TOFFEE NUT LATTE LIMITED EDITION				SG	
RICORÉ® Original				FR	
Coconut Caffè Latte	5			FR, DE, PT	
Almond Caffè Latte	5			FR, DE, PT	
Oat Caffè Latte	5			DE, BE, PT	
DALLMAYR CREMA D’ORO CAFFÈ LATTE				DE	
DALLMAYR CREMA D’ORO INTENSA				DE	
GUATEMALA ESPRESSO	10			CH	
ZOÉGAS CAPPUCCINO				DK, FI, NO, SE	
ZOÉGAS ESPRESSO	11			DK, FI, NO, SE	
ZOÉGAS MORGONSTUND	9			DK, FI, NO, SE	
ZOÉGAS MOLLBERGS BLANDING	7			DK, FI, NO, SE	
CHOCOCINO ALPINO				BR	
ESPRESSO PALERMO	10			FR	
DOPPIO ESPRESSO	10	3		BE, KR	
CAFÉ AU LAIT VANILLA		5		BR	
CHERRY BLOSSOM STRAWBERRY LATTE				TW	
Starbucks Iced Americano					
CAFÉ AU LAIT VANILLA				BR	
BUONDI INTENSO				PT	

== Recycling ==
Nestlé and Jacobs Douwe Egberts UK have joined their forces to create Podback, a first of its kind recycling programme for coffee pods. The scheme is set to launch in early 2021 and cover brands including Nespresso, Nescafé Dolce Gusto and Tassimo, with the aim of expanding the programme to eventually include all of the UK's coffee pods made from plastic or aluminium.

Podback allows for three different recycling options including: Collect+, Kerbside collection – Exeter City Council, Cheltenham Borough Council and South Derbyshire District Council are currently in discussions with Podback to become the first confirmed partners, the aim is for more local authorities to welcome the scheme in the future – and retailer ‘handover at home’, allowing consumers to hand their coffee pods back for recycling when they get their groceries delivered.

== Criticism ==
The pod and coffee capsule system draw some criticism due to the lock-in effect. This means that the low cost of acquisition for each coffee machine is illusory, since the costs of the capsules for it exceed that of conventional coffee — sometimes several times — and can cost more than the machine itself in a short time span unless a refillable capsule is used. A further disadvantage is the increased amount of waste due to the disposable nature of the Nescafé capsules, although in some countries recycling programs exist.

A trial recycling scheme has been operating in the UK during 2019 but has drawn criticism in social media channels. The scheme is only limited to purchases done from the Online Dolce Gusto shop, through receipt of a special pink 'return' bag'. High Street purchases, on any other official Dolce Gusto purchase through other online retailers are also excluded.

== See also ==
- Single-serve coffee container
