= Dualit =

British kitchen appliance manufacturer

Dualit Limited

- A four-slice Dualit toaster
- Company type: Private company
- Industry: Kitchen appliances
- Founded: 1946
- Founder: Max Gort-Barten
- Headquarters: Crawley, West Sussex, England
- Total assets: £8,617,059 30 June 2012
- Website: dualit.com

Dualit is a British manufacturer of kitchen and catering equipment, and coffee and tea capsules. It is known for its range of heavy-duty toasters. It was primarily designed for the commercial catering market, its domestic usage increased during the 1990s

== Origins ==
Dualit was founded in 1945 by the German-born inventor Max Gort-Barten CBE (1914–2003) and was incorporated as Dualit Ltd in 1948. Max's first commercial product was an electric heater which he named Dual-Lite (from which the company took its name) as it could deflect heat to two parts of a room.

In 1952 Max designed a commercial six-slot toaster with a manual eject lever in his factory in Camberwell, southeast London. In 1954 the Government compulsorily purchased the factory and gave Max money to build a new factory in Bermondsey, off the Old Kent Road. Other products followed and demand rose. Eventually, their London base was too small for them and in 2003 the company moved to its present site in Crawley, West Sussex. They occupy 5,570 square metres (60,000 sq ft) with further expansion planned.

Max's son Leslie joined the company in 1972 and is now managing director. Leslie is a trained engineer and worked making metal press tools before joining Dualit. Leslie's son Alex is now a company director, having trained in product design. Before coming to Dualit, he worked as a product designer in both London and Hong Kong.

== Mica and the ProHeat element ==
Since Max Gort-Barten's first commercial toaster in 1952, Dualit's toaster elements have been made using a heating wire wound repeatedly around a Mica supporting substrate. Mica is a naturally occurring silicate compound. It is inert and also can be naturally separated into flat sheets. As a result, it is suited to the manufacture of heating elements. Mica varies in grade. The clearer the Mica, the fewer impurities it contains. Dualit engineers their elements out of the highest grade Mica which is critical for the performance of the toaster; if there are no impurities then there are no hotspots where the heat conducting wire comes into contact with the supporting silicate substrate. Hotspots diminish longevity and cause uneven toasting. Despite this, the Dualit elements could still be damaged by consumers sticking knives and other implements into the toaster slots and damaging them. Dualit worked on a solution to this and in 1999 patented the ProHeat element, which won the company a Millennium Award.

It is similar to previous Dualit elements but has two differences; the first is that it has more "winds per square centimeter" – the heating wire was wound around the mica substrate a greater number of times resulting in much improved toasting ability. The second and most crucial difference is the entire element is coated in a very thin, protective layer of mica, which allows the heat to escape but blocks injurious ingress from the knife. ProHeat elements are currently fitted to every Dualit Classic Toaster, with replacement elements available to be purchased if required.

== Expanding the range ==
In the 1960s, Dualit began to develop different products to add to its portfolio. Still manufacturing for the commercial market, this began with the introduction of a waffle iron and continued to include sandwich toasters, soup kettles and cocktail shakers. The 1970s saw Dualit Toasters start to become more popular in domestic kitchens, but it wasn't until the 1980s that demand in this area soared. Dualit diversified its product range to include kitchen appliances such as blenders, juicers and non-kitchen products like pedestal fans and hand dryers. Dualit still produce a comprehensive range of catering products, together with several toaster and kettle collections, a food preparation range and coffee and tea machines. Their latest development has been producing their own range of beverage capsules for coffee machines. In 2020, the company worked with Hotel Chocolat to create the Velvetiser, a hot chocolate making machine.

== Coffee and tea capsules ==
Launched in 2012, Dualit's first range of coffee capsules were branded NX Coffee Caps. The patented capsules were designed to be compatible with Nestle's Nespresso coffee capsule machine range as well as Dualit's own coffee machines. Nestle sued Dualit in 2013 in an attempt to block production of the compatible capsules claiming patent infringement, but the court awarded in favour of Dualit. Dualit currently sells two coffee capsule ranges: NX coffee capsules and compostable coffee capsules. In 2014, Dualit launched a range of multi-patented tea capsules.

=== NX ===
- Intense Espresso (Strength: 10 – Dark)
- Classic Espresso (Strength: 9 – Dark)
- Lungo Americano (Strength: 7 – Medium)
- Decaf Espresso (Strength: 3 – Light)

=== Compostable coffee ===
- Single Origin Indian Monsoon (Strength: 9 – Dark)
- Single Origin Sumatra Mandheling (Strength: 8 – Dark)

=== Fine tea ===
- English Breakfast
- Earl Grey
- Green Tea
- Blackcurrant Infusion
- Peppermint Infusion

== Awards ==
Dualit products have won awards from organisations and publications such as the Good Housekeeping Institute.

- Excellence in Housewares 'Honorary Achievement' Award, 2015, Leslie Gort-Barten, managing director
- Excellence in Housewares 'Plugged In' Award, 2015, Classic Toaster and Kettle in Copper
- Great Taste Award, 2015, Fine Tea Peppermint Infusion and Green Tea Capsules
- Good Housekeeping, Approved Award 2015, Classic Toaster
- Excellence in Housewares 'Plugged In' Award, 2013, Architect Kettle and Toaster
- Good Housekeeping 'Design Superstar' Award, 2008, Classic Toaster

== See also ==
- Small appliance
- Home appliance
