= SICAL =

Portuguese coffee brand company

- Type: Food and Drink
- Industry: Food and Beverage
- Founded: Portugal, 1947
- Headquarters: Vevey, Switzerland
- Area served: Europe
- Products: Food; Beverage
- Production output: Portugal
- Services: Food
- Parent: Nestlé
- Website: www.sical.pt

SICAL is a Portuguese coffee brand company under the Nestlé portfolio since 1987.
