= Ogden Nature Center =

Nature preserve in Utah

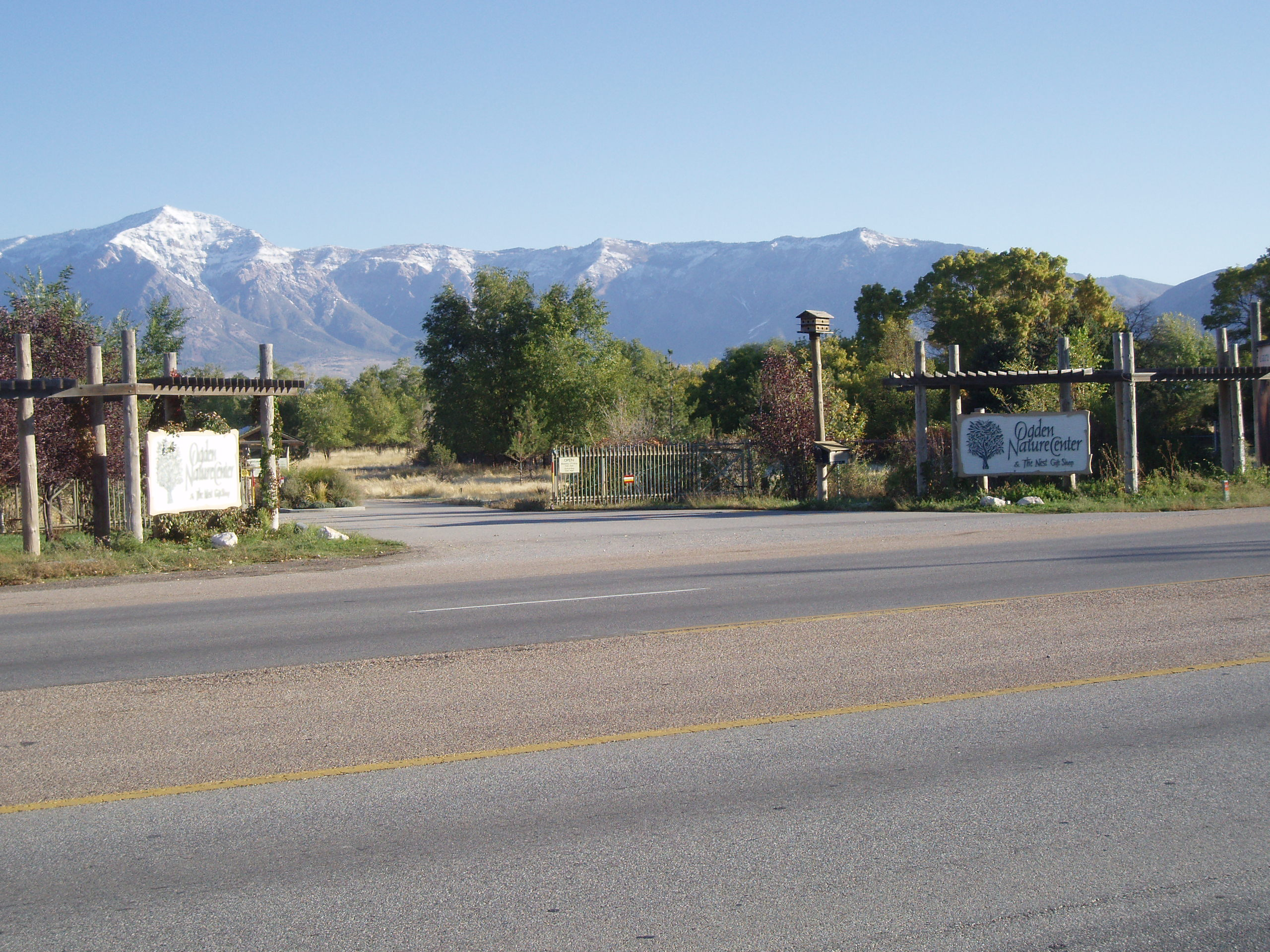
- Entrance to the center
- Founded: 1975
- Coordinates: 41°14′41″N 112°00′13″W

The Ogden Nature Center is a 152-acre (0.62 km^{2}) nature preserve and education center located in Ogden, Utah. Created in 1975, it was Utah's first nature center.

== About ==
The center includes live animal exhibits, walking trails, ponds, bird blinds, observation towers, treehouses, gardens featuring drought resistant plants, and protected areas for wildlife. It offers nature-based classes and activities for children and adults, as well as classes on environmental issues.

The award-winning Visitor Center was finished in 1995, and constructed using reclaimed redwood from Union Pacific Railroad's Lucin Cutoff trestle that once crossed the Great Salt Lake. The architect was Bob Herman, then with Sanders Herman Architects. In 2004, the center added a 6,000-square-foot (560 m^{2}) education building, constructed on green building principles and insulated with recycled materials. Bob Herman now with EDA (Edward Daniels Architects) also designed this award winning building.

Children enjoy the nature themed playscape located north of the Visitor center. It features a climbable bear cub statue, a water play feature and sand pit, a large mound with slide, as well as other climbing features.

Large treehouses, a hammock garden, and covered pavilion are featured in the newly renovated picnic grove at the north end of the 152 acre nature preserve.

Bronze sculptures by Ogden artist, Terry Johnson, can be found near and around the Visitor Center.

In 2018, artist Jane Kim painted three murals at the Ogden Nature Center featuring images of monarch butterflies as part of her Migrating Mural series to bring attention to declining species.
