= Utah Division of Juvenile Justice Services =

U.S. state government division

Headquarters of the Division of Juvenile Justice Services

The Utah Division of Juvenile Justice Services (JJS) is a division of the Utah Department of Human Services operating juvenile correctional services. Its headquarters is in Salt Lake City.

The division was established in 1981 as the Utah Division of Youth Corrections. It received its current name on July 1, 2004.

== Facilities ==
Secure facilities:

- Decker Lake Youth Center (West Valley City)
- Farmington Bay Youth Center (Farmington)
- Mill Creek Youth Center (Ogden)
- Slate Canyon Youth Center (Provo)
- South West Utah Youth Center (Cedar City)
- Wasatch Youth Center (Unincorporated Salt Lake County, near Salt Lake City)
- Split Mountain Youth Center (Vernal)
