= Lavazza =

Italian coffee company

Coordinates: 45.0805934°N 7.6924621°E

Luigi Lavazza S.p.A.

- Headquarters in Turin, Italy
- Type: Private
- Industry: Retail coffee
- Founded: 1895; 131 years ago Turin, Italy
- Founder: Luigi Lavazza
- Headquarters: Turin, Italy
- Key people: Giuseppe Lavazza (president); Antonio Baravalle (CEO)
- Products: Whole bean coffee Merchandise
- Revenue: 1,473,000,000 (2015)
- Net income: 92,000,000 (2025)
- Number of employees: 3,800 (2018)
- Website: lavazza.com

Luigi Lavazza S.p.A. (Italian: [luˈiːdʒi laˈvattsa]), shortened and stylized as LAVAZZA, is an Italian manufacturer of coffee products. Founded in Turin in 1895 by Luigi Lavazza, it was initially run from a small grocery store at Via San Tommaso 10. The business (Italian: S.p.A.) is currently administered by the third and fourth generations of the Lavazza family.

== Coffee ==
Lavazza imports coffee from around the world, including Brazil, Colombia, Guatemala, Costa Rica, Honduras, Uganda, Indonesia, the United States and Mexico.

Branded as "Italy's Favourite Coffee," the company claims that 16 million out of the 20 million coffee-purchasing families in Italy choose Lavazza. Among its offerings today are products such as Qualità Oro, Qualità Rossa, Club, Espresso Italiano, Espresso Barista Perfetto, Caffè Crema, Gran Aroma, Super Crema, Gran Crema, Crema e Gusto, Crema e Aroma, Top Class, Grand'Espresso, Dek (decaffeinated) and coffee capsules A Modo Mio, "Espresso Point" and Lavazza Blue. Lavazza also produces Nespresso Compatible Capsules (NCC).

== Fairtrade ==
Only one out of ten Lavazza production companies have the fairtrade certification according to their 2020 sustainability report.

== Retail ==
The company operates a number of retail coffee shops ("Il Caffè di Roma" and "Espression"). The shops offer traditional coffee drinks as well as whole bean and ground coffee for home use.

== Company ==
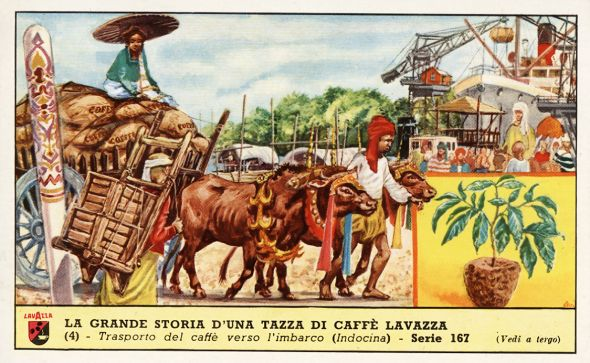
Advertising for Lavazza: Transport of coffee in Indochina

Lavazza, established in Turin, Italy, in 1895, has been owned by the family of the same name for four generations. The world's seventh-ranking coffee roaster, Lavazza has a market share by sales of over 36% in Italy, 3,800 employees and revenue of €2.24 billion (2019). In 2024 the group reported revenue of €3.35 billion, up 9.1% on 2023. The company has six production sites, three in Italy and three abroad, and operates through associated companies and distributors in more than 90 countries. Lavazza exports 46% of its production. Lavazza credits itself with inventing the concept of blending, "the art of combining different types of coffee from different geographical areas", in its early years and claims this as a distinctive feature of all its products.

Lavazza acquired the Carte Noire and Merrild brands from Jacobs Douwe Egberts in February 2016.

Lavazza purchased an 80% stake in Canadian-based Kicking Horse Coffee in May 2017.

Lavazza bought the drinks division of Mars UK in 2018 for $650m.

In 2019, with PepsiCo, Lavazza launched canned ready-to-drink cappuccino in Europe.

A lawsuit was filed in 2019 alleging Lavazza brought false intellectual property lawsuits against American resellers on Amazon.com in an attempt to prevent them from reselling products.

In November 2022, it was announced Lavazza had acquired the French coffee roaster, distributor and services supplier, MaxiCoffee.

== Sponsorship ==
Lavazza became a sponsor of Liverpool F.C. in 2018. and the Williams Racing team in Formula One, as they are a personal sponsor with Canadian Nicholas Latifi. Also through the agreement reached in September 2020, Lavazza became the official coffee brand used by Juventus FC.

== Offices and manufacturing plants ==
"Luigi Lavazza S.p.A." is present in over 90 countries with more than 20 offices and manufacturing plants in Italy and the rest of the world. In Turin, in Via Bologna, was recently inaugurated "Nuvola", the new Lavazza Headquarters. The "Nuvola" project is the work of Cino Zucchi Architetti and is at the heart of the recent qualification of the Aurora district. In addition to Turin, Luigi Lavazza S.p.A. has 12 other European offices and is also present in the United States, Australia, South America, India (with two locations) and Morocco.

Currently, the Lavazza Group includes 21 companies and international offices, including the Turinese Headquarter "Nuvola" and San Tommaso 10, the same old store in Via San Tommaso owned by Luigi Lavazza in late 1800.

Country	City	Legal Name
Italy	Turin	LUIGI LAVAZZA S.p.A.
Argentina	Buenos Aires	Lavazza Argentina S.A.
Australia	Melbourne	Lavazza Australia Pty Ltd.
Austria	Wien	Lavazza Kaffee GmbH
Brazil	Rio de Janeiro	Lavazza do Brasil Ind. E Com. Ltda
Bulgaria	Sofia	Onda Coffee Break AD
Denmark	Fredericia	Lavazza Denmark
France	Noisy Le Grand - Cedex	Lavazza France S.A.S.
Germany	Frankfurt	Luigi Lavazza Deutschland GmbH
India	Chennai	Fresh & Honest Cafe Ltd.
India	New Delhi	Barista Coffee Company Limited
Italy	Turin	Cofincaf
Italy	Segrate (Milan)	Ercom SPA
Italy	Turin	San Tommaso 10
Morocco	Casablanca	Lavazza Maroc (SARLAU)
Netherlands	Oostzaan	Bluespresso B.V.
Nepal	Pokhara	Coffee Culture Cafe Pvt Ltd
Portugal	Porto Salvo	Sogefran S.A.
Spain	Barcelona	LAVAZZA ESPAÑA
Sweden	Stockholm	Lavazza Sweden AB
United Kingdom	Uxbridge	Lavazza Coffee (UK) Ltd.
United States	New York	Lavazza Premium Coffees Corp.

The Lavazza Group has three main manufacturing plants in Italy: Turin, the first historical manufacturing plant; Gattinara, where Lavazza A Modo Mio, Lavazza Espresso Point and Lavazza Blue capsules are produced; and in Pozzilli where decaffeinated coffee is made for worldwide distribution. Other manufacturing plants are located in France, India, and Brazil.

Country	City
Italy	Turin
Italy	Pozzilli (Isernia)
Italy	Gattinara (Vercelli)
France	Lavérune

== Calendar ==
Since 1991, Lavazza has produced the "Lavazza Calendar", featuring fashion photography from some of the world's leading photographers. Contributors have included Annie Leibovitz in 2009, David LaChapelle in 2002, Helmut Newton in 1993 and 1994, Ellen Von Unwerth in 1995, Eugenio Recuenco in 2007, Erwin Olaf in 2005, and Platon in 2018. The calendar has become a showpiece of conceptual fashion photography.

== See also ==
- Single-serve coffee container
- List of Italian companies
