= Luigi Lavazza =

Italian businessman

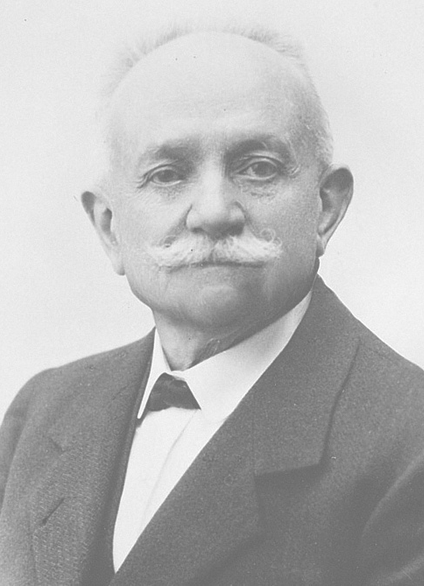
Lavazza

Luigi Lavazza (Italian pronunciation: [luˈiːdʒi laˈvattsa]; 24 April 1859 – 16 August 1949) was an Italian businessman. In 1895, he founded the Lavazza coffee company in Turin.

== Biography ==
Lavazza was born in Murisengo, a small town in the province of Alessandria (Piedmont).

The origins of the Lavazza firm go back to 1895, when Luigi Lavazza purchased a little grocery store, Paissa Olivero, in the old commercial section of Turin (Northern Italy). The purchase was made for 26,000 Italian Lire, or about US$20.

In those times such stores operated as both retail and production outlets. The coffee, sold of other products, was bought raw, and then roasted and blended according to very personal recipes depending on the customers' requests. This activity soon attracted the interest of Luigi Lavazza, who had already demonstrated considerable knowledge and skills in the processing of blends, including both the quantities of the ingredients and the degree of roasting. The firm's expansion from retailing to wholesale trade (1910), the joining of Luigi's three sons Mario, Beppe and Pericle (during the First World War), and the progressive narrowing of the production range marked the first steps of an irresistible commercial growth, which enabled the company to acquire a notable position at regional level. The little grocery store became, in 1927, the modern Luigi Lavazza S.p.A. that, after the forced stop caused by the League of Nations' economic sanctions, by the prohibition on the importation of coffee, and by the outbreak of the Second World War, finally came to specialize in the production of coffee. The first Lavazza logo was then created, and the annual production reached 1,000 tons.

In 1936 Luigi Lavazza retired and left the company to his children. He died in 1949.

Since his death his family, from generation to generation, has devoted its energy to coffee and today Lavazza is claimed to be the market leader of espresso in Italy (with almost 45% of the total coffee market in 2004) and is present in over 60 countries. It is still based in Turin and is controlled by the fourth generation of Lavazza's descendants.
