= Douwe Egberts =

Dutch coffee brand

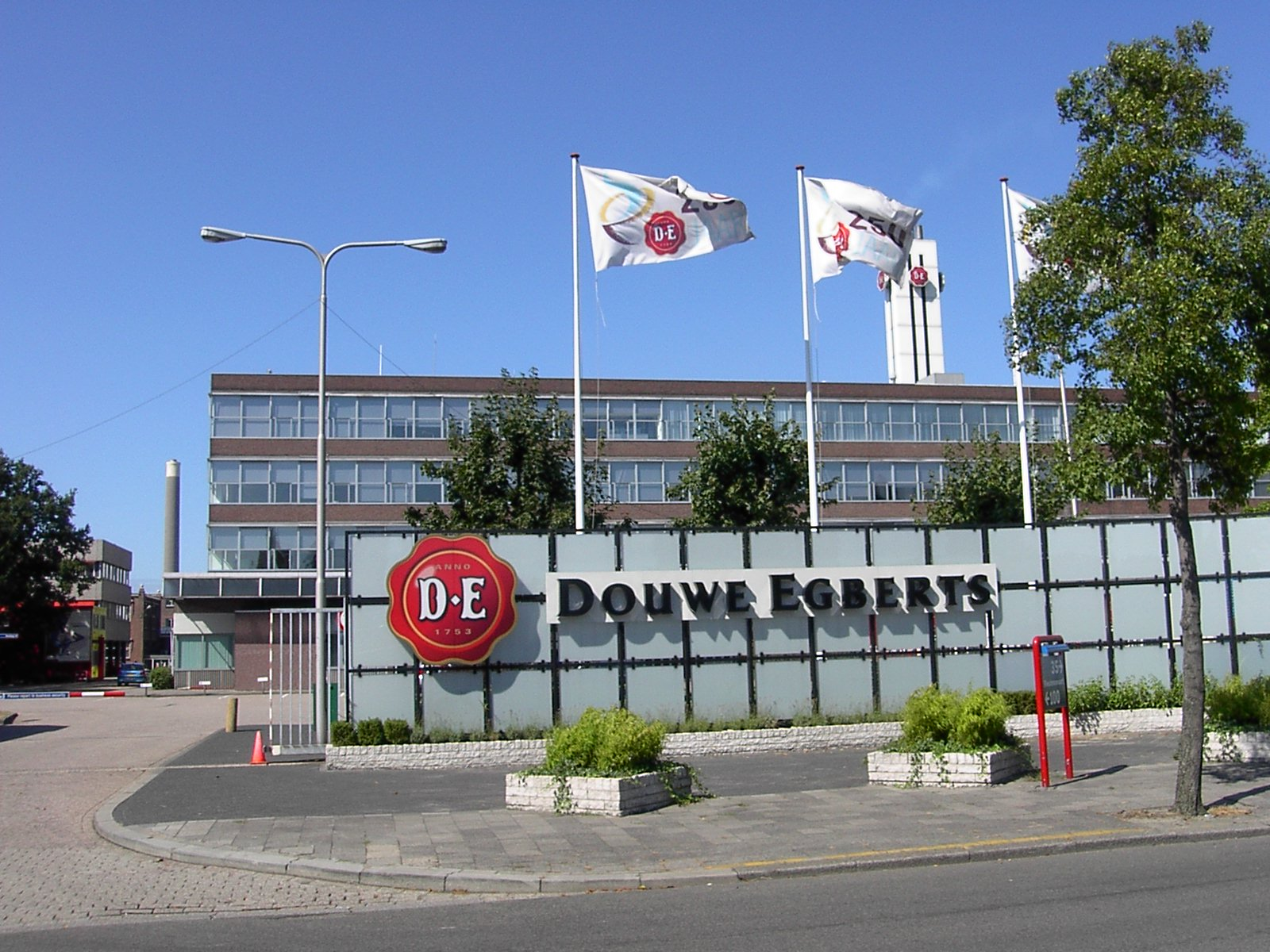
- Douwe Egberts building in Utrecht, Netherlands in 2002
- Product type: Coffee
- Current owner: JDE Peet's
- Country: Netherlands
- Introduced: 1753
- Markets: Worldwide
- Previous owners: Sara Lee Corporation (1978-2012)
- Tagline: "No ordinary jar. No ordinary coffee."
- Website: www.douwe-egberts.com

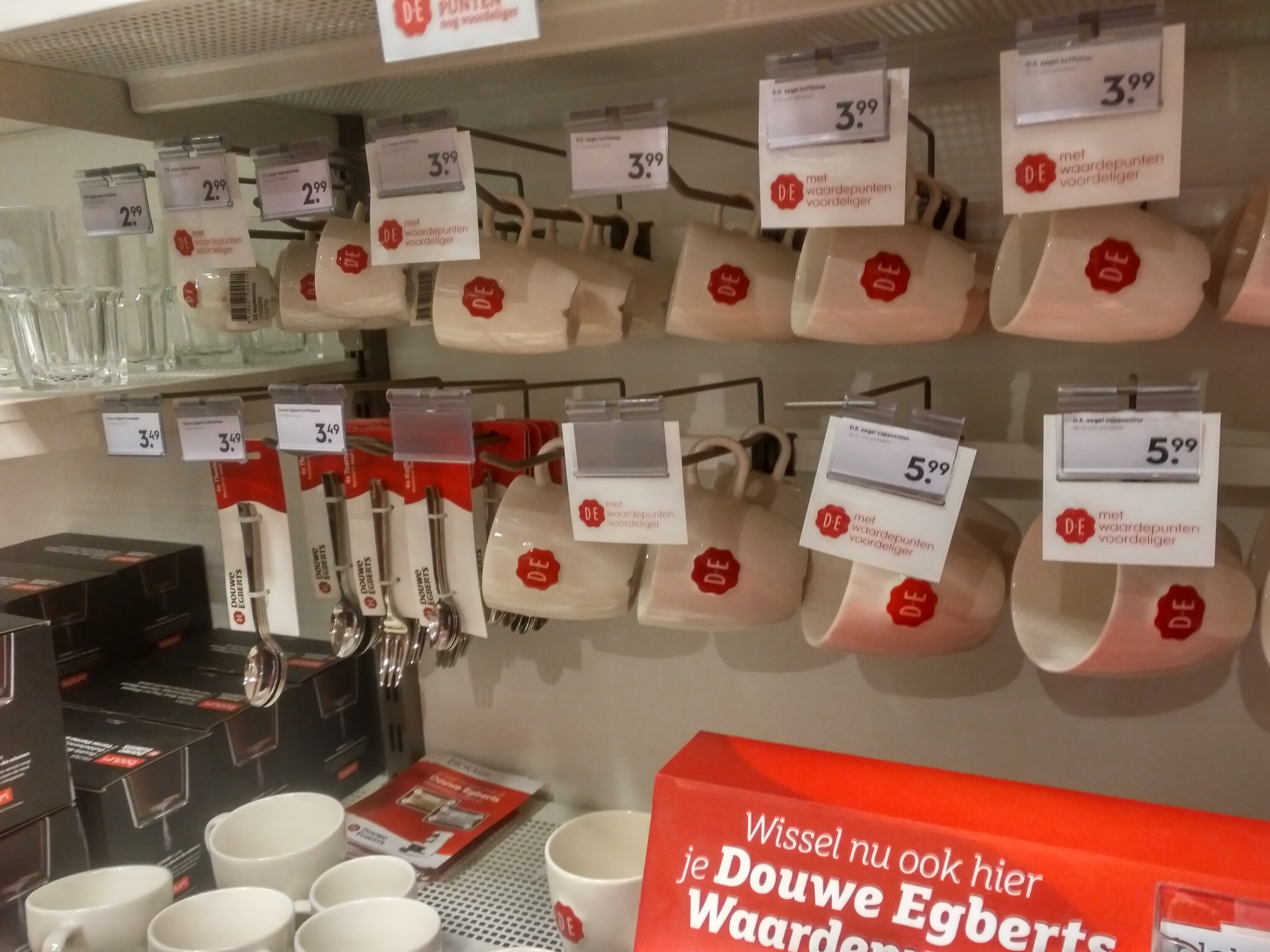
Douwe Egberts branded products in a shop in the Netherlands

Douwe Egberts is a Dutch brand specialising in coffee and related products. It is owned by JDE Peet's, a Dutch global coffee and tea company. The brand is marketed to retail consumers in Australia, Belgium, Hungary, Netherlands, New Zealand, South Africa and the United Kingdom.

== History ==
=== Beginnings and expansion (1753–1978) ===
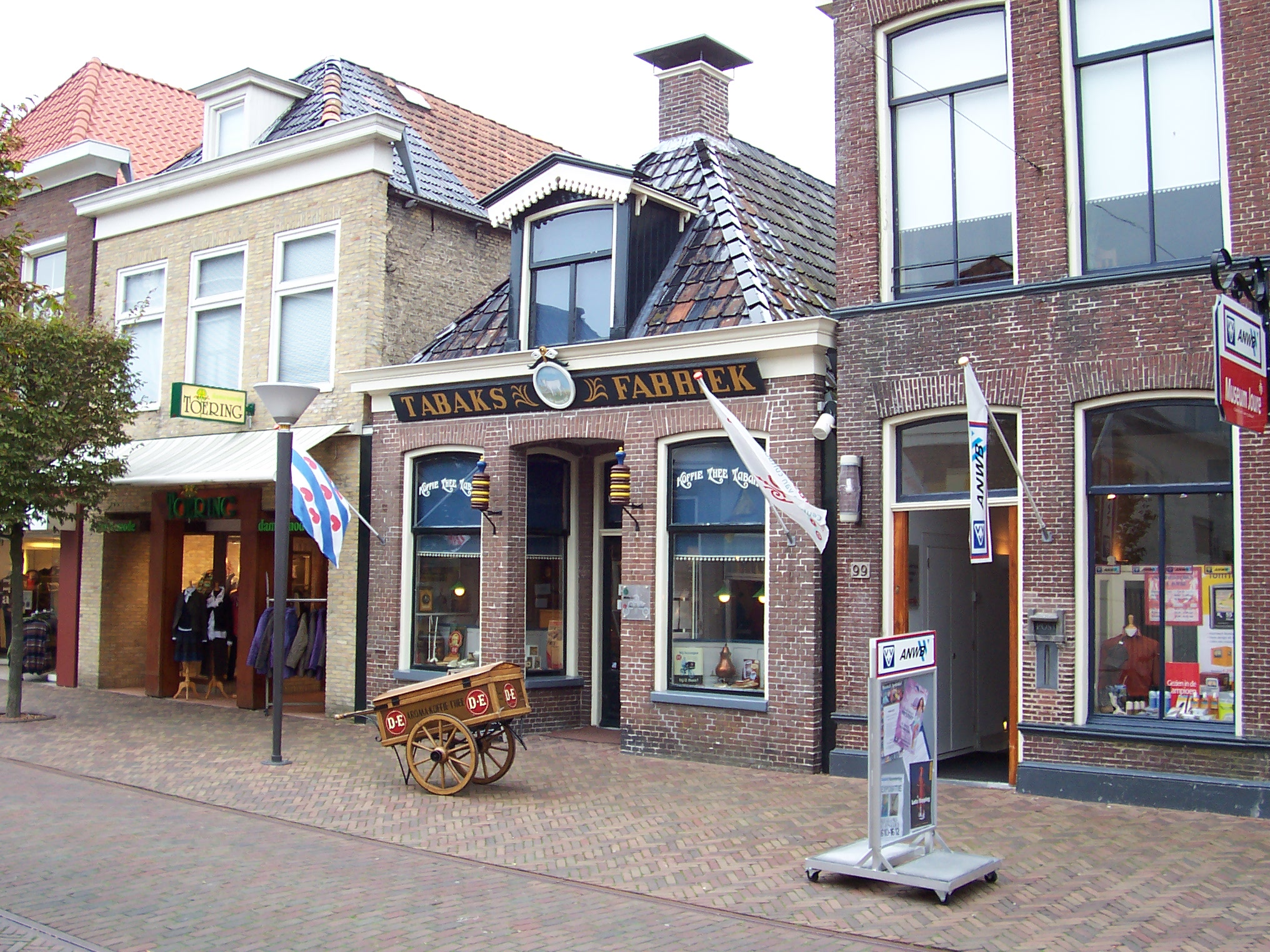
The original Douwe Egberts shop, The White Ox in Joure, Netherlands, now a museum

Douwe Egberts' origins are in Joure, Netherlands where Egbert Douwes established a grocery shop called "De Witte Os" ("The White Ox") in 1752. The company later started dealing specifically in coffee, tea, and tobacco. The company transferred to his eldest son Douwe Egberts in 1780, from whom it adopted its current name.

In 1925, it introduced its logo, a red seal with a "D.E." initialism. Douwe Egbert's former tobacco brand White Ox was named for the original De Witte Os grocery store in Joure (Douwe Egberts later sold White Ox to Imperial Tobacco in 1998).

In 1948, the company began to sell its products in Belgium, followed by France, Spain and Denmark. It founded a new holding company, Douwe Egberts Koninklijke 'Royal Douwe Egberts' in 1968, and a year later took over the Dutch coffee manufacturer Kanis & Gunnink. The company expanded through Europe, acquiring other tea, coffee and tobacco companies, such as the UK tea distributor Horniman's Tea.

=== Sara Lee Corporation (1978–2012) ===
In 1978 Douwe Egberts was taken over by Consolidated Foods Corporation, later the Sara Lee Corporation. In 1989, Douwe Egberts purchased Van Nelle, its main Dutch competitor in coffee, tea and tobacco. It sold its tobacco interests, including Van Nelle and Drum rolling tobacco, to Imperial Tobacco in 1998.

In 2001, the company collaborated with Philips to produce the Senseo coffee maker. The following year it established the Douwe Egberts Foundation, an independent entity that initiates and manages coffee and tea projects in countries of origin.

In 2007, Douwe Egberts sued the Dutch Province of Groningen for requiring coffee machine suppliers to meet the EKO organic standard and fairtrade criteria established by Stichting Max Havelaar, specifically a minimum price and development premium. Douwe Egberts, which marketed its own ethically sourced coffee brands, claimed the requirements were discriminatory. The Province of Groningen prevailed in court. According to Coen de Ruiter, director of Stichting Max Havelaar, the victory was a landmark, enabling governments to mandate fair trade coffee in purchasing policy to support poverty reduction efforts.

=== D.E Master Blenders 1753 (2012–2013) ===
With profits from the coffee division under threat from rivals such as Nestlé and Kraft, and being unable to find a buyer, in 2012 Sara Lee split off the coffee division into D.E Master Blenders 1753, offering share-holders one share in the new company for each main share they held. The main Sara Lee company changed its name to Hillshire Brands.

In 2012 Douwe Egberts became an independent Dutch company again, trading under the name D.E Master Blenders 1753 NV.

=== Jacobs Douwe Egberts (2013–2020) ===
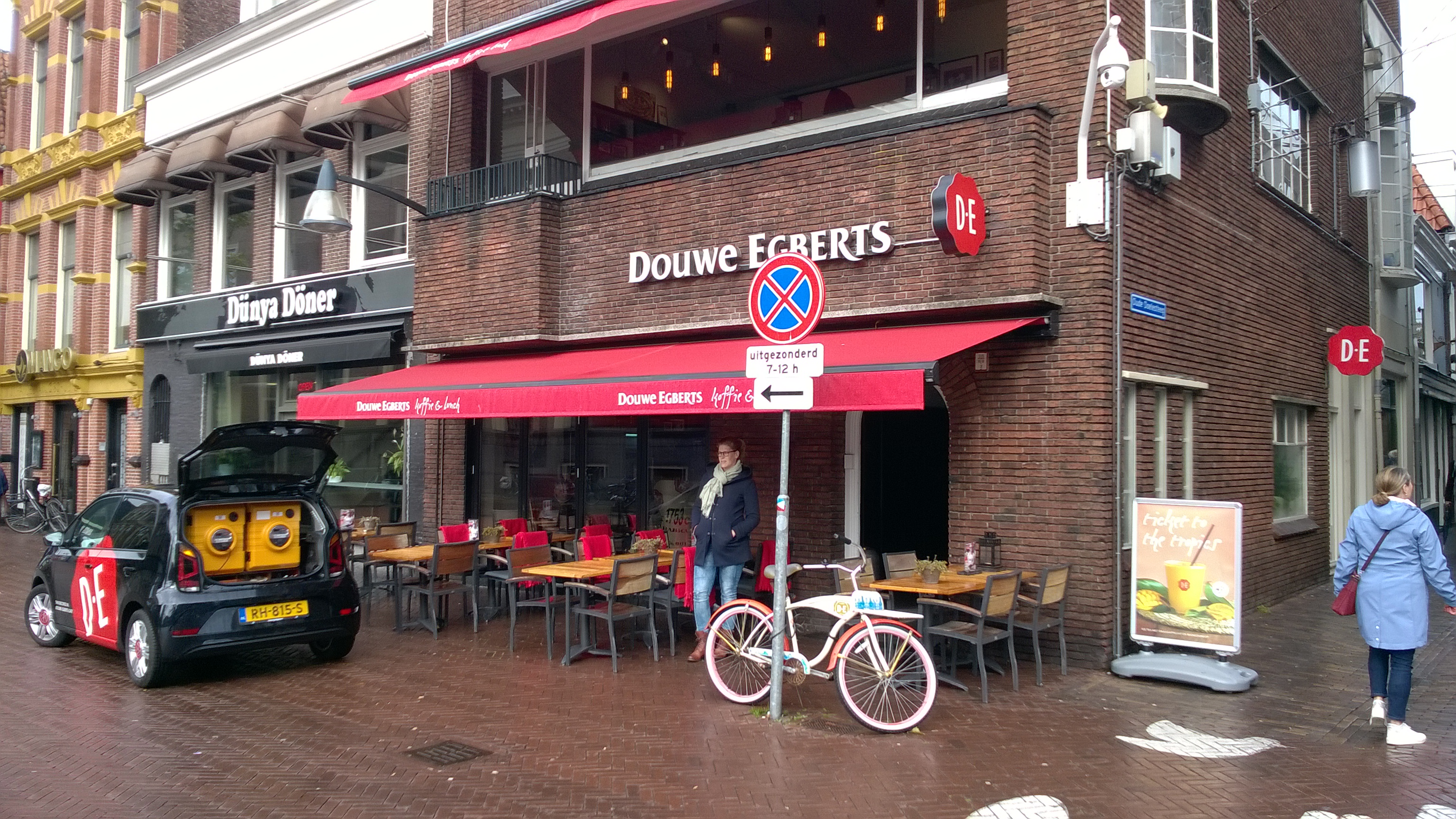
A Douwe Egberts cafe in Leeuwarden in 2018

In 2013, the German investor group JAB Holding Company made an offer to purchase D.E Master Blenders 1753 for $9.8 billion. The company appointed a new management and delisted the company from the Euronext stock market. D.E. Master Blenders 1753 later bought Norway's Kaffehuset Friele coffee manufacturer.

In May 2014 the company announced plans to merge with the coffee division of American food conglomerate Mondelez International. The merger received approval from the European Commissioner for Competition Margrethe Vestager on 5 May 2015, subject to several conditions. These included a requirement that Merrild and Carte Noire brands be sold (now owned by competitor Luigi Lavazza S.p.A.), and that the Senseo brand in Austria be licensed to a competitor (Luigi Lavazza S.p.A.).

=== JDE Peet's (2020–) ===
Jacobs Douwe Egberts merged with Peet's Coffee, another coffee business owned by JAB Holding, to form JDE Peet's which would own the Peet's chain, as well as brands including: Jacobs Coffee, Douwe Egberts, Moccona, Super Coffee, Owl Coffee, OldTown White Coffee, Kenco and Pickwick, and brewing systems including Senseo and Tassimo. The company was listed in Amsterdam in May 2020. JDE Peet's has an annual turnover of approximately €7 billion.
