= Flavia Beverage Systems =

Hot beverage system brand

Flavia is a hot beverage system. The system prepares single servings of coffee, tea, and hot chocolate drinks. The brand was owned by Mars Drinks, a division of Mars, Incorporated until October 1, 2018, when Lavazza purchased Mars's coffee units.

== Products ==
FLAVIA claims its patented technology brews drinks in a single-serve "Fresh Pack," which means that the pack is the actual brewing chamber. The drink pours directly from the packet into the cup rather than through a common channel. Used packs are collected in a tray that is emptied periodically when prompted.

The Fresh Packs are foil-sealed, protecting the ground coffees and teas from oxygen and moisture. FLAVIA markets several different machines, such as large coin-operated machines and small portable machines designed for home use.

== History ==
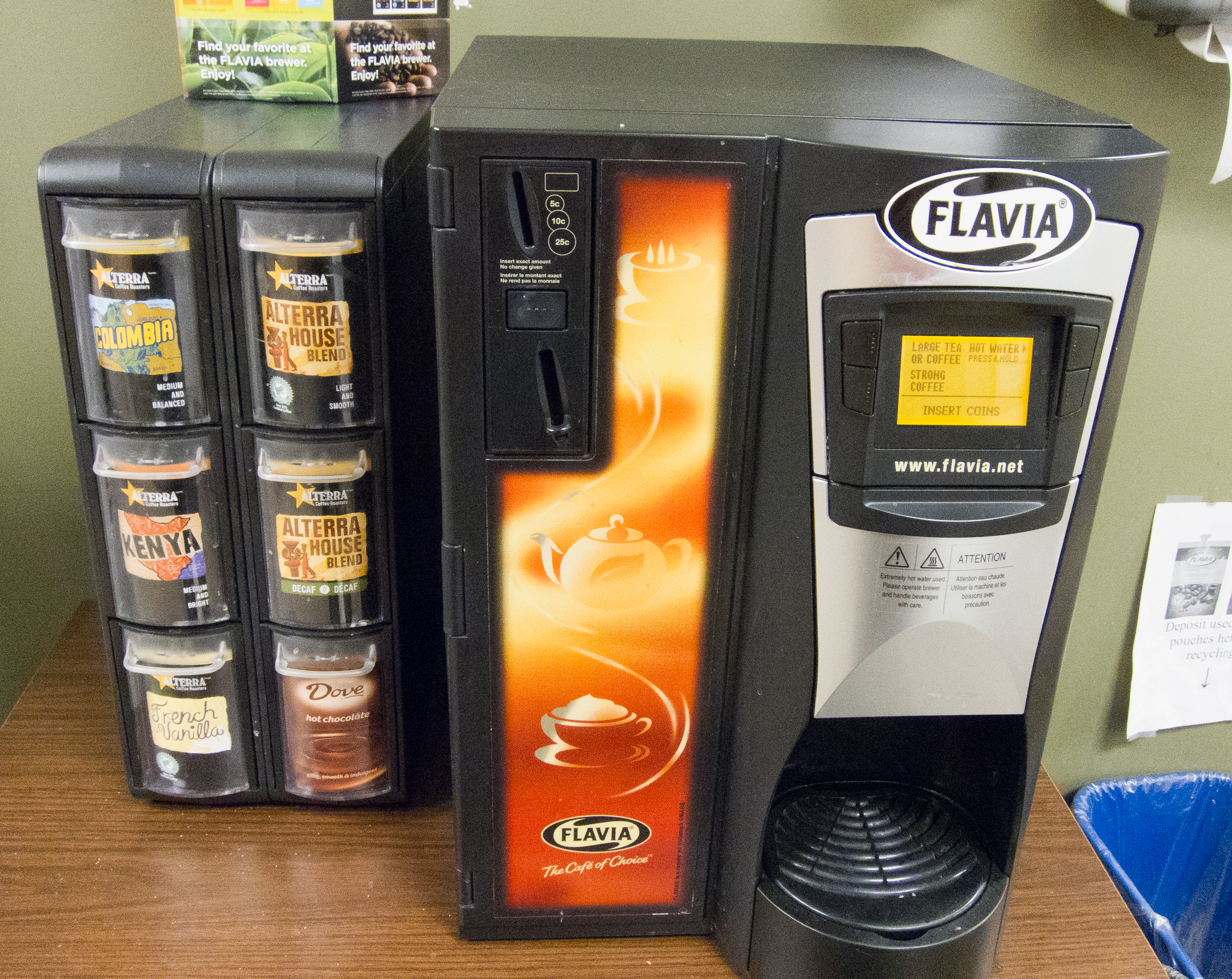
Flavia coin-operated machine.

Key events in the history of the product line include:

- 1982 The first Filterpack was manufactured in Basingstoke, UK
- 1984 FLAVIA launched its first brewer
- 1992 Launch in Japan
- 1996 Launch in US
- 1997 Launch in Canada
- 2005 FLAVIA Fusion home system launched in the US
- 2007 FLAVIA launches the Creation 400 for the US and UK
- 2008 Three Flavia drinks achieved Rainforest Alliance certification
- 2009 FLAVIA undergoes a brand refresh with a new logo and the Think Fresh! tagline
- 2010 Mars Drinks acquires the Alterra Coffee Roasters brand from Colectivo Coffee Roasters and launched The Bright Tea Company
- 2018 Lavazza North America buys Flavia including The Bright Tea Company and Alterra Coffee Roasters from Mars.

== Awards and achievements ==
In February 2006, the Flavia Fusion drinks station earned the Good Housekeeping Seal, which means that the product has a two-year limited warranty.

== In popular culture ==
The Flavia system features in series 2 of I'm Alan Partridge – the title character refers to it as the "king of coffees" and has a machine in his static caravan.

== See also ==
- Coffee service
- Easy Serving Espresso Pod
- Caffitaly
- K-Cup
- T-Discs
- Melitta
- Senseo
