= Senseo =

Coffee brewing system

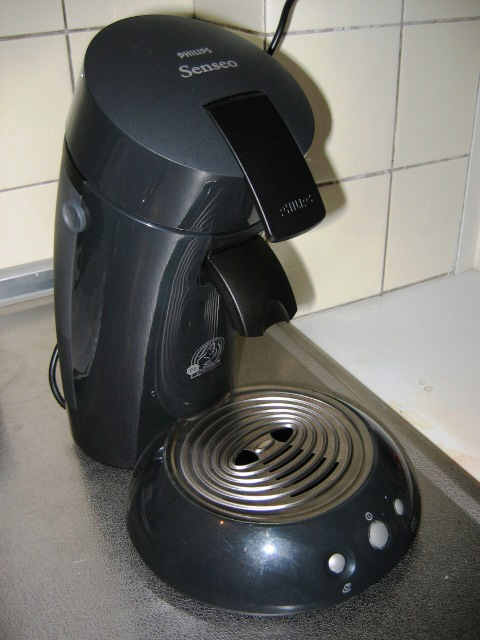
A Senseo coffee machine

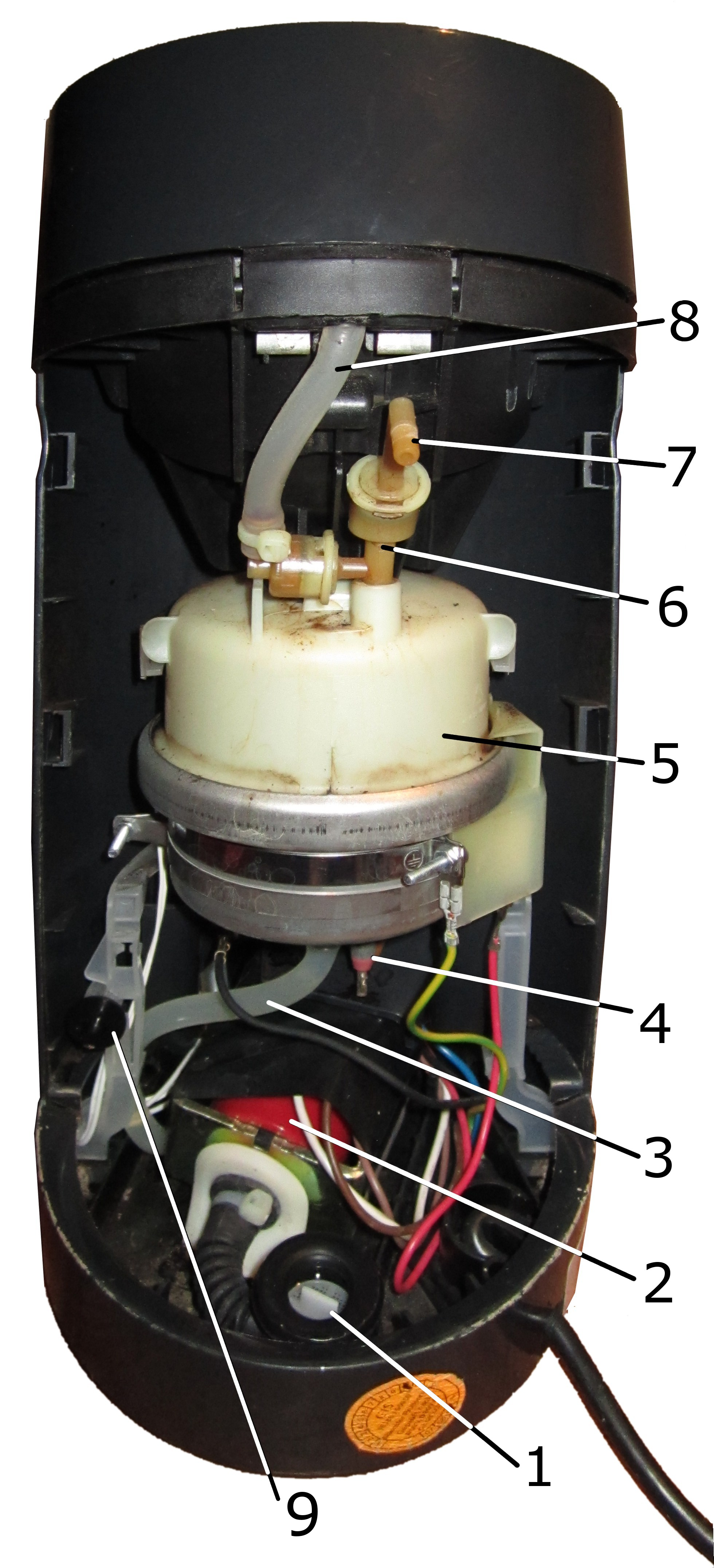
Inside of a second generation Senseo coffee machine (click for legend)

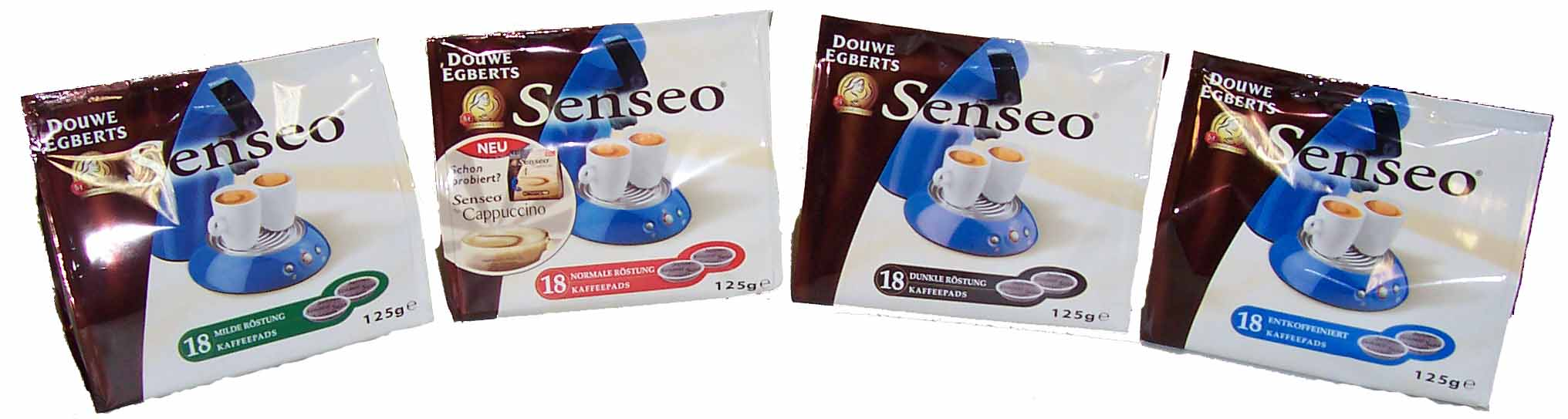
Senseo coffee pods

Senseo is a registered trademark for a coffee brewing system from Dutch companies Philips and Douwe Egberts. The system is known for the coffee pods (called pads in some countries) it uses to brew the coffee.

== History ==
The system was first introduced in the Netherlands in February 2001, followed by Belgium and France, Germany/Austria/and Denmark, United Kingdom and United States, and Australia (in chronological order). The Senseo was developed by WeLL Design. According to Philips, by 2005 ten million machines and four billion pads had been sold worldwide, by and over 20 million machines by 2008.

A new model of the Senseo machine, the Senseo New Generation, was launched in selected markets in 2007. This updated version allows the user to adjust the height of the mechanism to accommodate larger cups or mugs, has an indicator light function which shows when there is insufficient water for two cups (as opposed to the previous model which only showed whether there was sufficient water left for one cup), features a larger water reservoir and has an option which allows the user to adjust the amount of hot water used per cup.

The Senseo Latte Select machine was introduced in 2008, and features a separate milk reservoir. The machine utilizes the same coffee pods, and can produce three different variants of coffee with foam milk: Cappuccino, Café Latte and Latte macchiato. The three variants are not true brews though, as the machine cannot produce real espresso, but rather regular coffee, which is mixed with the foam milk. The machine can also produce regular coffee, and features three different strength settings.

In 2009 the Senseo Quadrante was introduced which features a new brick like design. The coffee pods are still the same, however the pod holder is designed differently. The Quadrante series also features a bigger water tank and allows the use of higher mugs through its three different mounting positions of the cup holder.

In November 2011 Sara Lee announced that they would discontinue selling the Senseo product line in North America.

Senseo pods can still be used with compatible drip-coffee-makers, made by Hamilton Beach.

In January 2018, a North American electric compatible Senseo coffee maker once again became available to the public. The new Senseo Original XL HD7810/65 II Black USA Machine is an upgrade from prior models, and included an XL 40 US fl oz (1,200 ml) water tank; Intensity Select buttons to adjust for more or less intense taste; an increased the number of water dispensing holes to 45, and a metal drip tray.

== Aftermarket products ==
Some aftermarket products allow consumers to use ground coffee in a Senseo coffee maker and avoid the higher cost of single-serve pods. The "Coffeeduck" is a durable filter that can be filled with coffee and placed in the Senseo machine to brew a cup of coffee (one Coffeeduck can be re-used thousands of times). There is also a device that allows one to make paper coffee pods with any chosen ground coffee.

== Blends ==
The main blends are mild, regular, mocca, dark roast and extra dark and there is also a decaffeinated variety. The blends differ, according to general taste, in different countries. The special blends, Colombia, Kenya and Brazil are blended from arabica coffees. There are also coffee pods with added flavors, called Vienna, Rio de Janeiro, Sevilla & Marrakech. More recent varieties launched in selected European markets include cappuccino, café choco and espresso. Douwe Egberts Senseo has launched a Hot Choco variety in Belgium and the Netherlands. Latest launches in Germany are the Guten Morgen breakfast blend and Caffé Crema, an Italian blend. In France, Maison du café Senseo has launched Noir Subtil.

== Patent disputes ==
A European patent application with the aim "to protect an assembly of pad holder and pad", i.e. the Senseo coffee pods, was filed on September 30, 1998, by the Dutch firm "Sara Lee/DE N.V." The European Patent Office granted EP 0904717 on July 11, 2001. The European patent took force in a number of Contracting States of the European Patent Convention, including Belgium.

=== Dispute in Belgium ===
On February 20, 2004, the Court of First Instance of Antwerp, Belgium, ruled in a lawsuit between three Belgian coffee vendors, N.V. Fort Koffiebranderij, S.A. Cafés Liégeois and N.V. Beyers Koffie, versus Philips and Douwe Egberts over the European patent, and decided that the other coffee vendors were allowed to produce and market coffee pods that fit the Senseo. The Senseo creators had used their patent to get an injunction against the marketing of coffee pods by other coffee brands, and those others replied by seeking a declaratory judgment of non-infringement.

One consideration the Belgian judge offered for the ruling is that coffee pods already existed. That ruling ended the Senseo coffee pod monopoly, and following that ruling, practically every coffee vendor in the Benelux countries started production of coffee pods. The Antwerp ruling affects the patents on the pods, but does not affect the patents on the Senseo machine itself.

An appeal in court changed this patent matter, and the new judgement was that the other coffee makers were infringing on the European patent in Belgium.

=== Revocation by the European Patent Office ===
In the meantime, the European patent was opposed before the European Patent Office by a number of companies including Kraft Foods and, on August 30, 2006, Sara Lee's EP 0904717 covering the Senseo pads was completely revoked on appeal by the European Patent Office. Suzanne Rotteveel, spokeswoman for Sara Lee in the Netherlands, said:

We're very disappointed since we invested a lot of time, energy and money. It's disappointing when you are not able to regain a part of that investment. (...) what this ruling means is that we no longer have protection for our patent in Europe.

== See also ==
- Easy Serving Espresso Pod
- Keurig
- Flavia
- Razor and blades business model
- Nespresso
- Tassimo
- Caffitaly
