= Piesslinger =

Aluminium processing company

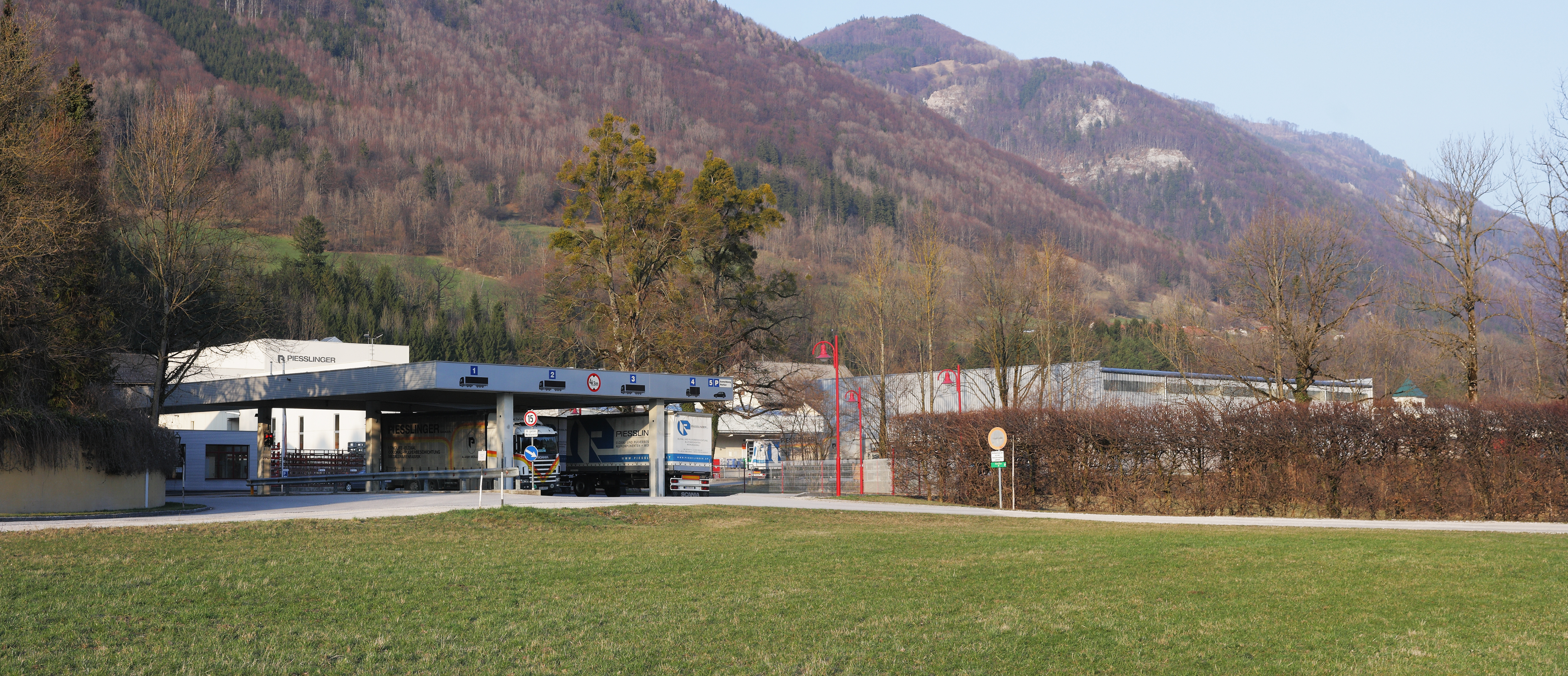
- Piesslingerwerk in Molln
- Native name: Piesslinger GmBH
- Industry: Aluminium
- Founded: 1553
- Headquarters: Im Gstadt 1, A-4591 Molln, Austria
- Website: www.piesslinger.at/en

Piesslinger is a traditional aluminium processing company in Molln, Austria founded in 1553.

The basic facts:

- Piesslinger is a family business now run by the 11th generation.
- It processes aluminum surfaces (powder coating and anodizing) of doors and windows.
- Aluminum is processed into decorative parts, such as Nespresso capsules, speakers and coffee machines.

== See also ==
- List of oldest companies
