= BabyNes =

Baby formula-making machine

- Product type: Beverage machine
- Current owner: Nestlé
- Introduced: 2011

BabyNes is a beverage machine by Nestlé that makes infant formula from single-use capsules, similar to Nestlé's Nespresso. The product was designed to recreate Nespresso's success with coffee in the baby formula industry. It was first introduced in Switzerland on May 25, 2011. The Wall Street Journal referred to Nespresso as Nestlé's fastest growing brand in 2011 after its sales rose by 20% in 2010 and it brought a number of legal actions against competitors. Nestlé reported strong sales for the product in late 2011.

== Product ==
BabyNes uses a proprietary single-use capsule of milk powder with water to create a single serving of infant formula. Nestlé has called the technology "state-of-the-art" and emphasized its hygiene, speed, and ease. The company said that the machine prepares the formula "at precisely the right dosage and temperature, at the push of a button, in less than one minute". The capsules come in two sizes and six formulations based on the baby's age and weight. The machine comes with a chip to confirm the capsules' authenticity. The system was noted for its high price, with capsules whose cost is four times the cost of Nespresso capsules.

BabyNes sales by August 2011 had "exceeded expectations". In June 2011, Nestlé announced plans to begin marketing the product outside Switzerland by 2012. Nestlé also announced considerations to allow for machine rentals.

== Criticism ==
BabyNes has drawn criticism from the International Baby Food Action Network, who accused Nestlé of violating the International Code of Marketing of Breast-milk Substitutes, and described the machine as a product for the rich. BabyNes's director responded that they follow the World Health Organization's policy and do not market the product to mothers with children younger than six months. They also announced a 24-hour customer service hotline and a customer website.

Baby Milk Action, an organization that campaigns against breastmilk substitutes, requested that Nestlé add details to the product's labeling and questioned how it was possible for the solution to properly mix and cool in under a minute.

Time referred to the BabyNes concept as ridiculous and criticized its marketing language, referring to the product as "environmental madness" and "a product of greed".

Amy Corbett Storch of Mamapop criticized the device for its high price, the high price of its formula capsules, and the lack of perceived benefits of the device over regular powdered formula and prepared formula.

== See also ==
- Lofenalac
