= Nespresso =

Coffee brand owned by Nestlé SA

Nestlé Nespresso S.A.
- Trade name: Nespresso
- Type: Société anonyme
- Founded: 1986; 40 years ago
- Headquarters: Vevey, Switzerland
- Number of locations: 802 boutiques (2025)
- Areas served: Worldwide
- Key people: Alfonso Gonzales Loeschen (CEO)
- Products: Coffee capsules/pods, coffee machines
- Number of employees: 13,500 (2017)
- Parent: Nestlé S.A.
- Website: nespresso.com

Nestlé Nespresso S.A., trading as Nespresso, is an operating unit of the Nestlé Group, based in Vevey, Switzerland. Nespresso machines brew espresso and coffee from coffee capsules (or pods in machines for home or professional use), a type of pre-apportioned single-use container, or reusable capsules (pods), of ground coffee beans, sometimes with added flavorings. Once inserted into a machine, the capsules are pierced and processed. Water is then forced against a heating element at high pressure meaning that only the quantity for a single cup is warmed. By 2011 Nespresso had annual sales in excess of 3 billion Swiss francs. The word Nespresso is a portmanteau of "Nestlé" and "Espresso", a naming technique used by other Nestlé brands such as (Nescafé, BabyNes, Nesquik).

All Nespresso coffee is roasted, ground and encapsulated in one of three factories in Switzerland (Avenches, Orbe, and Romont), but the company sells its system of machines and capsules worldwide, as well as the VertuoLine system in North America and certain other countries.

== History ==
In 1975, Eric Favre, an employee of Nestlé, noticed that a coffee bar near the Pantheon in Rome had a disproportionately large number of customers. He found that the only difference between that bar and the many others using the same machines was that operators pumped the piston many times before releasing the coffee, while others did so only once. Oxidization occurs as the pumping action pushes water and air into the ground coffee. This increases the flavor in the coffee and creates the foam seen on top, called crema.

Favre invented the Nespresso system. The pod containing coffee was sealed, keeping it fresh. In use, it ensured greater aeration, like the repeated pumping that Favre had noticed. In operation, a sharp-pointed spout pierces the capsule and injects pressurised hot water, forcing the foil against a spiked plate, which bursts it inwards, letting the espresso flow out of the spout.

The base of a first-generation Nespresso machine capsule holder; as well as the raised squares which controls capsule rupture points, the holes between the squares through which the espresso exits the holder are also visible

The system was patented by Nestlé in 1976. Early prototypes were complicated machines with large tanks, pumps and tubes – the machine remained unfit to market for a decade. It was first introduced to the Swiss market, looking like large traditional commercial espresso machines, but it initially met with limited success. Nespresso first tested its new concept in Japan in 1986, and rolled it out to consumers in Switzerland, France, Italy and Japan the same year. A decade later, the product became far more successful, largely due to Jean-Paul Gaillard's efforts. He introduced the Le Club community, which gave Nestlé a large database of customers and their preferences; lowered machine prices while increasing capsule prices; repositioned the machine from an office appliance into a luxury consumer brand; and licensed production to other companies. In 1990s, Nestlé signed a contract with Turmix, which started to sell Nespresso machines in Switzerland. Thereafter, other contracts were signed with Krups, Magimix, Alessi, Philips, Siemens and De'Longhi. Starting out as an e-commerce business, Nespresso only opened their first boutique in Paris in 2000 as a concept store. Today, Nespresso has a global network of more than 802 boutiques in 515 cities.

In later years there was friction between Favre—who devised the concept and developed the first machines—and Gaillard, who made the machine a commercial success. Favre resigned in 1990 after personality clashes, and the two men were critical of each other. Gaillard left Nestlé in 1997 after falling out with CEO Peter Brabeck-Letmathe. He claimed that the original idea for Nespresso was bought by Nestlé in 1973, and did not come from Favre, though Nespresso denies this. In 2008, Gaillard launched a company that sold biodegradable capsules for Nespresso machines, competing with Nespresso.

In 2022, Nespresso became a certified B Corporation.

== Nespresso system ==
=== Machines ===
Nespresso sells or licenses a number of different machines mostly made in Europe. The machines carry well-known kitchen-equipment manufacturers' names such as Krups, Breville, and DeLonghi but are mostly manufactured by Eugster/Frismag, a Swiss company that ranks among the world's largest coffee-machine producers. DeLonghi manufactures the Lattissima models in Italy exclusively. Eugster/Frismag is a strict original equipment manufacturer (OEM) and does not sell under its own brand. In 2000, Nespresso began distributing machines bearing the "Nespresso" brand. There are numerous models that range in complexity and price, from the entry level Inissia, U and Pixie ranges.

=== Capsules ===
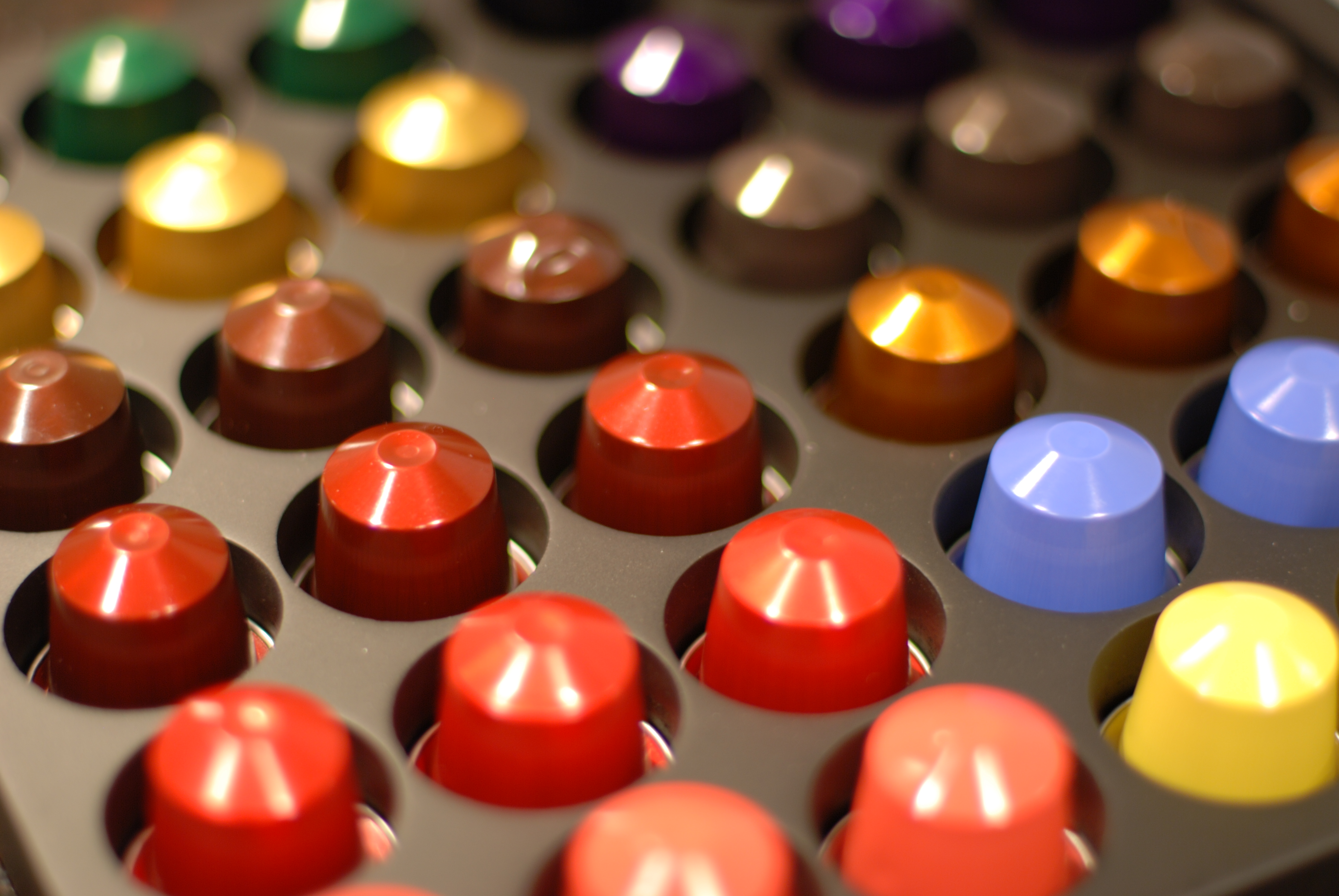
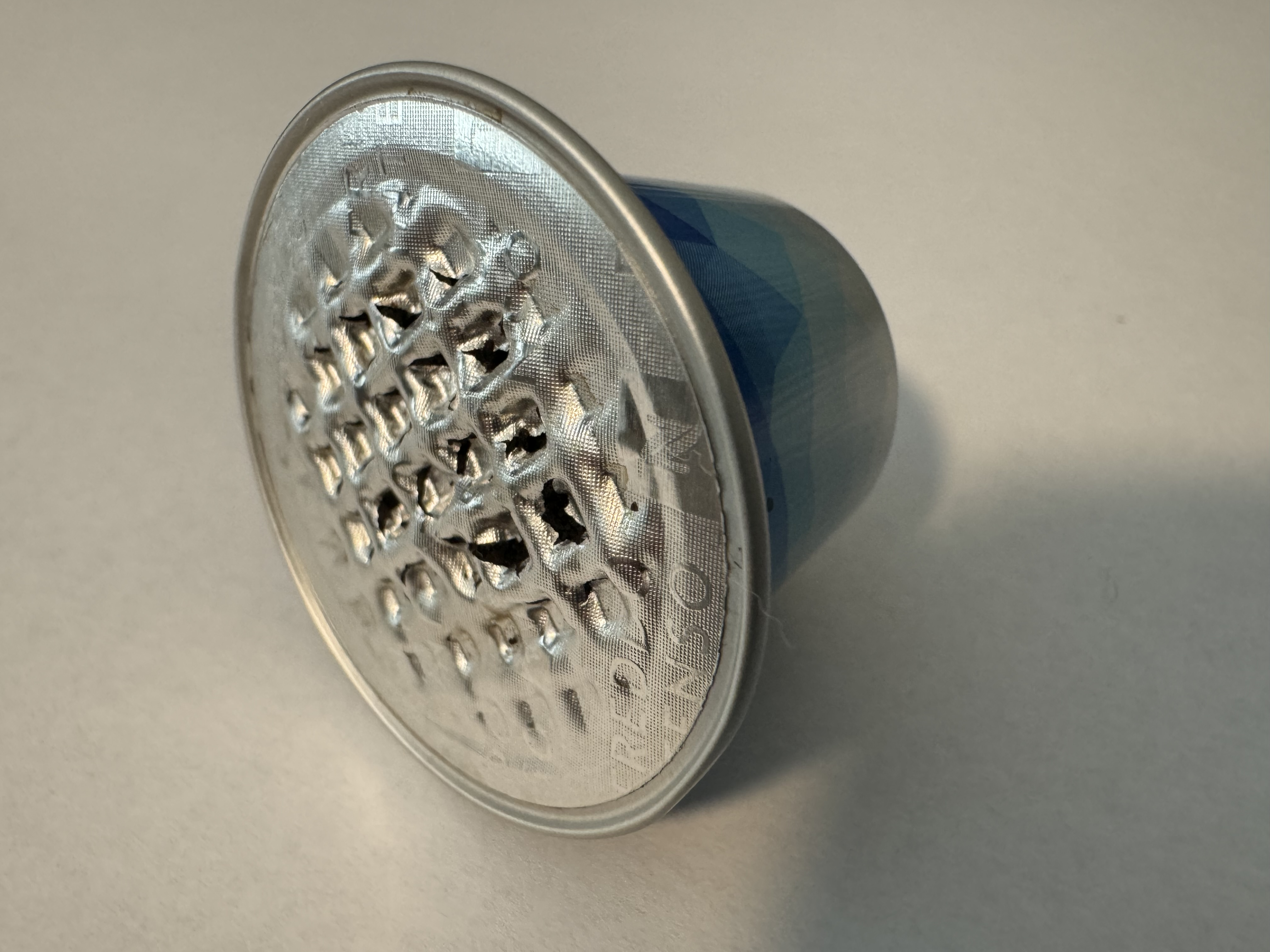
(Left): Assorted Nespresso OriginalLine capsules: each color indicates a variety of coffee; (right): bottom of a used Nespresso capsule, showing the ruptures in the foil from which the brewed coffee flows; these ruptures are created when the capsule is pressurized against the head of the machine

Nespresso capsules were sold exclusively by Nespresso while the machines were under patent, and are significantly more expensive than an equivalent quantity of "loose" ground coffee. Because the capsule is hermetically sealed, the coffee's aroma remains intact over time, unlike coffee stored in a pack. Nespresso currently sells 28 different Original Line arabica and robusta capsules with Limited Edition are released seasonally. As the system is no longer under patent, more and more third-party and refillable capsules can now be purchased in some grocery stores and shops.

Each capsule contains 5–7 grams of ground coffee, which makes one serving of coffee. Depending on the length of the pour, the capsule can produce a 40 ml Espresso shot, or a 110 ml Lungo (long) pour. Nespresso-supplied capsule bodies and perforated tops are both made of aluminium, while third-party capsules are made from a variety of materials, including plastic and aluminium. To assuage some concerns on potential aluminium health effects, most of the capsule interior of Nespresso capsules is lined with food-grade lacquer.

For the professional market, a different system of Nespresso pods exists. These pad-shaped capsules are not interchangeable with the consumer capsules.

=== Process ===
Making a cold coffee using Nespresso coffee maker and a cold coffee Nespresso capsule

Nespresso's hermetically sealed capsules are made of aluminum. Depending on the Nespresso system being used, the flat top or the pointed end of the capsule is pierced when inserted into the machine and the compartment lever is lowered. Some machines make a single large hole, and others make three smaller holes. When the machine is activated it pumps hot water under high pressure into injector holes poked into the narrow end of the capsule upon insertion. This causes the flat bottom of the capsule to rupture, as it is made of thinner foil than the rest of the capsule. The base of the capsule holder (on which the capsule sits) has several raised squares which cause the foil to rupture at these points. The brewed coffee exits the capsule through these rupture holes and flows through a funnel nozzle into the coffee cup. As in pressure cookers, a safety pressure release valve inside the brewing chamber prevents an explosion from occurring if the normal coffee exhaust path becomes blocked. This process produces a crema which is micro air bubbles that are mixed with the coffee's natural soluble oils. The crema resembles a tan colored froth that floats at the top of the coffee.

== VertuoLine system ==
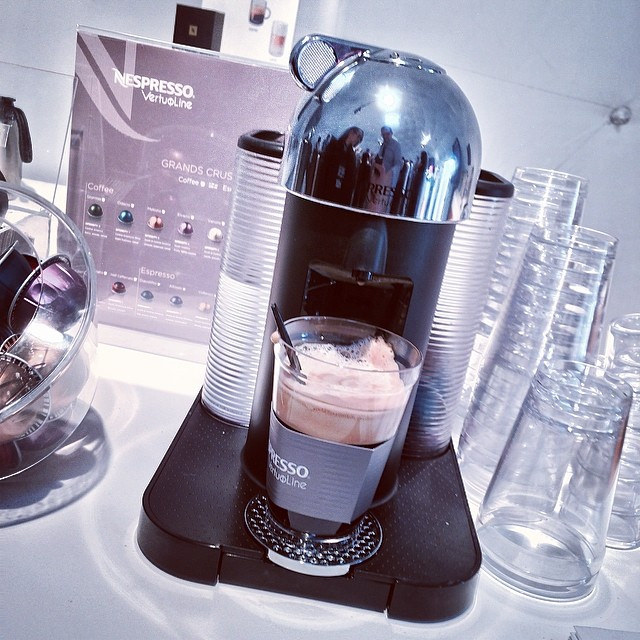
A VertuoLine machine and capsules

To appeal to the demand by North Americans for larger servings of coffee than the original Nespresso machine produces, in February 2014 Nespresso launched a new "VertuoLine" system of machines and capsules in the United States and Canada. The system produces Espresso (40ml/1.35oz), Double Espresso (80ml/2.7oz), Gran Lungo (150ml/5oz), Mug/Coffee (230ml/8oz) and Alto/Alto XL (414ml/14oz) cup sizes that characterises espresso coffees and the original line of Nespresso coffees. Nespresso simultaneously uses over 25 blends in specially designed VertuoLine capsules. The VertuoLine capsules cannot be used in the original line of Nespresso machines (now branded "OriginalLine" in North America). Nespresso continues to sell both OriginalLine and VertuoLine machines and capsules in the United States and Canada, targeting different market segments with the two systems.

A pair of the VertuoLine style pods

The VertuoLine system uses two technologies not found in the OriginalLine. First, the system uses "Centrifusion" (a term created by Nespresso, being a portmanteau of centrifugal force and infusion), whereby it spins the capsule around in the machine at up to 7,000 rpm to blend the ground coffee and hot water. Second, each capsule has a barcode embedded on the rim, and the barcode laser scanning system reads 5 different parameters: rotational speed, temperature, infusion time, volume and flow of water. Some critics claim that the VertuoLine technology, particularly the use of bar codes, is an attempt by Nestlé to create a new proprietary Nespresso system which excludes compatible capsules from other companies.

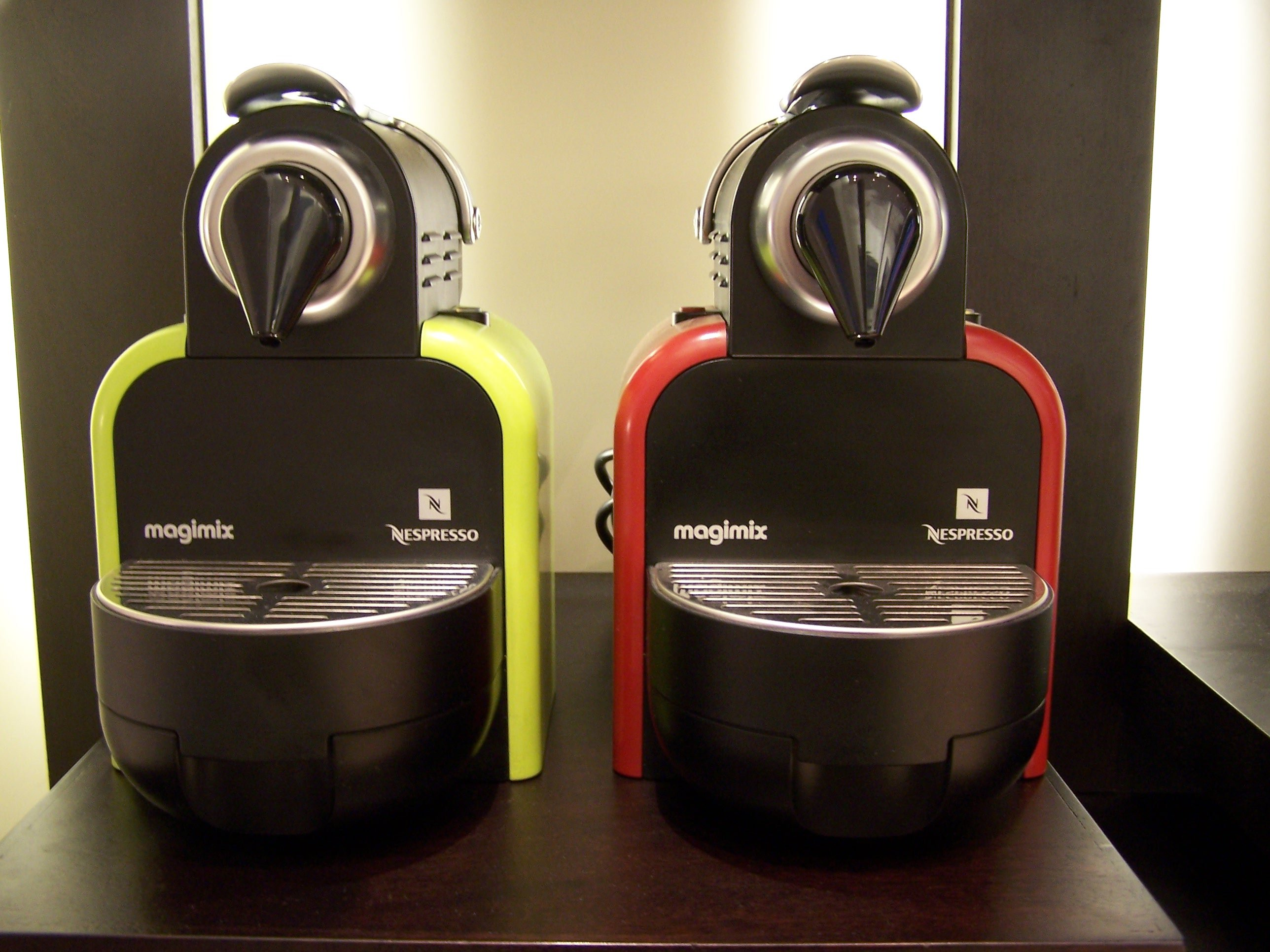
A pair of Nespresso Magimix M100 machines

The VertuoLine system was intended to expand Nespresso's product line to offer coffee closer to the American style of filtered coffee, and thus expand Nespresso's market share in North America. In the United States, Nespresso had only a 3% share of the single-serve coffee market in the year before the introduction of VertuoLine (compared with 72% for Green Mountain's Keurig system), while in Canada Nespresso had 4 to 5% of the single-serve market in 2013 (compared to approximately 53% for Keurig and 40% for Tassimo). In comparison, Nestlé had 70% of the single-serve market in Europe in 2013.

At the time of the introduction of the VertuoLine system in 2014, there were no plans to launch the system in markets outside Canada and the United States. However, sales of the VertuoLine system were expanded beyond North America in 2016, first with the launch of the system in France in 2016 under the name "Vertuo" (with the original line branded "Original"), and with later roll outs in other countries such as the United Kingdom, Germany, Switzerland and Australia. As of 2018, Nespresso aimed to introduce the Vertuoline system in eight additional European markets by the end of the year. In September 2019, the VertuoLine system launched in the Middle East in Kuwait, UAE, and KSA under the name "Vertuo".

== Business model ==
=== Patent expiry and focus on image ===
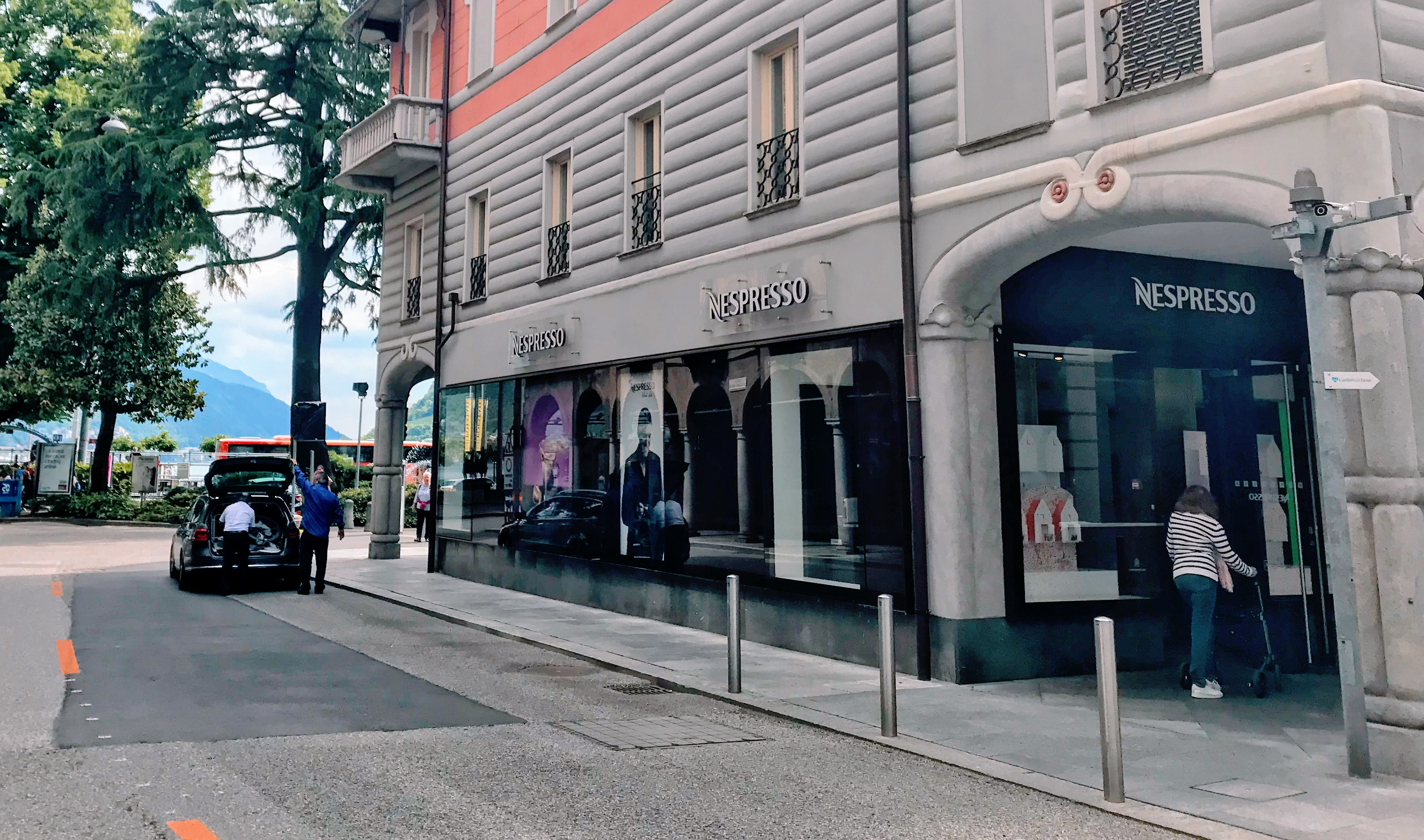
A Nespresso store in Lugano, Switzerland

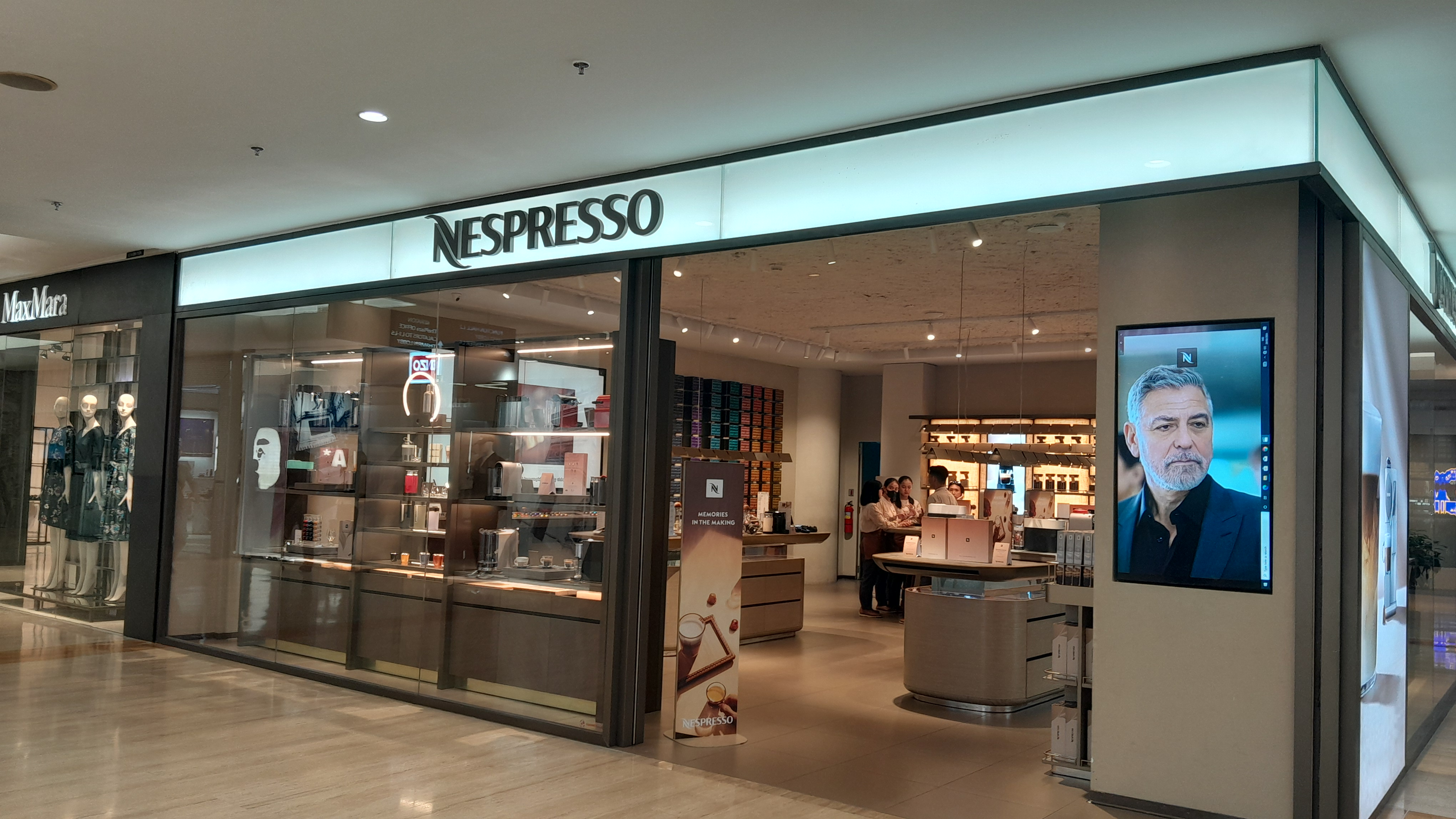
A Nespresso store at Plaza Indonesia

In 2010 the concept (machine, capsule, service) was still subject to 1,700 patents which protected Nespresso's ownership of the concept until their expiry, leading to comparisons of Nespresso with printer manufacturers that block the sale of generic ink cartridges to achieve a vendor lock-in effect. That contrasts with some other prepackaged coffee preparation systems.

Nespresso's patents began to expire in 2012, gradually allowing competitors to offer capsules and machines compatible with the Nespresso system. By 2010, Nestlé was working on ways to prevent competitors from doing this. The service part of Nespresso's business model—the Nespresso Club and Nespresso stores and cafes—was aimed to be a long-term defense for the brand, its elevated image and premium pricing. Beyond attentive customer service and being the only places where most customers can replenish their 'pods', the brand has been able to maintain images of exclusivity and suave connoisseur-ship. Actor George Clooney appeared in ads for Nespresso, with company representatives insisting that he had been elected by Club members to become the brand's ambassador (vs the brand 'buying his sponsorship'), in a form of celebrity advertising that emphasizes the status of the brand over that of the endorsing star.

=== Market ===
Packaged portions of espresso coffee, like those from Nespresso, has become one of the fastest growing segments of the coffee market, accounting for 20 to 40 percent of the value of ground coffee sales in the US$17 billion European coffee market. In August 2010, it was reported that Nespresso sales had been growing at an average of 30 percent per year over the previous 10 years, and more than 20 billion capsules had been sold since 2000 at a selling price equivalent to about US$0.43 to US$0.62 per capsule.

Nespresso reported annual sales of CHF 3 billion in 2011, growing by 20% during the fiscal year.

=== Cost ===
Nespresso sources most of its coffee through the Nespresso AAA Sustainable Quality Program. In 2017 the company reported that 82% of beans were sourced through the scheme. In the US, the price of capsules ranges from a standard US$0.70 to US$2.40 for limited editions. In Europe, capsule prices were around €0.35 in the Netherlands.

== Marketing campaigns ==
George Clooney is considered the "Face of Nespresso" and has been starring in Nespresso's ad campaigns since 2006, first in European and international campaigns and since 2015 in US market ones as well. In these campaigns Clooney has paired with actors such as John Malkovich, Danny DeVito, and Matt Damon, who reportedly was paid $3 million for his participation.

In the summer of 2020, amid the global COVID-19 pandemic, Nespresso released an Internet ad on their YouTube channel that focused on sustainability.

In 2026, Nespresso launched "Vertuo World", its largest global marketing campaign to date, featuring singer Dua Lipa as the new Global Brand Ambassador along with the brand new Vertuo Up machine. The campaign targeted younger customers, particularly Generation Z, by highlighting a wider range of coffee occasions, including iced beverages, flavored coffees, and coffee-based cocktails. Longtime ambassador George Clooney also appeared in a supporting role, bridging the brand's established identity with its newer, youth-oriented positioning.

== Competitors ==
=== Machines ===
In August 2011, the Australian company Kogan announced the development of the "Ez-press", a coffee machine compatible with Nespresso pods.

=== Capsules ===
In 2008, Jean-Paul Gaillard, a former CEO at Nespresso, started a rival firm, Ethical Coffee Company SA (ECC), to make compatible biodegradable capsules for the Nespresso machine, withdrawing from this "loss-making" market in 2017.

In March 2016, Starbucks announced that it would sell Nespresso-compatible capsules in Europe. These were launched with four core pods including three single origin pods, and are compatible with all consumer Nespresso machines, but not those such as a commercial Nespresso machine or in a Miele integrated unit. Nestlé later bought the perpetual rights for Starbucks' retail and wholesale coffee businesses excluding Starbucks' retail goods sold within its stores and ready-to-drink products. Starbucks and Nestlé then launched official Starbucks Nespresso capsules in May 2019.

== Ecological impact ==
Unless the capsule is recycled, each capsule produces 1g of aluminum waste. Recycling aluminum uses as little as 5% of the energy needed to produce aluminum from ore. Initially, Nestlé did not implement any recycling programs outside a few areas of Switzerland. That led to a large amount of waste generation, which was criticized by user groups. As of 2017, Nespresso has set up capsule-collection systems in 36 countries. France and Switzerland are some of Nespresso's biggest buyers so the recycling facilities are more accessible in these countries.

Only 24.6% of Nespresso capsules are recycled globally, but the company states that it has the capacity to recycle 100% of its capsules through its recycling program. The proportion of recycled aluminum in the capsules is not known, but is estimated to be greater than 80% of capsules produced (per annum) as of 2015. The company has launched a program called "écolaboration" to try to remedy the problem. The program set out with goals around recycling and sustainability. The program targets were met in 2014, and a new sustainability program, The Positive Cup, was launched. It includes goals on sustainable coffee sourcing under the Nespresso AAA Sustainable Quality Program, which was developed with the Rainforest Alliance. Nespresso claims to do this by teaching farmers best business and growing practices. Nespresso has claimed that it offers up to a 40% premium on the price of beans, and some 75,000 farmers from 12 countries are participating in the program.

In 2019, Nespresso partnered with Swedish company Vélosophy to create a commercially available bicycle out of recycled Nespresso pods. Other projects also include collaborating with Caran d'Ache to create a ball point pen out of recycled coffee pods.

Nespresso Professional, OriginalLine, and VertuoLine capsules can be recycled at one of Nespresso's recycling facilities. In 2023 Nespresso introduced paper-based coffee pods in France and Switzerland; they can be recycled with biodegradable waste.

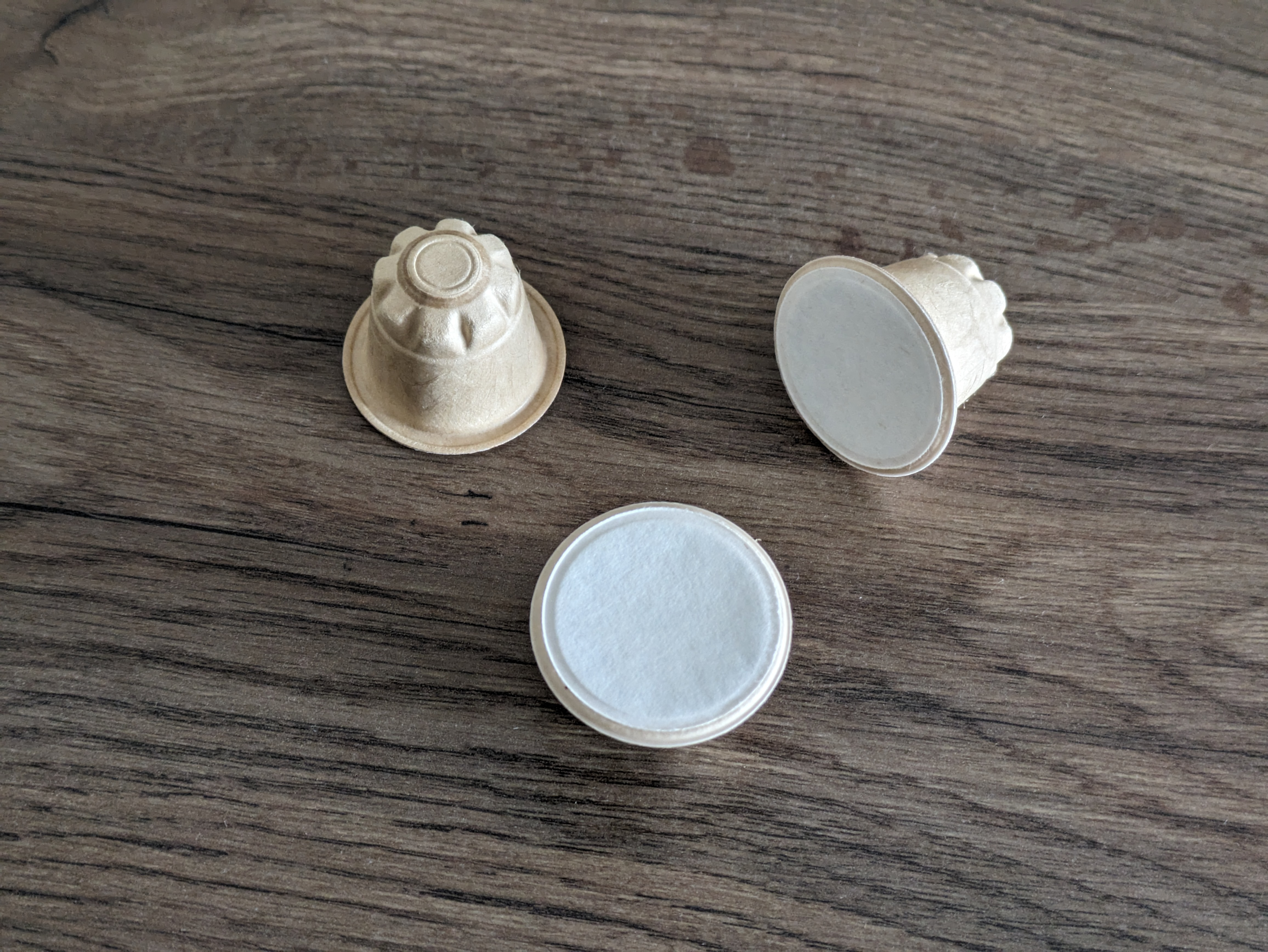
Nespresso paper pods

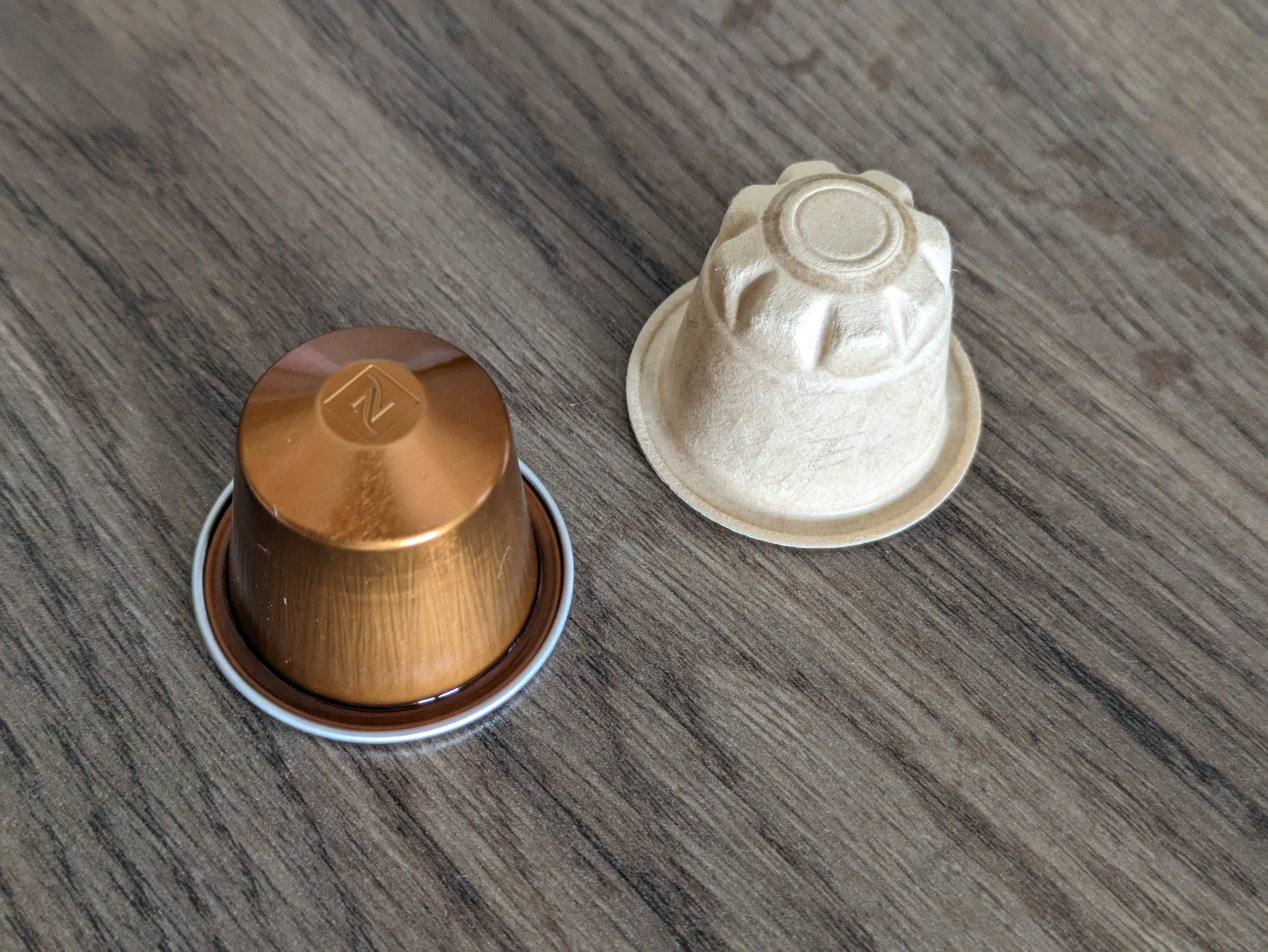
A traditional aluminium pod (left) and a paper pod (right) compared

=== Recycling bags ===
Recycling bags are provided to customers free of charge. They are available in-store and are provided with online orders of capsules. When sealed, one recycling bag can hold up to 100 Vertuo Line capsules and up to 200 Original Line capsules. The capsules do not need to be rinsed or emptied before sealing the bag. In the US and UK, customers can provide their filled bags to the same postman who delivers their order of Nespresso capsules. Or, customers can bring the full bags to a UPS Store, a Nespresso store and other drop off locations at retail partner stores. Since June 2018, Canadian customers from all provinces and territories except British Columbia and Quebec, can mail-in their full recycling bags at no extra cost through Canada Post. The residents of British Columbia and Quebec can place their full bags in their recycle bin to be picked up at their curbside with all their other household recyclables.

Nespresso expanded its product line by introducing Nespresso Bloom, its first non-coffee offerings. This range includes Coffee Blossom Honey and Coffee Blossom Honey Syrup, both harvested from the same coffee plants used in Nespresso's Master Origins Colombia capsule. These products are designed to complement Nespresso coffee and can also be used in various foods and beverages. This initiative aligns with Nespresso's commitment to sustainable coffee farming and regenerative agriculture, aiming to protect coffee crops and support pollinators like bees, which are crucial for coffee production. Developed at Nestlé's R&D Accelerator in Switzerland, the Nespresso Bloom products are initially available in limited quantities at select Nespresso Boutiques and online.

=== Grounded coffee and contaminants ===
Nespresso recognizes that its capsule coffees contain contaminants (Furane, aluminum, cobalt, chrome, tin, nickel, copper, zinc, acrylamide, and various insects) but does not officially communicate on the quantities present in each dose as well as the maximum daily doses to not exceed via consumption of these capsules.

== Litigation ==
In March 2011, the Swiss discount supermarket, Denner, won a court battle with Nestlé over the sale of plastic Nespresso-compatible capsules, at about half the retail price of Nespresso capsules.

By 2014, Nespresso had been involved in further legal disputes about pods with competitors in the UK, Germany, France, Belgium, and the Netherlands; one media report said "Nestlé has lost in just about every one of those conflicts." In France—Nespresso's largest market, which made a quarter of its global sales at the time—the antitrust watchdog Autorité de la concurrence said that "it appears that Nespresso may have abused its dominant position by tying the purchase of its capsules to that of its coffee machines, with no fair justification, de facto ousting rival capsule makers". The company agreed to cease making the warranty on its single-serving coffee machines conditional on using only Nespresso pods, and to remove warnings against the use of third-party pods.

== See also ==
- Single-serve coffee container
- Coffee wars
- Dolce Gusto
- Handpresso
- Senseo
- Caffitaly
- Keurig K-Cup Brewing System
