= White Ox =

Dutch brand of rolling tobacco

- Product type: Rolling tobacco
- Current owner: Imperial Brands (1998–)
- Country: Netherlands
- Markets: Worldwide
- Previous owners: Douwe Egberts

White Ox is a Dutch brand of rolling tobacco available worldwide. In Australia it is widely available to purchase from licensed tobacco retailers and is imported by Imperial Tobacco Australia LTD.

== History ==
Originally it was produced by Douwe Egberts in the Netherlands. In 1998 the "White Ox" brand was acquired by Imperial Tobacco when Douwe Egbert sold off its hand-rolling tobacco business. White Ox tobacco is described on the packaging as a "Superior Dark Blend" of tobaccos. In the Australian market it was sold in 30 gram and 50 gram variant pouches. In March 2014 the 30 gram pouch was discontinued from sale and a 25 gram pouch introduced. Originally the 25 gram pouch was produced in New Zealand, but from late 2017 both the 50 and 25 gram pouches are now produced in The Netherlands.

A White Ox packet, with the Australian graphic health warning

An Australian government quantitative survey of RYO smokers to "Determine Impact of Plain Packaging" found that "White Ox" tobacco was perceived by this cohort as being "extremely low appeal as a product", that was associated with "prison populations and homeless people"

Its name is shared with the name of the original store "De Witte Os" (English translation, 'The White Ox'), in Joure, the Netherlands opened in 1753 by Egbert Douwes and his wife Akke Thysses, founders of the Douwe Egberts company.

Prior to the prison smoking ban in August 2015, White Ox tobacco was the standard issue tobacco in the state of N.S.W. Australia prisons, where it was colloquially known as "Boob Shit" or "Boob Weed."

== In popular culture ==
At the conclusion of the 1992 Vogel award-winning novel PRAISE, by Andrew McGahan, the novel's protagonist uses his last $8 to purchase a pouch of White Ox tobacco.

It was also referenced in the Australian YouTube series The Big Lez Show, with character Mike Nolan saying that smoking a Marlboro Red is akin to "…smoking a White Ox no filter, fuck that for a joke", referring to the “traditional” Australian way of smoking White Ox as a rolled cigarette without a filter (a part of the brand's inseparable association with prison life).
