= Nabob (coffee) =

Brand of coffee produced by Kraft Foods

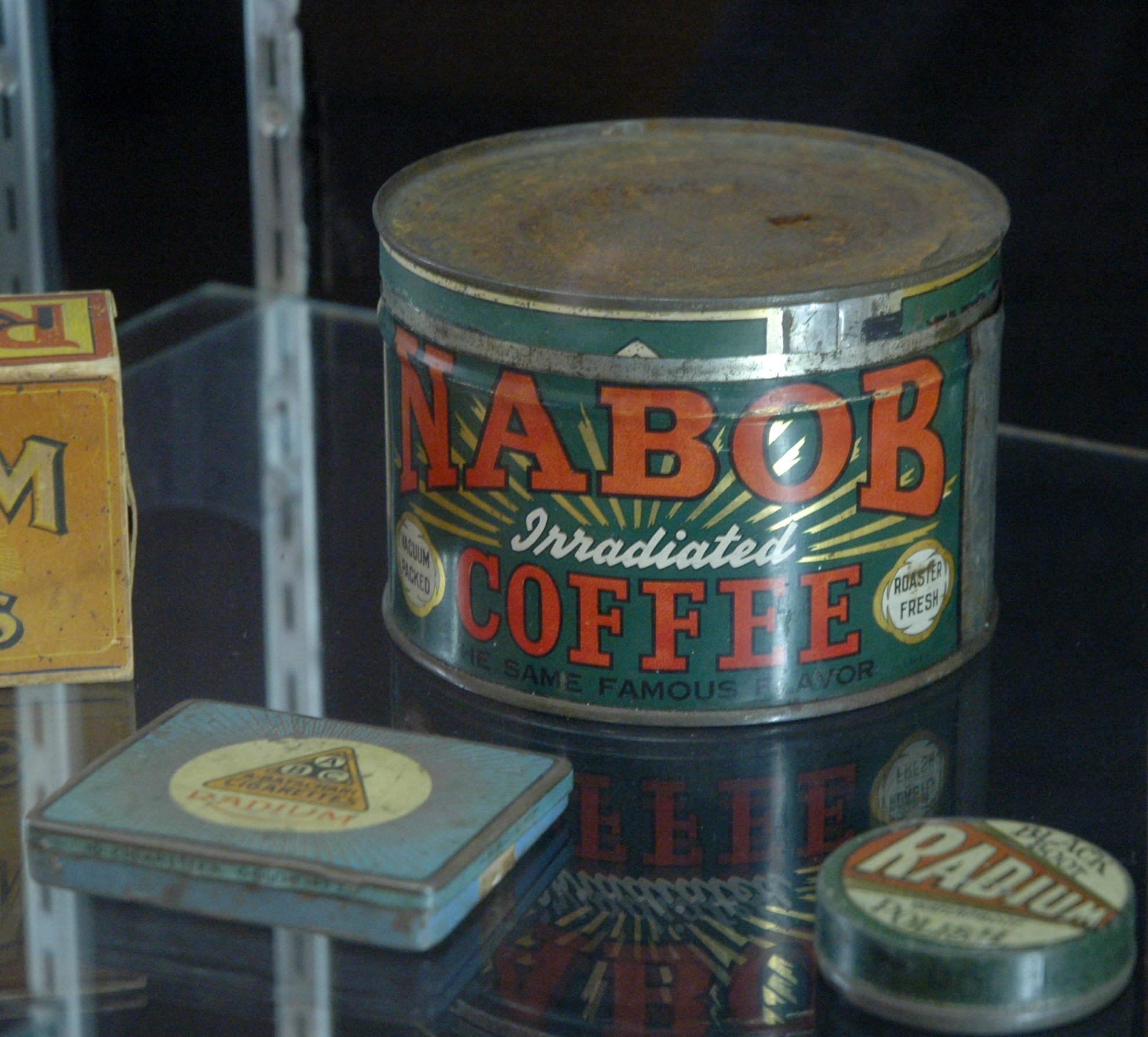
- Product type: Coffee
- Current owner: Kraft Heinz
- Country: Canada
- Introduced: 1896
- Markets: Canada
- Previous owners: Nabob Foods inc; Jacobs; Jacobs Suchard; Kraft Foods Inc.; Kraft Foods Group
- Website: kraftheinz.com/en-CA/nabob

Nabob is a brand of coffee produced and owned by Kraft Heinz and sold in Canada since 1896. Nabob produces several different blends of coffee which are available in a typical Canadian supermarket.

== History ==
The Nabob Coffee Company originated in Vancouver, British Columbia, in 1896. Its coffee was processed and packaged in the factory of food manufacturing company Kelly Douglas Limited. The name refers to the Anglo-Indian word nabob, a term for a conspicuously wealthy man who made his fortune in the Orient during the British colonial era.

Nabob was purchased by German firm Jacobs in 1976. In 1978, the new owners extended the Nabob brand into Central and Eastern Canada and by 1986 Nabob had made its way all across Canada, Quebec being the last province to receive the brand.

In 1994, the Nabob brand was purchased by Kraft Foods when Philip Morris Combined Kraft General Foods Europe with Jacobs Suchard(The owner of Nabob)to form Kraft Jacobs Suchard, Since Nabob was a North American brand owned by Jacobs Suchard, the Nabob brand was moved to Kraft General Foods.

In 2012, Kraft Foods Inc. Split into Kraft Foods Group and Mondelez International, since Kraft Foods Group retained the North american coffee brands while Mondelez retained the International Coffee brands. Nabob was moved to Kraft Foods Group and has been the only Kraft Coffee brand to be owned by Jacobs Suchard.

In 2015, Kraft Foods Group Merged with Heinz to form Kraft Heinz and today, Nabob is currently owned by Kraft Heinz

== Tassimo product development ==
Since 2006, Nabob has been the primary coffee brand for the Tassimo coffee maker in Canada. Tassimo launched its brewing system with Nabob T Discs using Tassimo's barcode concept. Nabob offers twelve different types of Tassimo discs which range from their light-bodied breakfast blend to their espresso. Nabob's lattes and cappuccinos include an extra T Disc of condensed milk product on top of Nabob's own disc.

== Blends ==
=== Dark roasts ===
- Nabob Full City Dark
- Nabob Golden Java Sumatra
- Nabob Gastown Grind
- Nabob Midnight Eclipse
- Nabob Espresso

=== Medium roasts ===
- Nabob Breakfast Blend
- Nabob 1896 Tradition
- Nabob 1896 Tradition Swiss Water Decaffeinated
- Nabob Summit 100% Colombian
- Nabob Summit 100% Colombian Swiss Water Decaffeinated
- Nabob Organic Gourmet Blend
