= Eric Favre =

Swiss engineer

Eric Favre is a Swiss engineer, best known for inventing the Nespresso system in 1976, the first single-serve coffee container.

Favre graduated from the École Polytechnique Fédérale de Lausanne and joined Nestle in 1975.

In 1976, Favre, an employee of Nestlé, invented, patented and introduced the Nespresso system. Favre was the first president of Nespresso.

In 1991, Favre launched Monodor (Now renamed as MOCOFFEE), a new patented capsule system that did not use aluminium. The patents are used under license by Lavazza and Migros.

In 2014, Favre received a Coffee Leaders Lifetime Achievement Award at the GCR Leaders Symposium in Singapore.
