= Tassimo =

Single-serve coffee system

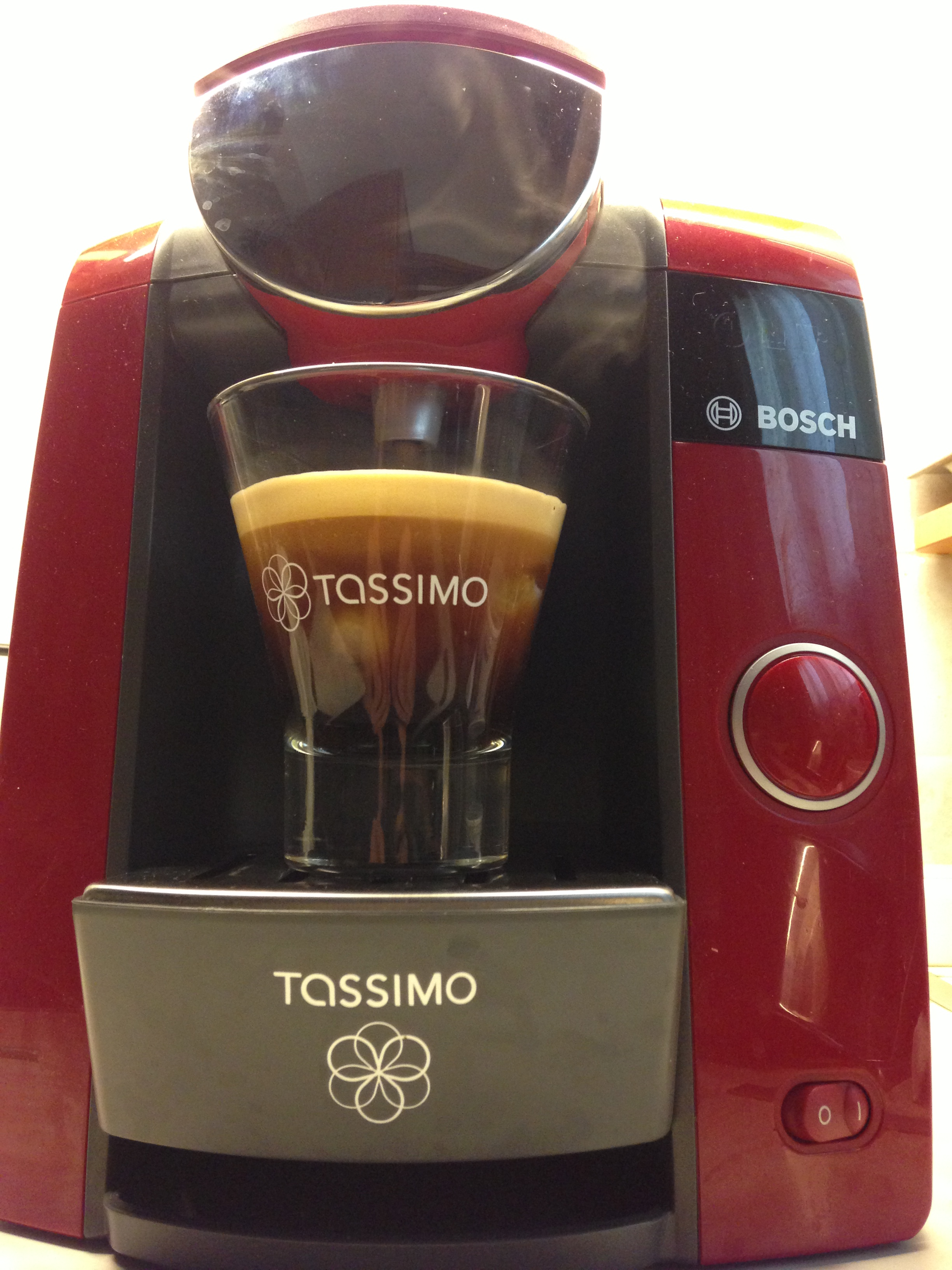
- A 2013 Tassimo Joy machine
- Product type: Beverages
- Current owner: JDE Peet's (except North America); Kraft Heinz (North America)
- Country: France
- Introduced: 2004; 22 years ago
- Markets: Worldwide
- Previous owners: Mondelez International
- Website: tassimo.com

The Tassimo Hot Beverage System is a consumer single-serve coffee system that prepares one-cup servings of espresso, regular coffee, tea, hot chocolate and various other coffee drinks, notably those including milk such as latte or cappuccino. The brand is owned by JDE Peet's in most of the world and Kraft Heinz in North America.

== History ==
First introduced in France in 2004, Tassimo is now also available in Andorra, Austria, the Czech Republic, Denmark, Germany, Greece, Ireland, the Netherlands, Norway, Spain, Sweden, Switzerland, Poland, Portugal, Romania, Russia and the United Kingdom.

The machines were originally developed by Kraft Foods. The original machines were manufactured by Saeco and distributed by Braun. In early 2008, Procter & Gamble, the parent company of Braun, began phasing out sales of Braun kitchen appliances in North America. In August 2008, it was announced the new generation of Tassimo machines would be manufactured by Bosch. At the same time, Kraft announced double-digit growth for the second quarter in a row for its Tassimo coffee T-Disc sales.

== T-Discs ==
Tassimo T-Discs

The Tassimo system utilizes proprietary non-reusable plastic beverage pods, called T-Discs, which are produced and distributed by JDE Peet's. A bar code on top of each T-Disc instructs the machine to use the proper brewing settings. It will then change the water temperature, the amount of water, and the brew time and strength. This allows the Tassimo pod maker to brew a variety of hot drinks: filtered style coffee, cappuccino, short espresso, tea, and hot chocolate. The brewing process takes between 30 and 60 seconds. Discs containing milk use UHT milk, not powdered milk, but are no longer available in the United States.

Tassimo T-Discs are currently offered under brands owned by JDE Peet's or Kraft Foods, including Gevalia, Maxwell House, Mastro Lorenzo, Nabob, Carte Noire, Jacobs, and Suchard. Not all brands are available in all markets (for example, Kraft-owned Nabob T-Discs are only available in Canada, while JDE-owned Kenco T-Discs are available in the British Isles). In some markets, Tassimo has entered into partnerships with third parties to market T-Discs from non-Kraft and non-JDE brands. In the United Kingdom, T-Discs with the Costa Coffee brand have been sold since September 2012. In Canada, T-Discs are sold under the coffee shop brands Second Cup, Tim Hortons, McCafé as well as private label supermarket brands like Irresistibles, Our Finest and President's Choice.

== Current machines ==
Tassimo offers five models of single-cup coffee maker compatible with the "home-use" T-discs. However the T46 and T65 are no longer offered for sale in the US. These models are the T20, T46, T47, T55 and T65. While varying in price, colour, availability of filter/display they are functionally equivalent in that each maker will produce the same beverage from the same t-disc.

Tassimo machines T12, T47+ and T55+ were formerly sold in Canada.

There is also a Tassimo Professional model designed for office and trade use. T DISCs designed for use in this model cannot be used in domestic Tassimo machines.

== Recall ==
On 9 February 2012 about 900,000 in Canada and 835,000 coffee makers the United States were recalled after reports of the brewers spraying hot liquid, coffee grounds or tea leaves onto people. Reports from the US Consumer Product Safety Commission say that there have been 140 reports on the maker, 37 of those cases involve second degree burns. The commission has also recalled 4 million T-Discs over reports that they can burst while brewing.

Customers who participated in the coffee maker recall were shipped a replacement component which will help prevent the contents of a defective T-Disc from spraying if the T-Disc bursts. The component was shipped free of charge, including instructions to allow customers to insert the new component themselves.

== See also ==
- Single-serve coffee containers
- Caffitaly
- Flavia Beverage Systems
- Kenco Singles
- Keurig
- Lavazza
- Nespresso
- Senseo
