= Handpresso =

French manufacturer of espresso machines

Handpresso SAS
- Company type: Espresso machine manufacturer
- Industry: Domestic and professional espresso machines
- Founded: 2006
- Headquarters: Fontainebleau
- Products: Espresso machines
- Website: www.handpresso.com

Handpresso SARL is a French manufacturer of portable espresso machines. In 2006, the handpresso SARL was founded in Fontainebleau by Henrik Nielsen. Nielsen established handpresso SARL as a derivative of Nielsen Innovation SARL. Handpresso WILD ESE was the first handheld espresso maker and it is sold in 25 countries. The first Handpresso machines were designed for E.S.E. coffee pods. Handpresso WILD ESE is of Danish design.

In 2008, Handpresso won seven international design prizes, including IF and Formland.

In 2012, the company launched the "Handpresso Auto", an espresso machine for the car.

In 2013, the Handpresso Wild Hybrid achieved the "National Geographic's Gear of the Year" award.

== Technology ==
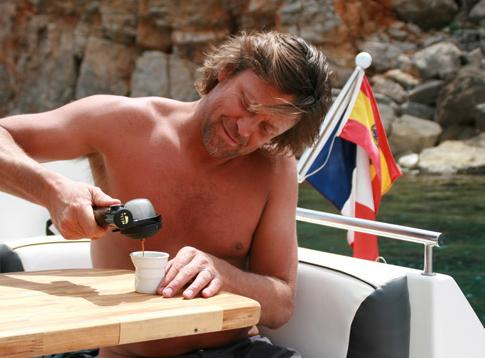
A Handpresso espresso maker in use

The Handpresso Wild works by pumping the Handpresso unit up to 16 bar pressure. Hot water is then added from a kettle or a thermo flask to the 50 ml reservoir, and an E.S.E. pod or Domepod (ground coffee) inserted before serving the coffee at the push of a button. The infusion is stopped by pushing the button back. During the infusion the pressure drops in from 11 to 8 bar pressure.

The temperature of the water is very important for the final result. When freshly boiled water from a kettle is used, the water temperature is about 203 °F (95 °C) when it gets in contact with the coffee. The water from a thermo flask is usually cooler, but temperatures down to 176 °F (80 °C) still gives an acceptable result with most coffees.

Handpresso has filed several international patents.
