= Caffitaly =

Espresso making system

The Caffitaly logo is used to identify compatible coffee makers and capsules

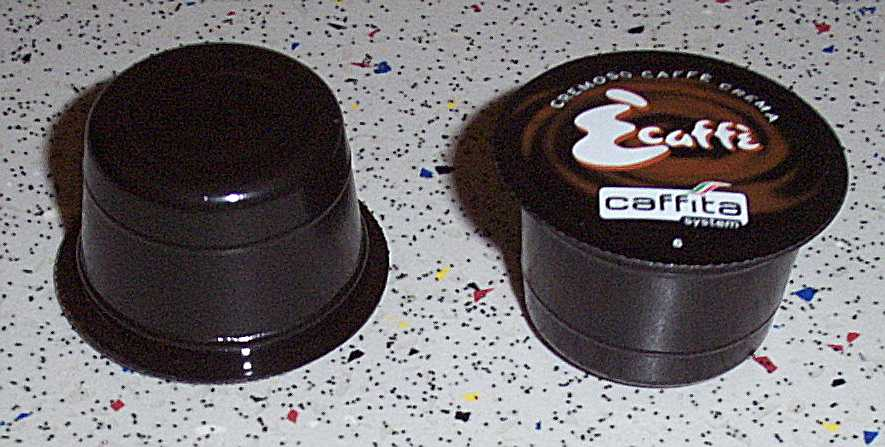
Caffitaly capsules. The machine pierces the top (right) and bottom (left) of the capsule, and the water is forced through it under pressure

The Caffitaly System (known in some markets as the Caffita System) is a capsule system for making espresso and other coffee drinks in home espresso machines. The name is a portmanteau of caffè, the Italian word for coffee, and Italy. Caffitaly is based in Bologna, Italy.

Caffitaly was developed by Caffita System SpA and has been adopted by other manufacturers, notably Bewley's of Ireland, Princess of the Netherlands, Germany's Tchibo, Julius Meinl, Dallmayr, Italy's Caffé Cagliari S.p.A., Crem Caffe, Swiss Chicco D'oro, Três Corações in Brazil, USA's Coffee Bean & Tea Leaf, Australia's MAP Coffee and Israeli Espresso Club as well as Löfbergs in Sweden. It is similar in principle to the competing Nespresso and Tassimo capsule systems, in which a sealed capsule containing a premeasured amount of coffee is inserted into the machine, through which hot water is forced at high pressure into a coffee cup. The capsule can be disposed of easily once the coffee is made, and the machine requires little maintenance or cleaning.

Like similar proprietary coffee-making systems, Caffitaly can be seen as an example of the razor and blades business model, in which the relatively low price of the coffeemaker is recouped through a higher profit margin on the coffee capsules it uses.

Caffita sponsored the Lampre–Caffita cycling team in 2005.

Caffitaly Systems also produces the CBTL Capsule System for The Coffee Bean & Tea Leaf and the MAP Italian Coffee Capsule System for Map Coffee Australia.

Danesi of Italy meanwhile has associated themselves with Caffitaly system brewing machines, selling in the USA through Boston King Coffee. In Australia, Woolworths and Gloria Jeans promote and make their own capsules exclusively for the system, with the latter also selling Gloria Jeans branded machines. Coles also currently make their own capsules for the machine under the "Mr. Barista" brand name.
