= Coffeehouse =

Establishment that serves coffee

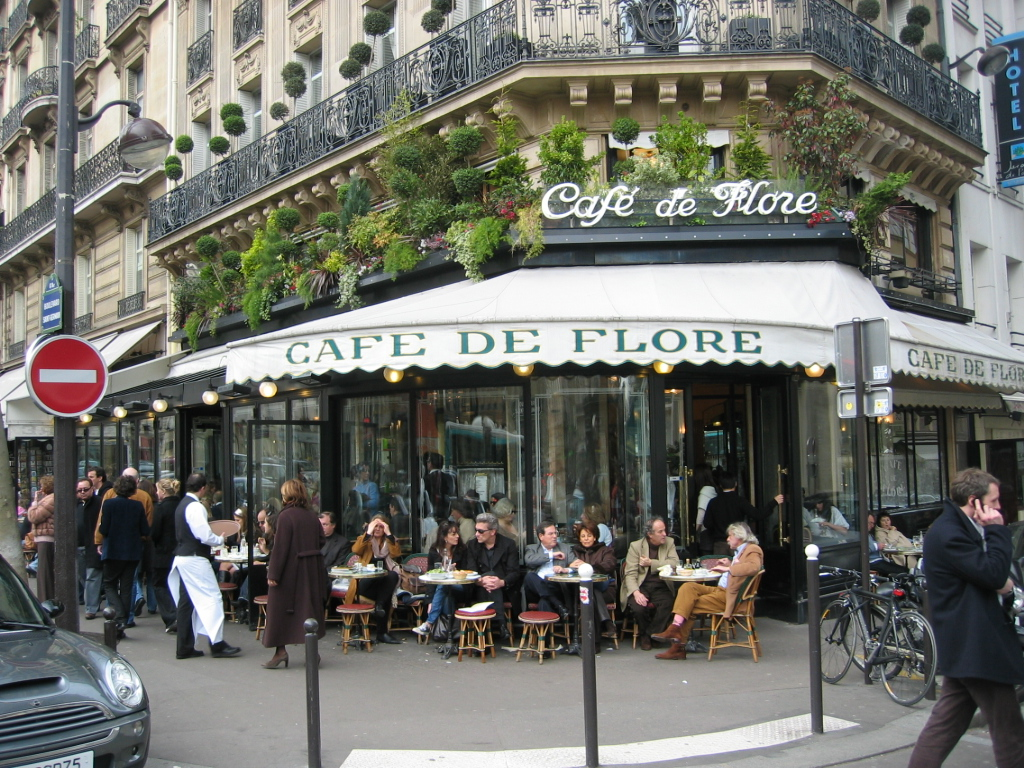
The Café de Flore on the Rive Gauche in Paris is one of the oldest coffeehouses in the city. Its famous clientele included writers and philosophers.

A coffeehouse, coffee shop, or café, is an establishment that serves various types of coffee drinks like espresso, latte, americano, and cappuccino, as well as other beverages. An espresso bar specializes in serving espresso and espresso-based drinks. Some coffeehouses may serve iced coffee among other cold drinks, as well as non-caffeinated drinks. A coffeehouse may also serve food, such as light snacks, sandwiches, muffins, cakes, breads, pastries, or doughnuts. Many doughnut shops in Canada and the US serve coffee to accompany doughnuts, so these can also be classified as coffee shops, although doughnut shops tend to be more casual and serve cheaper fare (suiting take-out and drive-through, popular in those countries). In continental Europe, some cafés even serve alcoholic drinks, and in West Asia, coffeehouses may offer a flavored tobacco smoked through a hookah, called shisha in most varieties of Arabic or nargile in Levantine Arabic, Greek, and Turkish.

While café may mean a coffeehouse, it tends to have a different meaning in Britain: a diner or "greasy spoon"; it is also used for a teahouse or other casual eating and drinking place. A coffeehouse may resemble a bar or restaurant, but differs from a cafeteria (a canteen, a restaurant without table service). Coffeehouse operation ranges from management of an independent venue by its owner to franchises of a large multinational corporation.

From a cultural standpoint, a coffeehouse largely serves as a center of social interaction: it provides patrons with a place to meet, talk, read, write, entertain one another, or pass the time, whether individually or in small groups. A coffeehouse can serve as an informal social club for its regular members. From as early as the 1950s Beatnik era and the 1960s folk music scene, coffeehouses have hosted singer–songwriter performances, typically in the evening. The digital age saw the rise of the Internet café along similar principles.

== Etymology ==
The word for coffee in various European languages

The Arabic word qahwa (قهوة) is the origin of the Italian caffè (first attested as caveé in Venice in 1570), from which the English coffee and French café both derive. The Arabic term originally meant a type of wine, but after the wine ban by Islam, the name was transferred to coffee, thought to have a similar rousing effect. European knowledge of coffee (the plant, its seeds, and the drink made from the seeds) came through European contact with Turkey, likely via Venetian–Ottoman trade relations.

Café (French: [kafe]) is the French word for both coffee and coffeehouse; it was adopted (as /ˈkæfeɪ/) by English-speaking countries in the late 19th century. The Italian spelling, caffè, is also sometimes used in English. In Southern England, especially around London in the 1950s, the French pronunciation was often facetiously altered to /kæf/ and spelt caff. (Note: In the opinion of one author: "['Caff'] smacks too much of slumming it, of class tourism. ... I think it's occasionally acceptable to say it, but it's demeaning to cafe-owners to write it all the time.")

The English word café to describe a place that serves coffee and snacks (rather than the drink itself) is derived from the French café. The first café in France is believed to have opened in 1660. Meanwhile, the first café in Europe is believed to have been opened in Belgrade, Ottoman Serbia in 1522 as a Kafana (Serbian coffeehouse).

The translingual word root /kafe/ appears in many European languages with various naturalized spellings, including Portuguese and French (café); German (Kaffeehaus or Café); Swedish (kafé or fik); Finnish (kahvila); Spanish (cafetería); Italian (caffè or caffetteria); Polish (kawa); Serbian (кафа / kafa); Ukrainian (кава (kava)); Turkish (kahvehane).

== Early history ==
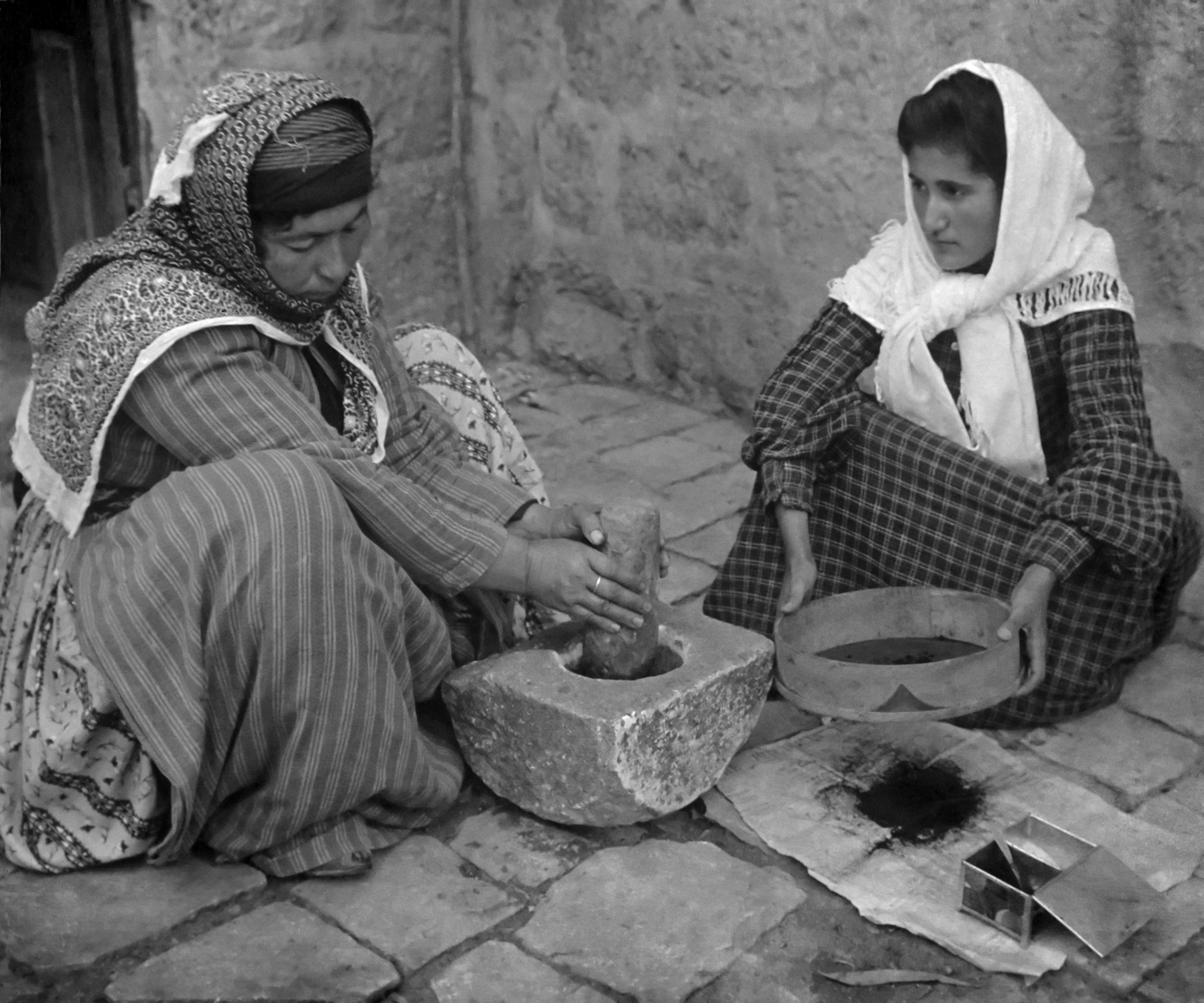
Palestinian women grinding coffee beans

Early forms of the beverage now known as coffee were consumed in Yemen, where Sufi orders used qahwa to maintain wakefulness during nighttime dhikr recitations. This early coffee-based beverage was named after the port city of Mokha, from which coffee beans were first exported to the other parts of the Arab world. Yemen was once one of the world's major producers and exporters, with "Mocha" coffee. Yemeni traders played a crucial role in spreading both the beverage and its associated rituals, contributing to its growing popularity across the Islamic world.

In the 15th century, coffee cultivation and consumption began in Yemen, where merchants transformed it into a lucrative and commercial product. The beans, often sourced from the Ethiopian Highlands, were roasted, ground, and brewed in a method that closely resembles modern coffee preparation. By the early 16th century, coffee spread northward to Mecca, Cairo, and Damascus, where coffeehouses — known as maqāhī (مقاهي) became popular meeting places.

=== Ottoman Empire ===
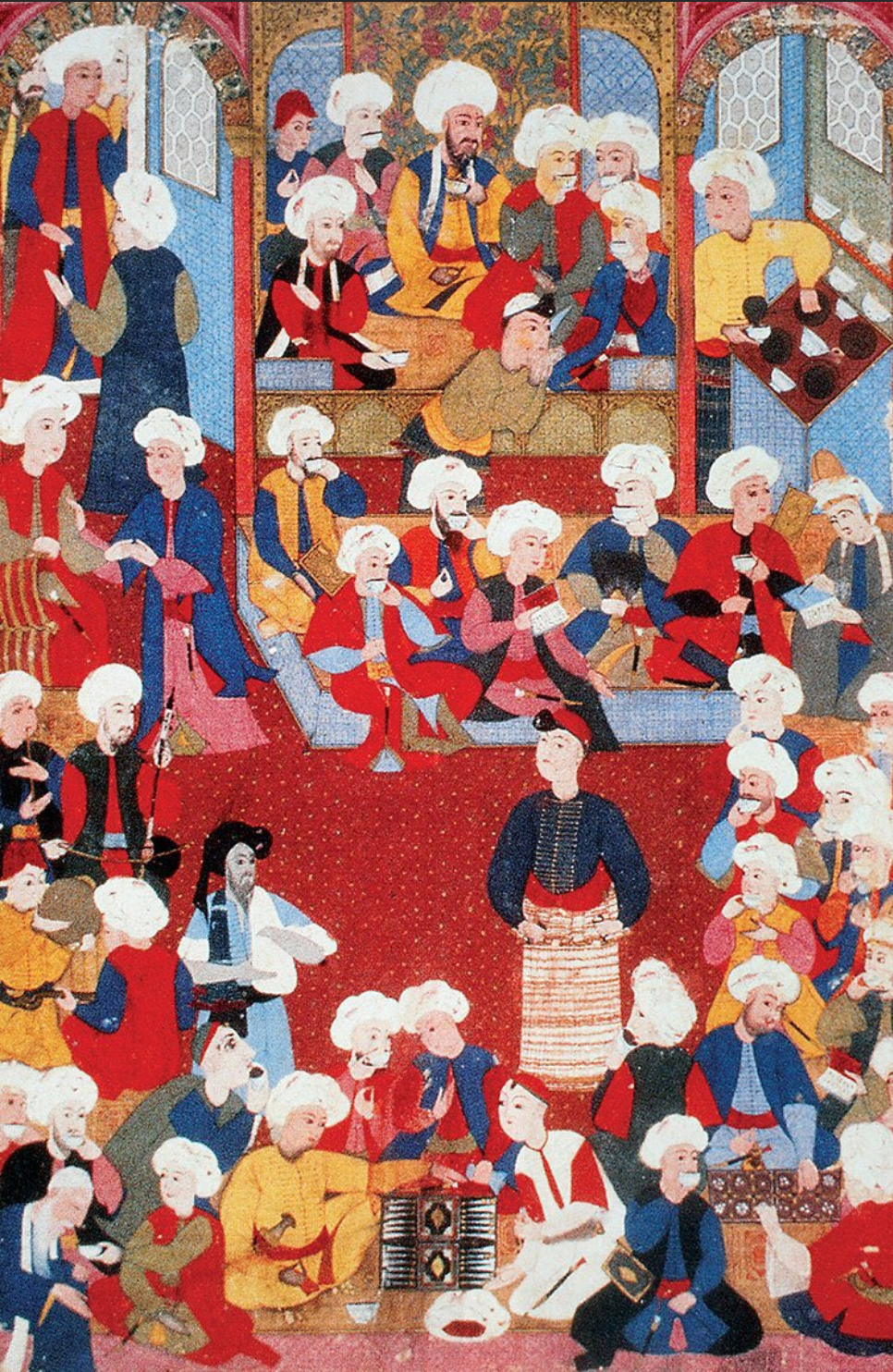
Ottoman miniature of a meddah performing at a coffeehouse

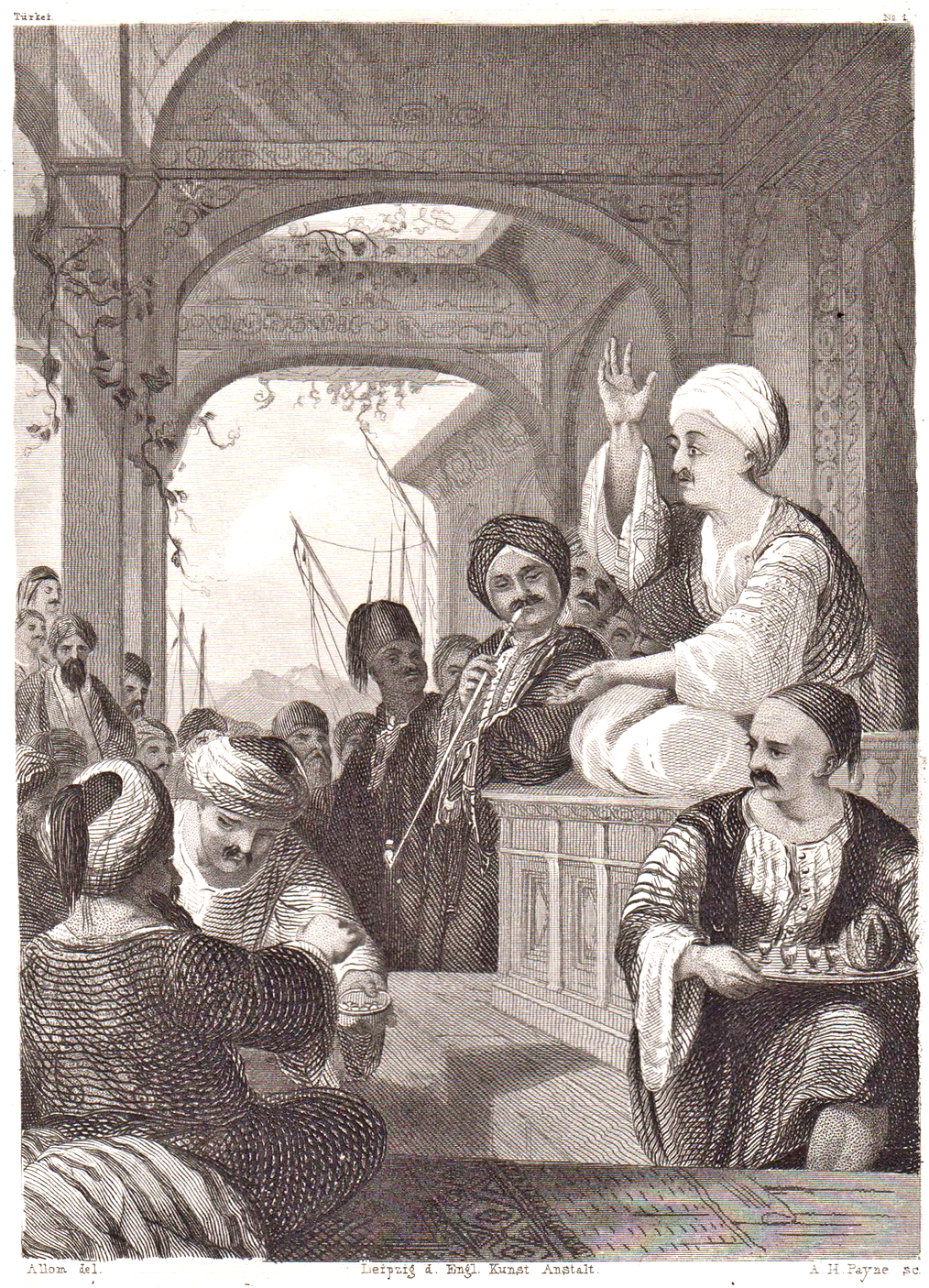
Storyteller (meddah) at a coffeehouse in the Ottoman Empire. The first coffeehouses appeared in the Muslim world in the 15th century.

The first coffeehouses appeared in Damascus. These coffeehouses also made their way to Mecca, in the Arabian Peninsula in the 15th century, then spread to the Ottoman Empire's capital of Istanbul, when two Arab merchants, Hakem of Aleppo and Shems of Damascus, opened the first coffeehouse in the Tahtakale district in the 16th century and to Baghdad.

Coffeehouses became popular meeting places where people gathered to drink coffee, have conversations, play board games such as chess and backgammon, listen to stories and music, and discuss news and politics. They became known as "schools of wisdom" for the type of clientele they attracted, and their free and frank discourse.

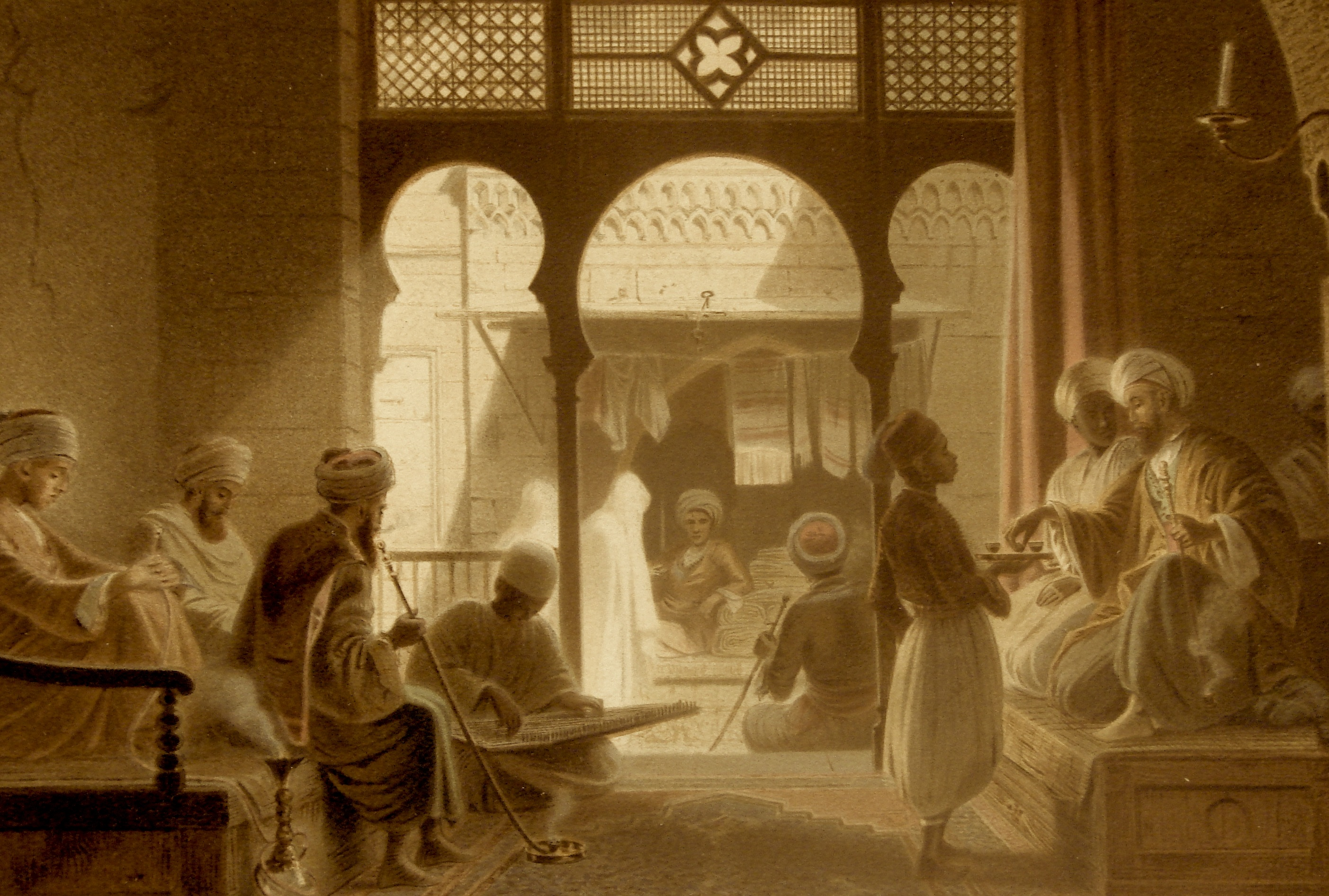
A coffeehouse in Cairo, 18th century

Coffeehouses in Mecca became a concern of imams, who viewed them as places for political gatherings and drinking, leading to bans between 1512 and 1524. However, these bans could not be maintained, as coffee became ingrained in daily ritual and culture among Arabs and neighboring peoples. The Ottoman chronicler İbrahim Peçevi reports in his writings (1642–49) about the opening of the first coffeehouse (kiva han) in Constantinople:

Until the year 962 [1555], in the High, God-Guarded city of Constantinople, as well as in Ottoman lands generally, coffee and coffeehouses did not exist. About that year, a fellow called Hakam from Aleppo and a wag called Shams from Damascus came to the city; they each opened a large shop in the district called Tahtakale, and began to purvey coffee.

=== Iran ===
The 17th-century French traveler and writer Jean Chardin gave a lively description of the Persian coffeehouse (qahveh khaneh in Persian):

People engage in conversation, for it is there that news is communicated and where those interested in politics criticize the government in all freedom and without being fearful, since the government does not heed what the people say. Innocent games ... resembling checkers, hopscotch, and chess, are played. In addition, mollas, dervishes, and poets take turns telling stories in verse or in prose. The narrations by the mollas and the dervishes are moral lessons, like our sermons, but it is not considered scandalous not to pay attention to them. No one is forced to give up his game or his conversation because of it. A molla will stand up in the middle, or at one end of the qahveh-khaneh, and begin to preach in a loud voice, or a dervish enters all of a sudden, and chastises the assembled on the vanity of the world and its material goods. It often happens that two or three people talk at the same time, one on one side, the other on the opposite, and sometimes one will be a preacher and the other a storyteller.

=== Mughal Empire ===
Consumption of Turkish coffee is attested to in the Mughal court, and appears in Mughal art from the 16th century, as is the existence of qahwakhanas (coffeehouses) in Shahjahanabad (Old Delhi).

== Modern history ==
=== Europe ===
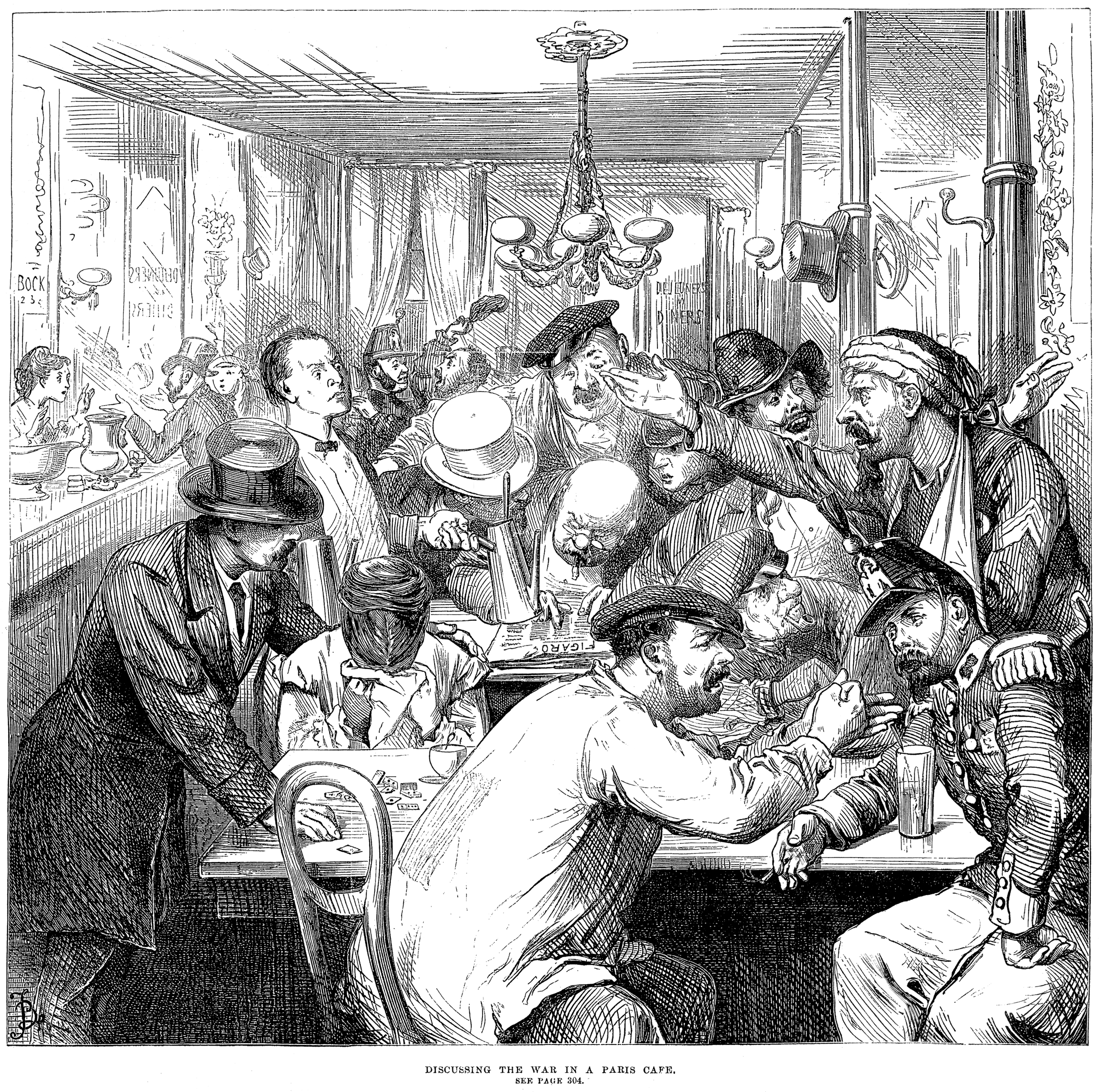
"Discussing the War in a Paris Café", The Illustrated London News, 17 September 1870, during the Franco-Prussian War

In the 17th century, coffee appeared for the first time in Europe outside the Ottoman Empire, and coffeehouses were established, soon becoming increasingly popular. The first public coffeehouse in Europe proper was opened in Belgrade, year 1521 and shortly after the city fell to the Ottomans. It was followed by coffeehouse in Sarajevo, at then lively part of the town called Bentbaša, around year 1532. Bentbaša was on the route of caravans and was thus a popular meeting point. Outside Ottoman Empire in Europe, first coffeehouse is said to have appeared in 1632 in Livorno, Italy, founded by a Jewish merchant, or in 1640, in Venice. In the 19th and 20th centuries in Europe, coffeehouses were very often meeting places for writers and artists.

==== Austria ====
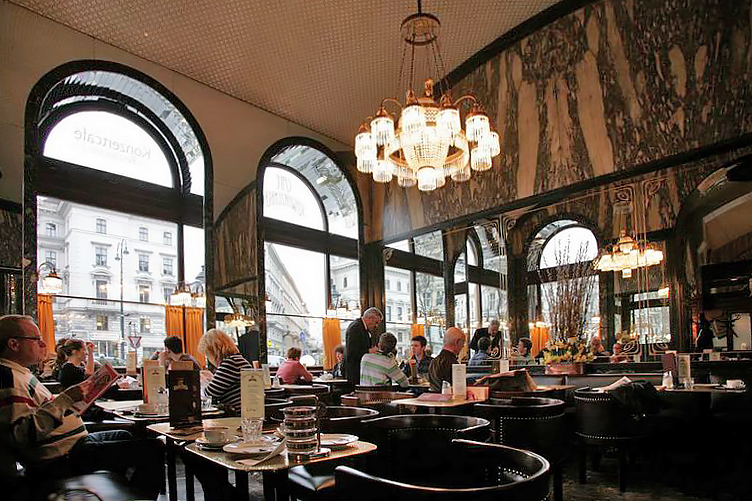
A Viennese café

The traditional tale of the origins of the Viennese café begins with the mysterious sacks of green beans left behind when the Turks were defeated in the Battle of Vienna in 1683. All the sacks of coffee were granted to the victorious Polish king, Jan III Sobieski, who in turn gave them to one of his officers, Jerzy Franciszek Kulczycki (also known as Georg Kolschitzky), a Ukrainian Cossack and Polish diplomat of Ruthenian descent. Kulczycki, according to the tale, then began the first coffeehouse in Vienna with the hoard, also being the first to serve coffee with milk.

However, it is now widely accepted that the first Viennese coffeehouse was actually opened by an Armenian merchant named Johannes Diodato (also known as Johannes Theodat) in 1685. Fifteen years later, four other Armenians owned coffeehouses. The culture of drinking coffee was itself widespread in the country in the second half of the 18th century.

Over time, a Viennese coffeehouse culture developed. Writers, artists, musicians, intellectuals, bon vivants, and their financiers met, and new coffee varieties were served. People played cards or chess, worked, read, thought, composed, discussed, argued, observed and just chatted. Much information was also obtained, because local and foreign newspapers were freely available to all customers. This form of coffeehouse culture spread throughout the Habsburg Empire in the 19th century.

Scientific theories, political plans, and artistic projects were worked out and discussed in Viennese coffeehouses all over Central Europe. James Joyce enjoyed his coffee in a Viennese coffeehouse on the Adriatic Sea in Trieste, then and now the main port for coffee and coffee processing in Italy and Central Europe. From there, the Viennese Kapuziner coffee developed into today's cappuccino. This special multicultural atmosphere of the Habsburg coffeehouses was largely destroyed by the later Nazism and communism and today can only be found in a few places that have long been in the slipstream of history, such as Vienna or Trieste.

==== England ====
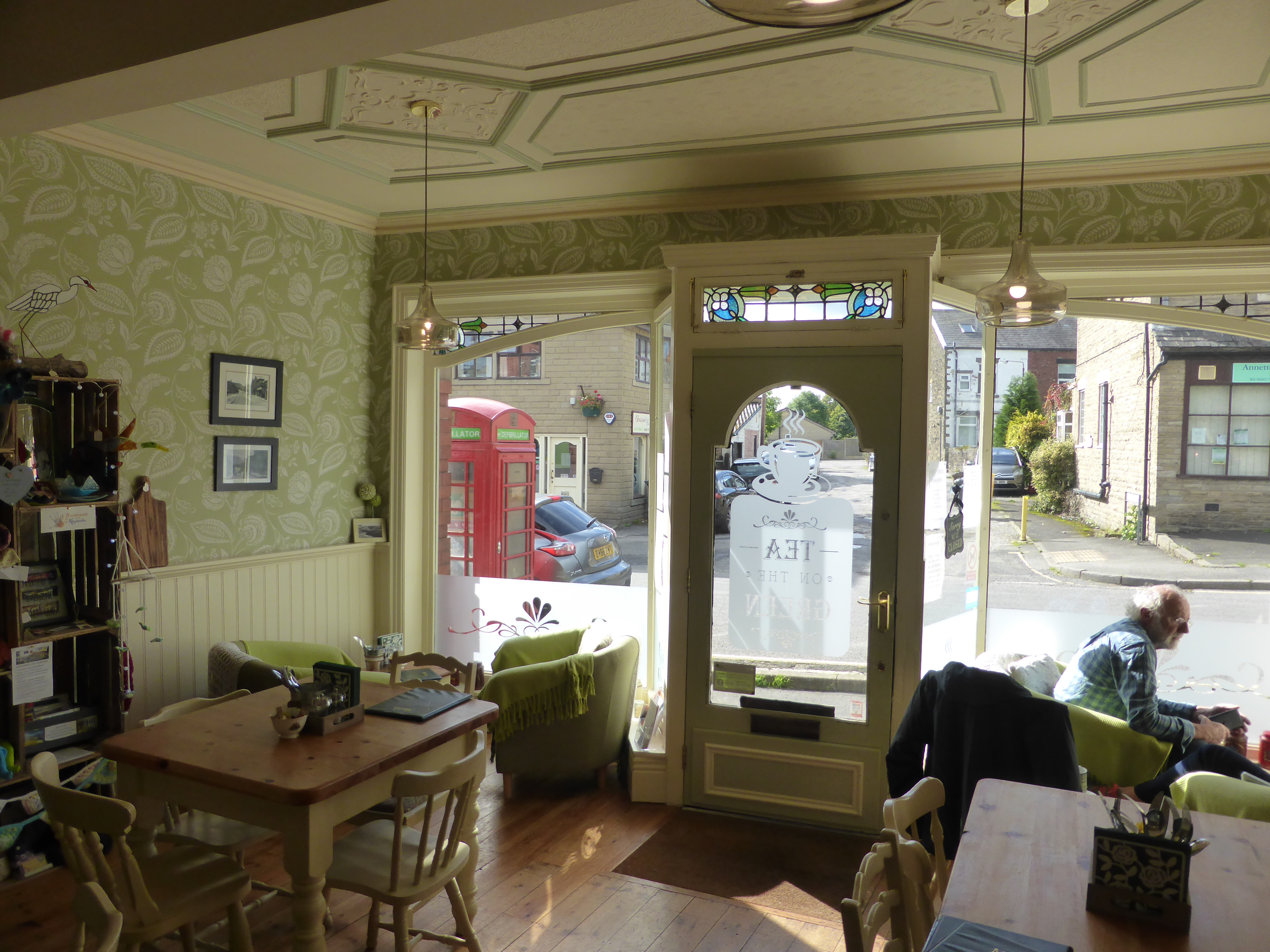
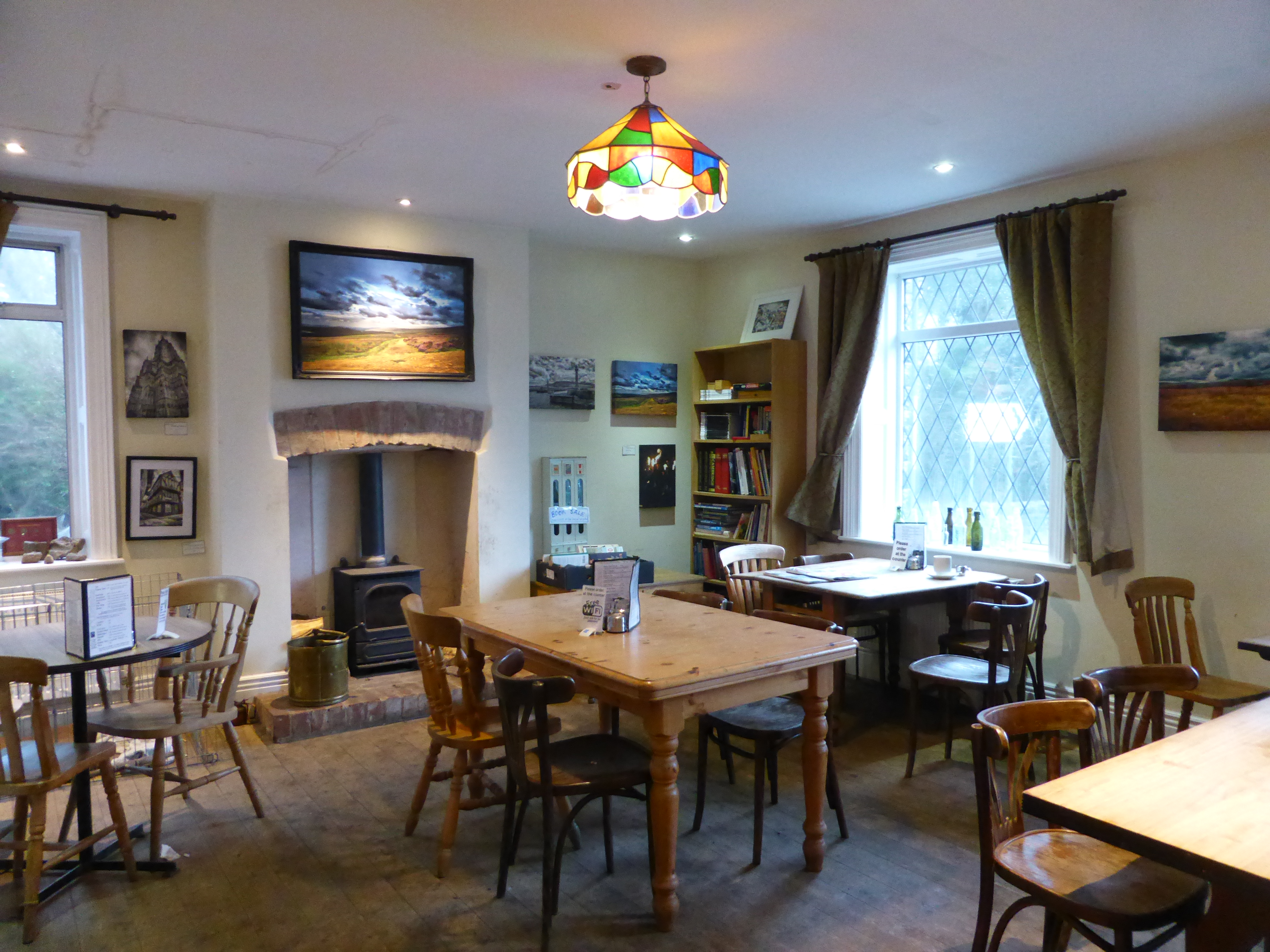
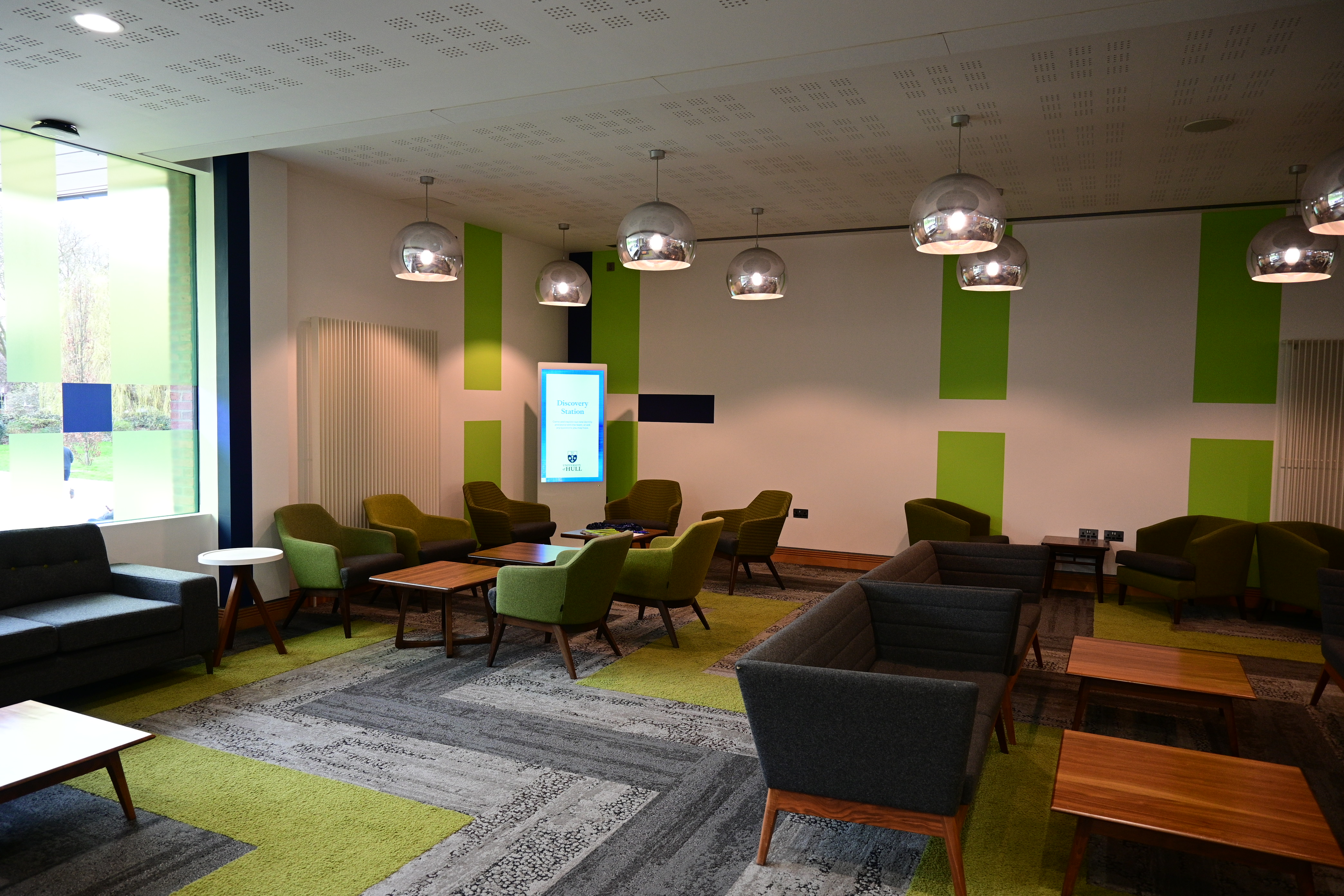
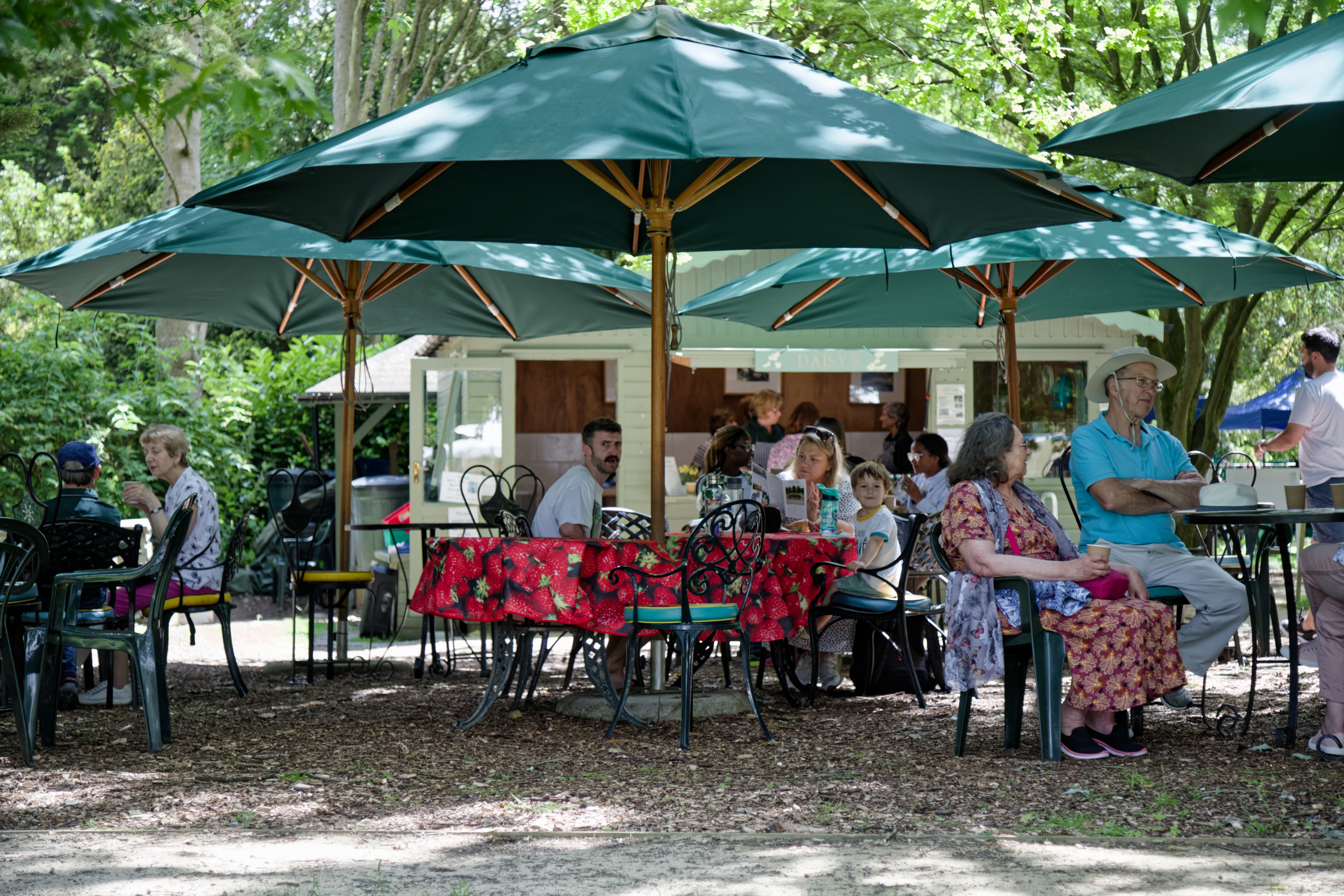
Various cafés in England

The first coffeehouse in England was opened on the High Street (on the site of the later Grand Café) in Oxford in 1650 or 1651 by "Jacob the Jew". A second, competing coffeehouse was opened across the street (on the site of the later Queen's Lane Coffee House) in 1654, by "Cirques Jobson, the Jew". In London, the earliest coffeehouse was established by Pasqua Rosée (described as Greek, Armenian, or Turkish) in 1652. Anthony Wood observed of the coffeehouses of Oxford in 1674 "The decay of study, and consequently of learning, are coffy houses, to which most scholars retire and spend much of the day in hearing and speaking of news, in speaking vilely of their superiors." Pasqua Rosée was the servant of a trader in goods from the Ottoman Empire named Daniel Edwards, who imported the coffee and assisted Rosée in setting up the establishment there.

From 1670 to 1685, London coffeehouses began to increase in number, and also in political importance due to their popularity as places of debate. For the first several years, London's coffeehouses were the preserve of "a well-educated and commercial elite", but from the 1660s their popularity increased. By 1675, there were more than 3,000 coffeehouses in England; and in London alone there were perhaps 550 at their 18th-century peak. Many men found a coffeehouse a convenient place for doing business, holding consultations there and having mail for them sent there, as well as keeping up with news. The coffeehouses were great social levelers, open to all men and indifferent to social status, and as a result associated with equality and republicanism. Entry gave access to books or print news. The rich intellectual atmosphere of early London coffeehouses was available to anyone who could pay the sometimes one penny entry fee, giving them the name "penny universities".

Though Charles II tried to suppress coffeehouses (Note: Not only those of London, but instead those of "this Kingdom, the Dominion of Wales, and the Town of Berwick upon Tweed"; and the sale of not only coffee but also chocolate, sherbet or tea.) as places where the "Idle and disaffected persons" met, and where "divers False, Malitious and Scandalous Reports are devised and spread abroad, to the Defamation of His Majesties Government", the public still flocked to them. For several decades following the Restoration, the wits gathered around John Dryden at Will's Coffee House, in Bow Street (although Jonathan Swift was unimpressed). As coffeehouses were believed to be areas where anti-government gossip could easily spread, Queen Mary II and the London City magistrates tried to prosecute people who frequented coffeehouses as they were liable to "spread false and seditious reports". William III's privy council also suppressed Jacobite sympathizers in the 1680s and 1690s in coffeehouses as places that they believed harbored plotters against the regime.

By the early 18th century, different coffeehouses attracted different clienteles, divided by occupation or opinion, such as Tories and Whigs, wits and stockjobbers, merchants and lawyers, booksellers and authors, men of fashion or the "cits" of the City. According to one French visitor, Abbé Prévost, "You read [in coffeehouses] for two-pence all the papers for or against the administration", and they were "the seats of English liberty".

Coffeehouses not only boosted the popularity of print news culture, they also helped the growth of various financial markets including insurance and stocks. Lloyd's Coffee House was where underwriters of ship insurance met to do business, leading to the establishment of Lloyd's of London insurance market and other related businesses. In 1773 the stockbrokers who had been meeting at New Jonathan's Coffee-house renamed it "The Stock Exchange".

By the 1750s, the English consumption of tea had overtaken that of coffee. As tea could be easily prepared at home, newspapers were cheap, and there was a greater variety of places for leisure and entertainment, there was no obvious demand for publicly available teahouses. Later in the century, coffeehouses tended, via pricing and memberships, to cater for only a richer clientele, and "the death of coffee-house culture was assured".

In Victorian England, the temperance movement set up coffeehouses (also known as coffee taverns) for the working classes, as a place of relaxation free of alcohol, an alternative to the public house.

==== Finland ====
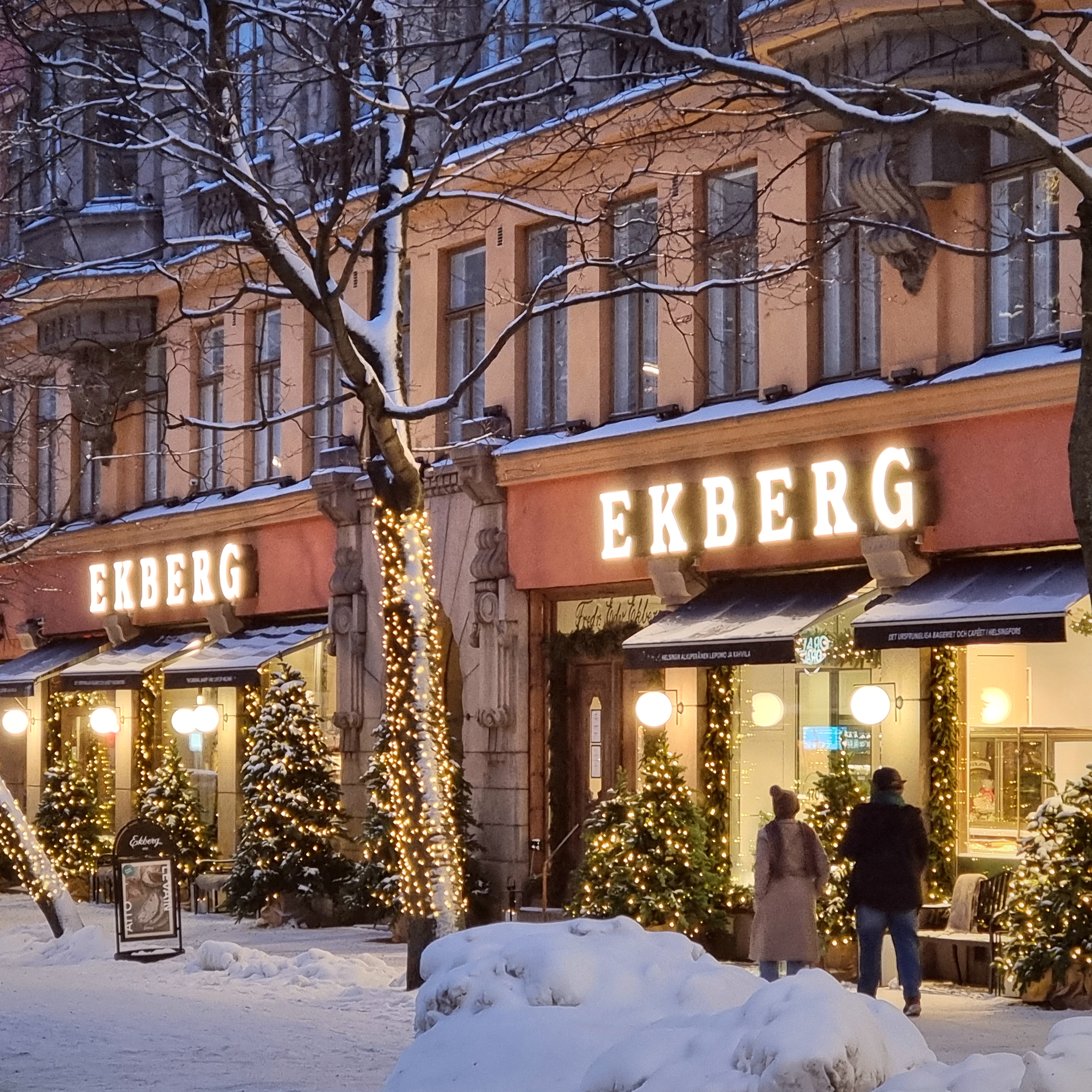
Café Ekberg in Helsinki in 2024

Finland's first coffeehouse, Kaffehus, was founded in Turku in 1778. The oldest coffeehouse still operating in Helsinki, Café Ekberg, was founded in 1852.

==== France ====
When Soliman Aga (sent to Versailles in 1669 by Sultan Mehmed IV) returned home, a member of his retinue, Pascal, remained and sold coffee from a stall at the market of Saint-Germain-des-Prés. He soon thereafter opened a coffeehouse in Paris, on the Quai de l'École near the Pont Neuf, and others from the Near East rivaled him. But the fad for Turquerie soon ended.

"[I]t was not until the establishment of the Café de Procope in 1689 that coffee found a truly Parisian expression". Owned by the Sicilian Procopio Cutò (François Procope), this was a popular meeting place of the French Enlightenment; the Encyclopédie (1751–1772) of Diderot and D'Alembert is said to have had its start in conversations there between the two.

The issue of slavery had a profound effect on the pre-Revolutionary thinkers who gathered at the Café Procope in Paris, including Montesquieu, Rousseau, and Diderot. The ethics of the slave trade were discussed whilst its very fruits were consumed, a dark liquid produced by dark skins in the depths of dark despair. Diderot wrote that the trade "is a business which violates religion, morality, natural law, and all human rights", whilst Rousseau railed against the supposed right to enslave as "absurd and meaningless".

In its decor too, Café Procope had a lasting influence. Procopio had installed wall mirrors, marble-topped tables, and more that he had had removed from a bath-house that he had bought, thereby establishing what has become a convention for many other European cafés.

==== Hungary ====
The first known cafés in Pest date back to 1714 when a house intended to serve as a café (Balázs Kávéfőző) was purchased. Minutes of the Pest City Council from 1729 mention complaints by the Balázs café and Franz Reschfellner café against the Italian-originated café of Francesco Bellieno for selling underpriced coffee.

==== Ireland ====
In the 18th century, Dublin coffeehouses functioned as early reading centers and the emergence of circulation and subscription libraries that provided greater access to printed material for the public. The connection of the coffeehouse with virtually every aspect of the print trade was evidenced by the incorporation of printing, publishing, selling, and viewing of newspapers, pamphlets and books on the premises, most notably for Dick's Coffee House, owned by Richard Pue; thus contributing to a culture of reading and increased literacy. These coffeehouses were social magnets where different strata of society joined to discuss topics covered by the newspapers and pamphlets. Most coffeehouses of the 18th century would eventually be equipped with their own printing presses or incorporate a bookshop.

==== Italy ====
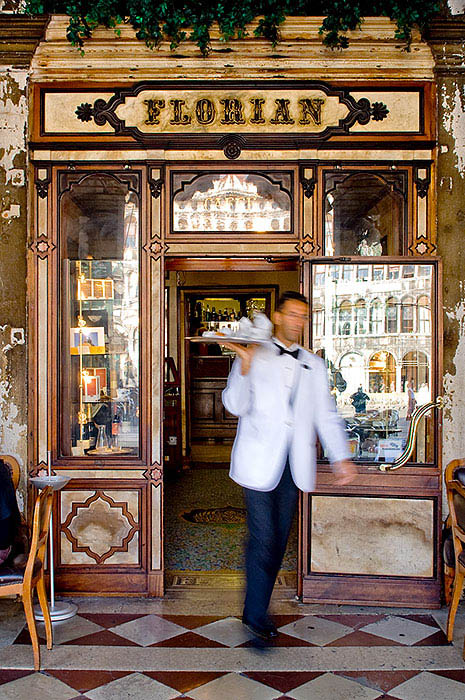
Caffè Florian in Venice

The first café in Venice opened in 1683 under the Procuratie Nuove of Piazza San Marco. The concept was popular:

On [Piazza San Marco] alone in the eighteenth century there were, under the Procuratie Vecchie, the following cafés: the Re di Francia, the Abbondanza, Pitt l'eroe, the Regina d'Ungheria, the Orfeo, the Redentore, the Coraggio, the Speranza, the Arco Celeste and Quadri opened in 1775 by Giorgio Quadri of Corfù, who was the first to serve genuine Turkish coffee. Under the Procuratie Nuove were the Angelo Custode, the Duca di Toscana, the Buon genio, the Doge, the Imperatore, the Imperatrice della Russia, the Tamerlano, the Fontana di Diana, the Dame Venete, the Aurora, the Piante d'oro, the Arabo, the Piastrelle, the Pace, the Venezia trionfante, and Florian, opened in 1720 by Floriano Francesconi.

During the 18th century, the oldest extant coffeehouses in Italy were established. Venice aside, these included Antico Caffè Greco (circa 1760) in Rome, Caffè Pedrocchi in Padua, Caffè dell'Ussero in Pisa, and Caffè Fiorio in Turin.

==== Netherlands ====
Coffeehouses (koffiehuizen) emerged in the Dutch Republic in the mid-17th century following the introduction of coffee through expanding trade networks with the Middle East and the Ottoman Empire. The earliest documented references to coffee-related establishments in the Netherlands date to the early 1660s, particularly in Amsterdam. One of the earliest known coffeehouses in the country is recorded in The Hague, where a coffeehouse reportedly opened on the Korte Voorhout in 1664. At this time, coffee was a luxury commodity, primarily consumed by wealthier groups, while traditional beverages such as beer remained dominant. By the late 17th century, coffeehouses had become established in major Dutch cities, including Amsterdam, where contemporary sources indicate the presence of multiple coffee sellers and dedicated establishments. These venues also functioned as social spaces for conversation, gaming, and the exchange of news and information. Coffeehouses in the Dutch Republic formed part of a broader European development in which such establishments contributed to urban sociability and the circulation of public discourse.

==== Portugal ====
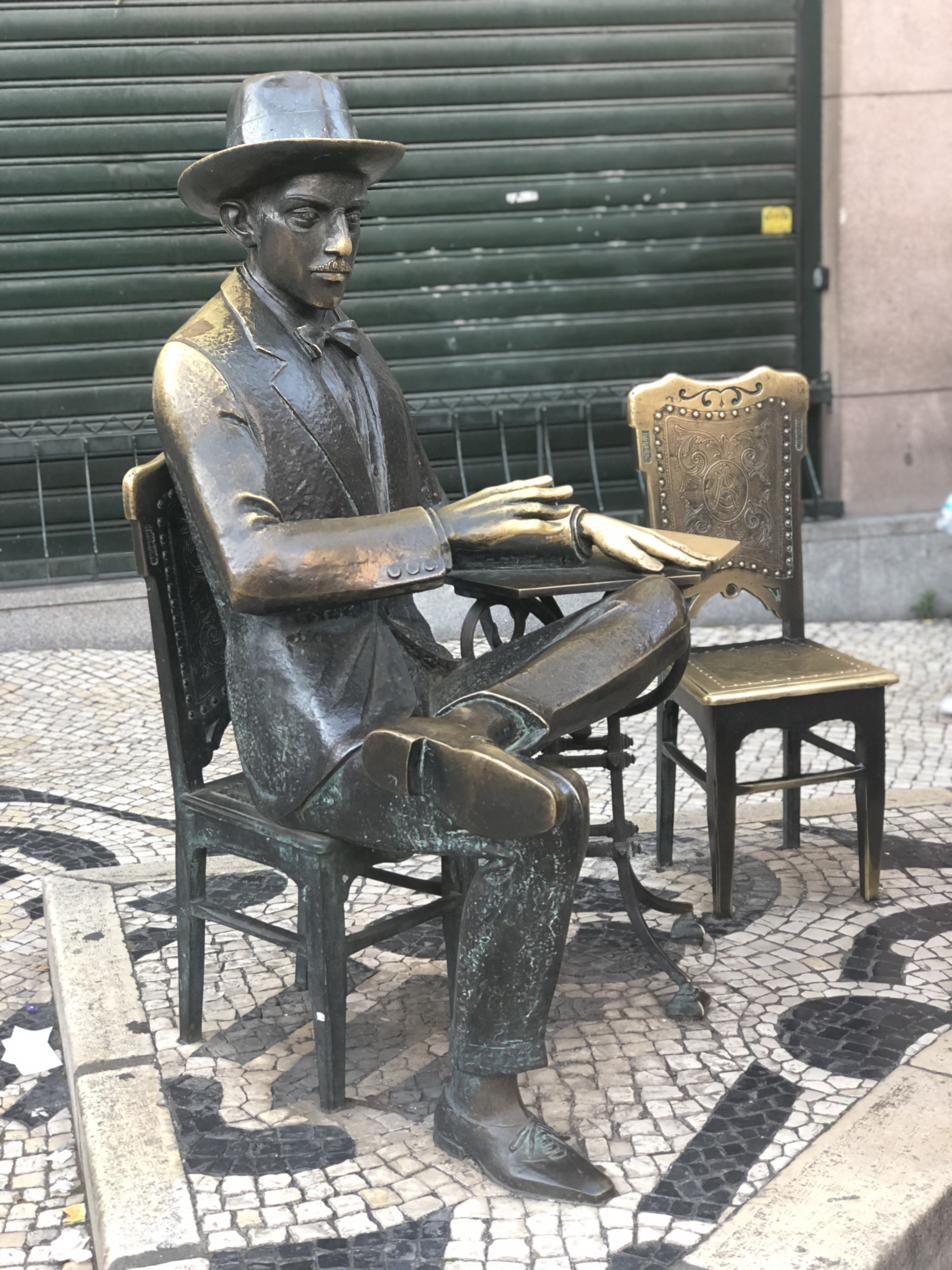
Statue of Fernando Pessoa by Lagoa Henriques, next to the A Brasileira café, in Chiado, Lisbon

The history of coffee in Portugal is usually said to have begun during the reign of king John V, when Portuguese agent Francisco de Melo Palheta supposedly managed to steal coffee beans from French Guiana and introduce it to Brazil. From Brazil, coffee was taken to Cape Verde and São Tomé and Príncipe, which were also Portuguese colonies at the time. Despite this story, coffee already existed in Angola, having been introduced by Portuguese missionaries. During the 18th century, the first public cafés appeared, inspired by French gatherings from the 17th century, becoming spaces for cultural and artistic entertainment.

Several cafés emerged in Lisbon such as: Martinho da Arcada (the oldest café still operating, having opened in 1782), Café Tavares, and Botequim Parras. Of these, several became famous for harboring poets and artists, such as Manuel du Bocage with his visits to Café Nicola, opened in 1796 by the Italian Nicola Breteiro; and Fernando Pessoa with his visits to A Brasileira, opened in 1905 by Adriano Teles. The most famous was the Café Marrare, opened by the Neapolitan Antonio Marrare, in 1820, and frequently visited by Júlio Castilho, Raimundo de Bulhão Pato, Almeida Garrett, Alexandre Herculano and other members of the Portuguese government and the intelligentsia. It began its saying: Lisboa era Chiado, o Chiado era o Marrare e o Marrare ditava a lei (English: 'Lisbon was the Chiado, the Chiado was the Marrare and the Marrare dictated the law').

Other coffeehouses soon opened across the country, such as Café Vianna, opened in Braga, in 1858, by Manoel José da Costa Vianna, and visited by important Portuguese writers such as Camilo Castelo Branco and Eça de Queirós. During the 1930s, a surge in coffeehouses happened in Porto with the opening of several that still exist, such as Café Guarany, opened in 1933, and A Regaleira, opened in 1934.

==== Romania ====
In 1667, Kara Hamie, a former Ottoman Janissary from Constantinople, opened the first coffee shop in the center of Bucharest (then the capital of the Principality of Wallachia). On its site today stands the main building of the National Bank of Romania.

==== Switzerland ====
In 1761, the Turm Kaffee, a shop for exported goods, was opened in St. Gallen.

==== Gender ====
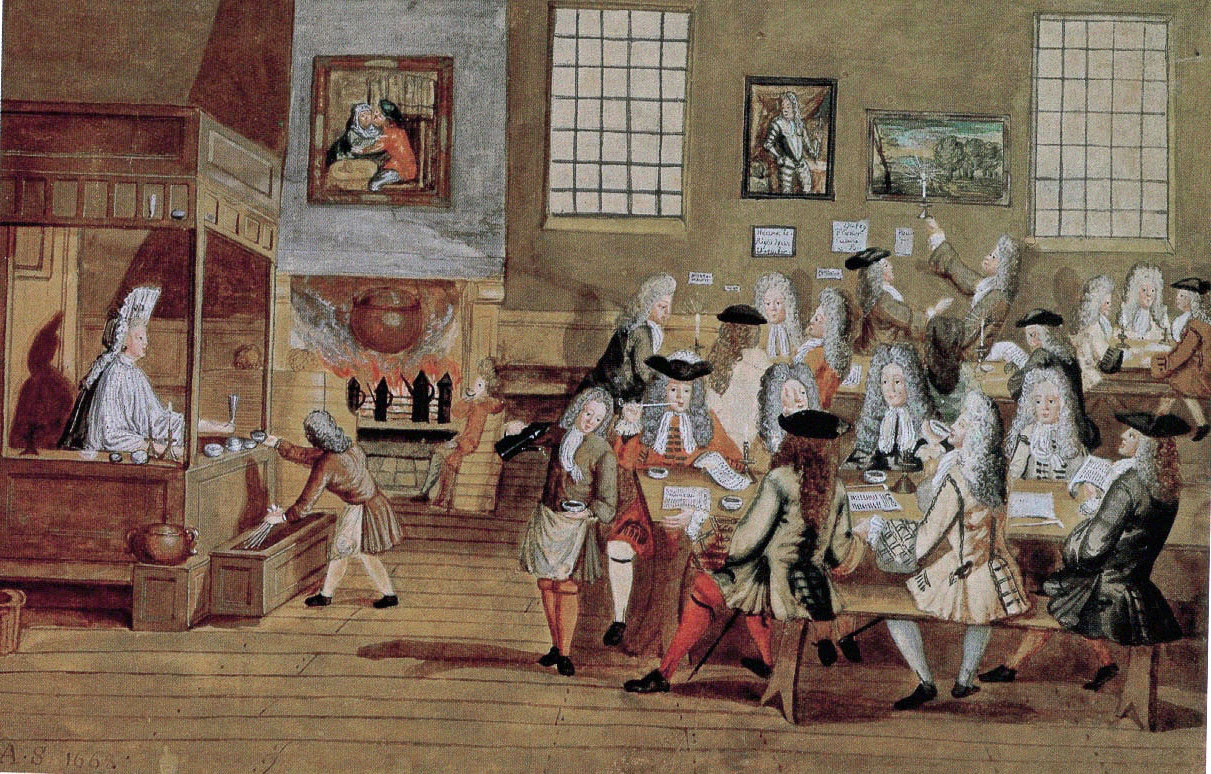
An English café at the close of the 17th century: men hang their hats on pegs and sit at long communal tables strewn with papers and writing implements. Coffee pots are ranged at an open fire, with a hanging cauldron of boiling water. The only woman present is separated in a canopied booth, from which she serves coffee in tall cups.

The exclusion of women from coffeehouses as guests was not universal, but does appear to have been common in Europe. In Germany, women frequented them, but in England and France they were banned in the mid-17th century. Émilie du Châtelet reportedly cross-dressed to gain entrance to the Café Gradot, in Paris.

Women did work as waitresses at coffeehouses and also owned and managed coffeehouses. Well-known women in the coffeehouse business were Moll King in England and Maja-Lisa Borgman in Sweden.

=== Americas ===
==== Argentina ====
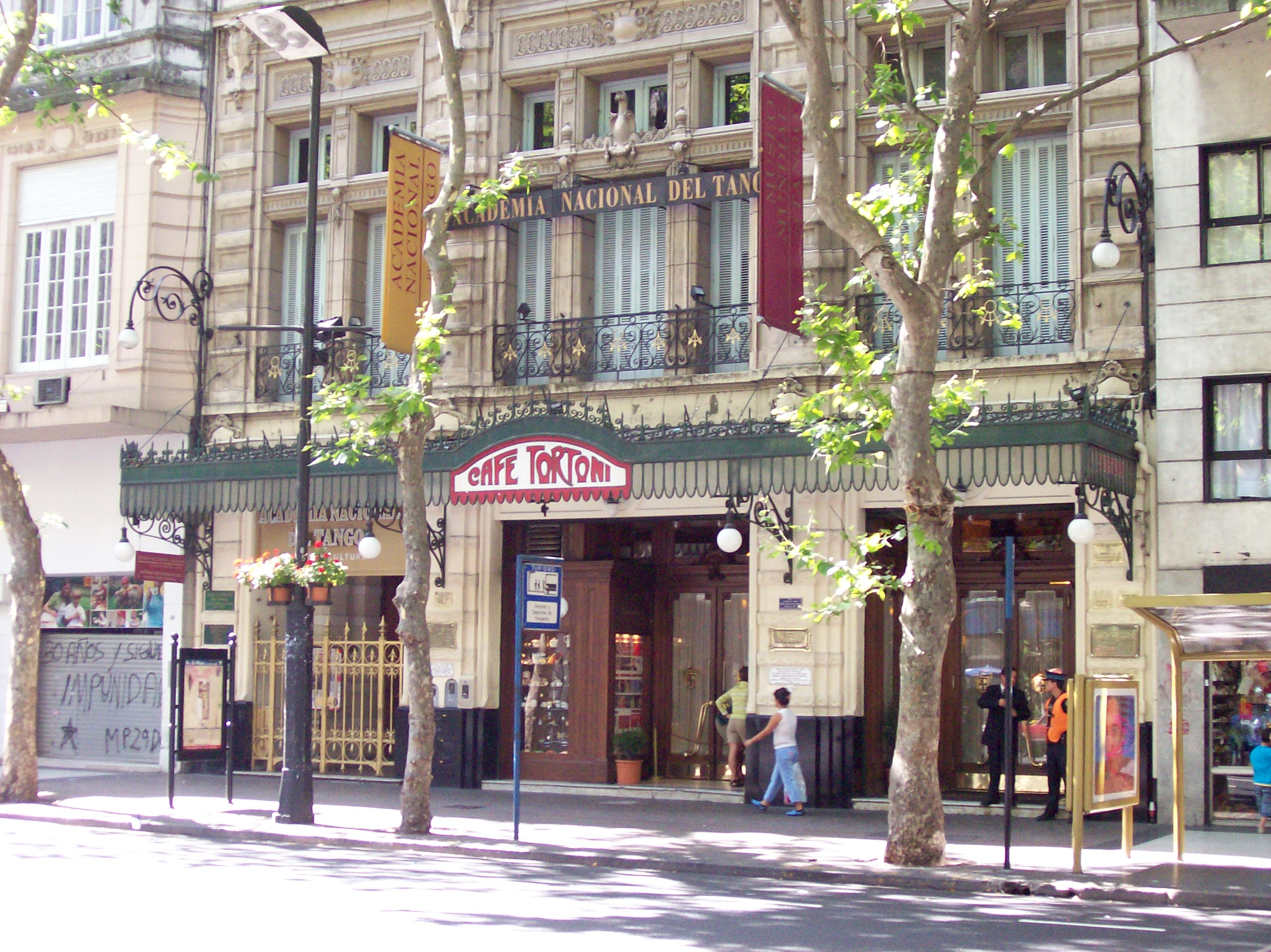
Café Tortoni is a café in Buenos Aires frequented by Jorge Luis Borges among other public figures.

Coffeehouses are part of the culture of Buenos Aires and the customs of its inhabitants. They are traditional meeting places for porteños and have inspired innumerable artistic creations. Some notable coffeehouses include Confitería del Molino, Café Tortoni, El Gato Negro, and Café La Biela.

==== Mexico ====
Menu boards for cacao and mocha drinks at Tierra Garat, Mexico City, 2026

The first coffee house in Mexico City, Café Manrique, opened in 1798 at Tacuba and Empedradillo (now Monte de Piedad) streets. Coffeehouses became established by the mid-1800s as third spaces for soldiers, writers and politicians. Later, the "cafés de chinos", first opened by Chinese immigrants in the first half of the 20th century, were and are known for their café con leche and pan dulce (pastries). and were known for their café con leche and sweet bread. Domestic coffeehouse chains include Cielito Querido Café, Café Punta del Cielo, Sede Café, and Tierra Garat, which has an extensive menu of chocolate and hybrid chocolate-with-coffee drinks. Starbucks is also present with 951 stores as of mid-2026, of which about 280-290 in Greater Mexico City.

==== United States ====
The first coffeehouse in the United States opened in Boston, in 1676. However, Americans did not start choosing coffee over tea until the Boston Tea Party and the Revolutionary War. After the Revolutionary War, Americans briefly went back to drinking tea until after the War of 1812 when they began importing high-quality coffee from Latin America and expensive inferior-quality tea from American shippers instead of Great Britain. Whether they were drinking coffee or tea, coffeehouses, like those in Great Britain, were places where business was done. In the 1780s, Merchant's Coffee House on Wall Street in New York City was home to the organization of the Bank of New York and the New York Chamber of Commerce.

Coffeehouses in the United States arose from the espresso- and pastry-centered Italian coffeehouses of the Italian American immigrant communities in the major U.S. cities, notably New York City's Little Italy and Greenwich Village, Boston's North End, and San Francisco's North Beach. From the late 1950s onward, coffeehouses also hosted entertainment, most commonly folk performers during the American folk music revival. Both Greenwich Village and North Beach became major haunts of the Beats, who were highly identified with these coffeehouses. As the youth culture of the 1960s evolved, non-Italians consciously copied these coffeehouses. The political nature of much of 1960s folk music made the music a natural tie-in with coffeehouses with their association with political action. A number of well-known performers like Joan Baez and Bob Dylan began their careers performing in coffeehouses. Blues singer Lightnin' Hopkins bemoaned his woman's overindulgence in coffeehouse socializing in his 1969 song "Coffeehouse Blues".

In 1966, Alfred Peet began applying the dark roast style to high quality beans and opened up a small shop in Berkeley, California to educate customers on the virtues of good coffee. Starting in 1967 with the opening of the Last Exit on Brooklyn coffeehouse, Seattle became known for its thriving countercultural coffeehouse scene; the Starbucks chain later standardized and mainstreamed this espresso bar model, now prevalent throughout the country.

In the 21st century, North American usage has increasingly distinguished between the terms "coffee shop" and "café" based on their operational models and revenue streams. While often used interchangeably in casual speech, a coffee shop is typically characterized by a focus on "extraction" (beverages), counter service, and high-volume throughput. In contrast, a café often functions as a hybrid between a restaurant and a traditional coffeehouse, prioritizing seated dining and a higher average transaction value. This distinction is further defined by physical infrastructure; cafés often require full commercial kitchen licensing, including grease traps and high-capacity ventilation for meal preparation, whereas coffee shops frequently operate under "light food" licenses that prioritize the espresso machine as the central focal point of the space.

From the 1960s through the mid-1980s, churches and individuals in the United States used the coffeehouse concept for outreach. They were often storefronts and had names like The Lost Coin (Greenwich Village), The Gathering Place (Riverside, CA), Catacomb Chapel (New York City), and Jesus for You (Buffalo, NY). Christian music (often guitar-based) was performed, coffee and food provided, and Bible studies convened as people of varying backgrounds gathered in a casual setting that was purposefully different from traditional churches.

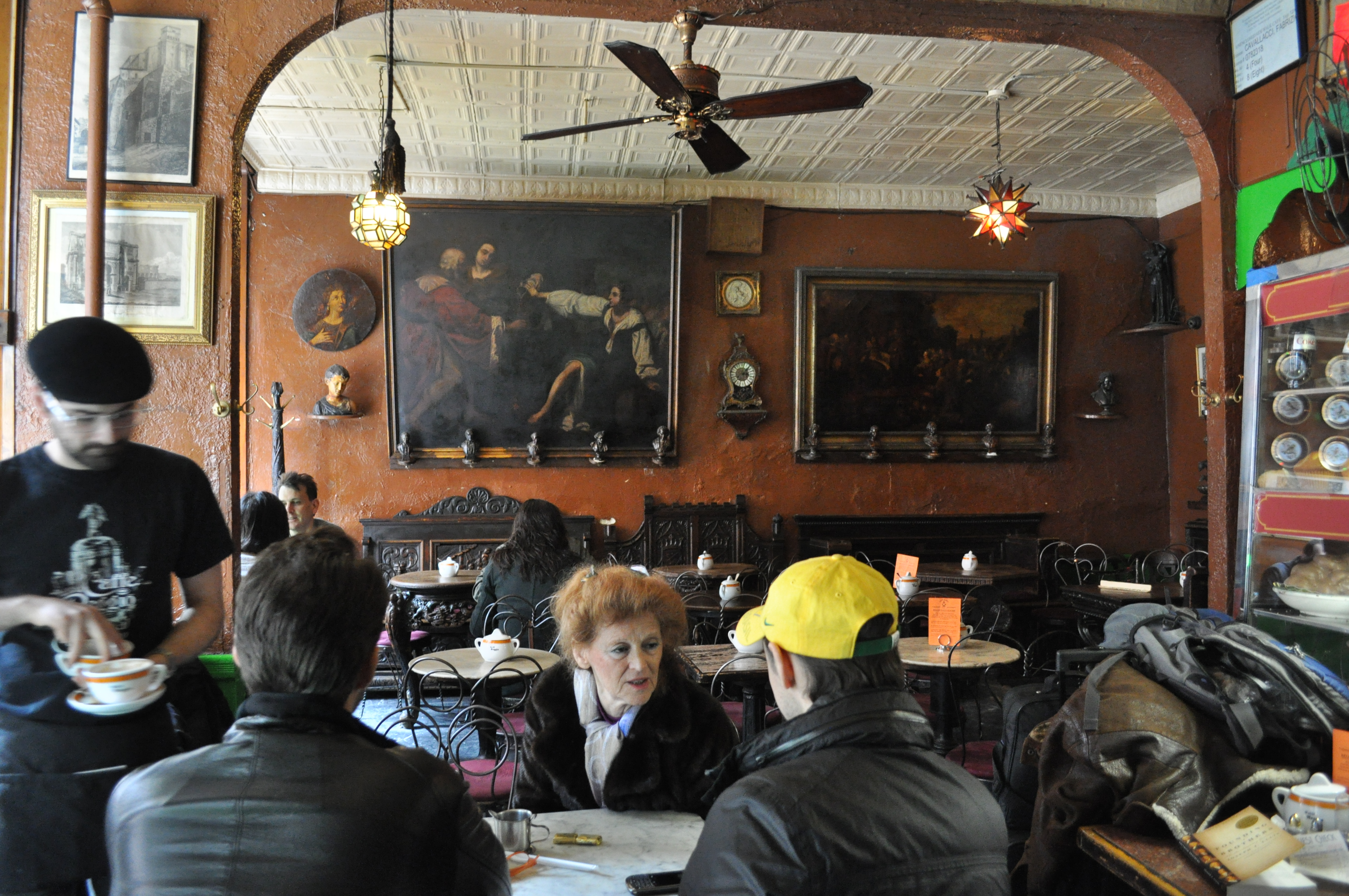
Caffe Reggio on MacDougal Street in Manhattan, founded in 1927

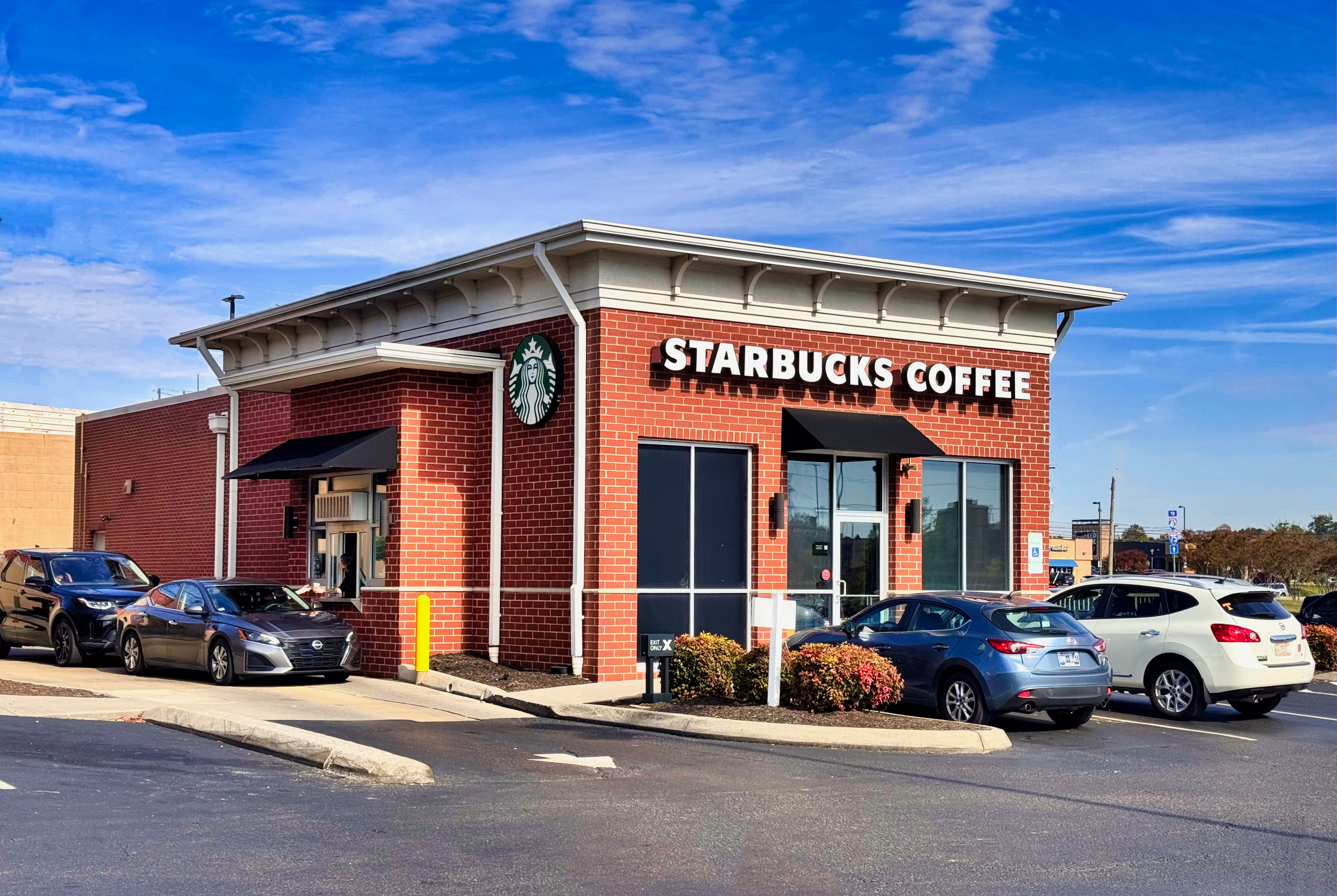
A Starbucks coffee shop in Knoxville, Tennessee with a drive-through

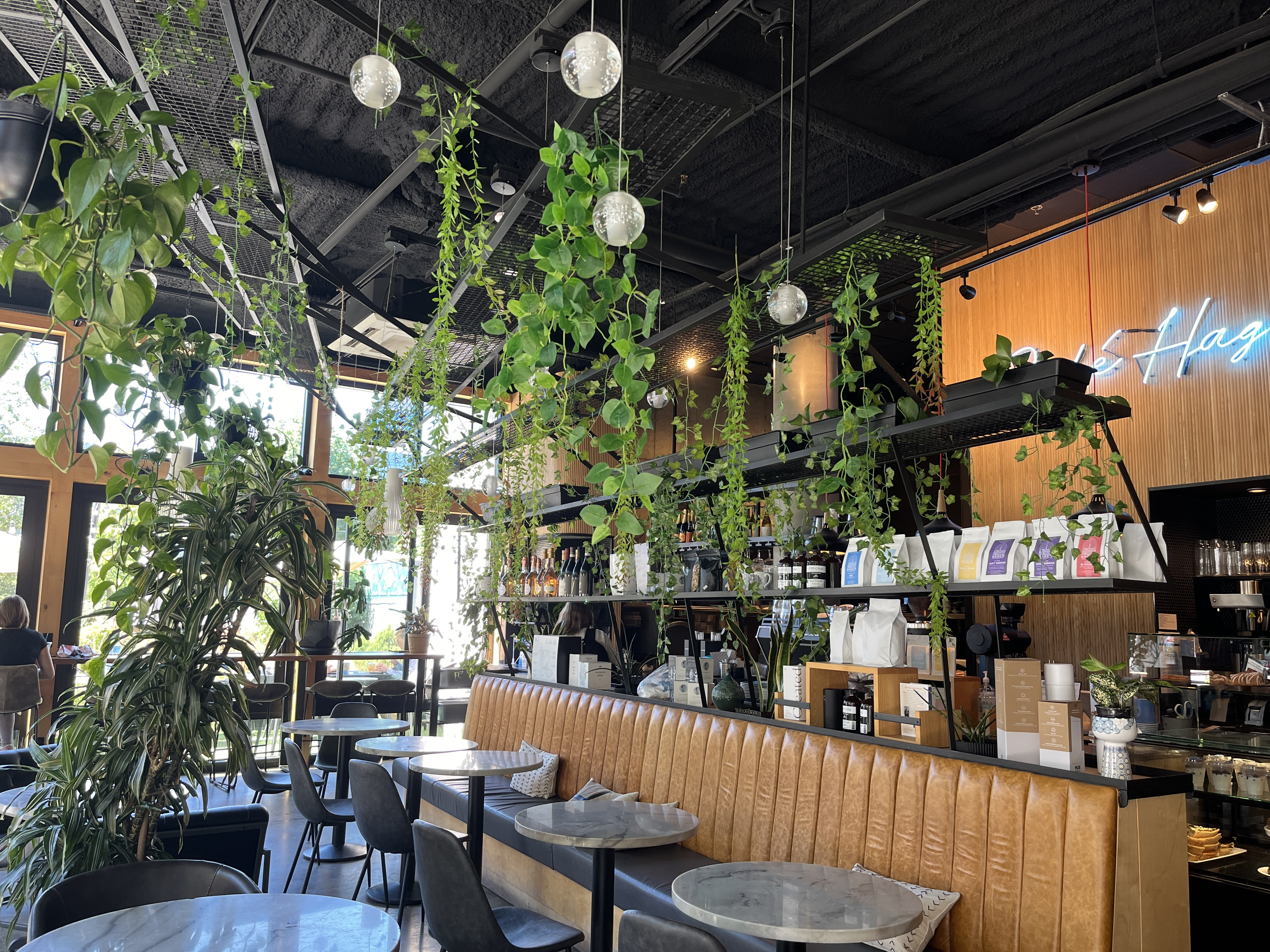
Café Hagen, Seattle, Washington (state)

== Contemporary history ==
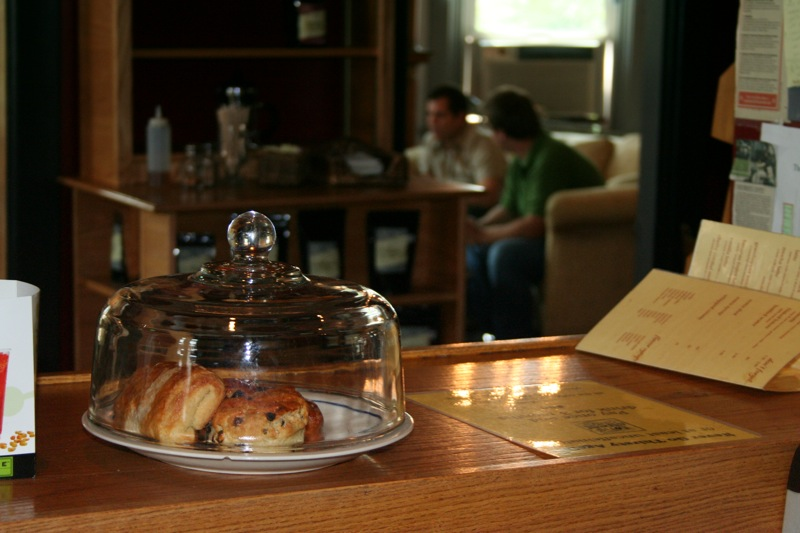
Coffeehouses often sell pastries or other food items.

A café may have an outdoor section (on a terrace, pavement, or sidewalk) with seats, tables, and parasols. This is especially common in Europe. Cafés offer a more open public space than many of the traditional pubs they have replaced, which were more male-dominated with a focus on alcohol.

One of the original uses of the café, as a place for information exchange and communication, was reintroduced in the 1990s with the Internet café or hotspot. The spread of modern-style cafés to urban and rural areas went hand-in-hand with the rising use of mobile computers. Computers and Internet access and contemporary decor help to create a youthful, modern place, compared to the traditional pubs or old-fashioned diners that they replaced.

=== Africa ===
==== Egypt ====
Coffeehouses in Egypt are colloquially called ʿahwah /ʔhwa/, the dialectal pronunciation of قَهْوة qahwah (literally "coffee") (Note: The [q] is debuccalized to [ʔ]. See also Arabic phonology#Local variations.) These were named after what was then the most popular drink that they served, though also commonly served in ʿahwah are tea (shāy) and herbal teas, especially the highly popular hibiscus blend (Egyptian Arabic: karkadeh or ennab).

The first ʿahwah opened around the 1850s but for a long time were patronized mostly by older people, with youths frequenting but not always ordering. However:

By the 1920s, there were many coffee shops throughout Egypt. They could be classified into three major kinds: the Alexandrian bursa, the Cairo club, and the rural gharza (inn). ... [All three] gradually became significant centres where Egyptians sipped the spirit of integration and unity.

==== Ethiopia ====
In Addis Ababa, the capital of Ethiopia, independent coffeehouses that struggled before 1991 have become popular with young professionals who do not have time for traditional coffee roasting at home. (Note: For a depiction of home preparation, see Nash, Carey (2014-09-28). "Ethiopian coffee ceremony". Carey Nash Photography. Archived from the original on 2014-10-08.) One that has become well known is Tomoca, which opened in 1953.

=== Asia ===
==== India ====
In India, coffee culture has expanded in the past twenty years. Chains like Indian Coffee House, Café Coffee Day, and Barista Lavazza have become very popular. Cafés are considered good places to conduct office meetings and for friends to meet.

==== China ====
In China, a growing number of domestic coffeehouse chains have emerged since the 1990s. Among them, Luckin Coffee, founded in Beijing in 2017, has become a notable homegrown challenger to Western brands that have dominated China's market such as Starbucks. By leveraging a digital-first, app-based model and aggressive pricing, Luckin rapidly expanded to over 20,000 stores in China by 2024, overtaking Starbucks as the country's largest coffee chain by revenue and store count. Starbucks' market share in China fell from a peak of 42% in 2017 to 14% in 2024, while Luckin posted strong revenue and profit growth. In 2025, Luckin took its rivalry global by opening its first U.S. stores in New York City, signaling the rise of a domestic Chinese coffee brand on the world stage. Coffee culture continues to expand in major cities, though tea remains the dominant and historical daily beverage for most of the population.

==== Malaysia and Singapore ====
In Malaysia and Singapore, traditional breakfast and coffee shops are called kopi tiam. The word is a compound of the Malay word for coffee (as borrowed and altered from English) and the Hokkien dialect word for shop (店; POJ: tiàm). Menus typically offer a variety of simple dishes based on egg, toast, and coconut jam, plus coffee, tea, and Milo, a popular malted chocolate drink.

==== Indonesia ====
In Indonesia, traditional coffeehouses are called kedai kopi, rumah kopi, or warung kopi which is often abbreviated as warkop. Kopi tubruk (resembling Turkish coffee) is a common drink in small warkop. To accompany this, traditional kue is also served. The first coffeehouse in Indonesia was founded in 1878 in Jakarta and named Warung Tinggi Tek Sun Ho.

==== Philippines ====
A coffeehouse stand in Angeles City, Philippines

In the Philippines, coffee shop chains like Starbucks have become the prevalent hangouts for upper- and middle-class professionals in such districts as the Makati CBD. However, carinderias (small eateries) continue to serve coffee alongside breakfast and snack dishes. Events called kapihan (fora) are often held inside bakeshops or restaurants that also serve coffee for breakfast or merienda. A number of places often called "cafés" serve not just coffee and pastries but full meals, often international cuisine adapted to Filipino tastes.

==== Thailand ====
In Thailand, the term "café" not only is a coffeehouse as understood elsewhere, but in the past was considered a bar serving alcoholic drinks during a comedy show on stage. This type of business flourished in the 1990s, before the 1997 financial crisis.

The first real coffeehouse in Thailand opened in 1917 at the Si Kak Phraya Si in the area of Rattanakosin Island, by Madam Cole, an American woman then living in Thailand. Later, Chao Phraya Ram Rakop (เจ้าพระยารามราฆพ), a Thai aristocrat, opened a coffeehouse named "Café de Norasingha" (คาเฟ่นรสิงห์) at Sanam Suea Pa (สนามเสือป่า), next to the Royal Plaza. Café de Norasingha has been renovated and moved within Phayathai Palace. In the southern region, a traditional coffeehouse or kopi tiam is popular with locals, like many countries in the Malay Peninsula.

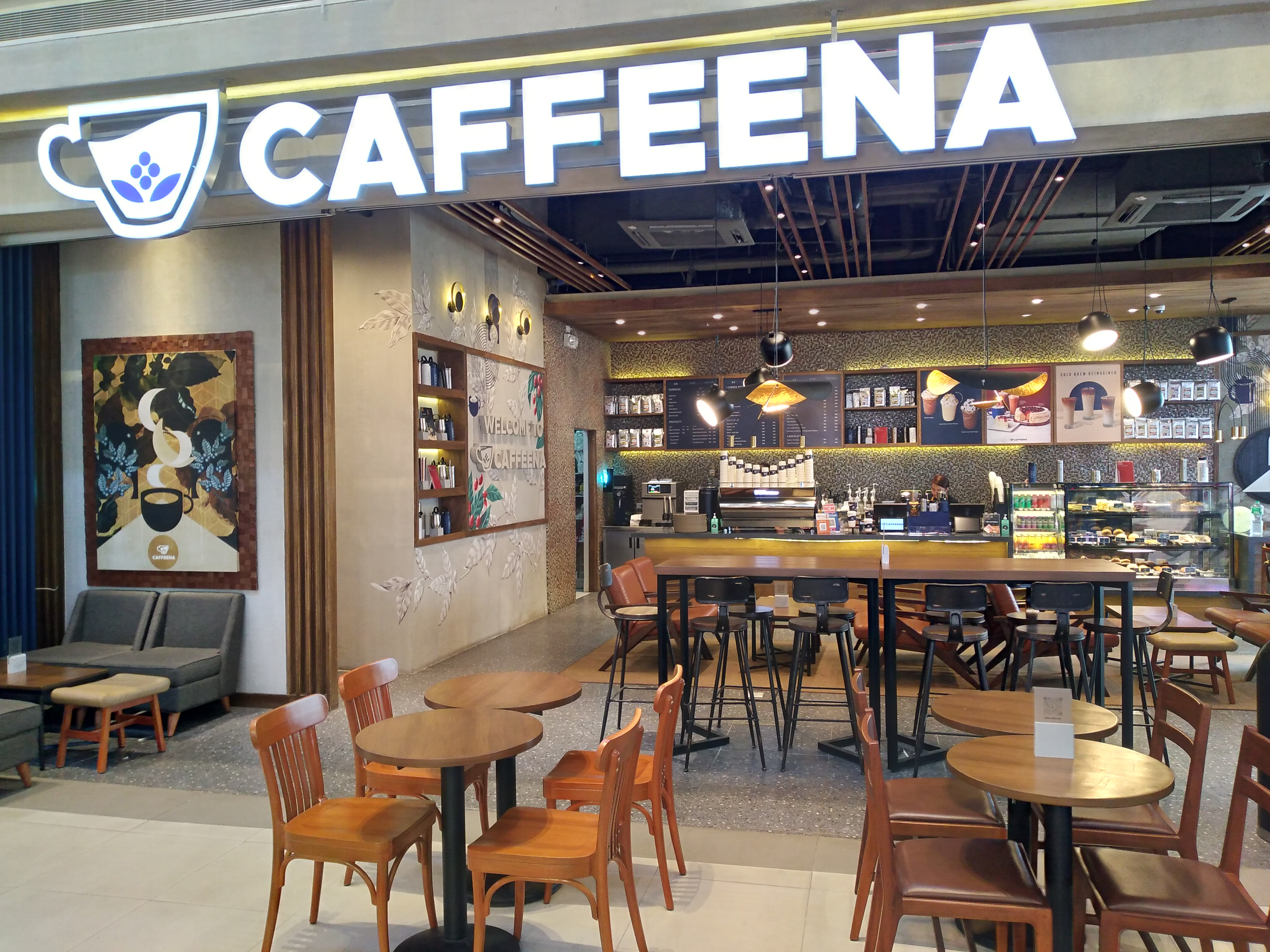
A coffee shop in Bacoor, Philippines

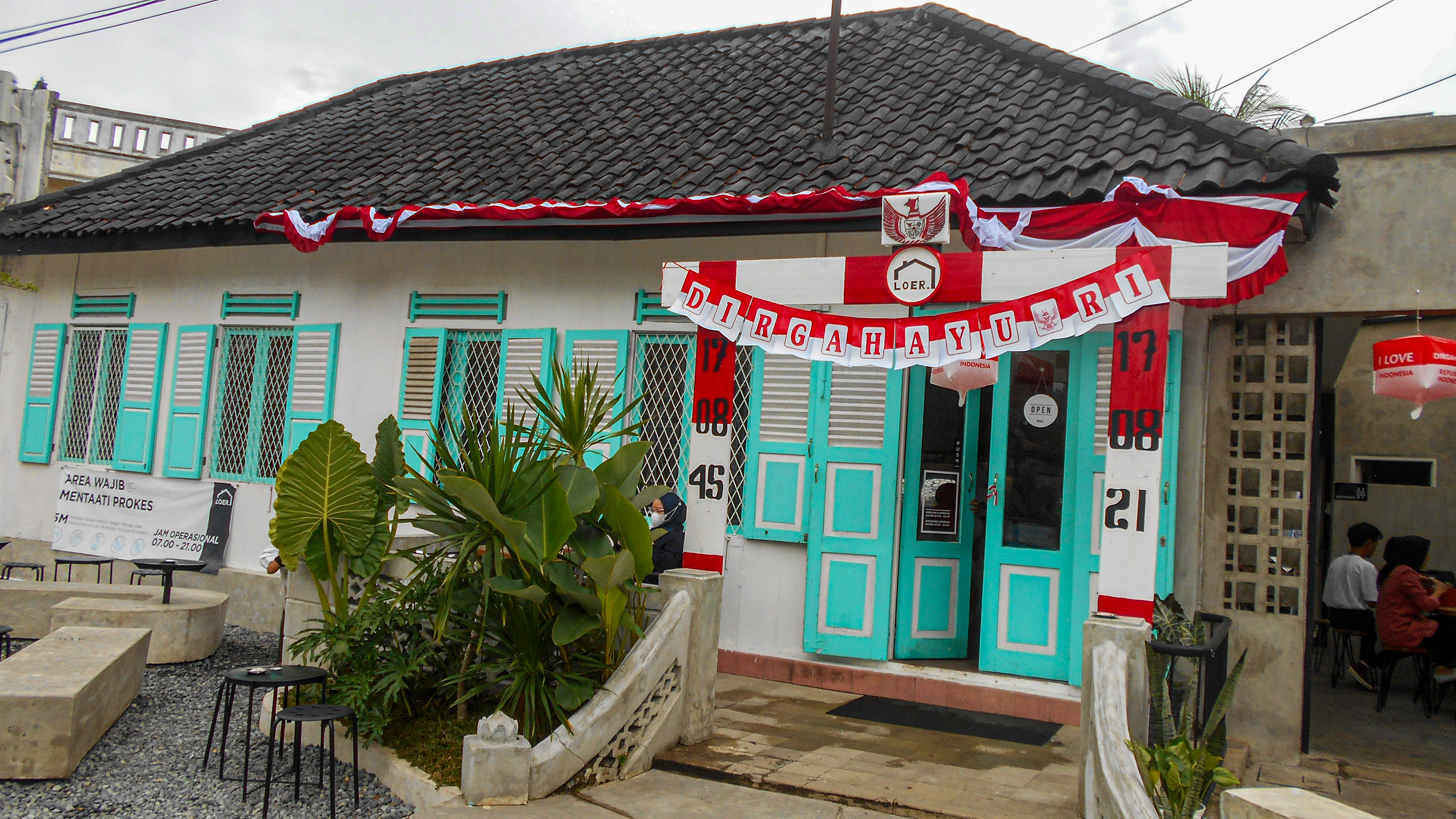
Rumah Loer, a contemporary-style coffee shop (Indonesian: rumah kopi kekinian) in Palembang, Indonesia

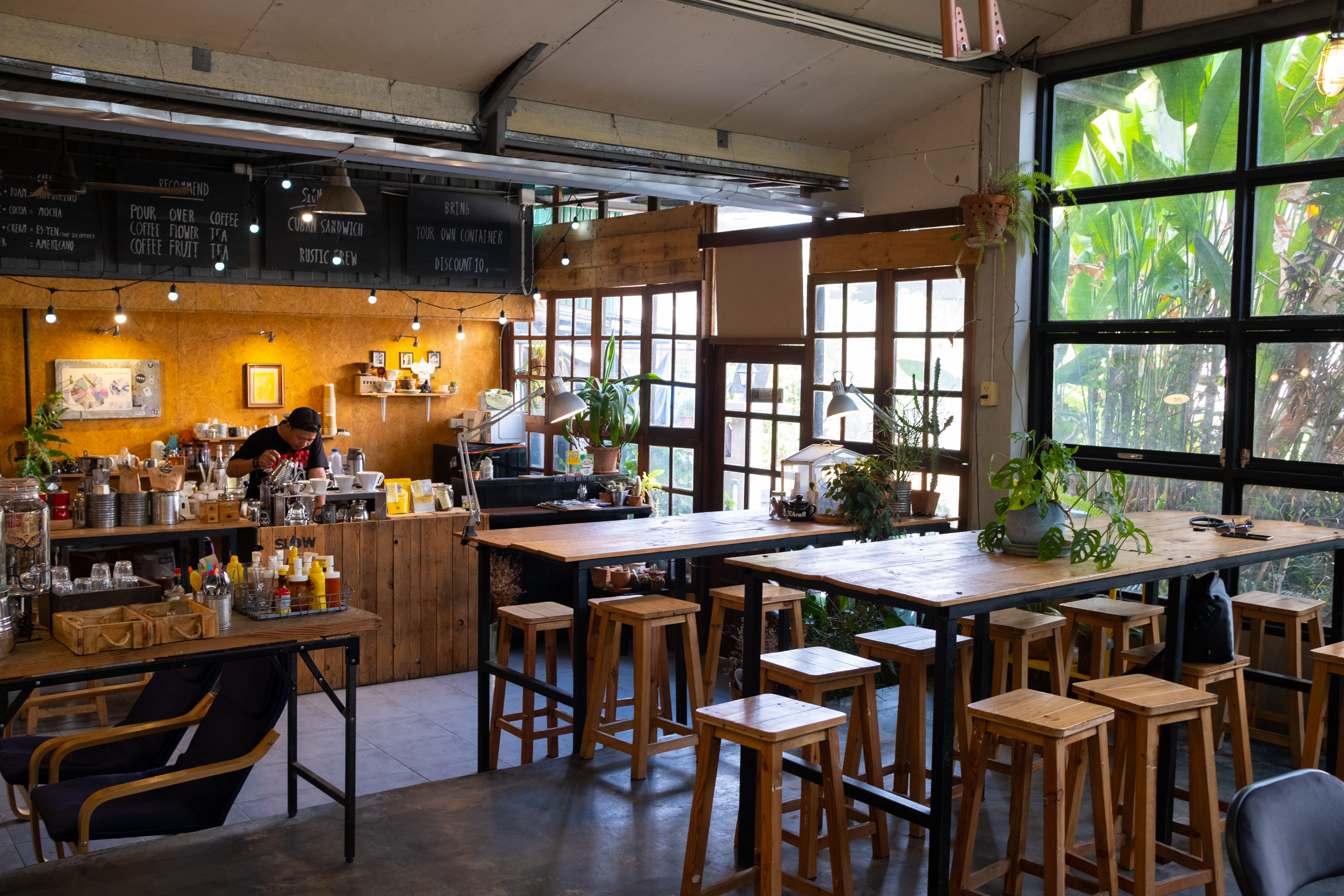
A shop specializing in drip coffee in Nakhon Ratchasima, Thailand

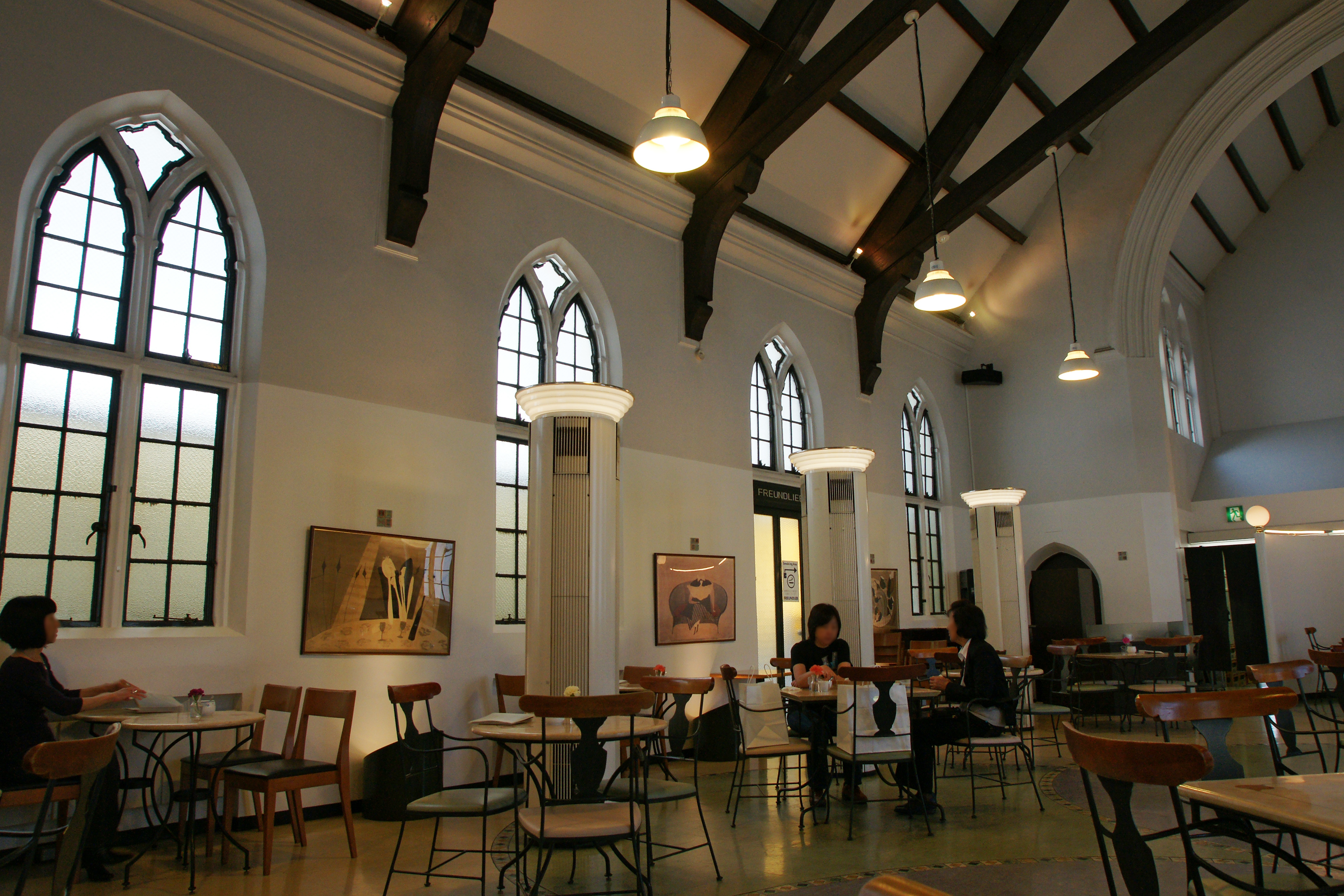
A café in a former church, Kobe, Japan

=== Australia ===
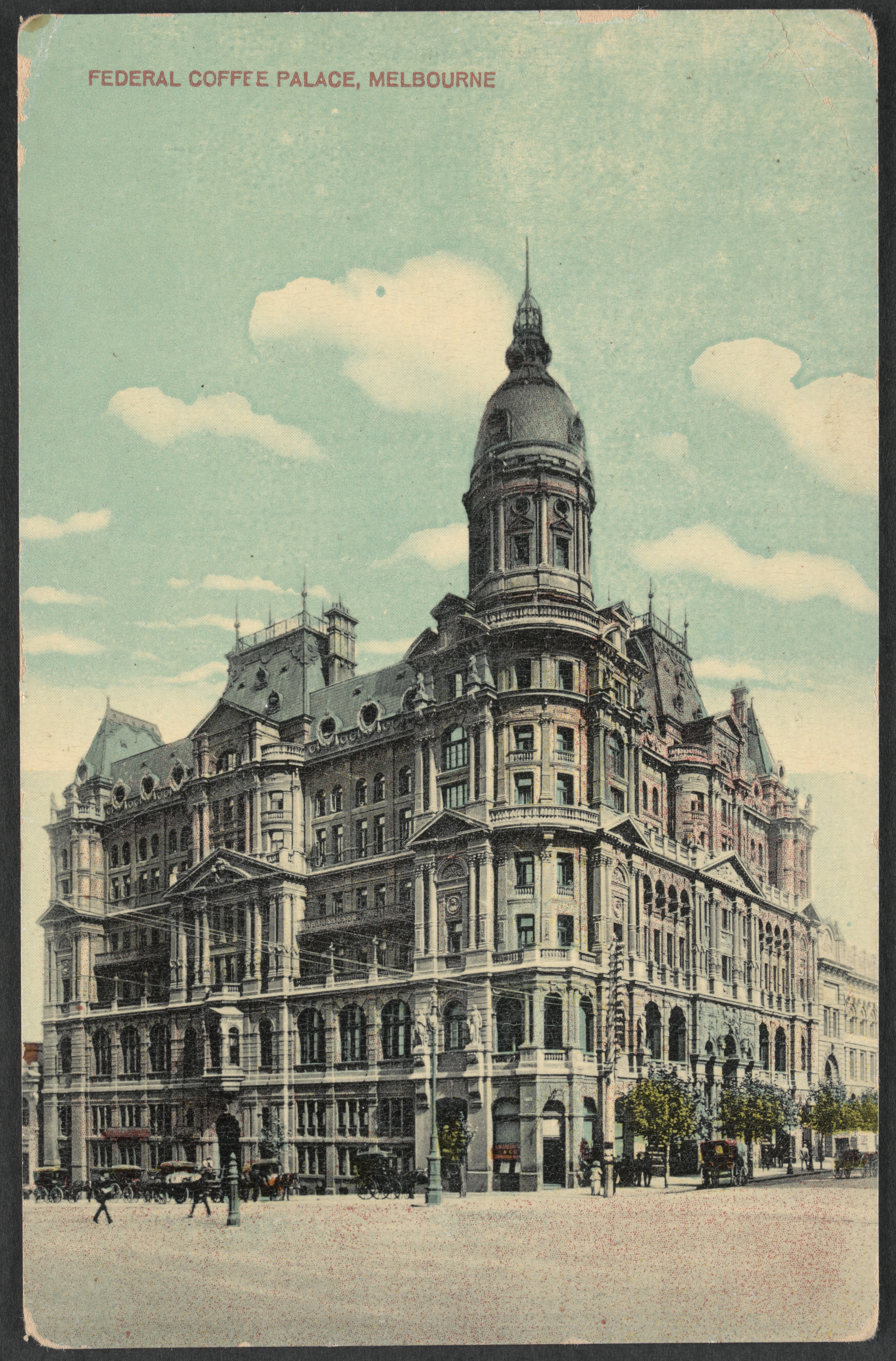
The Federal Coffee Palace, built on Collins Street, Melbourne, in 1888, was the largest and grandest "coffee palace" ever built. It was demolished in 1973.

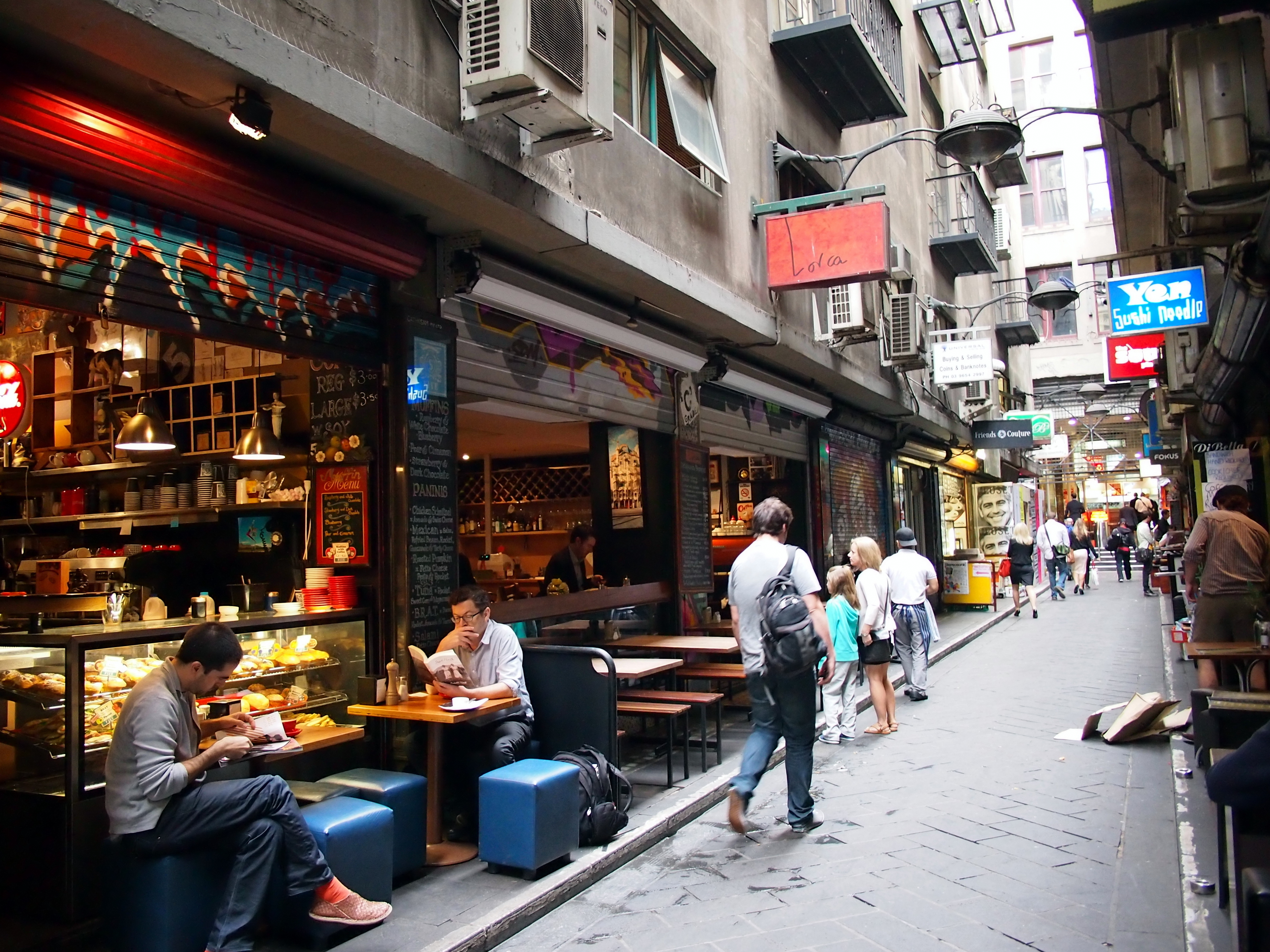
Centre Place, Melbourne. Australia and New Zealand have competing claims to being the birthplace of the "flat white".

In the 19th century, coffeehouses such as the Federal Coffee Palace in the center of Melbourne were part of the temperance movement.

In modern Australia, coffee shops are commonly called cafés. Since the post-World War II influx of Italian and Greek immigrants introduced the first espresso machines to Australia in the 1950s, there was initially a slow rise in café culture, particularly in Melbourne, until a nationwide boom in locally-owned cafés began in the 1990s. Alongside the rise in the number of cafés has been a rise in demand for locally (or on-site) roasted specialty coffee, particularly in Sydney and Melbourne. A local favorite is the "flat white".

=== Europe ===
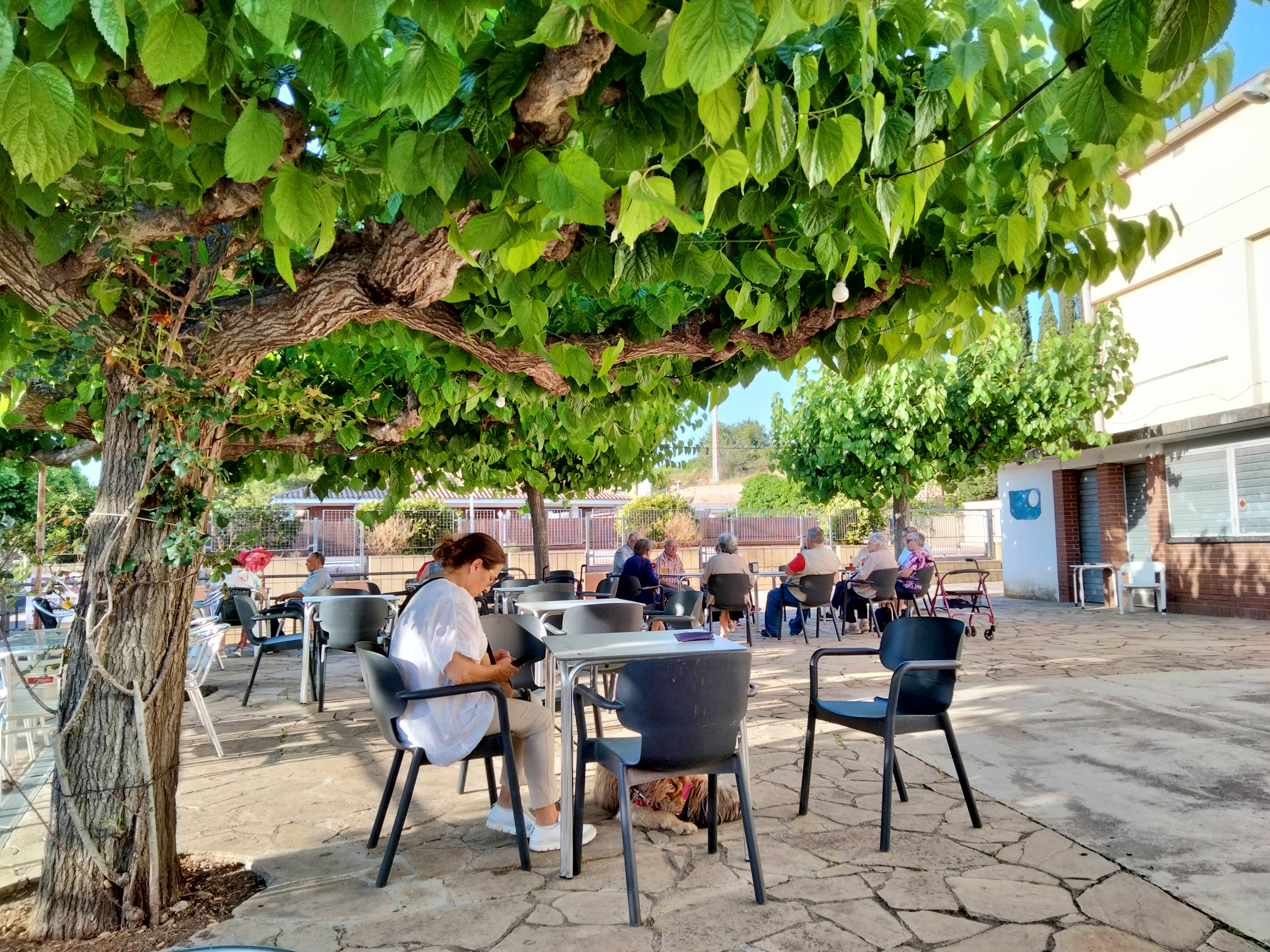
A sidewalk cafe in Spain

In most European countries, such as Spain, Austria, Denmark, Germany, Norway, Sweden, Portugal, and others, the term café means a restaurant primarily serving coffee, as well as pastries such as cakes, tarts, pies, and buns. Many cafés also serve light meals such as sandwiches. European cafés often have tables on the pavement (sidewalk) as well as indoors. Some, particularly in Southern Europe, also serve alcoholic drinks (e.g., wine). In the Netherlands and Belgium, a café is the equivalent of a bar, and also sells alcoholic drinks. In the Netherlands a koffiehuis serves coffee, while a "coffee shop" (the English term) sells "soft" drugs (cannabis and hashish) and is generally not allowed to sell alcoholic drinks. In France, most cafés serve as lunch restaurants in the day, and bars in the evening. They generally do not have pastries except in the mornings, when a croissant or pain au chocolat can be bought with breakfast coffee.

In Italy, cafés are similar to those found in France and known as bar. They typically serve a variety of espresso coffee, cakes and alcoholic drinks. Bars in city centers usually have different prices for consumption at the bar and consumption at a table.

==== Ireland ====
Today, the word café – also spelled cafe, (Note: In Irish usage, the spelling difference does not distinguish between coffeehouse and diner, and is merely a decision by the owner: thus the two largest diner-style café chains in Ireland in the 1990s were named "Kylemore Cafe" and "Bewley's Café": one written without the acute accent and the other with.) but always pronounced as two syllables – is used for most coffeehouses. It has also come to be used for a type of diner that offers cooked meals (again, without alcoholic beverages) which can be standalone or operating within shopping centres or department stores.

==== United Kingdom ====
The patrons of the early English coffeehouses were far removed from those of modern Britain. Haunts for teenagers in particular, Italian-run espresso bars and their formica-topped tables were a feature of 1950s Soho that provided a backdrop as well as a title for Cliff Richard's 1960 film Expresso Bongo. The first of these was the Moka in Frith Street, opened by Gina Lollobrigida in 1953. The late 1950s Soho cafes in the film have "[an] exotic Gaggia coffee machine ... [and] Coke, Pepsi, weak frothy coffee and a Suncrush orange fountain"; they spread to other urban centers during the 1960s, providing affordable, warm places for young people to congregate and an ambience far removed from the global coffee bar standard set in the final decades of the century by chains such as Starbucks and Pret a Manger.

=== Espresso bar ===
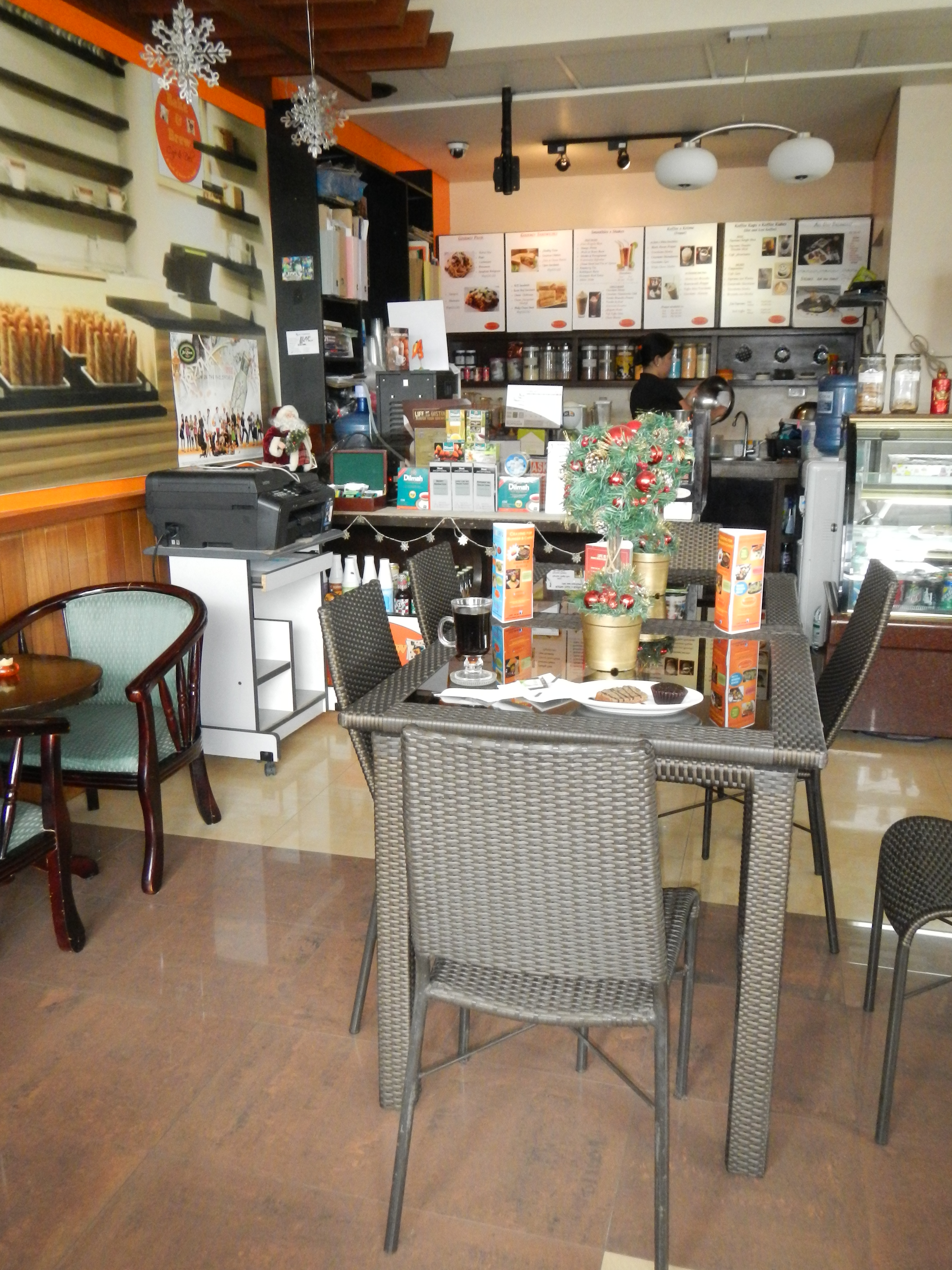
Interior of an espresso bar in Baliwag, Philippines

The espresso bar is a type of coffeehouse that specializes in coffee drinks made from espresso. Originating in Italy, it has spread throughout the world in various forms. International chains include Starbucks Coffee, based in Seattle, U.S., and Costa Coffee, based in Loudwater, U.K. (the first and second largest coffeehouse chains respectively), although the espresso bar exists in some form throughout much of the world.

The espresso bar typically has a long counter with a high-yield espresso machine (usually bean to cup machines, automatic or semiautomatic pump-type machine, although occasionally a manually operated lever-and-piston system) and a display case containing pastries and occasionally savory items such as sandwiches. In the traditional Italian bar, customers either order at the bar and consume their drinks standing or, if they wish to sit down and be served, are usually charged a higher price. In some bars there is an additional charge for drinks served at an outside table. In other countries, especially the United States, seating areas for customers to relax and work are provided free of charge. Some espresso bars also sell coffee paraphernalia, candy, and even music. North American espresso bars were also at the forefront of the proliferation of public Wi-Fi access points to provide Internet services to people working on laptop computers.

The offerings at the typical espresso bar are generally quite Italianate in inspiration; biscotti, cannoli and pizzelle are common traditional accompaniments to a caffè latte or cappuccino. Some espresso bars even offer alcoholic drinks such as grappa and sambuca. Nevertheless, typical pastries are not always strictly Italianate and common additions include scones, muffins, croissants, and even doughnuts. There is usually a large selection of teas as well, and the North American espresso bar culture is responsible for the popularization of the Indian spiced tea drink masala chai. Iced drinks are also popular in some countries, including both iced tea and iced coffee as well as blended drinks such as Starbucks' Frappucino.

A worker in an espresso bar is called a barista. This is a skilled position that requires familiarity with the drinks being made (often very elaborate, especially in North American-style espresso bars) and a reasonable facility with some equipment, as well as the usual customer service skills.

== Gallery ==
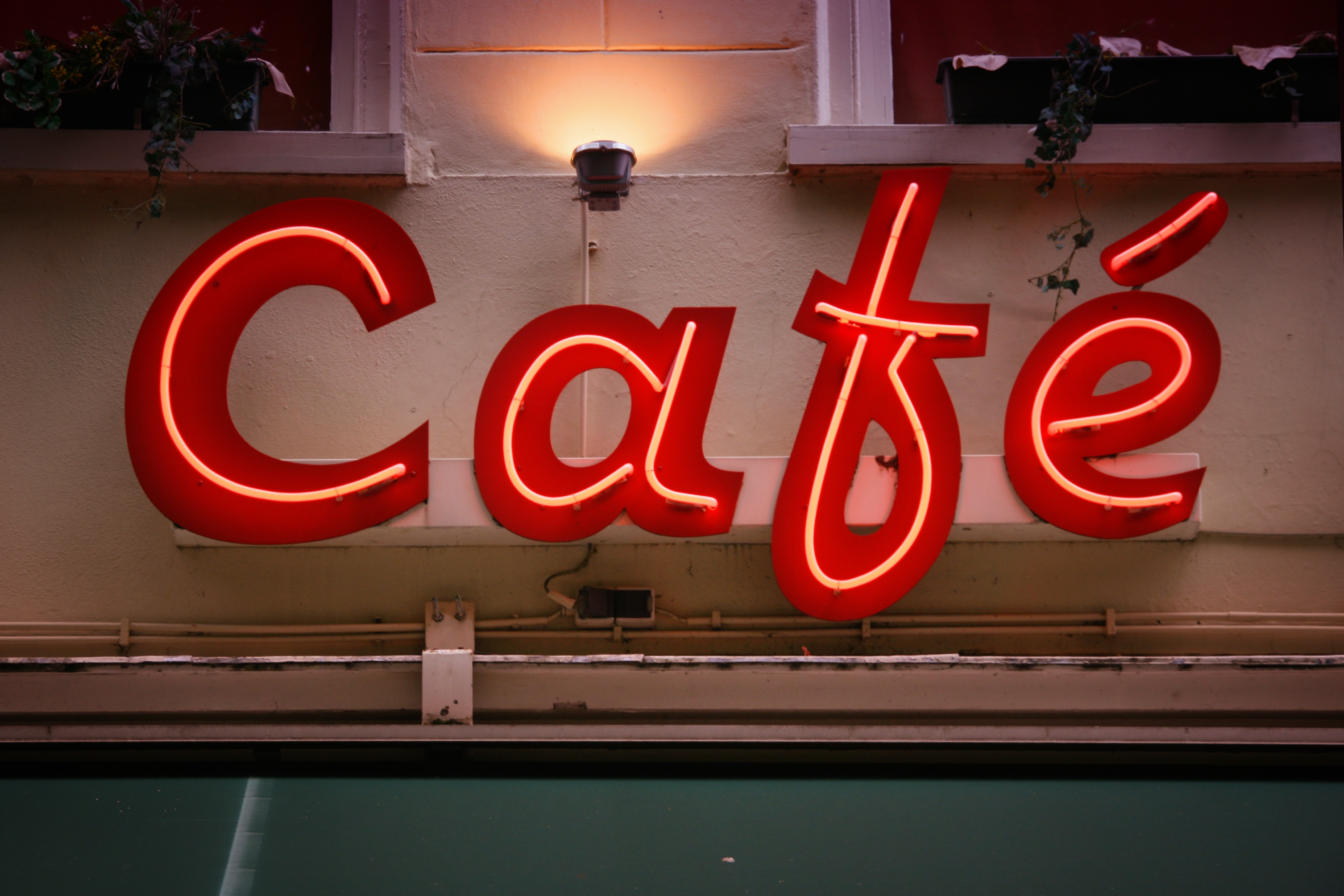
"Café" neon sign in Breda, Netherlands

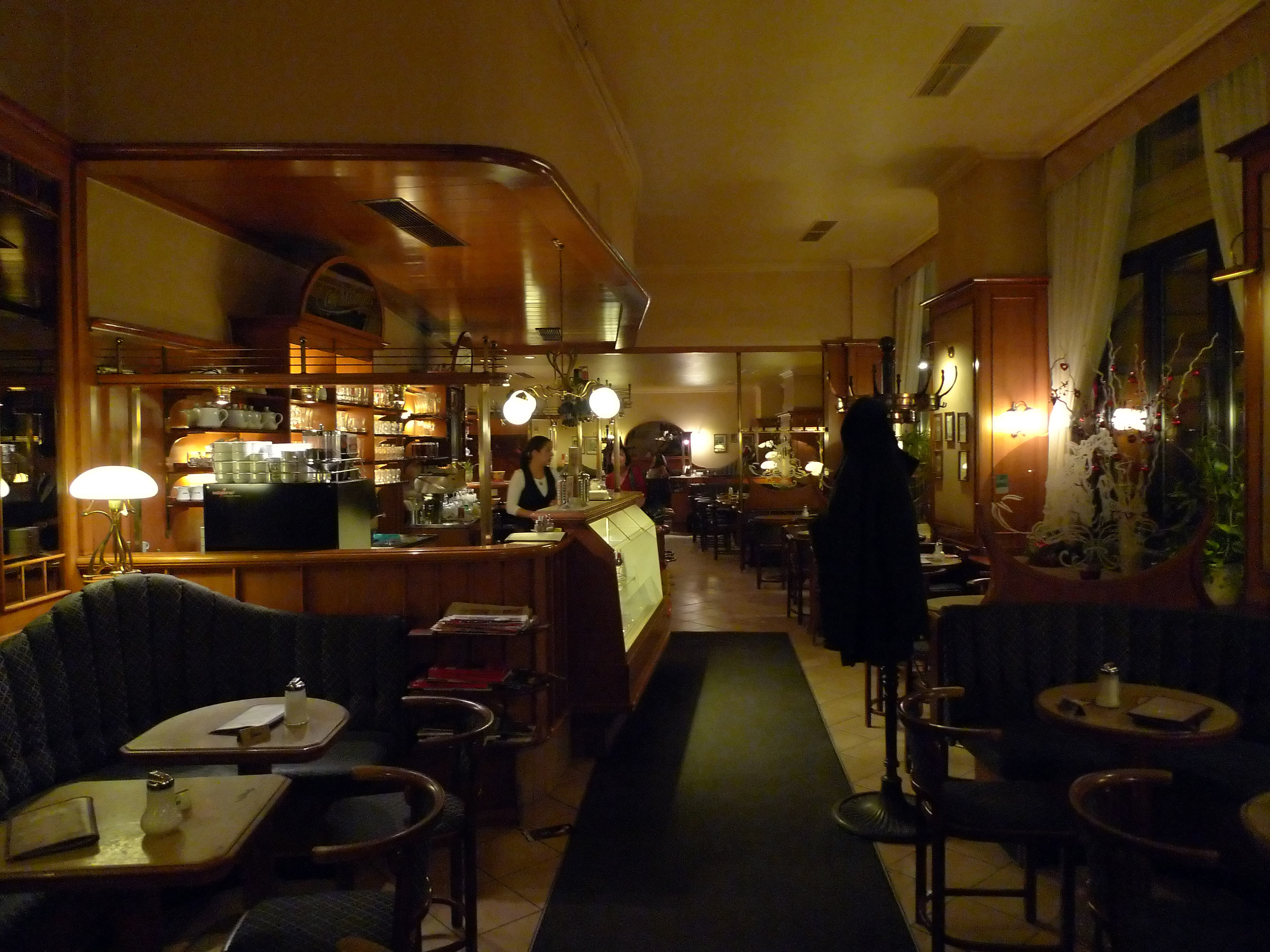
Café Mélange, Vienna

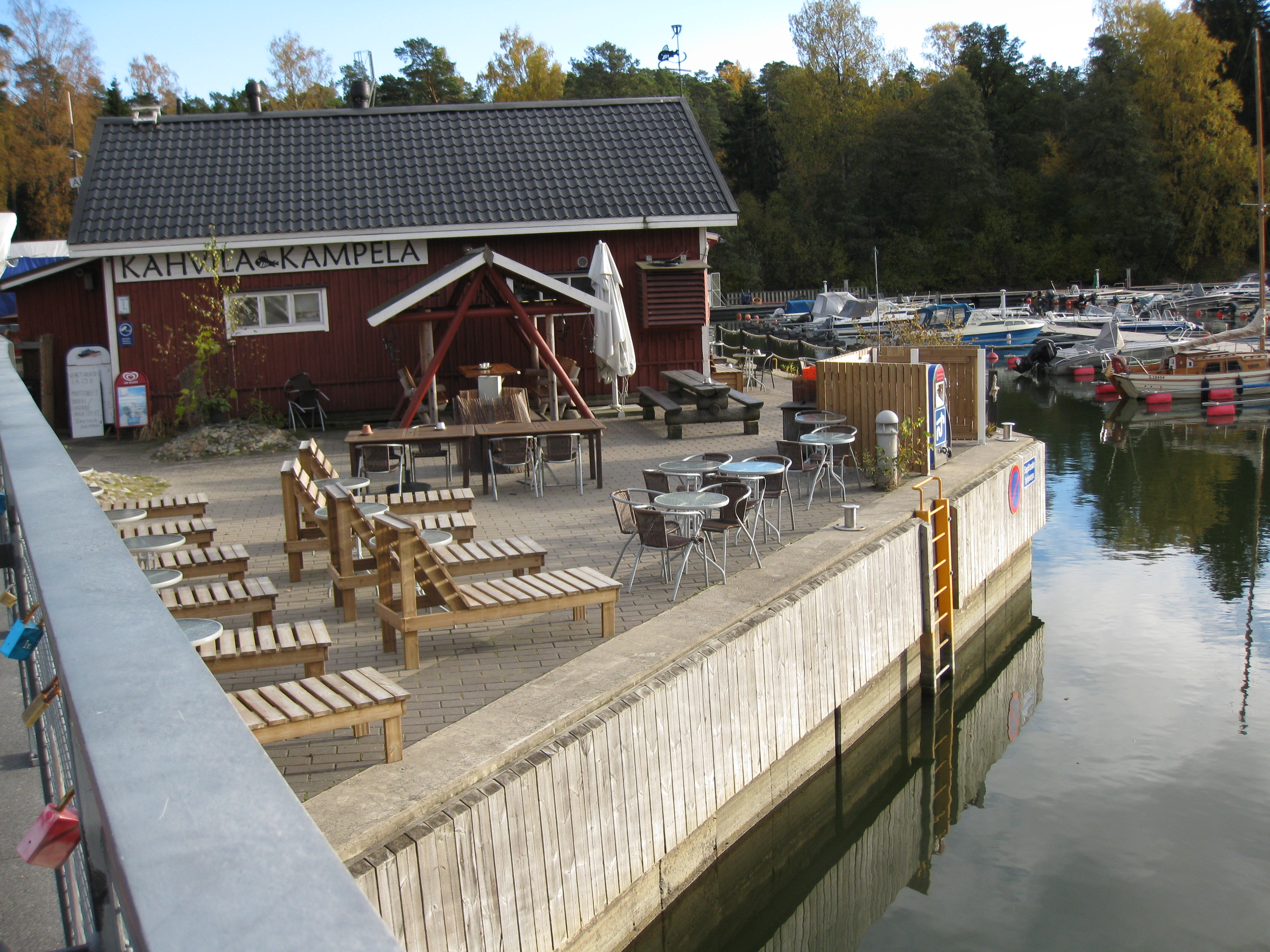
Café Kampela, Helsinki

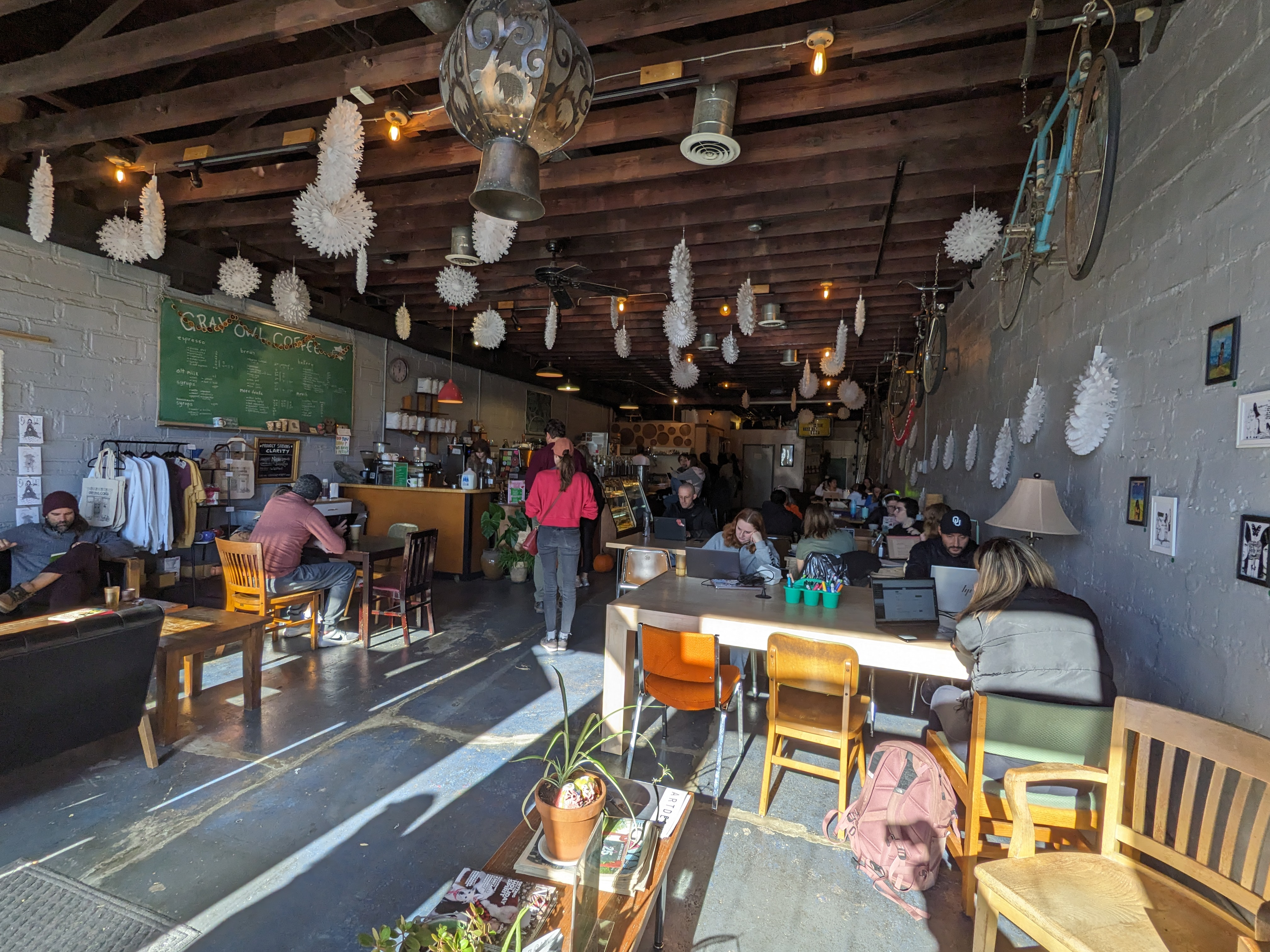
The Grey Owl Coffee shop in Norman, Oklahoma

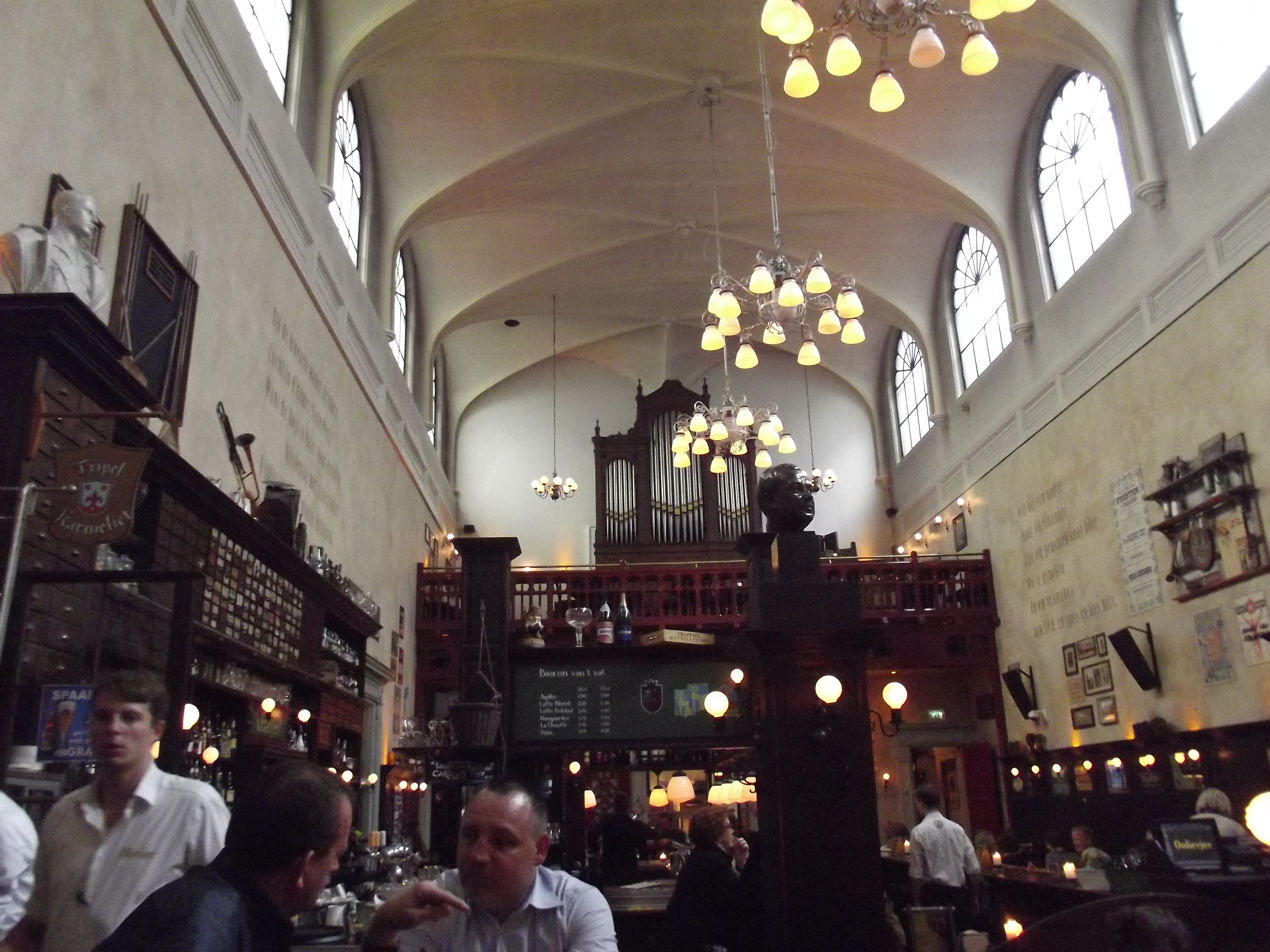
A café in a former church, Utrecht

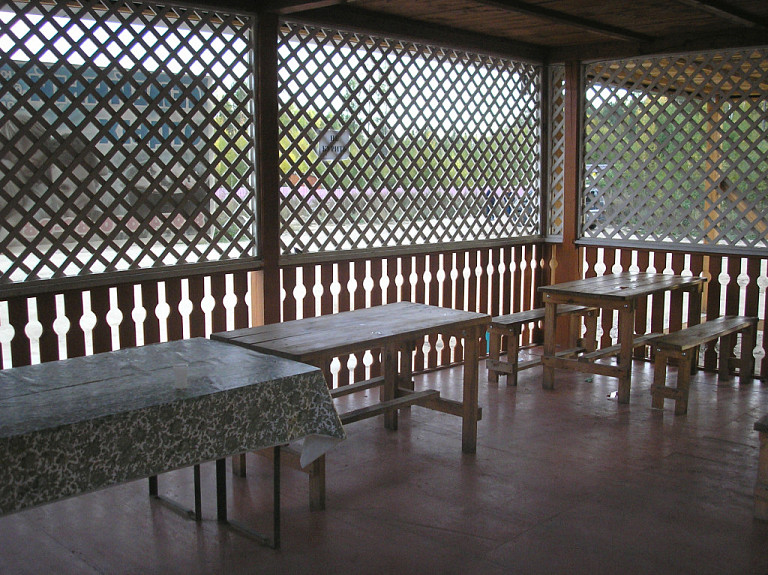
Roadside café with a summer terrace, Buryatia, Russia

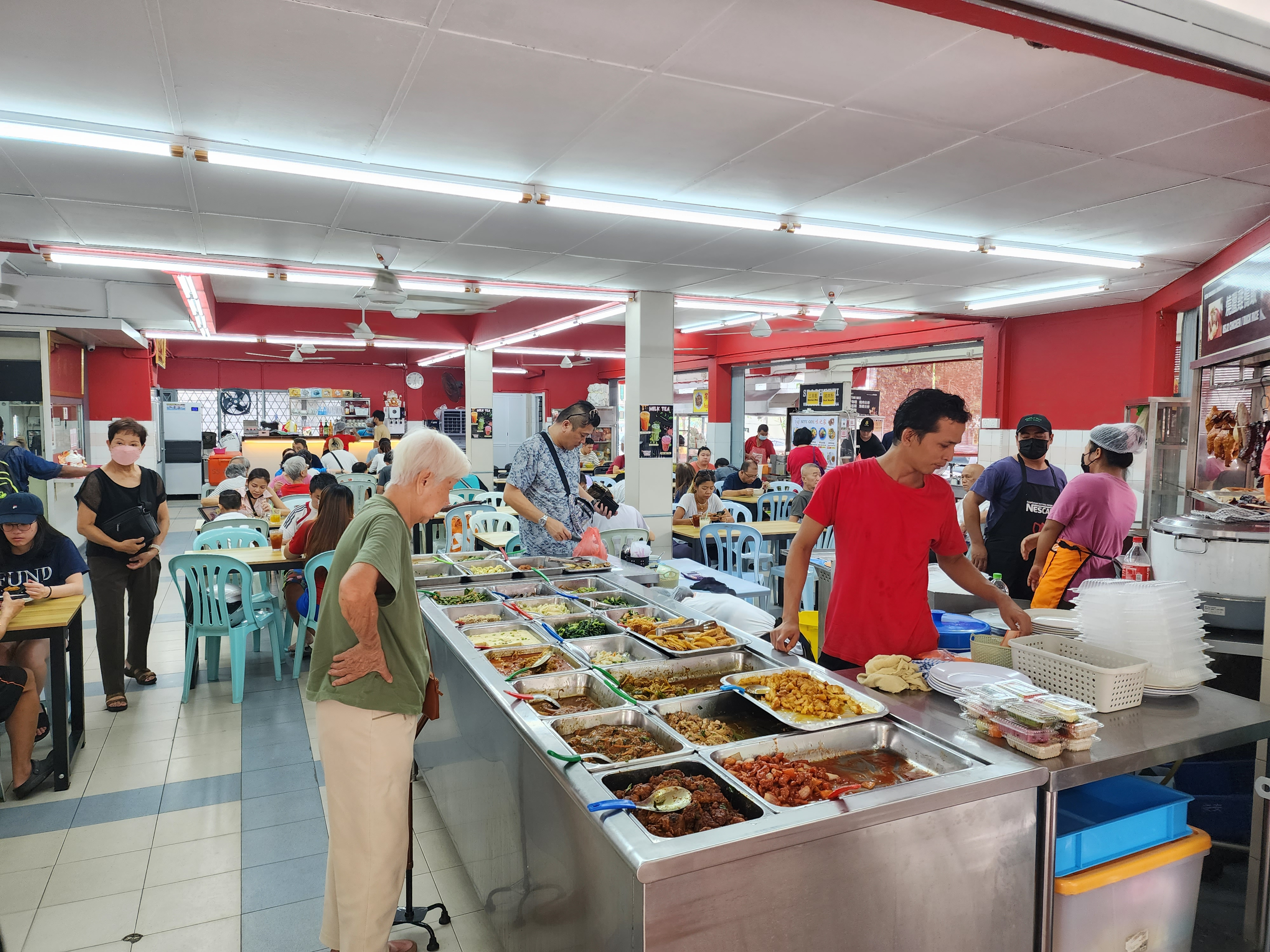
Interior of a kopitiam, Malaysia

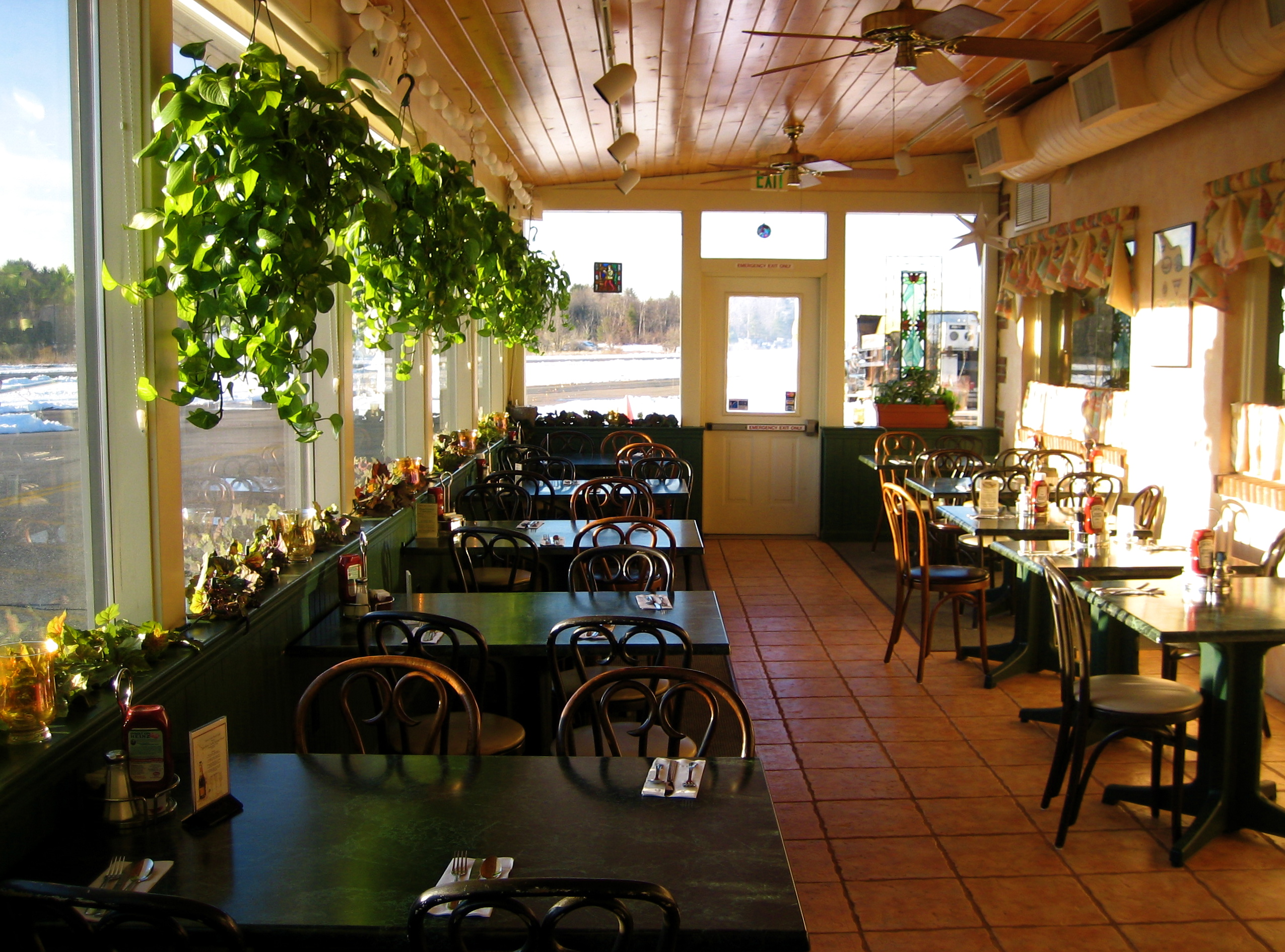
A café in Massachusetts, U.S.

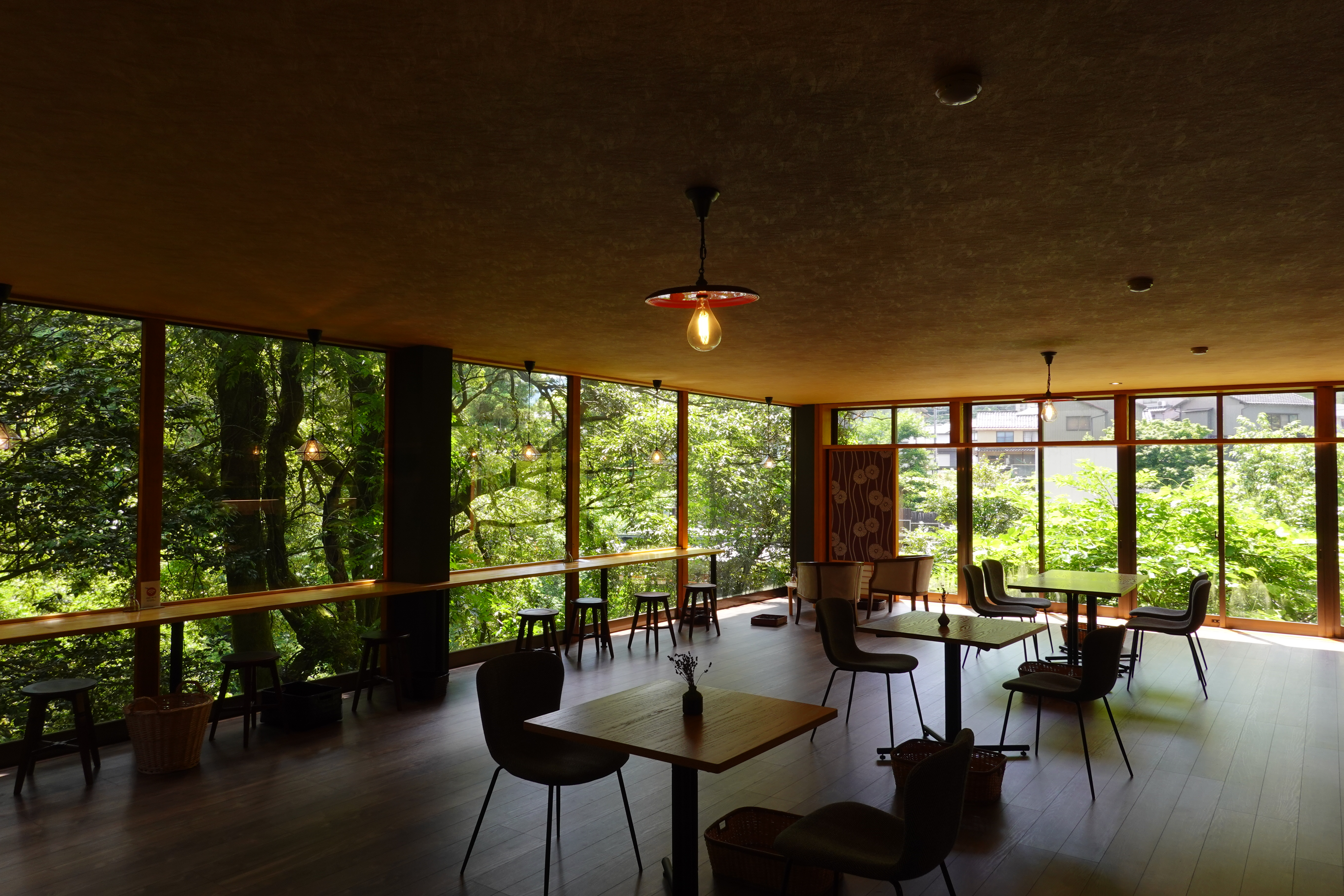
Interior of Mugenan, Yamanaka Onsen, Japan

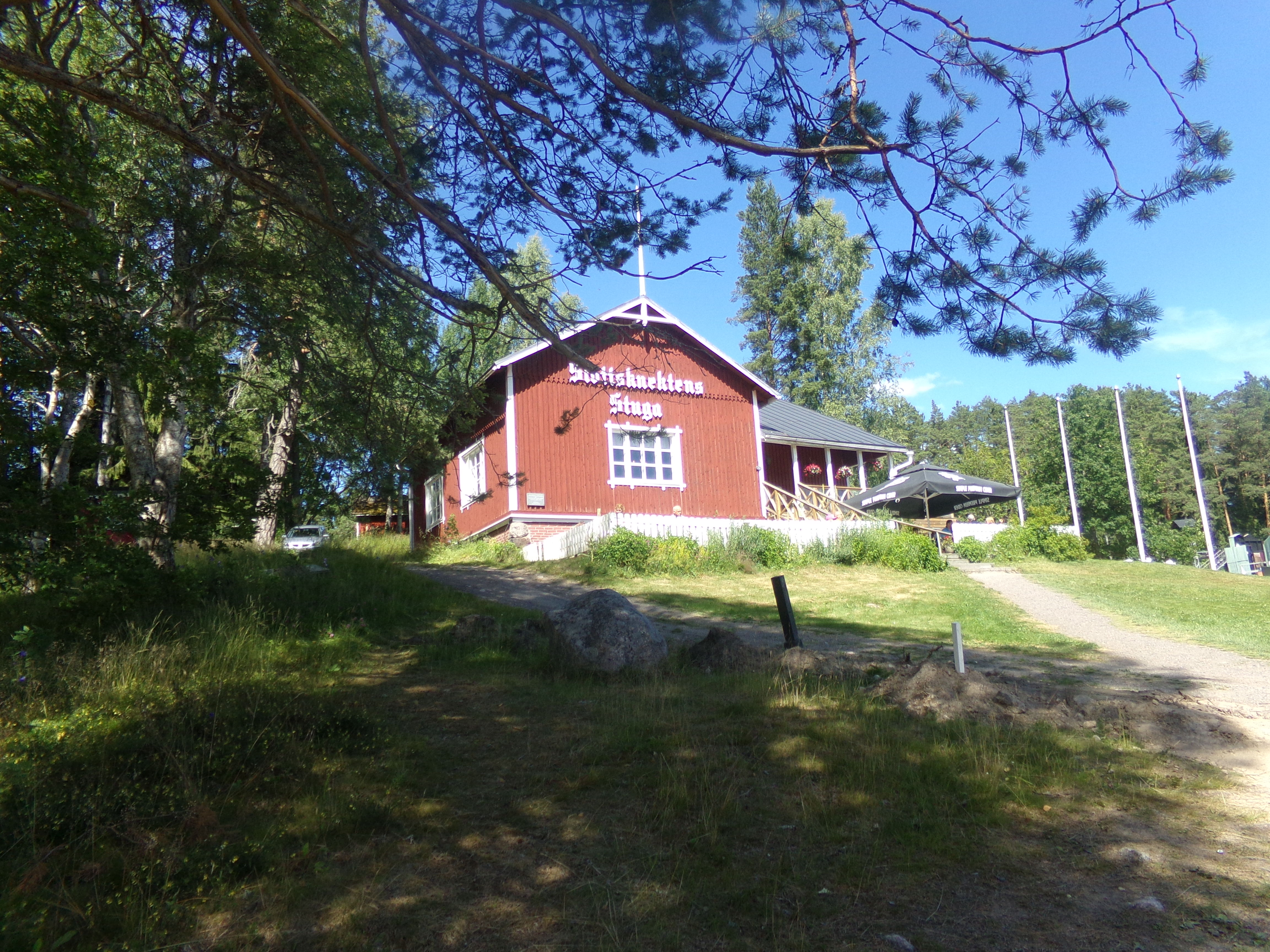
A cafe near Raseborg Castle, Finland

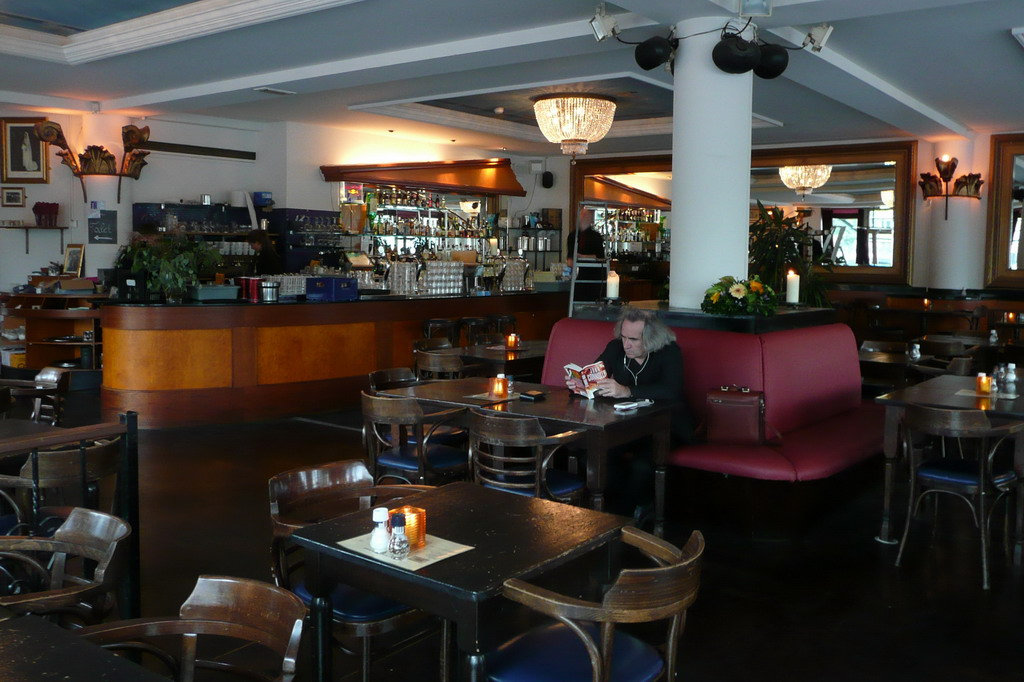
'Dantzig aan de Amstel' café Amsterdam, Netherlands

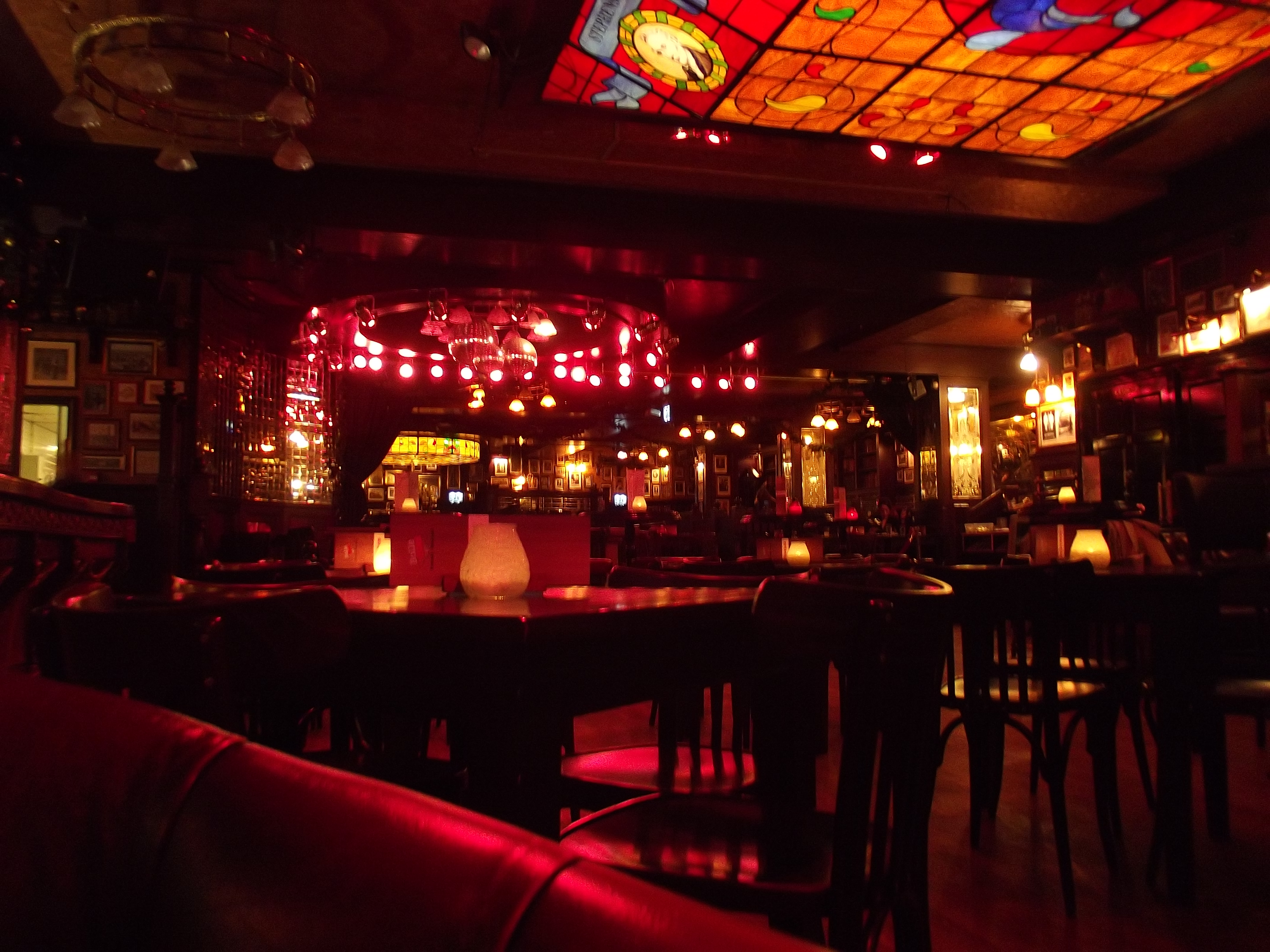
Kroeg, Eindhoven, Netherlands

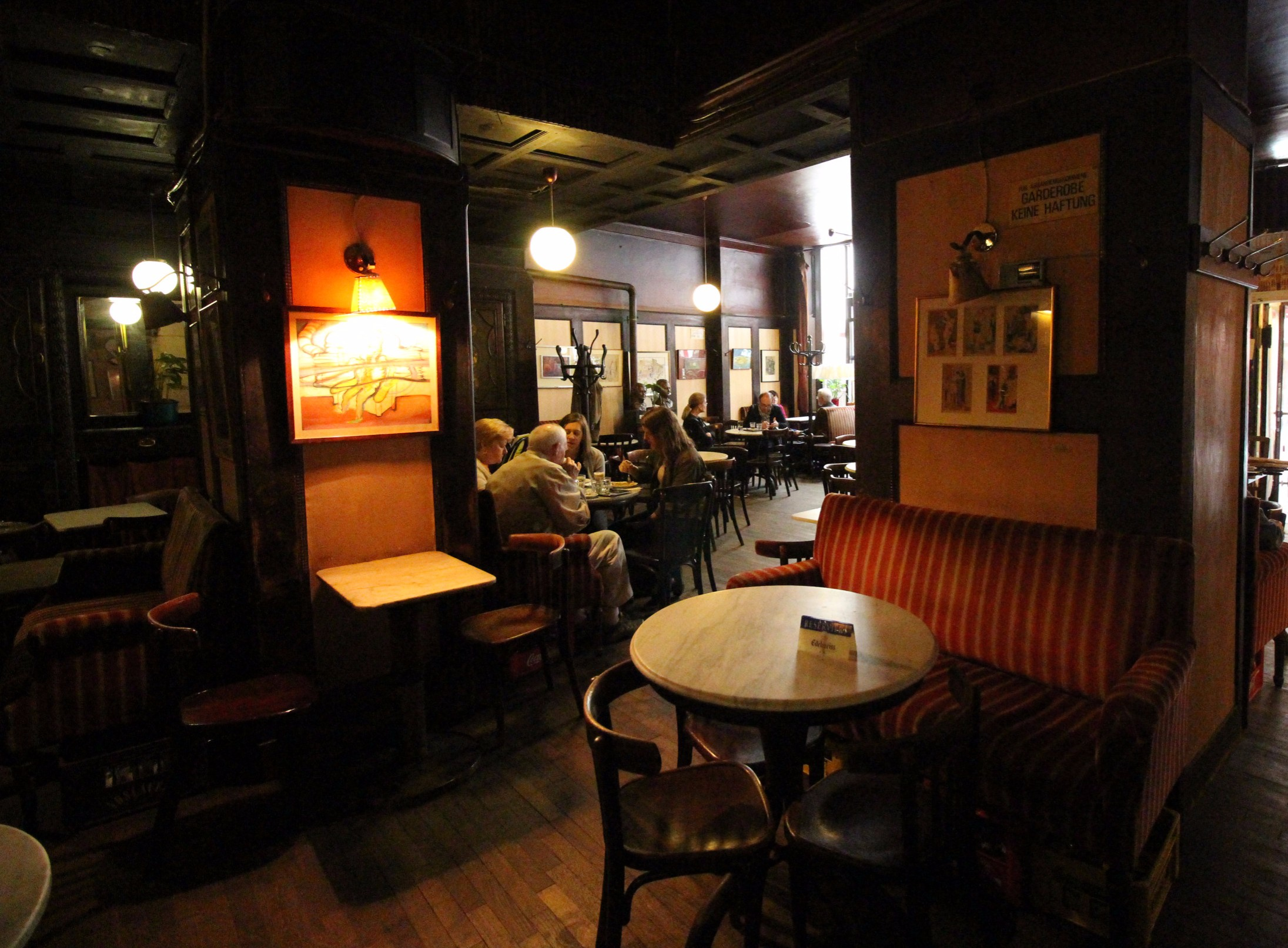
Café Hawelka, Vienna, Austria

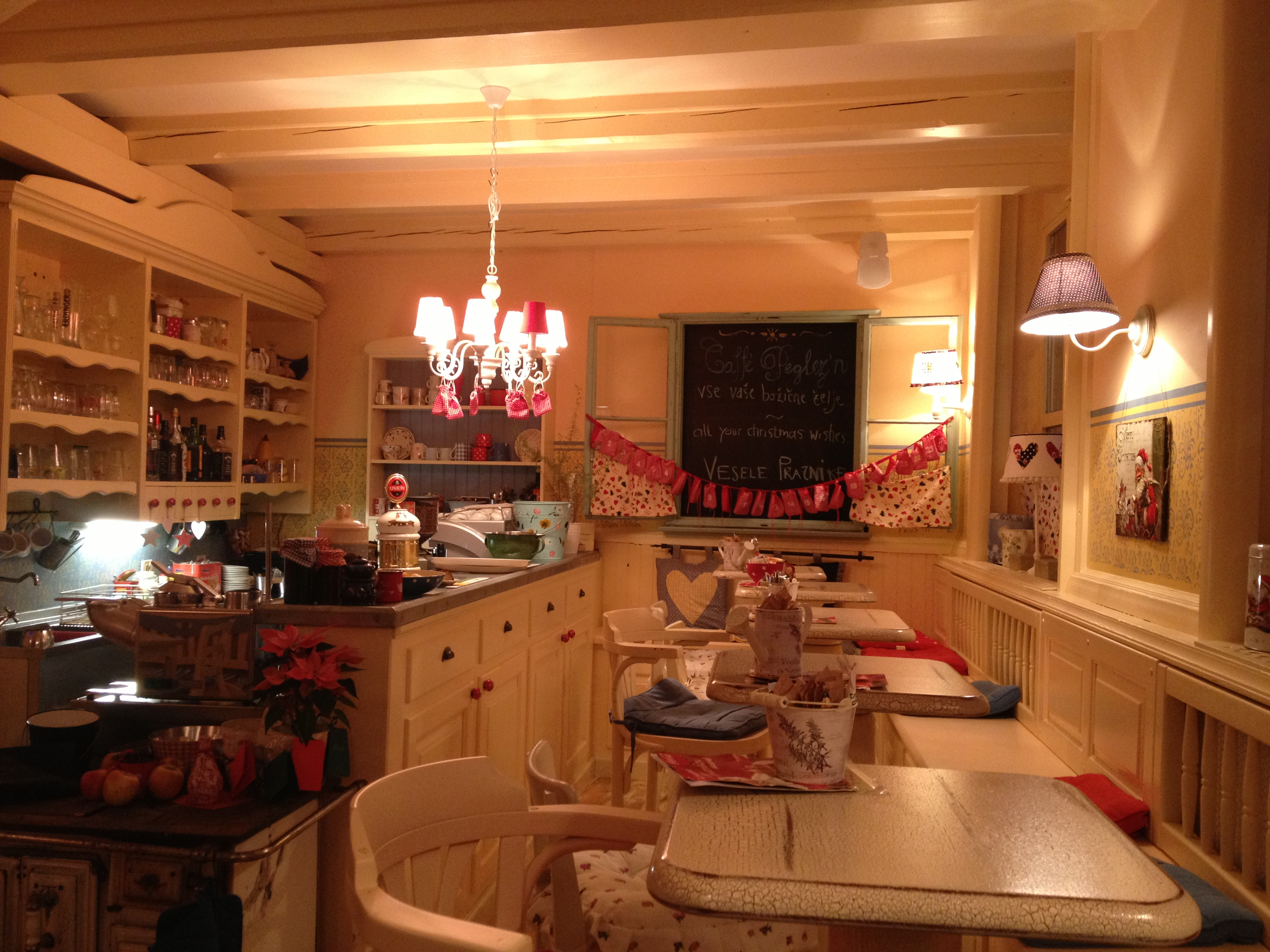
A café in Bled, Slovenia

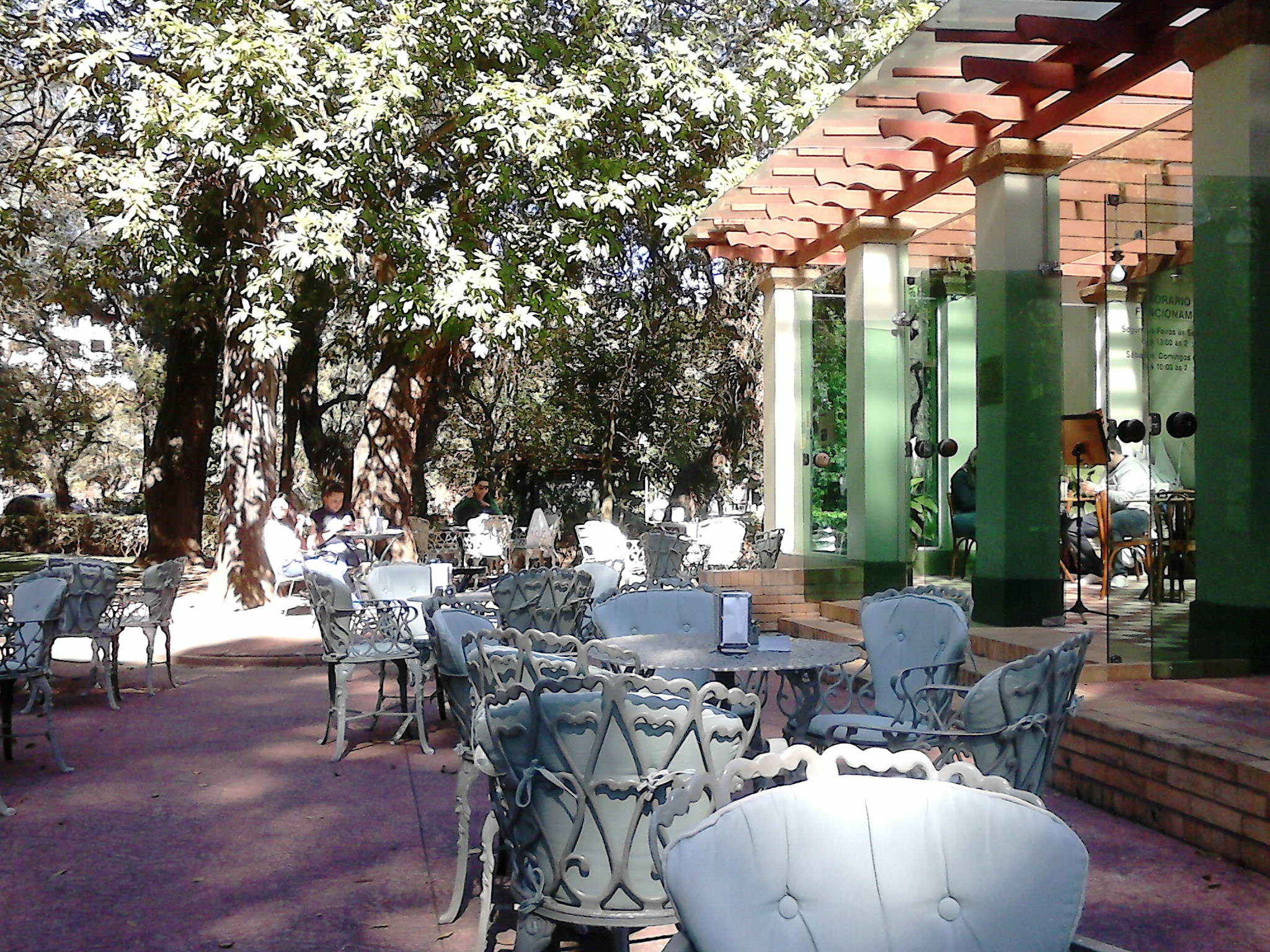
A sidewalk cafe in Minas Gerais, Brazil

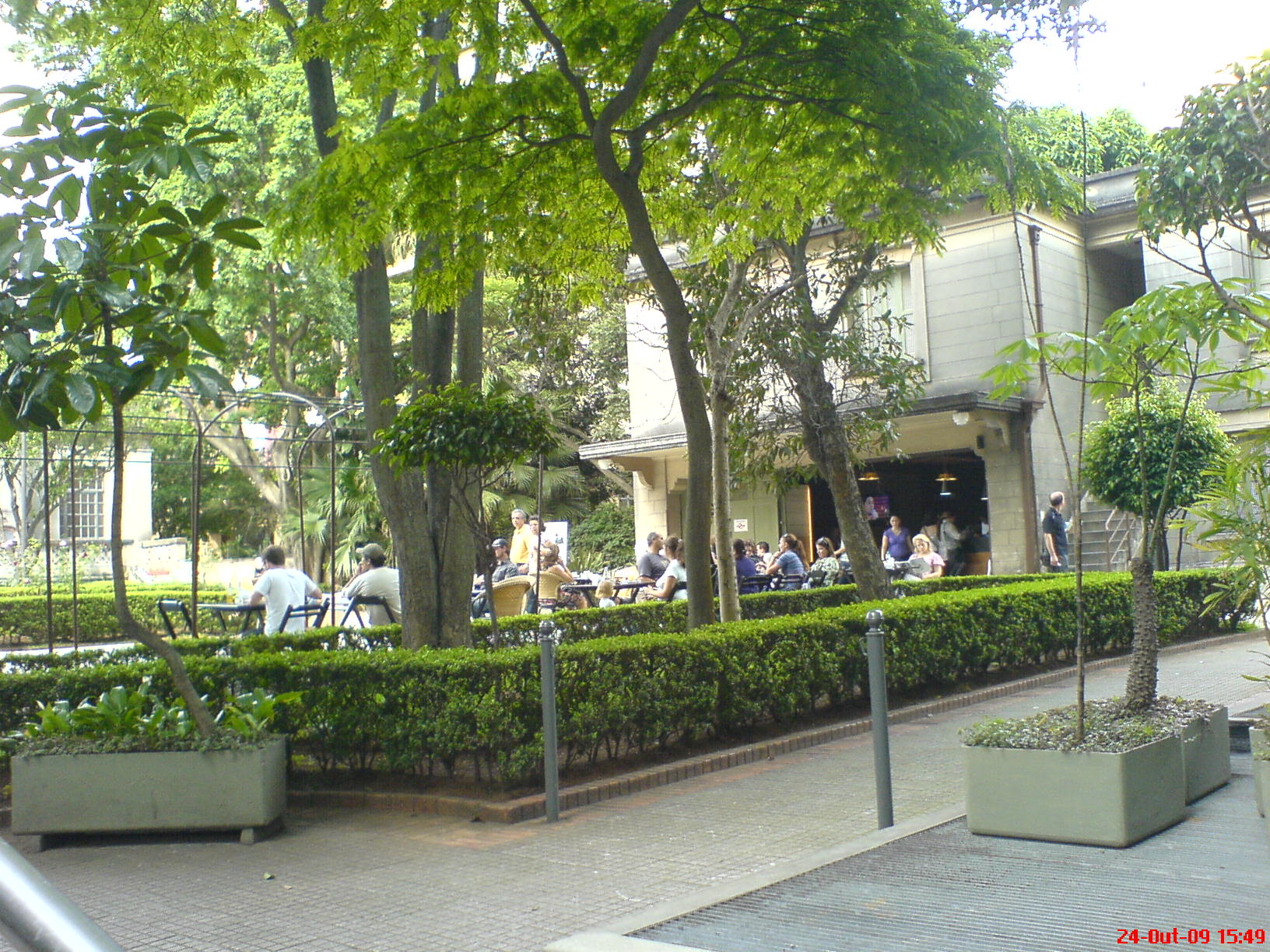
Café at Casa das Rosas, Brazil

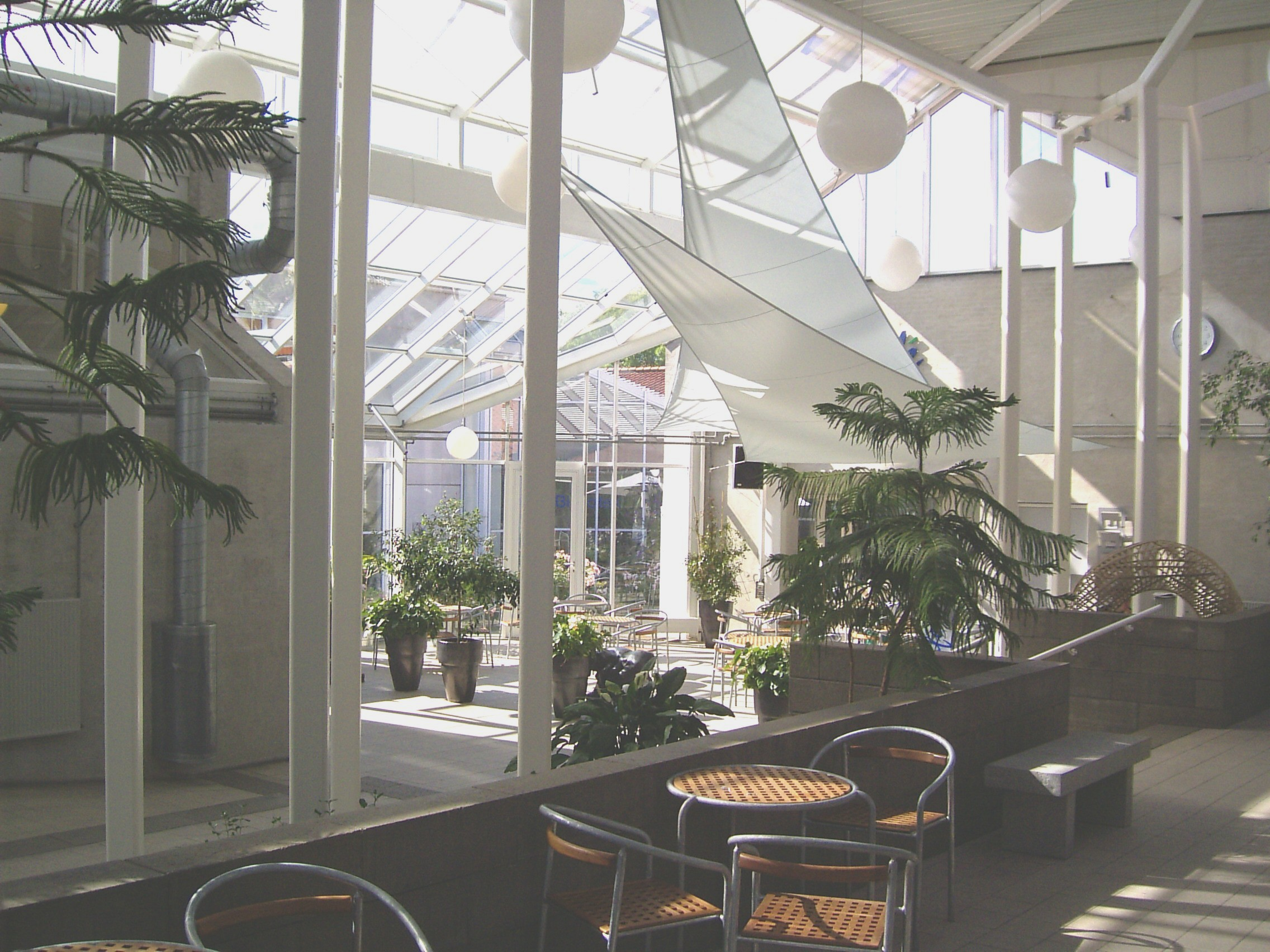
A café in Farum, Denmark

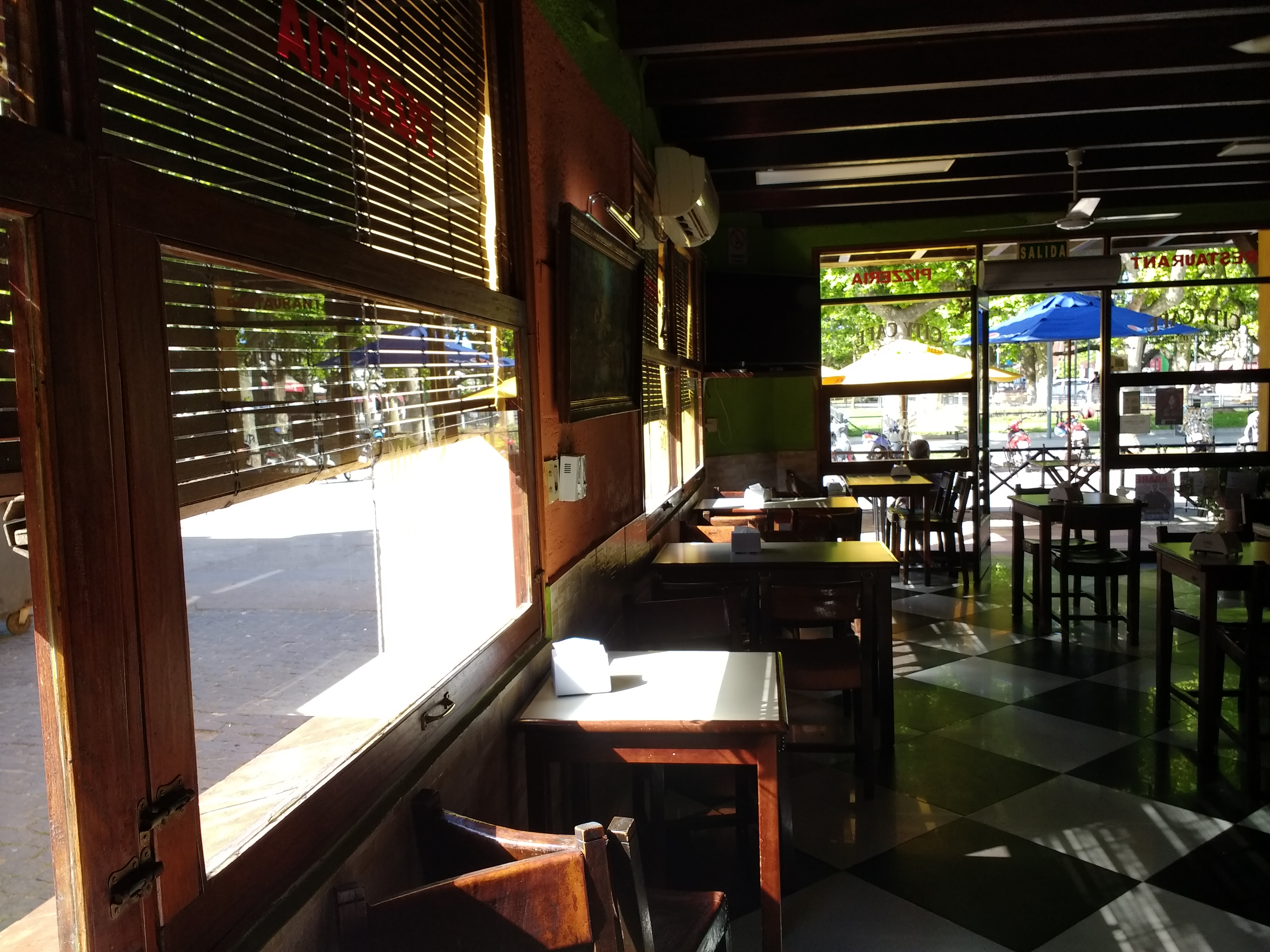
City café, Rocha, Uruguay

== See also ==
- All-day café
- Animal cafe
- Butler café
- Caffè sospeso
- Cat café
- Coffee service
- Coffeehouse culture of Baghdad
- Crisis cafe
- Dog café
- History of coffee
- List of coffeehouse chains
- Maid café
- Manga cafe
