= Chocolate café =

Café specializing in drinking chocolate

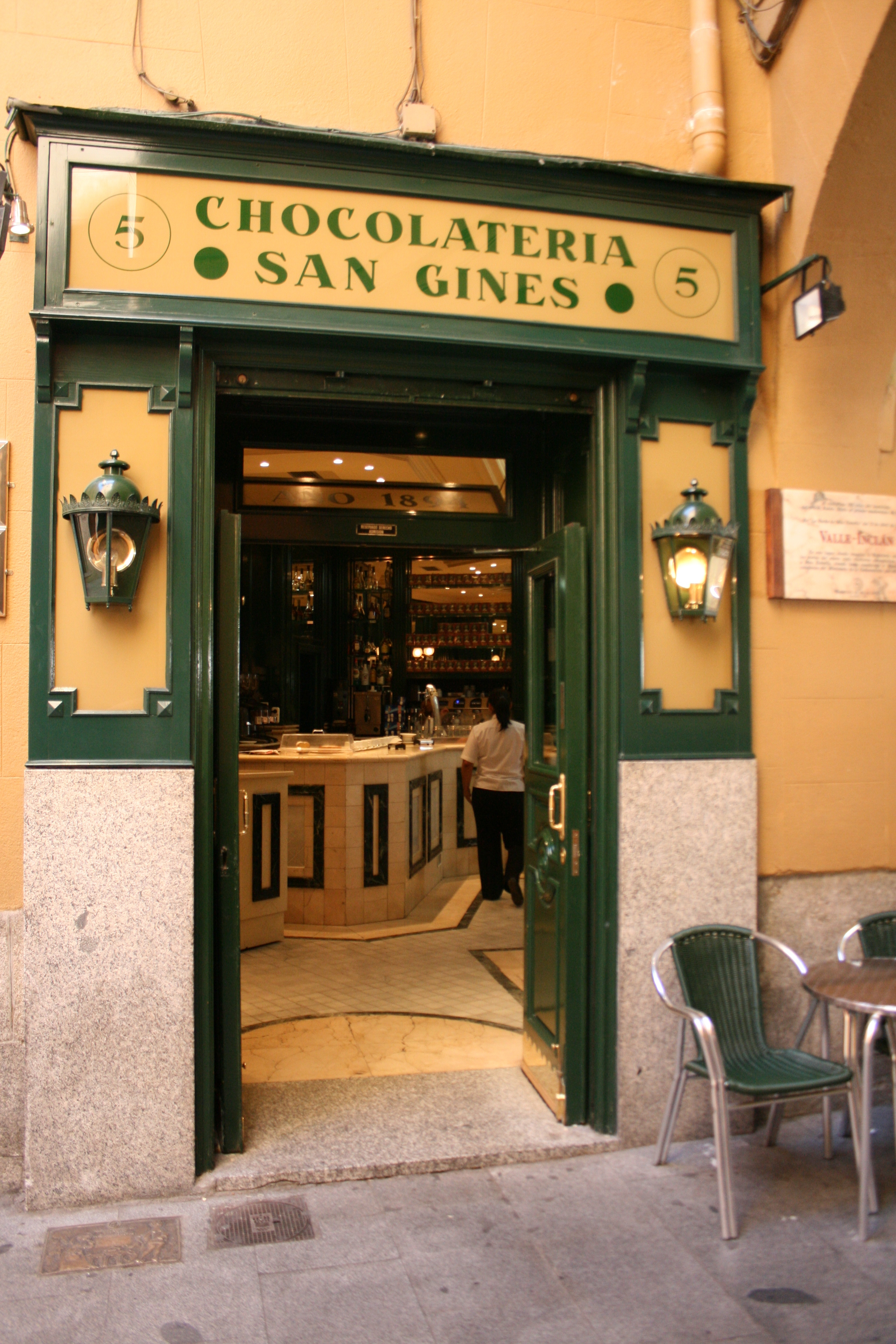
Chocolatería San Ginés in Madrid, open since 1894

Menu boards for cacao drinks and coffee-chocolate combinations at Tierra Garat, Mexico City

Dining room of the original Churrería El Moro on Eje Central, Mexico City

A chocolate café, archaic "chocolate house", Spanish chocolatería, is a café that specializes in drinking chocolate. In Spanish the word has meant "a place where chocolate is served" since at least 1849, and the Spanish Academy's dictionary added that sense in 1914.

== History ==
=== England ===
Chocolate was on sale in London by the 1650s, often in coffeehouses. The first known chocolate house was opened in 1657 by a Frenchman in Queen's Head Alley near Bishopsgate, who advertised an "excellent West India drink". By the 1690s there were elite chocolate houses with an aristocratic clientele.

=== France ===
In 1659 Louis XIV made David Chaillou chocolatier du roi (chocolate maker to the king). His shop near the Louvre was one of the first in Paris to serve hot chocolate. Later came the salons de thé (tea rooms). Angelina, on the Rue de Rivoli, was opened in 1903 by the Austrian confectioner Antoine Rumpelmayer; it is known for its chocolat l'Africain, a hot chocolate so thick it is eaten with a spoon. Carette opened on the Place du Trocadéro in 1927.

=== Spain ===
Chocolatería San Ginés, a chocolate café and churrería, in an alley just off the Puerta del Sol in Madrid, opened in 1894; Madrid's tourist office calls it the city's most famous café for chocolate con churros (hot chocolate with churros).

=== Mexico ===
In Mexico City, Francisco Iriarte, from Elizondo in the Baztan Valley of Spain, opened Churrería El Moro in 1935 at no. 42 on what was then San Juan de Letrán street, now Eje Central. At Tierra Garat, a chain of about 50 cafés in Greater Mexico City, drinks combine coffee and cacao with flavors such as vanilla flower, pepper and chiltepín chile.
