= Churrería Porfirio =

Mexican churro franchise chain

- Branch at Campeche and Manzanillo streets, Roma Sur, Mexico City, in 2026
- Industry: Restaurants
- Founded: 2016
- Founder: Vladimir Ramírez and José Luis Uberetagoyena
- Number of locations: 240+ (2026)
- Revenue: US$16 million (2025)
- Parent: Franquicia Master
- Website: https://churreriaporfirio.com.mx/

Churrería Porfirio is a Mexican franchise chain of churro shops. Its first shop opened in 2016 in Colonia Roma, Mexico City, and by 2025 the chain had more than 240 locations in Mexico and abroad.

== History ==
The first Churrería Porfirio opened in 2016 on Calle Nuevo León in Colonia Roma. According to El Cronista, it was designed from the start with standardized recipes and processes so that it could be replicated as a franchise. It was founded by Vladimir Ramírez and José Luis Uberetagoyena, partners in the franchise company Franquicia Master.

In December 2017, El Financiero reported that Franquicia Master had sold eight Churrería Porfirio franchises in Mexico and two abroad, and described the brand as aiming to compete with Churrería El Moro in the "neighborhood churrería" segment. Besides Mexico City, it had branches in Querétaro and Tijuana, and abroad in Ecuador and Colombia.

By May 2024 the chain had 180 branches in Mexico, the United States, Central America and South America, and it had received the National Franchise Award in the food and beverage category. In March 2026, El Cronista reported that it had more than 240 units, 190 of them in Mexico and 52 abroad, in countries including Ecuador, Costa Rica and Colombia, and that its global revenue in 2025 was US$16 million.

== Concept ==
The shops are decorated in the style of the Porfiriato, the period of Mexican history under President Porfirio Díaz, with Talavera tile, beveled mirrors and copper finishes, according to cofounder Vladímir Ramírez. The menu centers on churros, and also includes churros with ice cream and several kinds of liquid chocolate.

== Presence across Mexico ==
As of November 2026 there were 98 franchises in Greater Mexico City and 79 elsewhere across the country, in 25 of the 31 Mexican states.

State	State/Entity	City/Area	No. of stores
Mexico City	50	Mexico City	50
Estado de México	48	Greater Mexico City	31
Estado de México	48	Toluca	7
Estado de México	48	Metepec	3
Estado de México	48	Ocoyoacac	2
Estado de México	48	San Mateo Atenco	2
Estado de México	48	Calimaya	1
Estado de México	48	Lerma	1
Puebla	11	Puebla	7
Puebla	11	San Andrés Cholula	1
Puebla	11	San Pedro Cholula	1
Puebla	11	Teziutlán	1
Puebla	11	Zacatlán	1
Hidalgo	8	Pachuca	3
Hidalgo	8	Mineral de la Reforma	2
Hidalgo	8	Huichapan	1
Hidalgo	8	Tepeji del Río	1
Hidalgo	8	Tula de Allende	1
Guanajuato	6	Celaya	1
Guanajuato	6	Guanajuato	1
Guanajuato	6	Irapuato	1
Guanajuato	6	León	1
Guanajuato	6	Moroleón	1
Guanajuato	6	San Miguel de Allende	1
Querétaro	6	Querétaro	5
Querétaro	6	Tepotzotlán	1
Chiapas	5	Tuxtla Gutiérrez	3
Chiapas	5	Comitán de Domínguez	1
Chiapas	5	San Cristóbal de las Casas	1
Veracruz	5	Boca del Río	1
Veracruz	5	Martínez de la Torre	1
Veracruz	5	Orizaba	1
Veracruz	5	Tuxpan	1
Veracruz	5	Veracruz	1

State	State/Entity	City/Area	No. of stores
Coahuila	4	Saltillo	3
Coahuila	4	Piedras Negras	1
Jalisco	4	Zapopan	2
Jalisco	4	Guadalajara	1
Jalisco	4	Tlaquepaque	1
Michoacán	4	Morelia	3
Michoacán	4	Lázaro Cárdenas	1
Yucatán	4	Mérida	3
Yucatán	4	Valladolid	1
Morelos	3	Atlatlahucan / Yautepec	1
Morelos	3	Cuautla	1
Morelos	3	Cuernavaca	1
Quintana Roo	3	Cancún	1
Quintana Roo	3	Chetumal	1
Quintana Roo	3	Playa del Carmen	1
Baja California	2	Ensenada	1
Baja California	2	Mexicali	1
Chihuahua	2	Chihuahua	2
Guerrero	2	Acapulco	1
Guerrero	2	Chilpancingo	1
Tlaxcala	2	Apizaco	1
Tlaxcala	2	Santa Ana Chiautempan	1
Aguascalientes	1	Aguascalientes	1
Colima	1	Colima	1
Nuevo León	1	Monterrey	1
Oaxaca	1	Oaxaca	1
San Luis Potosí	1	San Luis Potosí	1
Sonora	1	Hermosillo	1
Tabasco	1	Villahermosa	1
Tamaulipas	1	Reynosa	1

No stores in Baja California Sur, Campeche, Durango, Nayarit, Sinaloa, or Zacatecas

Total: 25 states + Mexico City	Total: 47 cities + Greater Mexico City	177 stores

== Outside Mexico ==
As of November 2026 there were franchises in eight countries beyond Mexico, including Colombia, the United States, and all Central American countries except Belize.

Country	City / Metropolitan area	#	Branches included
Colombia	Bogotá	3	Centro Comercial Outlet Factory, Mallplaza NQS, Plaza Imperial
Colombia	Villavicencio	1	Bistro (Av. 40)
Costa Rica	Heredia	1	Mercado Gastronómico (Fátima)
Costa Rica	San José	1	Paseo Colón (Gran Vía Plaza Comercial)
El Salvador	San Salvador metropolitan area	2	Plaza Madero (Antiguo Cuscatlán), Plaza Mundo Soyapango (Soyapango)
Guatemala	Guatemala City	3	Centro Comercial Vidére (Zona 15), Oakland Place (Zona 10), Plaza Varietá (Zona 16)
Guatemala	Huehuetenango	1	Plaza Once (Sector 2 Cambote)
Honduras	Choluteca	1	Unimall (Blvr. Chorotega)
Honduras	Danlí	2	Centro Comercial Paseo Las Colinas, Plaza Hills City
Honduras	San Pedro Sula	1	Town Center (C.P. 21103)
Honduras	Tegucigalpa	4	City Mall Tegucigalpa, Distrito El Camino (Carretera a Valle de Ángeles), Ventu Life Center, Plaza Valencia
Nicaragua	Managua	1	Plaza Once (Carretera a Masaya, km 11)
Panama	Panama City	2	Plaza El Cangrejo, Plaza New York (Marbella / Calle 53 Este)
United States	The Woodlands, Texas	1	Woodlands (25750 Kuykendahl Rd)
Total		24	
