= Yautepec =

Yautepec may refer to:

- San Bartolo Yautepec, town and municipality in Oaxaca
- San Carlos Yautepec, town and municipality in Oaxaca
- Yautepec District, district of Oaxaca
- Yautepec de Zaragoza, town and municipality in Morelos

== See also ==
- Yautepec Zapotec (disambiguation)
