= Mercado González =

Food hall and supermarket in Costa Mesa, California

- Interactive location map of Mercado González
- Location: Costa Mesa, California, U.S.
- Coordinates: 33.6571°N 117.9171°W
- Address: 2300 Harbor Boulevard
- Opened: November 17, 2023
- Owner: Northgate González Market
- Architect: Shook Kelley
- Floor area: 70,000 sq ft (6,500 m^{2})
- Website: www.northgatemarket.com/mercado

Mercado González is a Mexican-style marketplace and food hall in Costa Mesa, Orange County, California, in Greater Los Angeles. The Mercado is run by the supermarket chain Northgate González Market. It opened in November 2023, in a 70,000 sq ft (6,500 m^{2}) building that had been an Albertsons supermarket. It is the company's largest store format.

== Description ==
The store is modeled on traditional Mexican mercados (markets), such as those in Coyoacán in Mexico City and 20 de Noviembre in Oaxaca. It stands at 2300 Harbor Boulevard, at the northeast corner of Wilson Street. The design is by the architecture firm Shook Kelley, and each product category is run as its own puesto (stall), with its own name and look.

Reports at the opening counted more than 20 food stalls, while others counted more than two dozen or more than 27. The market also has a fine-dining restaurant, Maizano, and a bar called Entre Nos.

Churrería El Moro, the Mexico City churrería, opened a stall in the market, its first in the United States, after the company said it wanted to partner with Northgate to grow in California. The stall Chiva Torta, which sells tortas ahogadas, moved in from outside Northgate's closed store in downtown Santa Ana.

== History ==
Northgate González Market announced the Costa Mesa store as a new retail concept and opened it on November 17, 2023, with a ceremony that included a priest's blessing, a mariachi band and folklórico dancers. It was Northgate's 44th store. In June 2026 the company said a second Mercado, in Los Angeles, was in the works and was expected to open within 14 months.

== Northgate González Market ==
Northgate González Market is a family-owned supermarket chain based in Anaheim, California, that started in 1980. Its first store was a former liquor store in Anaheim. Don Miguel González Jiménez and his wife, Teresa, had 13 children, and the family still runs the company. In 2023 the chain had 44 stores in Orange, Los Angeles and other counties, and in 2026 it had 46. It reported sales of $1.6 billion for 2025, and the brothers Oscar González and Jesus González share the chief executive role.
