= Tierra Garat =

Mexican coffeehouse chain

Sign at Guanajuato and Insurgentes, Roma Norte, 2026

Tierra Garat is a Mexican hybrid coffeehouse-chocolate café chain owned by Sabormex, part of Grupo La Costeña, that operates in Greater Mexico City. Its first café opened at Jalapa and Tabasco in Colonia Roma Norte in April 2016. It serves coffee, hot and cold chocolate, and drinks made with both coffee and cacao.

== History ==
Sabormex, which already sold packaged coffee under the Garat brand, opened Tierra Garat to enter the coffeehouse business. In October 2016, it announced plans to have 70 cafés by 2020, at an estimated cost of three to four million pesos (160,000–214,000 USD) per location.

The chain had 12 cafés in Mexico City in October 2018. Its director, Alejandro Chaparro, said competition for premises had driven up prices and delayed expansion. The company sought street-corner premises in neighbourhoods rather than shopping centres.

In November 2026, the company's website listed 50 locations in Mexico City and the State of Mexico.

== Design and menu ==
Héctor Esrawe and Ignacio Cadena designed the cafés. The Roma branch has terracotta-coloured interiors, with leather, woven materials, clay and wicker inspired by Mexican ranches.

Its coffee and cacao drinks include mixtures with vanilla, chilli and allspice. In 2016, Time Out México gave the Roma café four out of five stars.

== Gallery ==
Exterior of café at Manzanillo and Coahuila, Roma Sur, 2026

Interior of the café at Guanajuato and Insurgentes, Roma Norte, 2026

Menu boards for cacao drinks and mochas, 2026

Counter at Guanajuato and Insurgentes, Roma Norte, 2026
