= Yautepec Zapotec =

Yautepec Zapotec may be:

- Any of several Yautepec Zapotec languages
- The more divergent San Bartolo Yautepec
