= Chocolatería San Ginés =

Café in Madrid, Spain

Coordinates: 40°25′00″N 3°42′25″W

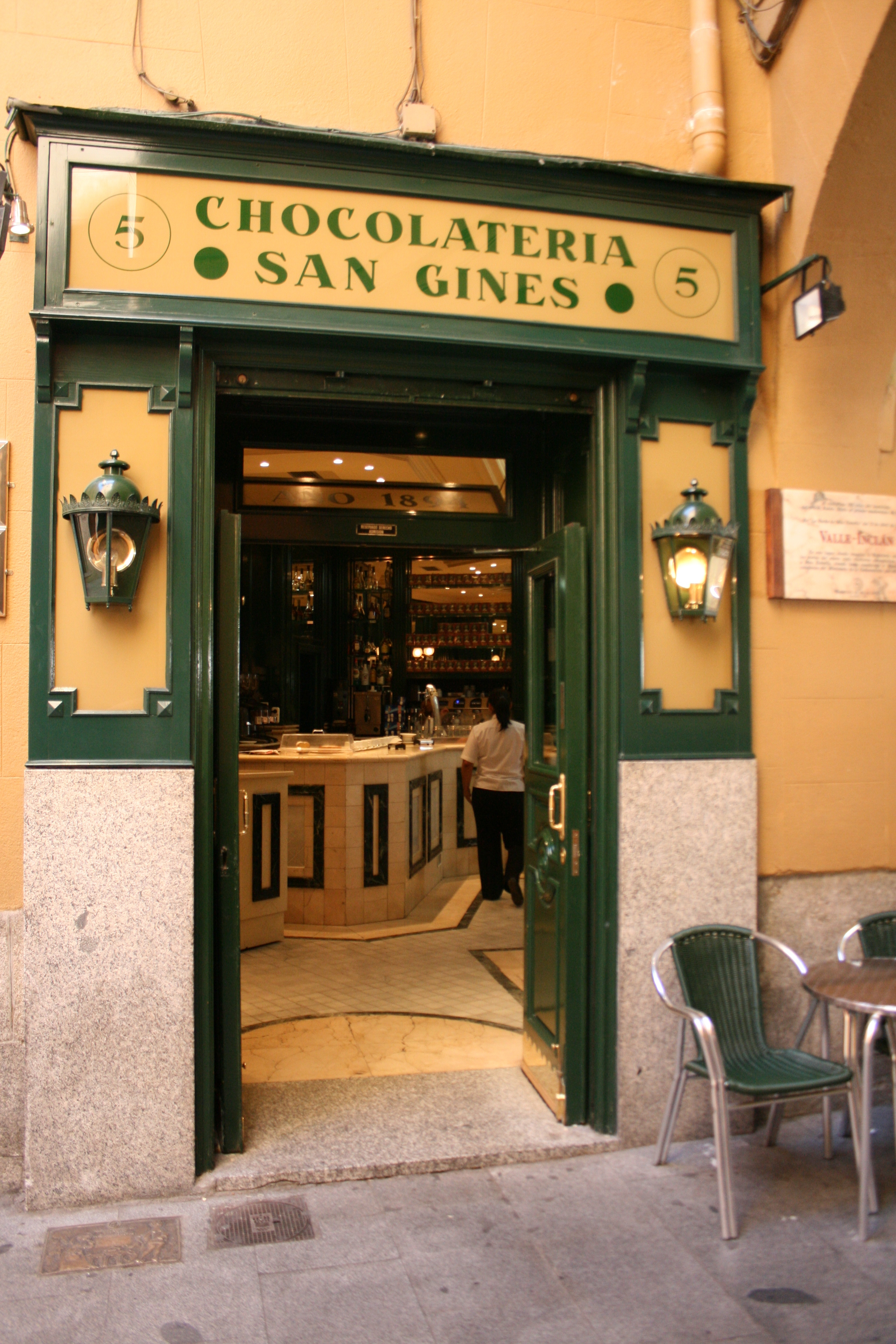
The entrance to the Chocolatería

The Chocolatería San Ginés is a café at Pasadizo de San Ginés, 5, in central Madrid, in a passageway close to San Ginés church, west of the Puerta del Sol. It has served principally chocolate con churros (hot chocolate and churros) since 1894.

== History ==
The building originally opened as a restaurant and inn in 1890; it began serving churros in 1894.

In recent years, it has expanded its main Madrid location into buildings next door, and it is open 24 hours.

== International branches ==
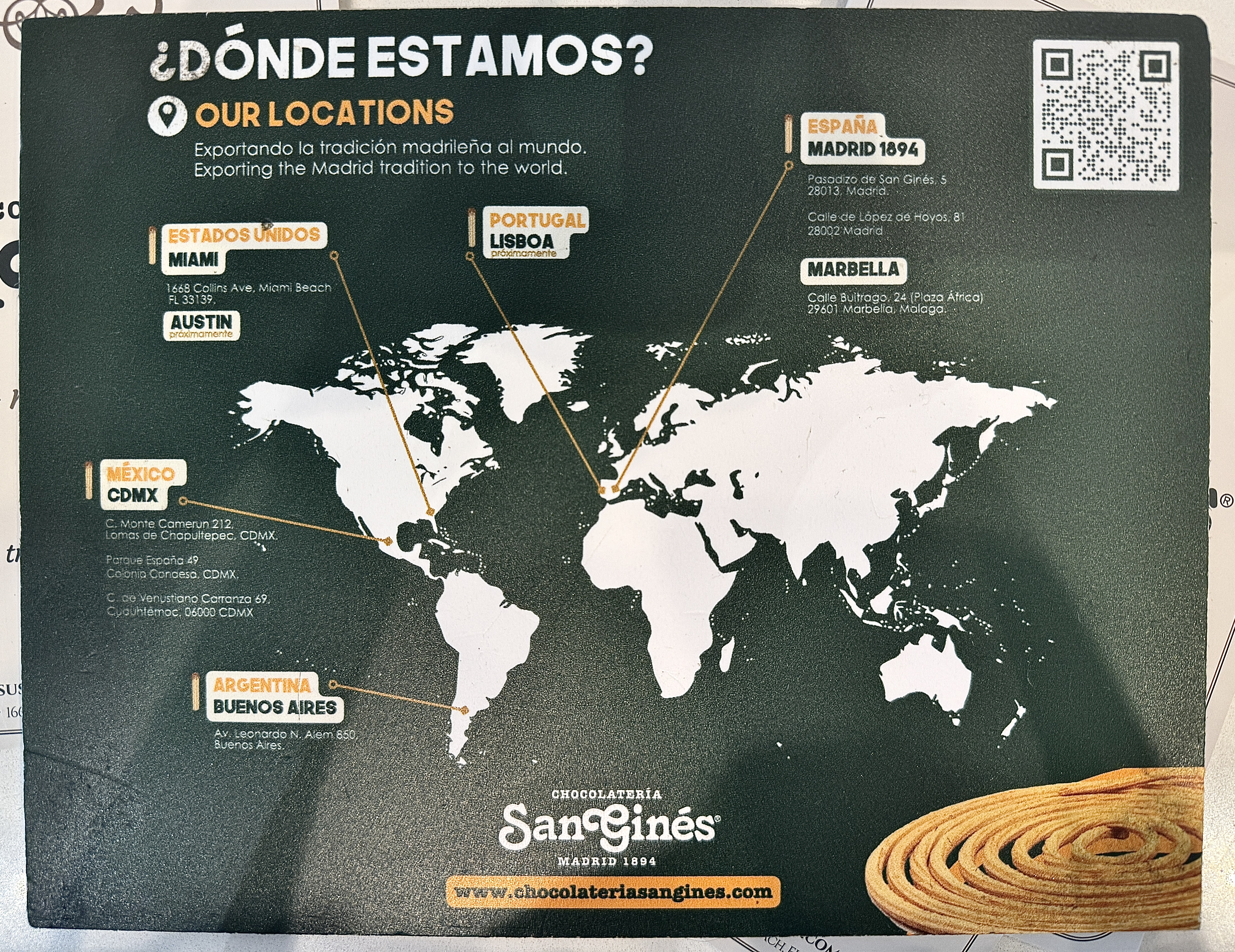
World map of San Ginés branches as displayed in the Miami Beach branch January 2025. Mexico branches are no longer in operation, while the Philippine branch opened in 2026.

The restaurant has branches in Marbella, Spain; in Cais do Sodré in Lisbon, Portugal; in Austin, Texas, and Miami Beach, Florida, in the United States; in the Mercado de los Carruajes in Buenos Aires, Argentina; and at The Podium in Mandaluyong, Philippines.

There were 3 locations in Mexico City on Parque España in Colonia Condesa, the Historic Center of Mexico City and in Lomas de Chapultepec. However, these are closed as of 2025.

In 2010, a San Ginés branch opened in Shibuya, Tokyo (Japan). However, it closed a year later.

== In popular culture ==
This cafe has been mentioned in multiple literary works, including Los Episodios OkNacionales by Benito Pérez Galdós and Luces de Bohemia by Valle Inclán.

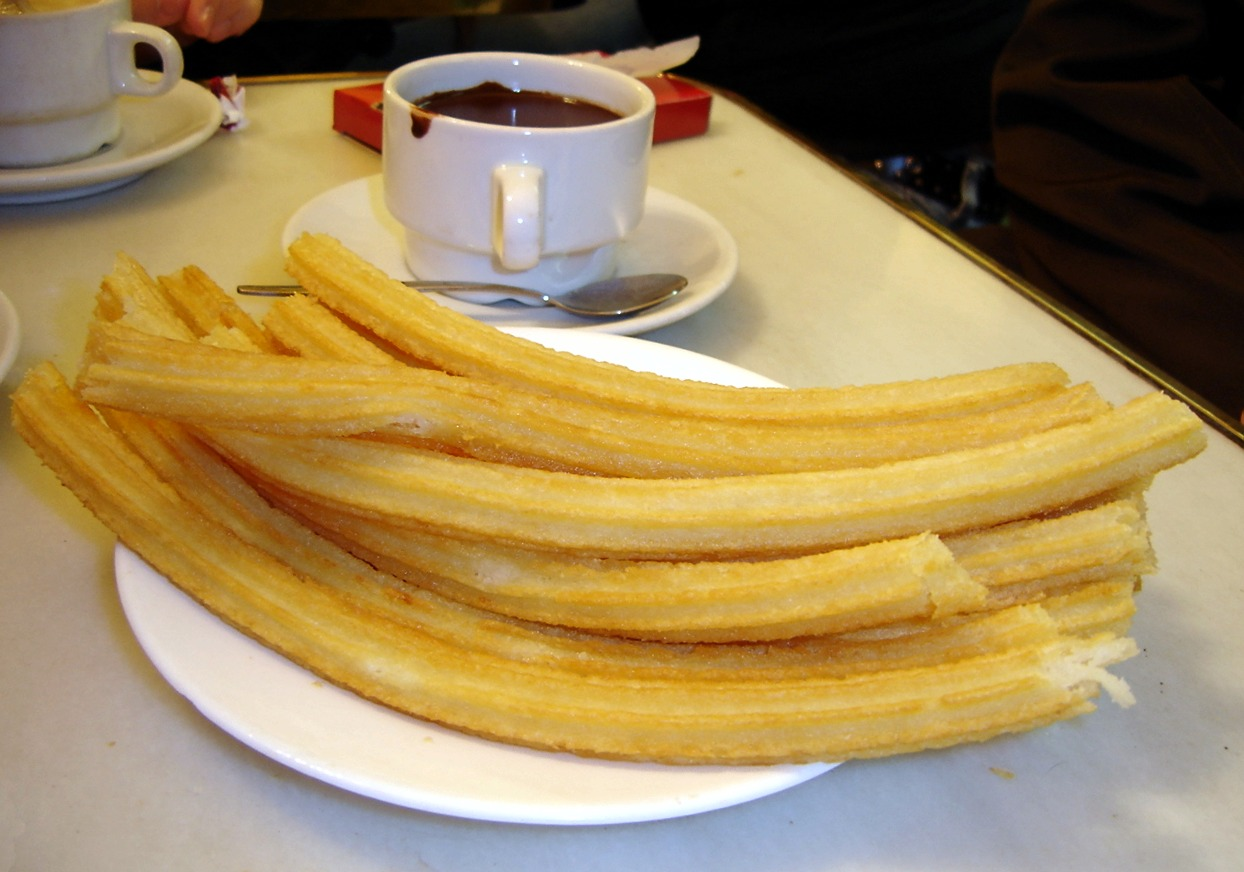
Chocolate con churros served at San Ginés
