= Churrería El Moro =

Mexican churro shop chain

- The original shop on Eje Central, 2025
- Interactive map of Churrería El Moro

Restaurant information
- Established: 1935
- Owner: Iriarte family
- Food type: Churros, hot chocolate
- Location: Eje Central Lázaro Cárdenas 42, Centro Histórico, Mexico City, Mexico
- Coordinates: 19.431311°N 99.141212°W
- Other locations: 20 (17 in Mexico City, 3 in California)
- Website: elmoro.mx

Churrería El Moro (also called El Moro) is a chain of churro shops in Mexico City and Southern California. For almost eight decades after it opened in 1935, it was a single shop: the one founded by the Spanish immigrant Francisco Iriarte at Eje Central Lázaro Cárdenas 42 in the Centro Histórico, which stays open 24 hours a day and became a well-known stop in the city center. After 79 years in business at a single location, in 2014 the family's third generation opened a second branch, in the Mercado Roma food hall, and the company has since opened on-street branches in upscale, walkable neighborhoods such as Condesa, Roma Norte and Polanco, in shopping malls, and in Greater Los Angeles, California.

As of November 2026 the company operates 17 branches in Mexico City and three in Greater Los Angeles.

== History ==
=== Origins ===
Francisco Iriarte came from Elizondo, a village in the Baztan Valley in Navarre, Spain, and moved to Mexico City in 1933. Finding that nobody sold churros there, he began selling them from a cart near the Zócalo, with sugar, cinnamon and hot chocolate. He named the business "El Moro" (the Moor) after a churro vendor in his hometown. According to Animal Gourmet, the vendor dressed as a Moor and sold churros at festivals.

In 1935 he bought a shop at number 42 of Avenida San Juan de Letrán, now Eje Central Lázaro Cárdenas, and opened El Moro there. It is often called the oldest churrería in Mexico City. Iriarte died in 1940, and his brothers José, Santiago and Ignacio came from Spain to run the business. Some sources say instead that the shop was founded by the brothers Francisco and José.

Press coverage names the comedians Cantinflas and Tin Tan and the writers Carlos Fuentes and Octavio Paz among its well-known customers. For decades it was a single shop. In 2013 Animal Gourmet put its customers at about 500 a day, and said its readers had voted it the best place for churros in Mexico.

=== Expansion in Mexico City ===
In June 2014 the family opened a second shop, in Mercado Roma, with an investment of 750,000 pesos. Santiago Iriarte, a great-nephew of the founder and now the company's director general, saw the market as a platform for growth. The family hired the designer Nacho Cadena, who also worked on Mercado Roma, to rework the brand, and the new shop was the first to use it. In 2015 the firm Cadena + Asociados completed a refurbishment and a new graphic identity for El Moro, based on classic wall tiles and stained glass and on Mexico's Art Deco era.

A branch in the Condesa, on Calle Michoacán, opened in June 2017 as the sixth. By September 2017 there were six, including the original, and four more were planned that year to reach ten. The company said then that it had no plans to franchise, but was open to a partner for openings in other states.

By August 2023 there were 15 locations in Mexico, and that November the magazine Whitepaper counted 16, with four more planned. Each shop is typically 200–250 m² (2,200–2,700 sq ft) with about ten employees, and the company has built industrial processes so that each one can produce churros in volume. A branch in Santa María la Ribera opened on 27 August 2026. As of November 2026 all 17 branches in Mexico were in Mexico City.

=== United States ===
In November 2023 El Moro opened its first U.S. shop, inside Mercado González, a food hall in a Northgate González Market supermarket in Costa Mesa. A shop in Echo Park, at 1524 Sunset Boulevard in a former burger restaurant, was announced in October 2024 and opened on 29 January 2026. A third shop, at 1327 West Whittier Boulevard in La Habra, is also listed on the company's website. In March 2026 LAist reported that a shop in Culver City was planned by the end of the year.

== Menu ==
The original recipe is flour, water and a little salt, which makes the churros vegan. They are dusted with cinnamon sugar and sold singly, by the four or by the dozen, or as bite-size "moritos", with dips such as chocolate, condensed milk, cajeta and hazelnut chocolate. Hot chocolate comes in several styles. The Mexico City government's tourism site lists El Español (thick and sweet), El Francés (semisweet, with vanilla), El Mexicano (light and frothy, with cinnamon), El Suizo (semibitter, with whipped cream) and El Especial (strongly flavored with cinnamon). There are also "consuelos", spiral churro sandwiches filled with ice cream, as well as milkshakes and coffee, and some branches serve tortas.

Time Out has called El Moro Mexico City's most popular churrería.

== Geographical presence ==
Condesa branch on Avenida Michoacán, facing Parque México, 2026

After almost 80 years as a one-location institution downtown, El Moro has since opened branches in on-street locations in upscale walkable neighborhoods like Condesa and Roma, as well as in some malls in the farther reaches of the city:

=== Mexico City ===
Original location
| Branch | Area | Location | Opened |
|---|---|---|---|
| Centro Histórico | Centro Histórico | Eje Central Lázaro Cárdenas (original shop; open 24 hours) | 1935 |

On-street branches
| Branch | Area | Location | Opened |
|---|---|---|---|
| Condesa | Condesa | Avenida Michoacán | June 2017 |
| Roma Norte | Roma Norte | Frontera | |
| Polanquito | Polanco | Julio Verne | |
| Mariano Escobedo | Polanco | Mariano Escobedo | |
| Cuauhtémoc | Colonia Cuauhtémoc | Río Lerma | |
| Zona Rosa | Zona Rosa, Colonia Juárez | Génova | March 2018 |
| Azcapotzalco | Azcapotzalco | Avenida Cuitláhuac | |
| Coyoacán | Coyoacán | Felipe Carrillo Puerto | |
| Del Valle | Colonia Del Valle | Amores | |
| La Basílica | Villa Gustavo A. Madero | Abasolo, facing the Basilica of Our Lady of Guadalupe | |
| Santa María la Ribera | Santa María la Ribera | Jaime Torres Bodet, corner of Salvador Díaz Mirón | August 2026 |

Mall branches
| Branch | Area | Location | Opened |
|---|---|---|---|
| Oceanía | Moctezuma | Encuentro Oceanía mall | |
| Parque Tepeyac | Granjas Modernas, Gustavo A. Madero | Parque Tepeyac mall | |
| Artz Pedregal | Jardines del Pedregal | Artz Pedregal mall | |
| Gran Terraza Coapa | Tlalpan | Gran Terraza Coapa mall | |
| Parque La Mexicana | Santa Fe | Parque La Mexicana mall | |

=== Greater Los Angeles ===
Greater Los Angeles branches
| Branch | Area | Location | Opened |
|---|---|---|---|
| Costa Mesa | Costa Mesa | Mercado González | November 2023 |
| Echo Park | Echo Park, Los Angeles | Sunset Boulevard | January 2026 |
| La Habra | La Habra | Whittier Boulevard | |

== Gallery ==
Queue at the original shop, 2025

Cooks at the original shop, 2025

Cook cutting meat for tortas al pastor, 2025

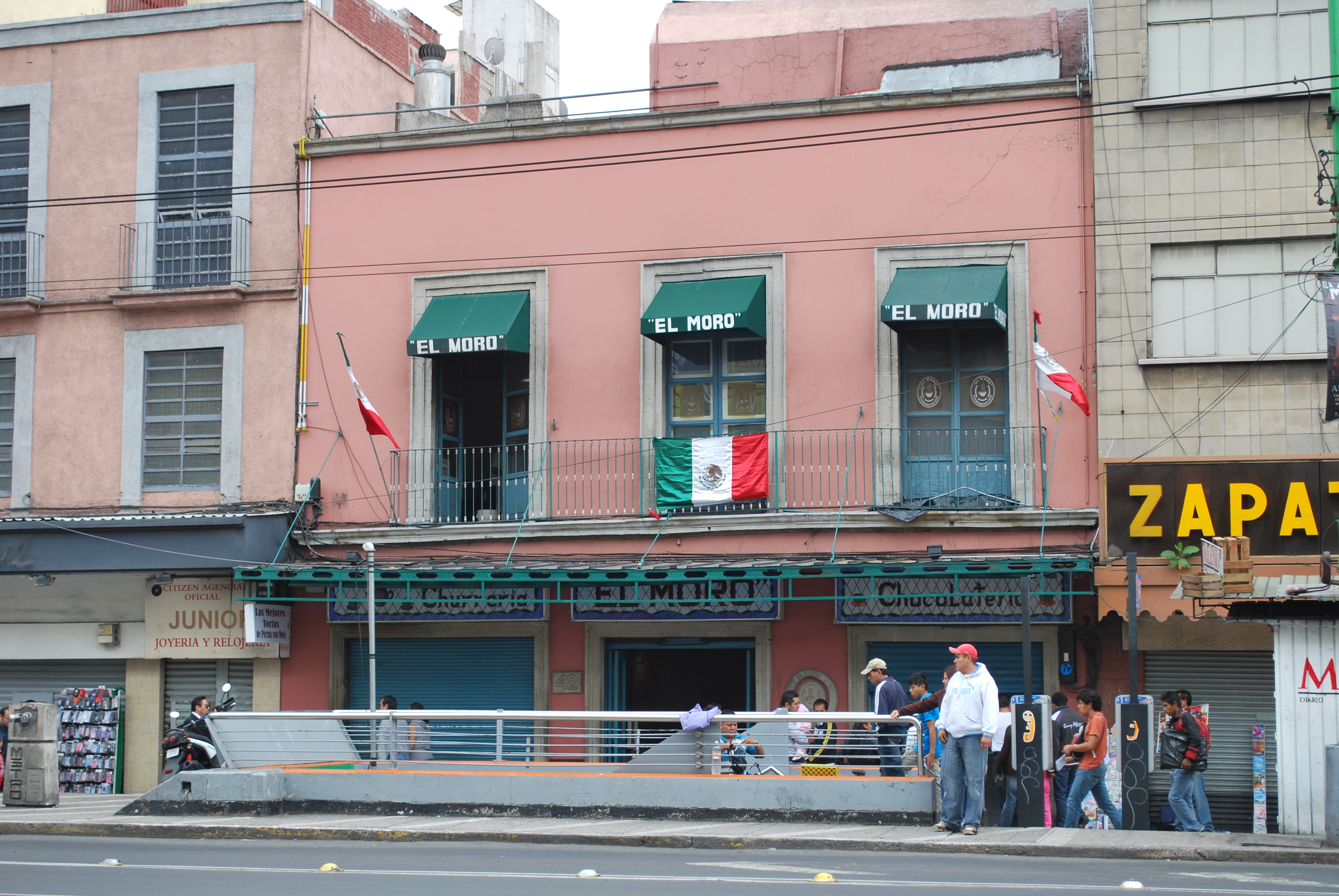
The original shop, 2011

Condesa branch, 2026

Condesa branch, 2026

Condesa branch, 2026

Condesa branch, 2026

Condesa branch, 2026

Parque Tepeyac branch, 2025
