= List of Danish furniture designers =

This is a list of Danish furniture designers. Summary biographies and background on many of the most important players can be found in the Danish modern article which covers Denmark's richest furniture design period.

- Rigmor Andersen, 1903-1995
- Jens Ammundsen, 1944-
- Gunnar Aagaard Andersen, 1919-1982
- Per Holland Bastrup 1949-
- Torben Bay, 1975-
- Niels Bendtsen, 1943-
- Annelise Bjørner, 1932-
- Per Borre, 1946-
- Erik Buch, 1923-1972
- Flemming Busk, 1967-
- Poul Cadovius, 1911-2011
- Louise Campbell, 1970-
- Sophy A. Christensen, 1867–1955
- Poul Christiansen, 1947-
- Erling Christoffersen, 1953-
- Ebbe Clemmensen, 1917-2002
- Karen Clemmensen, 1917-2001
- Hans Dall, 1937-
- Nanna Ditzel, 1923-2005
- Povl Bjerregaard Eskildsen, 1954-
- Preben Fabricius, 1931-1984
- Johannes Foersom, 1947-
- Knud Friis, 1926-
- Jørgen Gammelgaard, 1938-1991
- Niels Gammelgaard, 1944-
- Ebbe Gehl, 1942-
- Ole Gjerløv-Knudsen, 1930-
- Kaj Gottlob, 1887-1976
- Ditte Hammerstrøm, 1971-
- Andreas Hansen, 1936-
- Roald Steen Hansen, 1942-
- Gunvor Haugesen, 1939-1995
- Niels Jørgen Haugesen, 1936-
- Piet Hein 1905-1996
- Frits Henningsen c. 1900 – c. 1970
- Poul Henningsen, 1894-1967
- Anders Hermansen, 1960-
- Stephan B. Hertzog, 1969-
- Ole Hervit, 1930-
- Peter Hiort Lorenzen, 1943-
- Hans Sandgren Jakobsen, 1963-
- Cathrine Horsbøl, 1872–1947
- Niels Hvass, 1958-
- Arne Karlsen, 1927-
- Erik Krogh, 1942-
- Rolf Hay, 1968–
- Knud Holscher, 1930-
- Søren Holst, 1947-
- Alfred Homann, 1948-
- Christian Hvidt, 1946-
- Flemming Hvidt, 1944-
- Peter Hvidt, 1916-1986
- Jørgen Høj, 1925-
- Hans Isbrand, 1941-
- Lise Isbrand, 1942-
- A. J. Iversen, 1888-1979
- Arne Jacobsen, 1902-1971
- Jacob Jensen, 1926-2015
- Grete Jalk, 1920-2005
- Finn Juhl, 1912-1989
- Erik Ole Jørgensen, 1925-2002
- Edvard Kindt-Larsen, 1901-1982
- Tove Kindt-Larsen, 1906-
- Bodil Kjær, 1932-
- Poul Kjærholm, 1929-1980
- Kaare Klint, 1888-1954
- Mogens Koch, 1898-1992
- Ejner Larsen, 1917-1987
- Mogens Lassen, 1901-1987
- Vilhelm Lauritzen, 1894–1984
- Dan Ljungar, 1966-
- Aksel Bender Madsen, 1916-2000
- Cecilie Manz, 1970-
- Grethe Meyer, 1918-2008
- Børge Mogensen, 1914-1972
- Elmar Moltke Nielsen, 1924-1997
- Peder Moos, 1906-1991
- Orla Mølgaard-Nielsen, 1907-1993
- Søren Nissen, 1944-
- Arne Hovmand-Olsen, 1919-1989
- Hans Olsen 1919–1992
- Steen Ostergaard, 1935-
- Kurt Ostervig (1912–1986)
- Ole Palsby, 1935-
- Verner Panton, 1926-1998
- Thomas Pedersen, 1971-
- Bernt Petersen, 1937-
- Søren Ulrik Petersen, 1961-
- Kasper Salto, 1967-
- Frits Schlegel, 1896-1965
- Magnus Læssøe Stephensen, 1903-1984
- Christina Strand, 1968-
- Dan Svarth, 1942-
- Johnny Sørensen, 1944-
- Rud Thygesen, 1932-
- Jørn Utzon, 1918-2008
- Dark van Draebik, 1980-
- Kristian Vedel, 1923-2003
- Ole Wanscher, 1903-1985
- Hans Wegner, 1914-2007
- Arne Vodder, 1926-2009
- Poul M. Volther, 1923-2001
- Vilhelm Wohlert, 1920-2007

== See also ==
- Danish modern devoted above all to mid-20th century furniture design
- Danish design on all aspects of contemporary design
- Cane-line
