= Celebrity (dinghy) =

Development
- Designer: Stanley W. Evanson, Johann Wester
- Year: 1952
- Builder: P. Evanson Boat Company

Boat
- Draft: 3.25 ft (0.99 m)

Hull
- Type: monohull, sloop
- Construction: fiberglass, mahogany, Molded plywood
- Beam: 6.33 ft (1.93 m)

The Celebrity is an American sailing dinghy designed by Stanley Evanson.

== Design ==
The Celebrity was inspired by designs found in the Friesland area of Netherlands known as bergumermeer or "BM". While traveling in 1951, Stanley W. Evanson encountered the gaff rigged 16m² (aka "Sixteen Square") and collaborated with Johann Wester to design a sloop-rigged boat for use in the United States in 1952.

== Production ==
The first Celebrities were built in Holland and imported by the P. Evanson Boat Company in Philadelphia. The Dutch-built boats used a strip-planked mahogany hull following the methods used in the 16m². Spars were made from sitka spruce. To reduce costs, the design was modified in the 1960s to use molded plywood and the rudder was moved inboard astern of the skeg. The new design also offered Dacron sails. By the mid-1960s Evanson introduced Dutch-built fiberglass hulls that retained wooden cockpit trim. In 1972, Evanson created new fiberglass molds and moved production to Riverside, NJ.

P. Evanson Boat Company closed in 1986 and the fiberglass molds were acquired by Hampton Shipyards in East Quogue, NY. Hampton introduced a fully-fiberglass cockpit. The molds were acquired by Southport Island Marine in Southport, ME in 2008.
