= Egg (chair) =

Brand of furniture

Egg chair
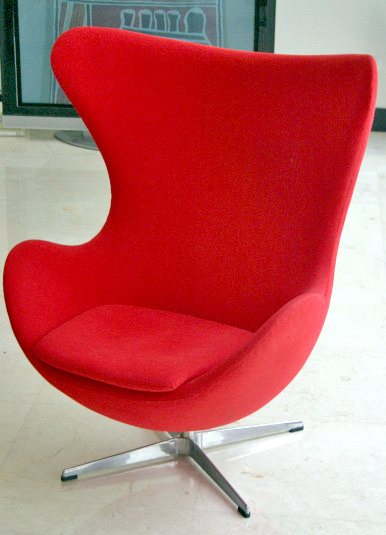
- The Egg Chair
- Designer: Arne Jacobsen
- Date: 1959
- Materials: Steel frame, fabric cover
- Style / tradition: Modernist
- Sold by: Fritz Hansen (Denmark)
- Height: 107 cm (42 in)
- Width: 87 cm (34 in)
- Depth: 79–95 cm (31–37 in)

The Egg is a chair designed by Arne Jacobsen in 1959 for the SAS Royal Hotel in Copenhagen, Denmark. It is manufactured by Republic of Fritz Hansen.

== Design ==
The Egg was designed in a typical Jacobsen style, using state-of-the-art material.

It is believed to be inspired by Eero Saarinen's "Womb chair", from which it borrows some traits.

Related to the Egg is the Swan chair and, to some degree, many of Jacobsen's plywood chairs, such as "7", the Ant, the Cigar, the Grand Prix-chair, the Pot, the Drop, and the Giraffe.

The Egg (like the Swan) was also designed as a couch. While the Swan couch is still in production, only a handful of Egg couches have ever been made. A few were made for the Radisson Hotel, and a few years back, some were made as a "special edition" couch. The price was relatively high—about 400,000 DKK, the equivalent of roughly US$75,000.

The reason for the limited production of the Egg couch, besides the desire for exclusivity, is the difficulty involved in making it, as well as a design flaw: the couch is too large to be covered by two entire cowhides, which is only just possible with the Egg chair. This leaves a very visible stitching down the middle of the couch. This problem can, however, be solved by using fabric instead of leather for the upholstery.

== In the media ==
According to an article in The New York Times, the Egg chair has also been used by McDonald's as part of a high-concept redesign of one of its restaurants in London. Furthermore, The Egg is in a McDonald's restaurant in Nørrebrogade, Copenhagen, among other furniture by Arne Jacobsen, although some are imitations.

It was used as the diary room chair in the first UK series of "Big Brother".

The newly renovated Terminal 2 at San Francisco International Airport features the Egg in its boarding area.

== See also ==
- Danish modern
- List of Danish furniture designers
- List of chairs
