= Swan (chair) =

Lounge chair designed by Arne Jacobsen

Swan chair
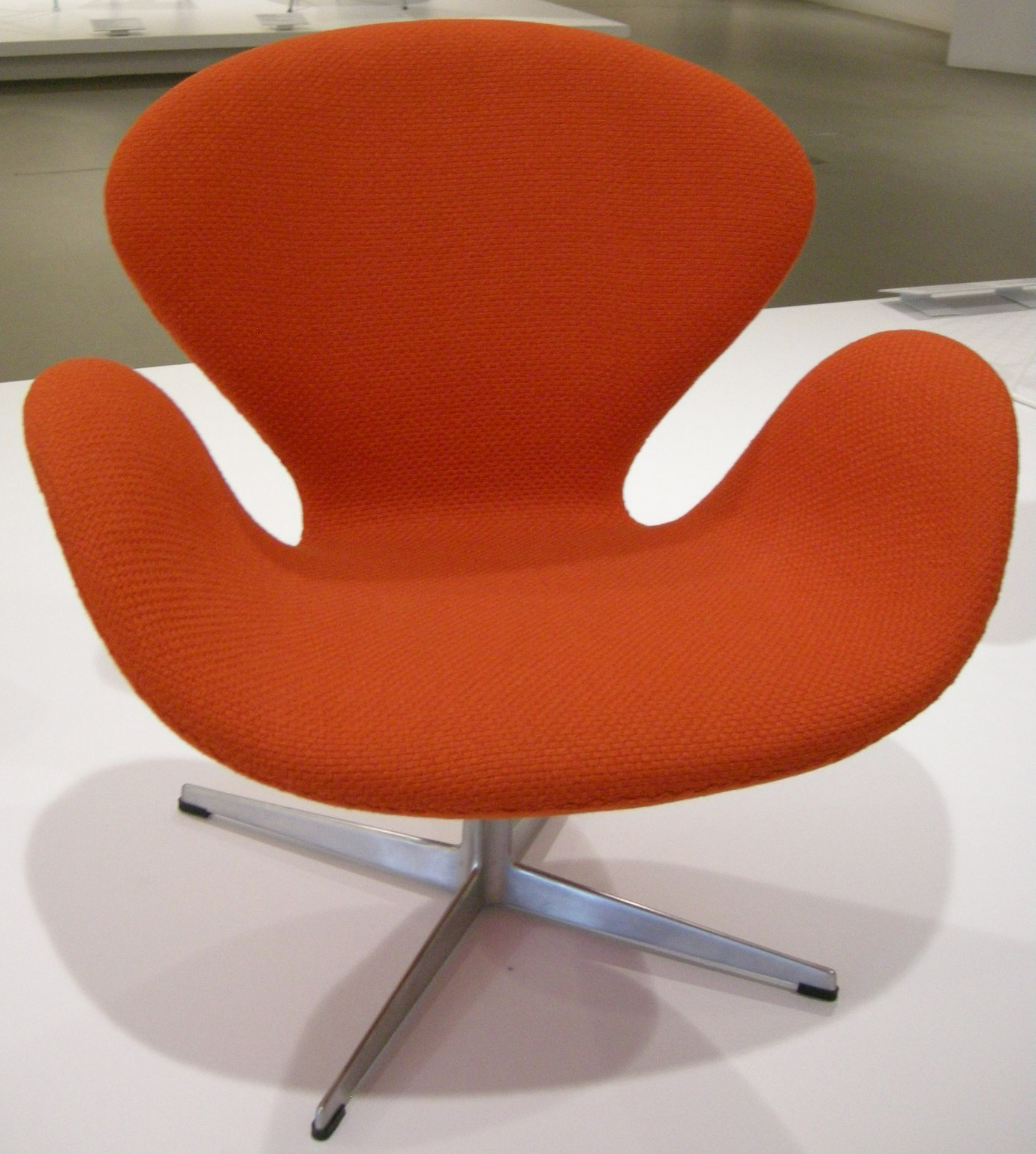
- Designer: Arne Jacobsen
- Date: 1958
- Materials: Steel frame, fabric or leather cover
- Style / tradition: Modernist/Danish modern
- Sold by: Fritz Hansen (Denmark)
- Height: 77 cm (30.3 in)
- Width: 74 cm (29.1 in)
- Depth: 68 cm (26.8 in)

The Swan is a lounge chair and sofa designed by Arne Jacobsen in the Danish modern style in 1958 for the SAS Royal Hotel in Copenhagen. It is manufactured by Danish furniture manufacturer Republic of Fritz Hansen.

Along with the Swan, Jacobsen also developed the Egg chair and other furniture, much of which did not get into mass production, like the Drop. The Swan couch is still in production.

Jacobsen not only used the Swan for the SAS Royal Hotel, but he also used it for his subsequent projects, such as Danmarks Nationalbank.

== Manufacture and materials ==
The Swan has been in production at Fritz Hansen ever since. It is available in several types of leather and fabric upholstery. The base is always star-shaped, made of satin-polished aluminium.

== See also ==
Other chairs by Jacobsen include:

- Ant (chair)
- Model 3107 chair
- Tongue chair
