= Model 3107 chair =

Chair designed by Arne Jacobsen

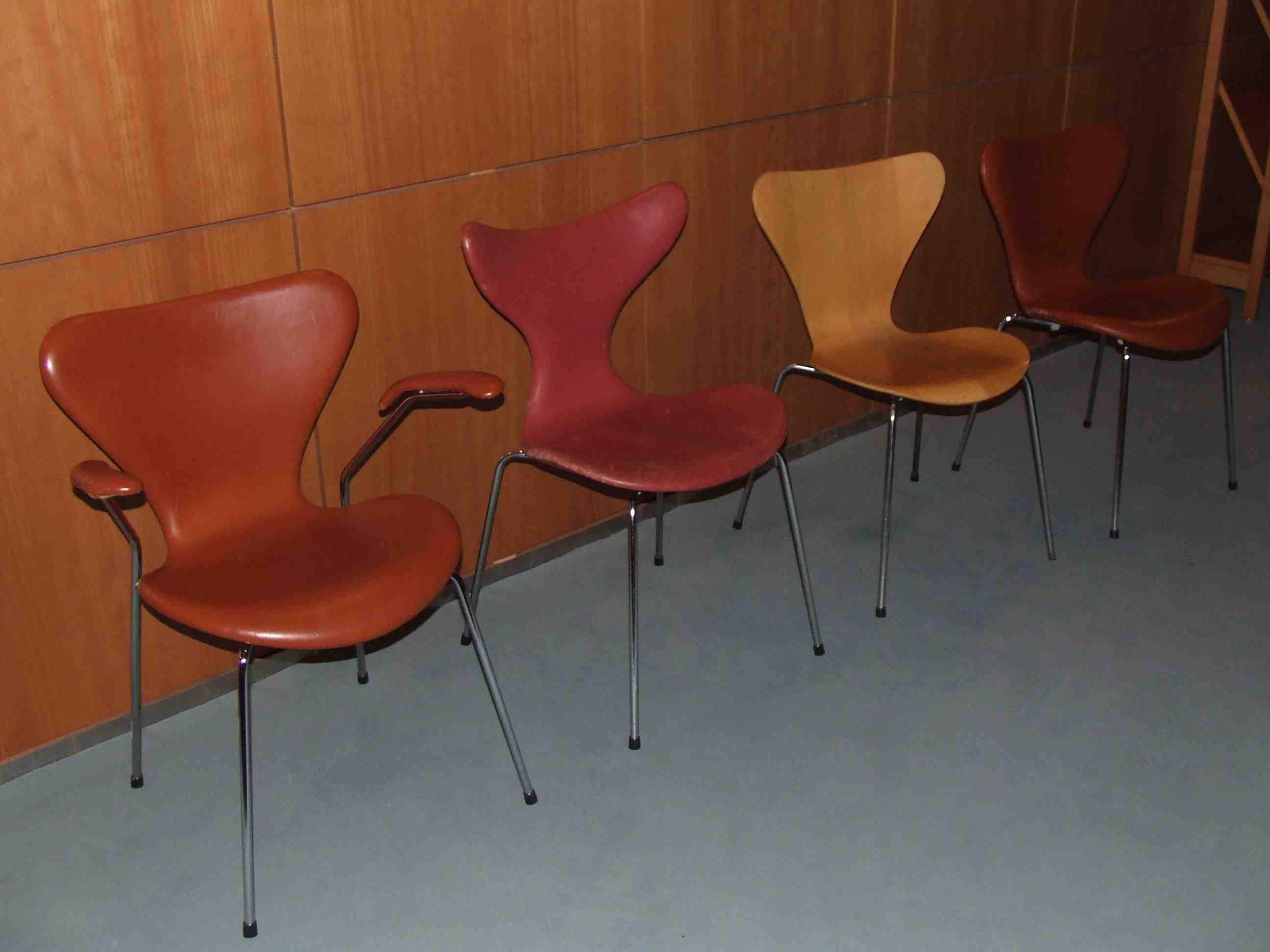
- Models 3207, 3108, and 3107 in the City Hall Mainz, Germany
- Designer: Arne Jacobsen
- Date: 1955
- Materials: Steel frame, fabric cover
- Style / tradition: Modernist
- Sold by: Fritz Hansen (Denmark)

The Model 3107 chair is a chair designed by Arne Jacobsen in 1955. It is a variation on the Ant Chair, also designed by Arne Jacobsen. Over five million units have been produced exclusively by Fritz Hansen.

== Description ==
The chair, along with the Jacobsen's Ant chair, was, according to Jacobsen, inspired by a chair made by the husband and wife design team of Charles and Ray Eames using their plywood bending techniques.

The chair is available with several different undercarriages—as a regular four-legged chair, an office chair with five wheels, and as a bar stool. It can come equipped with armrests, a writing table attachment, and various forms of upholstery.

The chair is widely believed to have been used in Lewis Morley's iconic 1963 photograph of Christine Keeler; however, the chair used in this photograph was an imitation, and not an original Jacobsen model. The Keeler chair had a handhold cut in the back. After the publication of the pictures, sales of the chair rose dramatically.

Other images

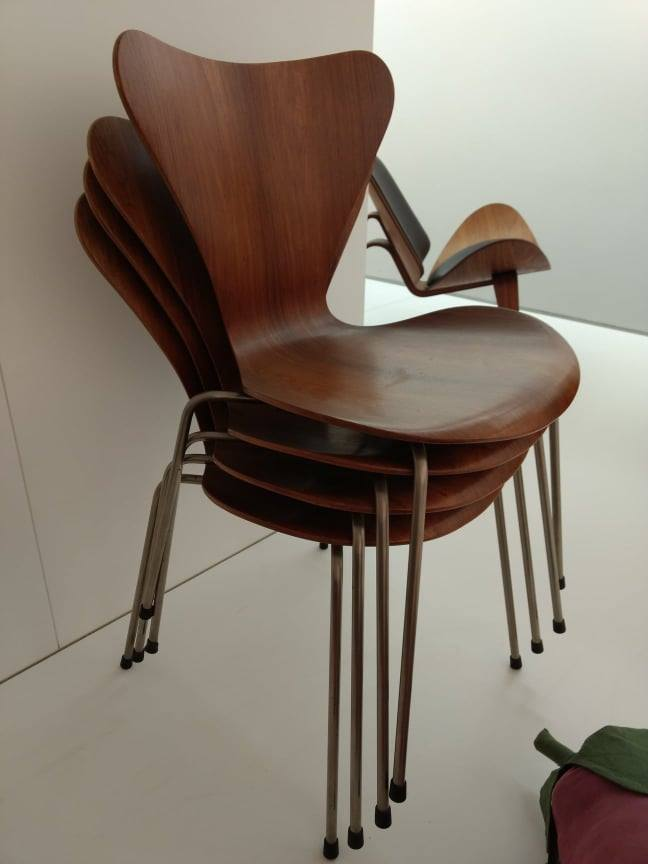
The chairs are easy to stack. (Pinakothek der Moderne, Munich)

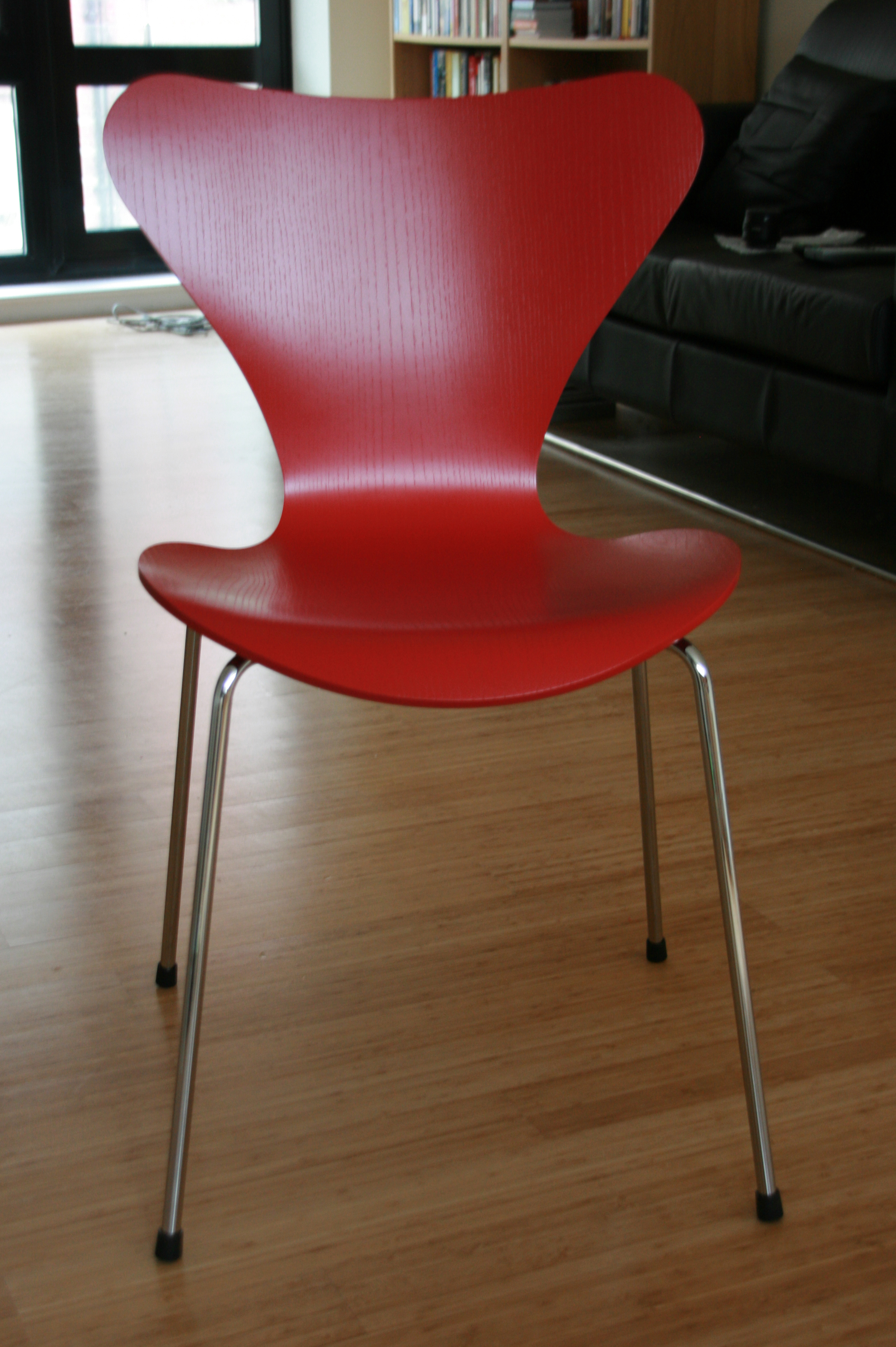
A more recent chair, red painted ash colour

== See also ==
- Bentwood
- Molded plywood
- Swan (chair)
- List of chairs
