= Louise Campbell =

Louise Campbell may refer to:

- Louise Campbell (designer) (born 1970), Danish furniture and lighting designer
- Louise Campbell (actress) (1911–1997), American actress
- Louise Campbell, Duchess of Argyll (1904–1970)

== See also ==
- Louis Campbell (born 1979), American basketball player
