= Grand Prix (chair) =

Danish modern chair by Arne Jacobsen

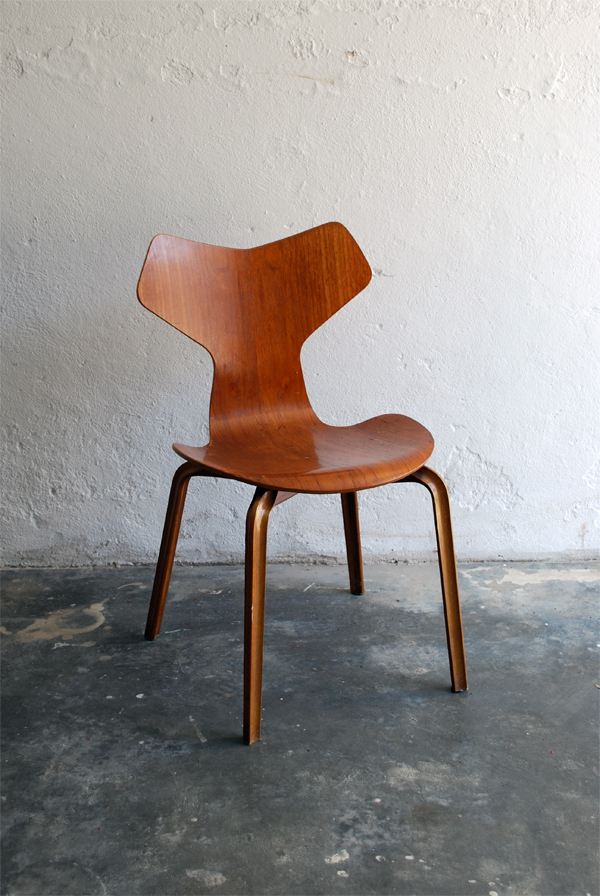
- Grand Prix chair with the original wooden legs
- Designer: Arne Jacobsen
- Date: 1957
- Materials: Plywood
- Style / tradition: Modernist
- Sold by: Fritz Hansen (Denmark)
- Height: 78 cm (31 in)
- Width: 50 cm (20 in)
- Depth: 52 cm (20 in)

The Grand Prix is a stackable plywood chair, designed by the Danish architect and designer Arne Jacobsen in 1957. It was presented at the Spring Exhibition of Danish arts and crafts at the Danish Museum of Art & Design in Copenhagen.

Originally known as the Model 4130, the chair was renamed after it won the Grand Prix at the XI. Triennale di Milano in 1957. Its construction and design mostly resembles the Model 3107, which Jacobsen designed in 1955, but featured four wooden legs. The chair is produced by Fritz Hansen out of beech or teak. The wooden legs were later replaced by the metal undercarriage used on the 3107s, with which it also shares the shape of the lower half of the shell.

The surface of the shell is then varnished, painted or finished with cloth or leather. The stool is 50 cm wide, 52 cm deep and with a seat height of 44 cm in total 78 cm high.
