= Cane-line =

Danish furniture company

- Founded: 1987; 39 years ago in Odense, Denmark
- Founder: Knud Andreasen
- Headquarters: Skovhuse, Rynkeby, Denmark
- Products: Furniture, accessories for outdoor and indoor spaces
- Owner: Brian Djernes
- Number of employees: 90 in HQ in Denmark together with Sika Design (sister company)
- Website: cane-line-com

Cane-line is a Danish furniture company based in Rynkeby (Odense), Denmark. It is a producer and manufacturer of indoor and outdoor furniture and accessories

== History ==
Cane-line A/S was founded in 1987. The company sold indoor furniture to furniture chains in Scandinavia, expanding its range to include outdoor furniture in 1997.

Brian Djernes became the CEO of Cane-line in 1997. The company was based in Odense until 2003, but have since moved the head office to Skovhuse, Rynkeby.

Cane-line is an international design company with 90 employees. Cane-line Australia was founded in 2011 and Cane-line USA in 2017.

== Production ==
Cane-line designs furniture in the Nordic style of Scandinavia. It has production sites in Indonesia and Lithuania. The company also has a sales subsidiary with a warehouses in Melbourne, Australia, and in New York, USA.

== Collaborations ==
The Cane-line designers and the external designers all share roots in the Danish design tradition.

Some of Cane-line's design collaborations include:

- Foersom & Hiort-Lorenzen MDD
- Strand+Hvass
- Welling/Ludvik
- byKATO
- Søren Rose Studios
- Maria Berntsen

== Design awards ==
- Outdoor Sense 3-seater sofa, designed in 2022 by Foersom & Hiort-Lorenzen MDD, Bolig Magasinets design favorites 2022 - winner
- Basket collection, designed in 2021 by Søren Rose Studio, Bolig Magasinets design favorites 2021 - winner, German Design award 2022 – special mention
- Loop (Black Nest), displayed on Snedkernes Efterårsudstilling 2016
- Amaze 2-seater sofa, designed in 2014 by Foersom & Hiort-Lorenzen MDD, Interior Innovation Award 2015 – winner, German Design Award 2016 – special mention
- Conic modular sofa system, designed in 2012 by Foersom & Hiort-Lorenzen MDD, Interior Innovation Award 2013 – winner
- Nest coffee table/footstool, displayed on Snedkernes Efterårsudstilling 2009

== Company awards ==
- EY Entrepreneur of the Year 2021 – Winner of Denmark
- Succesvirksomhed 2021
- EY Entrepreneur of the Year, Fyn region 2019+ 2021
- PWC, Årets Ejerleder Fyn/Owner CEO of the Year, Region Winner, 2015 + 2019
- Tietgenprisen 2018

== See also ==
- Danish design
- List of Danish furniture designers
