= Fritz Hansen (company) =

Danish furniture design company

Republic of Fritz Hansen
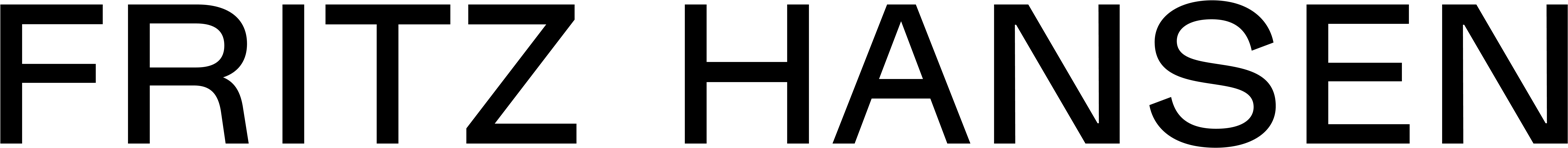
- Company type: Privately held
- Industry: Furniture
- Founded: 1872
- Founder: Fritz Hansen
- Headquarters: Allerødvej 8, 3450 Allerød, Denmark
- Number of locations: Worldwide showrooms
- Area served: Worldwide
- Products: Luxury furniture
- Number of employees: 310
- Website: www.fritzhansen.com

Fritz Hansen, also known as Republic of Fritz Hansen, is a Danish furniture design company. Designers who have worked for Fritz Hansen include Arne Jacobsen (1902–1971), Poul Kjærholm (1929–1980), Hans J. Wegner (1914–2007) and Piet Hein (1905–1996). Fritz Hansen also collaborates with contemporary furniture architects including Benjamin Hubert, Hiromichi Konno, Cecilie Manz, and Kasper Salto.

== History ==
Fritz Hansen was founded in 1872, when Fritz Hansen, a Danish carpenter, founded his own furniture company and in 1915 introduced his first chair in steam bent wood. In 1934, Fritz Hansen began his collaboration with Arne Jacobsen resulting in some of the famous, classic icons of Danish Design including the 'Ant' (1952), the 'Series 7' (1955), the 'Grand Prix' (1957) the 'Swan' (1958), and the 'Egg' (1958). Other famous collaborations have resulted in Piet Hein's super-elliptical table from 1968 and in 1982 Fritz Hansen acquired the rights to a major part of Poul Kjærholm's furniture collection. Since the 1980s continuing into the new millennium, Fritz Hansen has added new designs to the collection including the Essay table by Cecilie Manz, T-NO1 by Todd Bracher, RIN chair by Hiromichi Konno, Plano tables by Pelikan Design and the Ice series by Kasper Salto.

== Design Icons ==
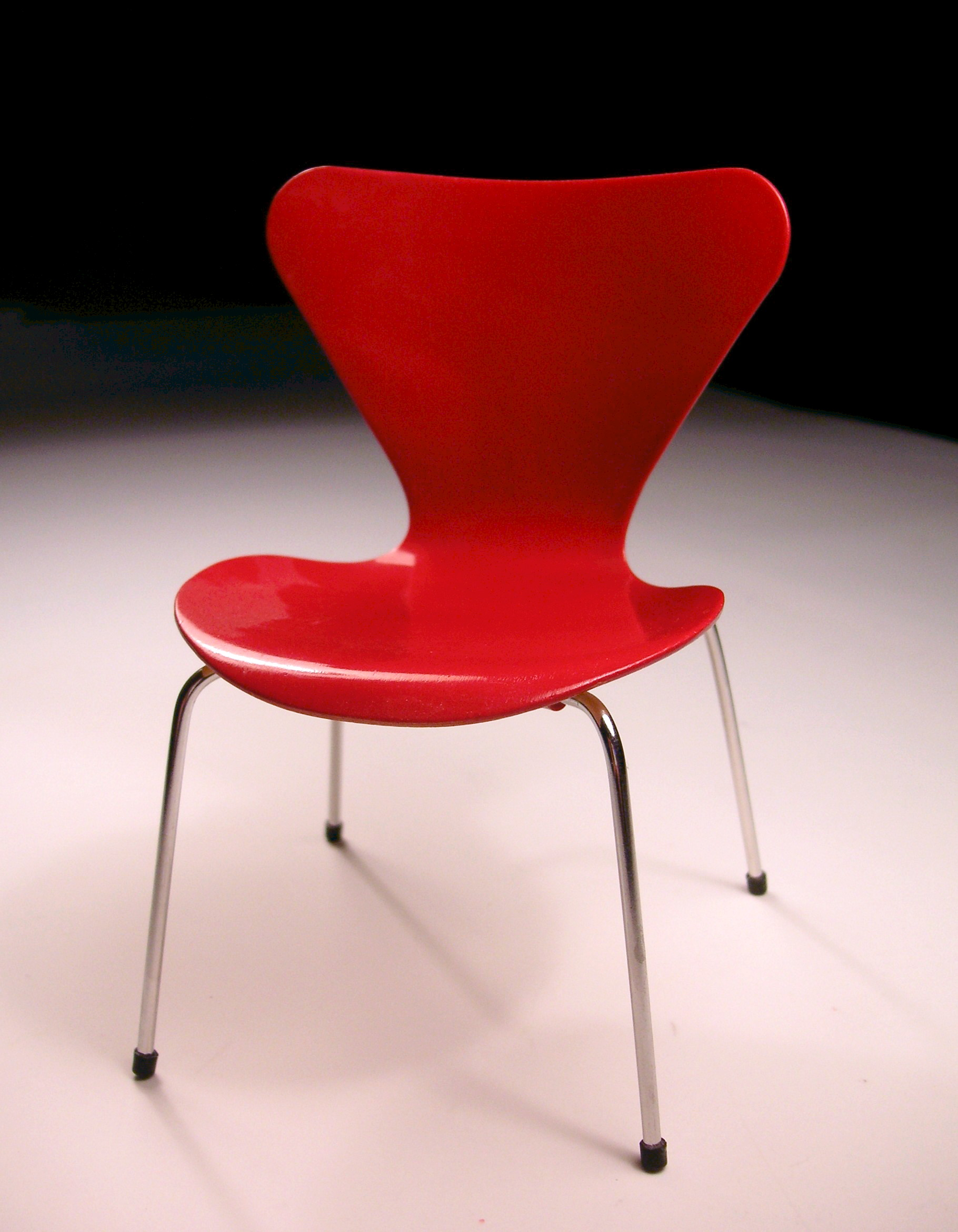
The 7 Chair (1955) by Arne Jacobsen

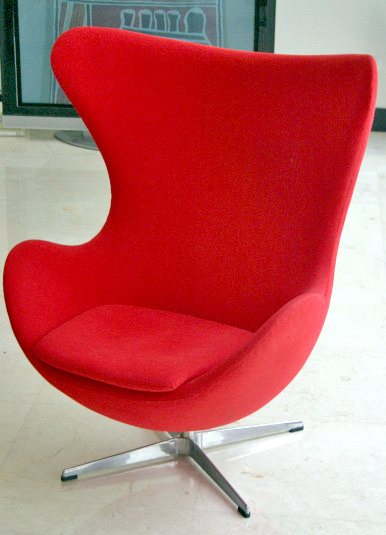
Egg chair (1958) by Arne Jacobsen

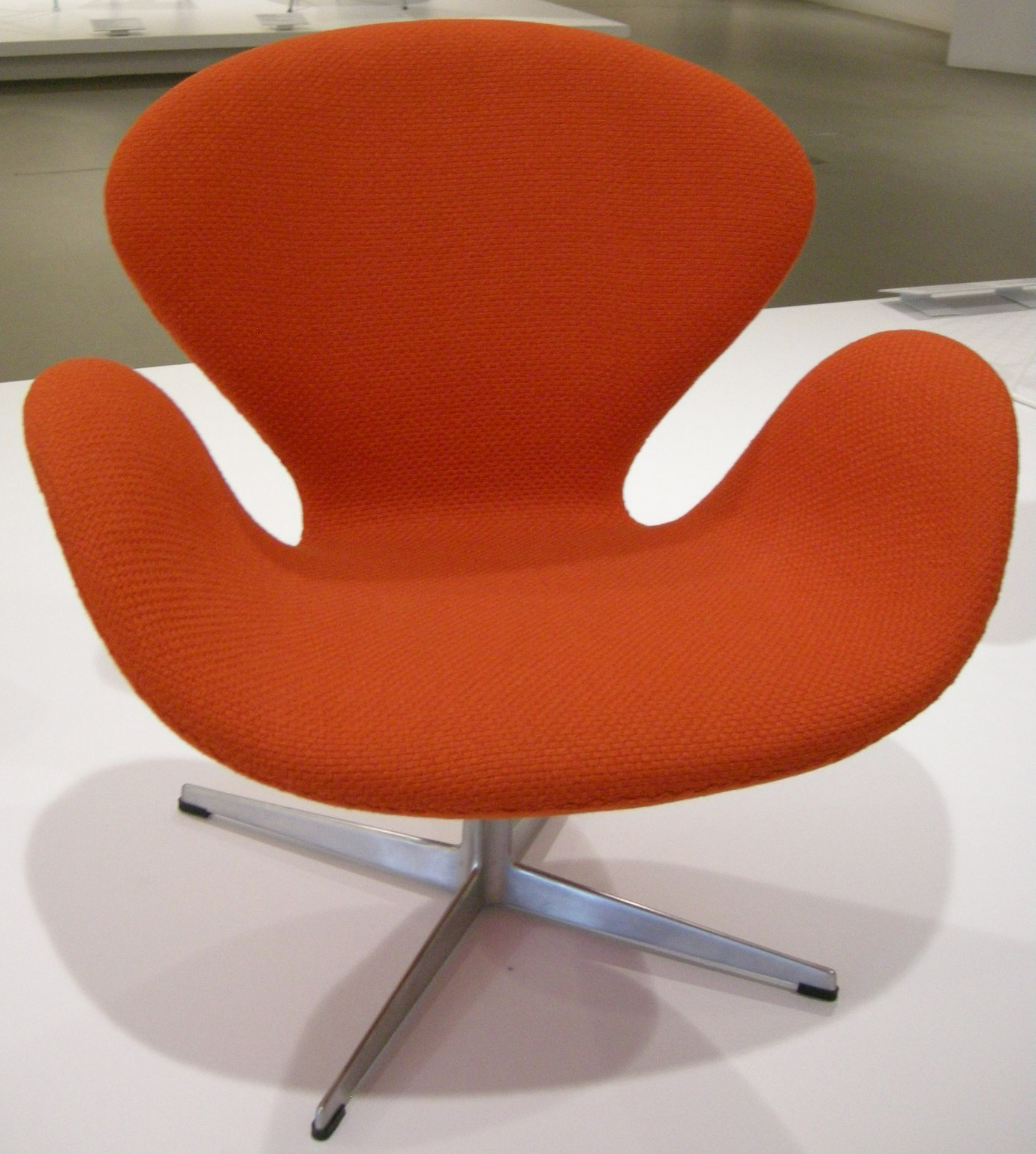
Swan (chair) (1958) by Arne Jacobsen

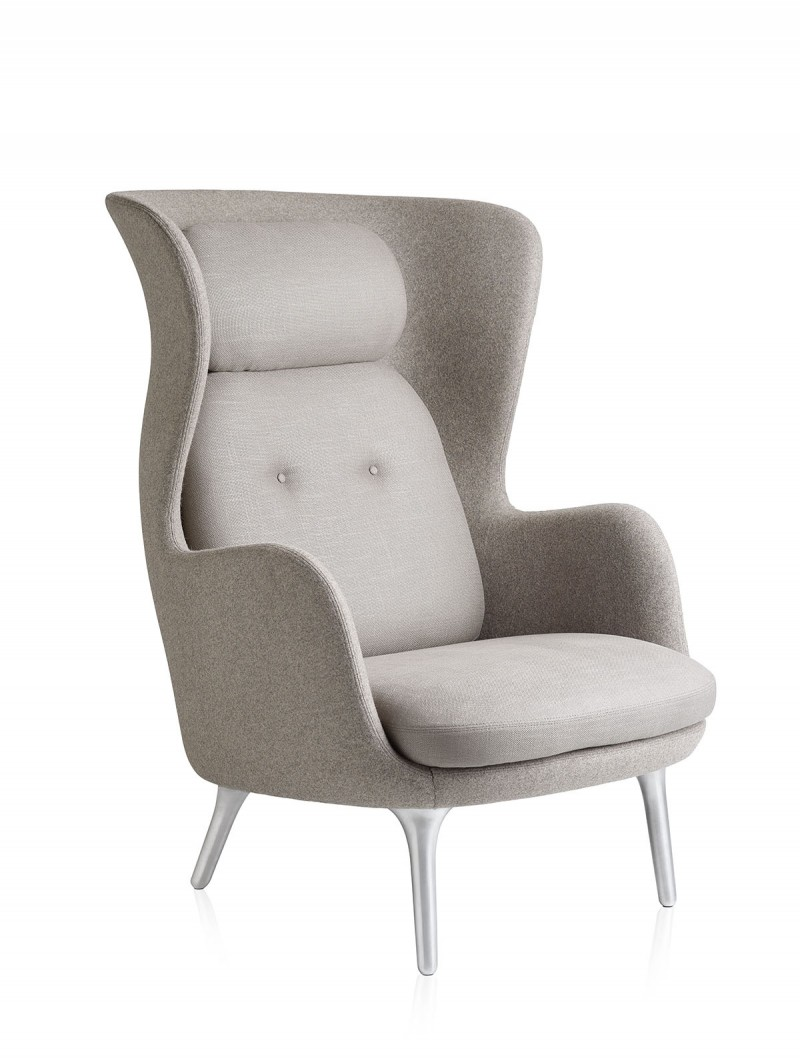
The Ro Chair (2013) by Jaime Hayon

== Designers ==
Fritz Hansen manufactures the works of designers such as Arne Jacobsen, Poul Kjærholm, Cecilie Manz, Hiromichi Konno, Piero Lissoni, Morten Voss, Bruno Mathsson, Todd Bracher, Hans J. Wegner, Hans S. Jakobsen, Kasper Salto, Pelikan Design, Jehs+Laub and Piet Hein.

== Style ==
Products made by Fritz Hansen usually display characteristic Scandinavian designs where functionality predominates esthetics. Hence, Fritz Hansen's creations mainly show minimalistic designs, with refined lines and recurring use of wood.

== See also ==
- Danish modern
