= Architecture of Copenhagen =

Architecture of the capital of Denmark

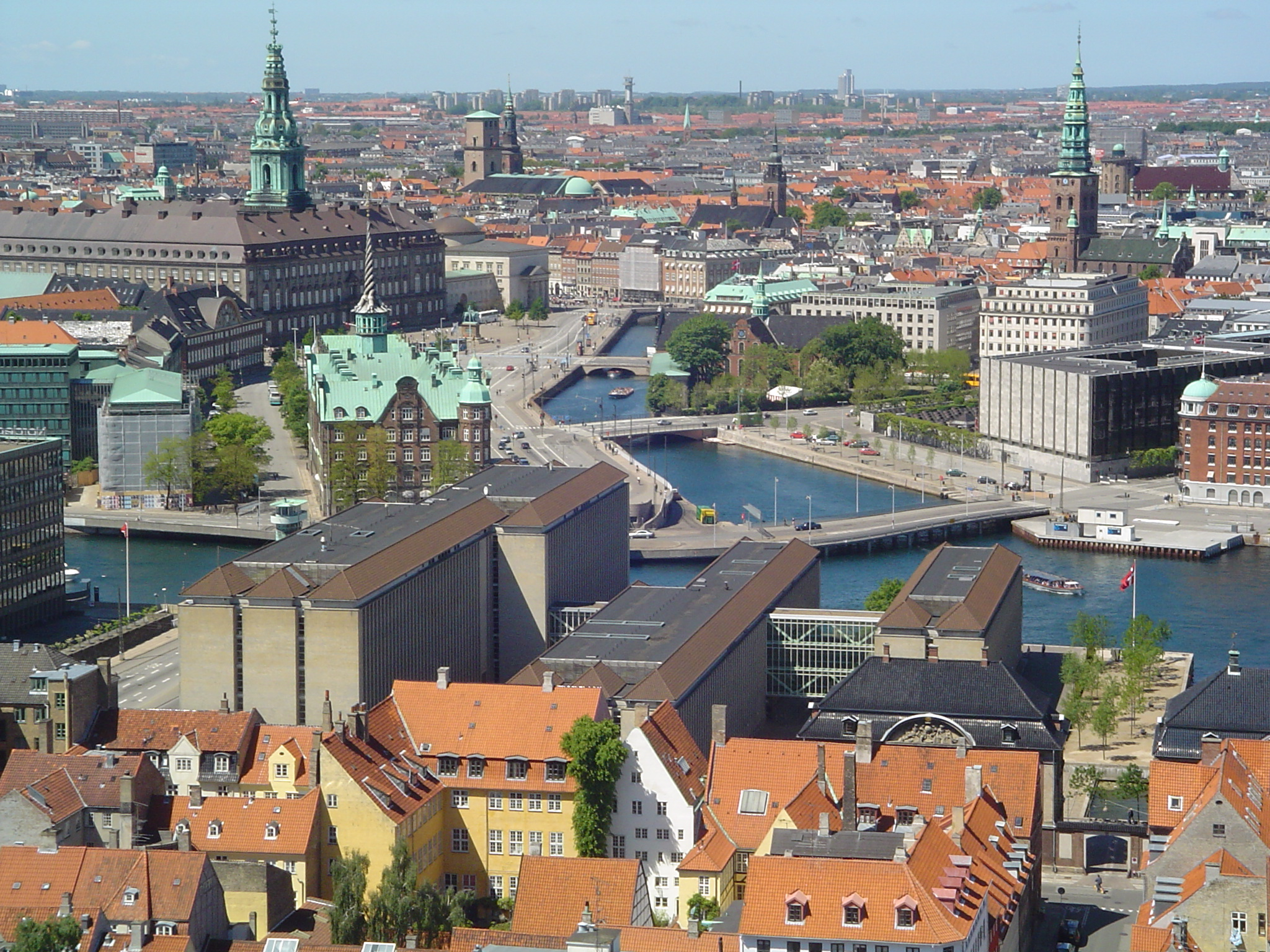
View of Copenhagen from the tower of the Church of Our Saviour

The architecture of Copenhagen in Denmark is characterised by a wide variety of styles, progressing through Christian IV's early 17th century landmarks and the elegant 17th century mansions and palaces of Frederiksstaden, to the late 19th century residential boroughs and cultural institutions to the modernistic contribution of the 20th century such as Arne Jacobsen's National Bank and SAS Royal Hotel.

Copenhagen is recognised globally as an exemplar of best practice urban planning. Its thriving mixed use city centre is defined by striking contemporary architecture, engaging public spaces and an abundance of human activity. These design outcomes have been deliberately achieved through careful replanning in the second half of the 20th century, with notable contributions both by leading international architects and a wave of new successful Danish architects.

== Medieval times ==
The oldest preserved building in Copenhagen's inner city is considered to be Helligåndshuset. Helligåndshuset is built in the late 13th century.

== Renaissance ==
Over the centuries Copenhagen grew in importance and a number of important landmarks of present-day Copenhagen date back to the late 16th and early 17th centuries. This can also be attributed to the personal effort of Christian IV, who is popularly known as "the builder king" in Denmark because of his legacy of and involvement in large building projects. Rosenborg Castle and the old Stock Exchange in central Copenhagen, as well as Frederiksborg Palace in Hillerød are all built in the Dutch Renaissance style, sometimes referred to in Denmark as "Christian IV style". Christian IV also founded the neighbourhoods of Christianshavn, of Nyboder as well as such important green spaces as King's Garden and Kastellet.

== Baroque ==
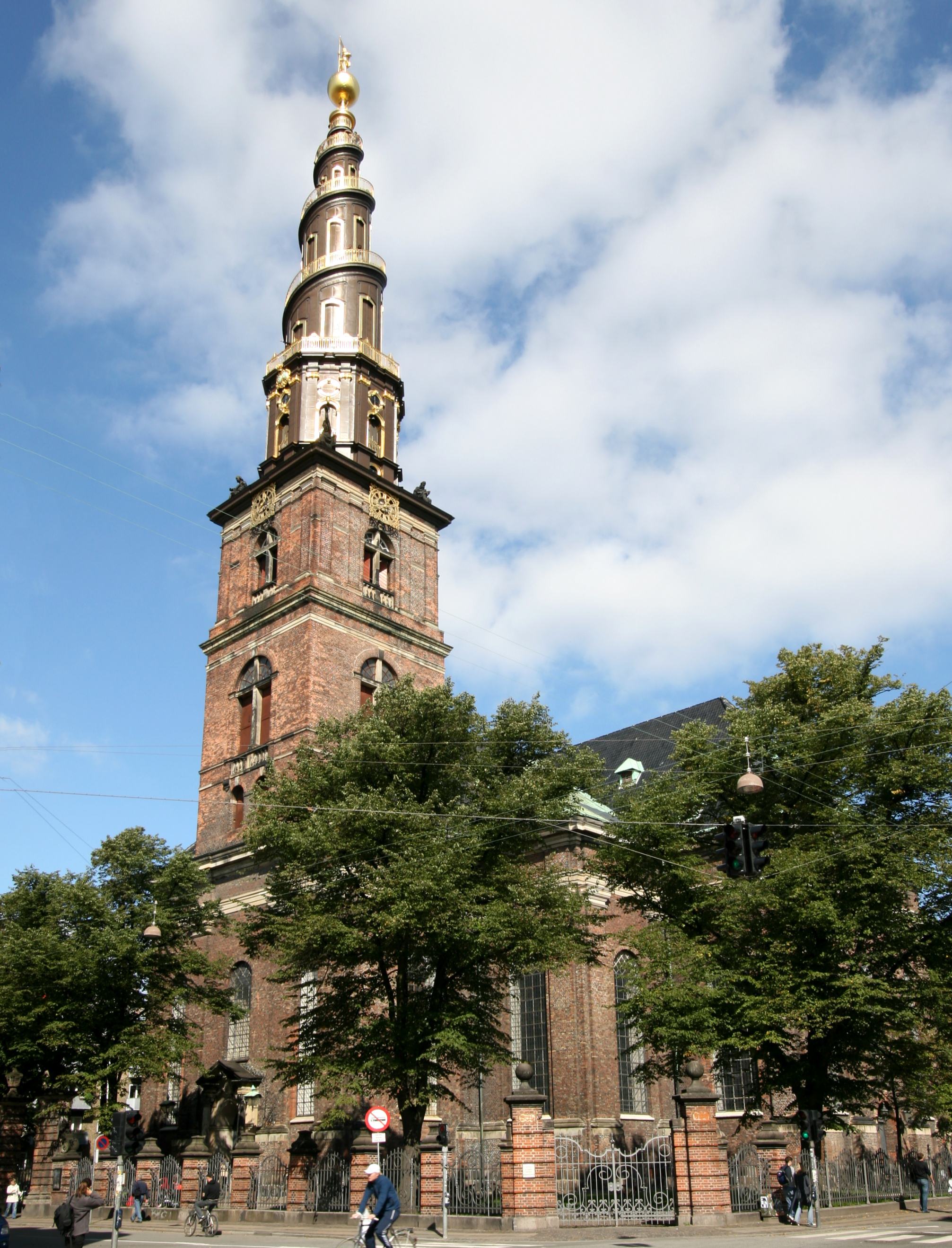
Church of Our Saviour

Baroque buildings in Copenhagen include the Round Tower and the Church of Our Saviour as well as Fredensborg Palace.

== Rococo ==
Frederiksstaden was constructed during the reign of Frederick V in the second half of the 18th century and is considered to be one of the most important Rococo complexes in Europe. It was developed to commemorated the 300 years jubilee of the House of Oldenburg taking the throne in Denmark. Leading the project was A. G. Moltke, with Nicolai Eigtved as the main architect. Frederiksstaden has Amalienborg Palace and Marble Church at its centre and together they create an axis that was extended with the creation of the new Copenhagen Opera House in 2005 on the other side of the harbour basin. The district is characterized by straight broad streets in a straight-angled street layout. The streets are lined by bourgeois houses, mansions and palaces. Another important building in the district is the royal Frederiks Hospital was Denmark's first hospital in the present-day meaning of the word. It now houses the Danish Museum of Art & Design.

== 21st century: modernist architecture and urban development ==
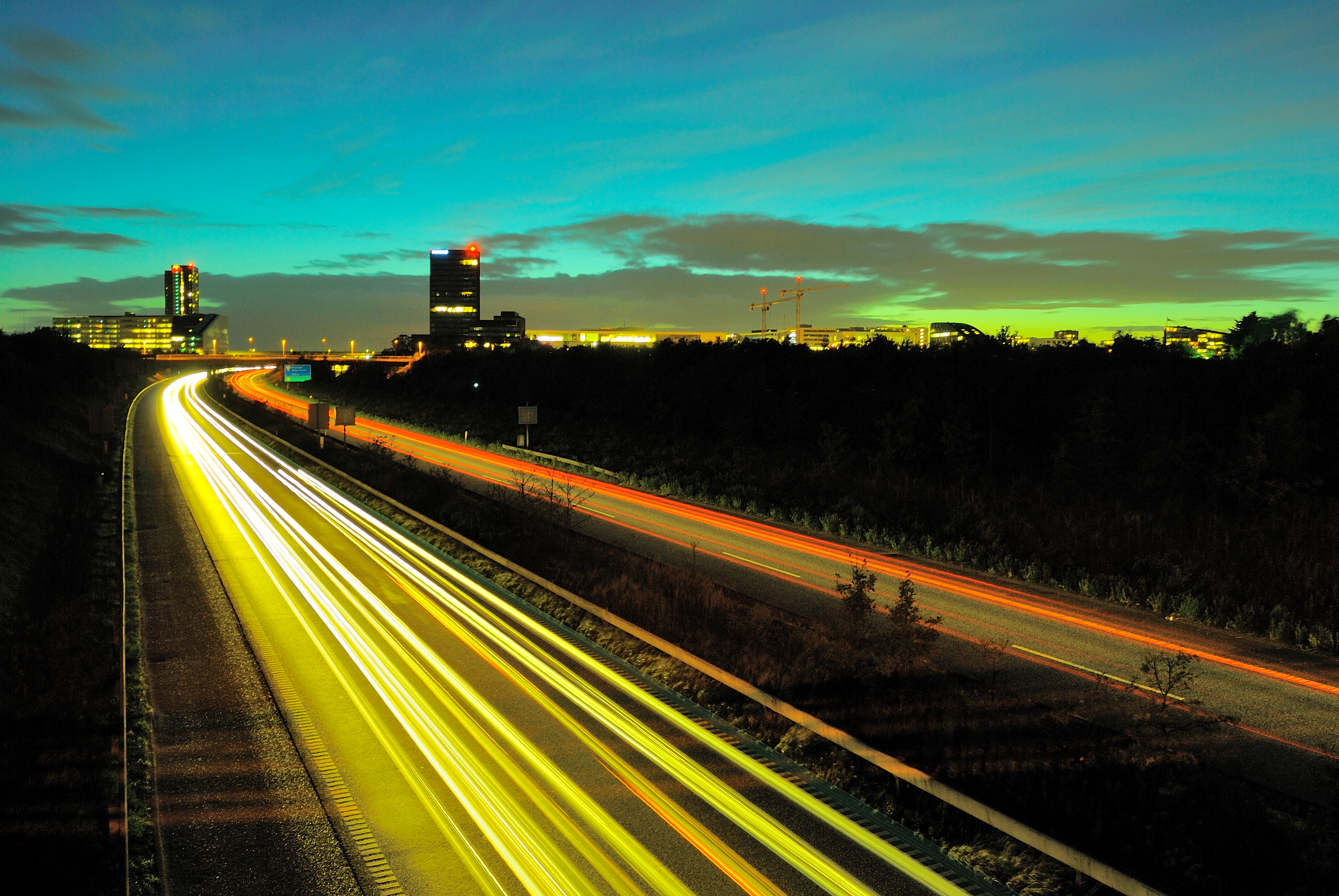
The developing skyline of Ørestad, located in the outskirts of Copenhagen.

Recent years have seen a boom in modern architecture in Copenhagen both for Danish architecture and for works by international architects. For a few hundred years, virtually no foreign architects had worked in Copenhagen, but since the turn of the millennium the city and its immediate surroundings have seen buildings and projects designed by top international architects. At the same time, a number of Danish architects have achieved success in Copenhagen and abroad.

Copenhagen's urban development in the first half of the 20th century was heavily influenced by industrialisation. After World War II, Copenhagen Municipality adopted Fordism and repurposed its medieval centre to facilitate private automobile infrastructure in response to innovations in transport, trade and communication. Copenhagen’s spatial planning in this time frame was characterised by the separation of land uses: an approach which requires residents to travel by car to access facilities of different uses. This planning scheme largely aligned with the modernist framework endorsed by Le Corbusier in such conceptual projects as the controversial Plan Voisin for Paris.

Ebenezer Howard’s conceptualisation of the Garden City also perforated Copenhagen’s masterplan prior to the 1960s. In 1949, Copenhagen Municipality implemented the Finger Plan: a policy stating that the city should develop urban clusters along its five outreaching rapid public transport arteries. This early example of transit orientated development resonates with Howard’s ideal of developing periphery communities linked with productive urban centres. Due to the significant replanning that commenced in 1962, Copenhagen was fortunate to benefit from the intensification of its rapid transit corridors without suffering from the undesirable urban forms associated with British iterations of the Garden City.

In 1962, Danish architect Jan Gehl shifted the trajectory of Copenhagen’s development by pedestrianising key parts of its city centre with the goal of enhancing the on-street conditions for humans. Rigorous field studies informed Gehl’s conclusion that city spaces perform best when they encourage the use of public spaces. Gehl observed that the quality of life between buildings is diminished when substandard architecture, poor safety and overwhelming car infrastructure limit human engagement in public places. Gehl therefore commenced the replanning of Copenhagen in 1962 by pedestrianising Strøget: the city’s main interior transit artery.

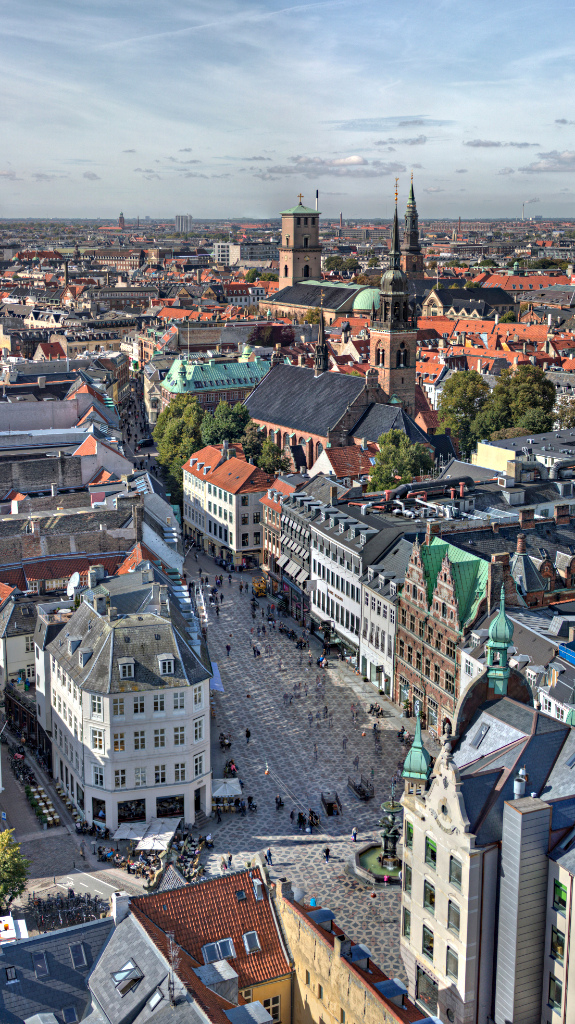
Aerial view of Amagertorv square in the Strøget pedestrianised zone

Strøget is today the defining thread of Copenhagen’s urban fabric. In the first year of replanning the number of pedestrians accessing Strøget increased by 35% and the number of baby carriages observed in the street increased by 400%. In the forty years since the project’s commencement Gehl has overseen the conversion of 100 000 square metres of private vehicle space into pedestrian space with fine stone street surfacing, improved ambient street lighting and architecturally designed public furniture. Beyond the streetscape, the urban form is now defined by low rise, mixed use developments that thrive upon the increased pedestrian access.

Gehl’s work in redefining Copenhagen’s urban form is today praised as true innovation, however the redevelopment was informed by several historical planning approaches. Most notably, Gehl drew significant inspiration from the urban forms that featured prominently in Southern European cities prior to the 16th century. These urban environments were woven with intricate street systems where irregular layouts, tights corners and narrow laneways produced engaging pedestrian experiences. Gehl’s desire to implement aesthetically engaging streetscapes in Copenhagen also resonated with the work of Pullman and Lever in Port Sunlight.

Built as a worker’s town, Port Sunlight represented a landmark shift towards an urban planning approach that employed landscape architecture to deliver urban environments of high aesthetic value. Pullman and Lever, and indeed Gehl, intended to enhance public life through design: a key tenet of Jane Jacobs’ seminal urban planning discourse. Jacobs described an ideal human-scale city as having “an intricate and close-grained diversity of uses that give each other constant mutual support, both economically and socially”. The pedestrianisation of Stroget can therefore be understood as an attempt to implement the planning approaches of Jacobs, Pullman and Lever in an engaging urban environment possessing the walkability of a medieval Southern European city.

Buildings in Copenhagen have won RIBA European Awards four years in a row ("Sampension" in 2005, "Kilen" in 2006, "Tietgenkollegiet" in 2007 and the Royal Playhouse in 2008.) The last three are all by Lundgaard & Tranberg Architects. At the 2008 World Architecture Festival in Barcelona, Bjarke Ingels Group won an award for the World's Best Residential Building 2008 for a house in Ørestad. In 2008 British design magazine Monocle named Copenhagen the World's best design city 2008. In 2017 CNN listed The Silo, designed by Danish architect Dan Stubbergaard and his team at Cobe, as one of the most anticipated buildings completing in 2018

== See also ==
- Architecture of Denmark
