= Finn Juhl Prize =

- Description: Honoring outstanding contributions to furniture design, particularly chairs
- Country: Denmark
- Presented by: Wilhelm Hansen Foundation
- Reward: DKK 175,000

The Finn Juhl Prize is a design prize awarded annually by the Wilhelm Hansen Foundation to a recipient who has made a special effort in the field of furniture design–with special reference to chairs—such as an architect, manufacturer, writer. Founded in 2003, its name commemorates the Danish architect and furniture designer Finn Juhl. The recipient receives DKK 175,000 (approximately $ 33,000) and the award ceremony takes place at the Ordrupgaard Art Museum north of Copenhagen, Denmark.

== Recipients ==
Year	Keeper
2003	Maya Lin
2004	Louise Campbell
2005	Foersom and Hiort-Lorenzen
2006	PP Møbler
2007	Cecilie Manz
2008	Ronan & Erwan Bouroullec
2009	Hans Sandgren Jakobsen
2010	Kasper Salto
2011	Ditte Hammerstrøm
2012	Mathias Bengtsson
2013	Department of Carpentry, Copenhagen Technical School
2014	Maria Wettergren

== See also ==
- Bo Bedre Awards
- Danish modern
