= Radisson Collection Royal Hotel, Copenhagen =

Hotel in Copenhagen

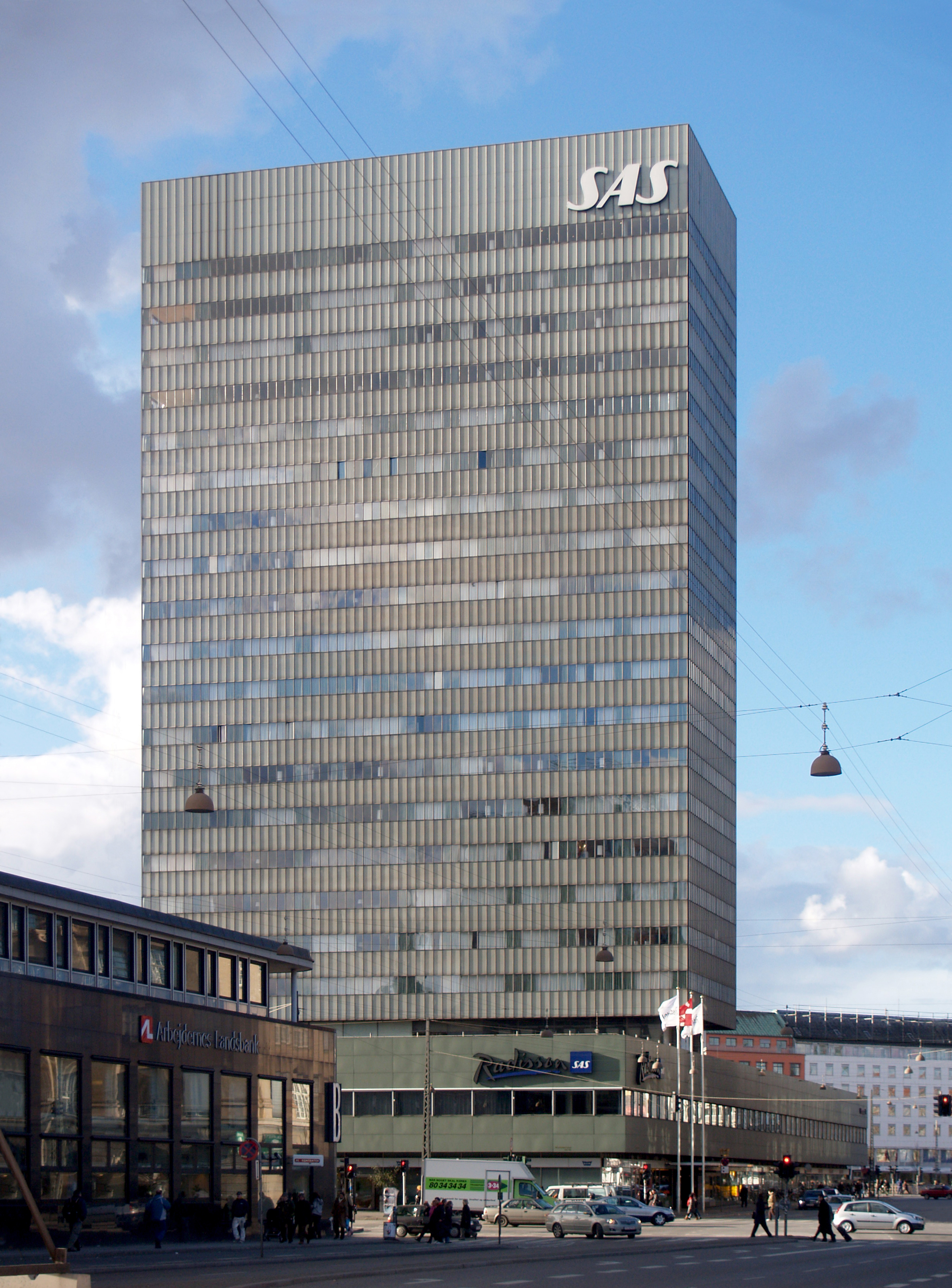
- Radisson Collection Royal Hotel, Copenhagen
- Interactive map of the Radisson Collection Royal Hotel, Copenhagen area

General information
- Location: Hammerichsgade 1, Copenhagen, Denmark
- Coordinates: 55°40′30″N 12°33′47″E
- Opening: 1 July 1960; 66 years ago
- Operator: Radisson Hospitality AB (part of Radisson Hotel Group)

Height
- Height: 69.6

Design and construction
- Architect: Arne Jacobsen

Website
- Official hotel website

The Radisson Collection Royal Hotel, Copenhagen is a historic hotel in Copenhagen, Denmark.

== History ==
The hotel was designed by Danish architect and designer Arne Jacobsen for the airline Scandinavian Airlines System (SAS). It was opened on July 1, 1960, by King Frederik IX and Queen Ingrid as the Royal Hotel. It was also known as the SAS Royal Hotel. The hotel was renamed the Radisson SAS Royal Hotel in 1994, when SAS signed a joint marketing agreement with Radisson Hotels. When SAS and Radisson ceased the marketing agreement in February 2009, the hotel remained with Radisson and was renamed the Radisson Blu Royal Hotel. On March 6, 2018, it was renamed Radisson Collection Hotel, Royal Copenhagen. In 2019, the name was modified slightly, to Radisson Collection Royal Hotel, Copenhagen.

At its completion, the hotel was the largest in Denmark. At 69.60 meters in height, it was the first skyscraper in Copenhagen, and until 1969, the tallest high-rise building in Denmark. In 2009, it was the country's seventh-highest tower.

== Design ==
The entire hotel – from the exterior façade through to the stainless-steel cutlery used in the restaurant and the Swan and Egg chairs gracing the lobby – was designed by the Danish architect Arne Jacobsen. Since most of his work has been replaced by corporate standard fabrics and furniture, the hotel has been referred to as Jacobsens' Lost Gesamtkunstwerk. Only a single room has been kept in the original design. It has all of the original, green furniture and the wood panels on the wall. This room, with the number 606, is no longer available for booking but guests can request a tour.

Shades of green dominate the entire design. Jacobsen, who was also working as a landscape architect 1955-1960, pursued a "modern garden" theme. He implemented this theme using green textiles and furniture combined with "organic shapes" and rigid geometric forms.

Jacobsen has created several furniture, lighting and textile designs. Some models were later adopted into mass production and have become design classics, which are exhibited in museums worldwide. Others, however, remained unique pieces.

During the design phase sketches of the building were published in Danish newspapers. Critics feared a destruction of the traditional skyline of Copenhagen. The building was compared to a punch card. Jacobsen's response was, "it’s funny, for that is actually what it looks like when the windows are open on a hot summer’s day." Another term used was introduced by Jacobsen's former associate Erik Møller, who called it the "glass cigarbox". The promoter of the international style, Philip C. Johnson, said it was the worst copy of Lever House. Jacobsen responded: "At least, it came in first when they held a competition for the ugliest building in Copenhagen."

== Structure ==
Structure of the hotel: (1) tower (2) lower building (3) roof of the winter garden (4) roof of the airline terminal

The structure is twenty stories high and a defining characteristic of Copenhagen's skyline. The structure was inspired by New York Park Avenue structures, namely Skidmore, Owings & Merrill's Lever House. The building's sense of lightness emanates from its Lever House-inspired form with a two-story base supporting its lofty "punch card" tower.

The reinforced concrete frame structure erected in the tower has a curtain wall of aluminum profiles and transparent green and gray anodized glass. The windows can be opened to the inside stories in all. The horizontal distance between the aluminum profiles is 60 cm. Vertical take turns green glass followed by 168 cm 120 cm window is installed. The curtain wall construction Jacobsen at the three-story City Hall was first used in 1955 Rødovre Denmark. The hotel façade differs only from the City Hall by the light-green colour of the intermediate elements and some slightly different proportions.

== Location ==
It is located in the heart of the city, in the Vesterbro district, close to Tivoli and Copenhagen Central Station. On a road island outside the hotel is the "Freedom Statue", commemorating the abolition of serfdom in Denmark.

== Gallery ==
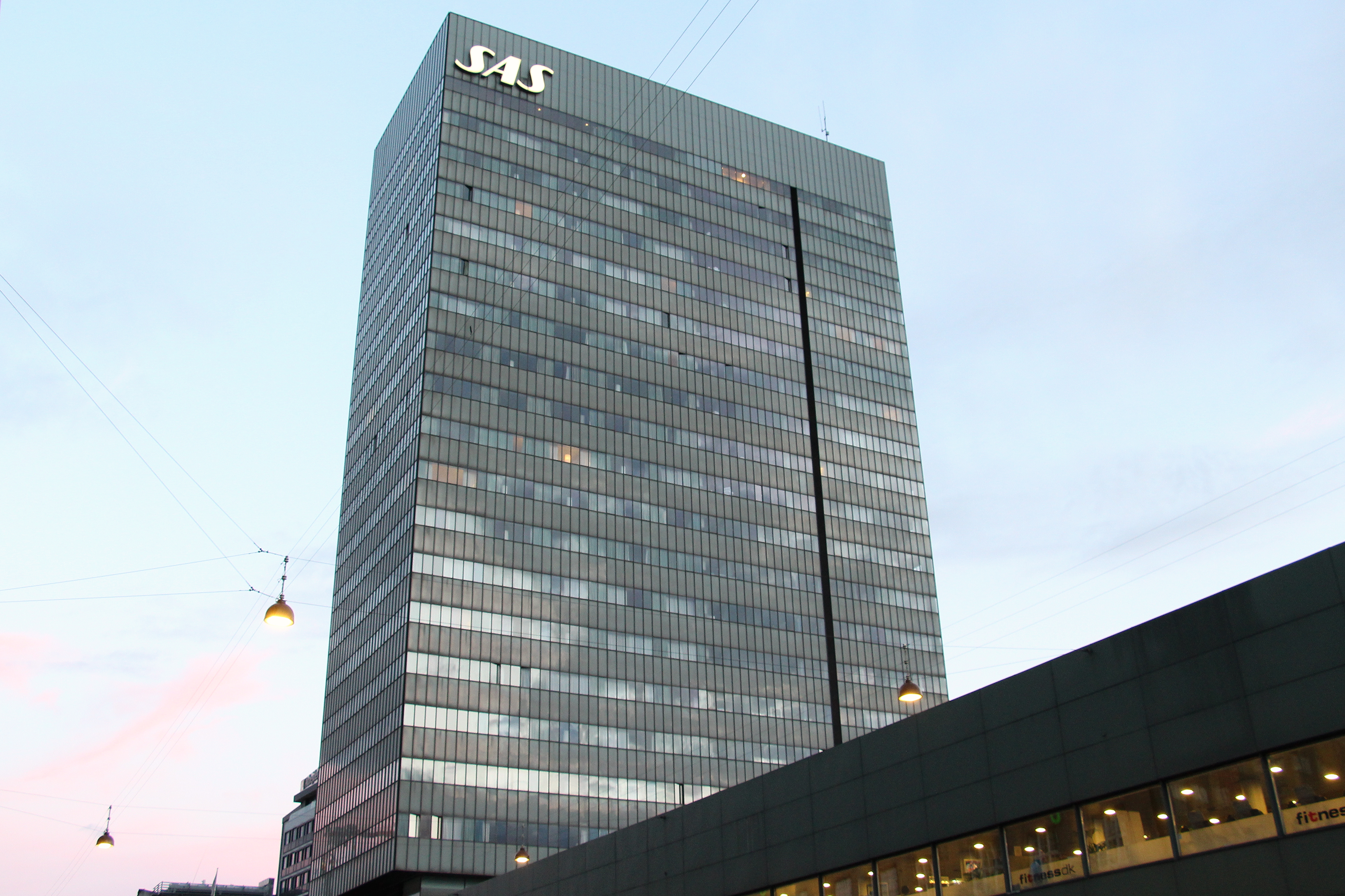
The hotel in 2016

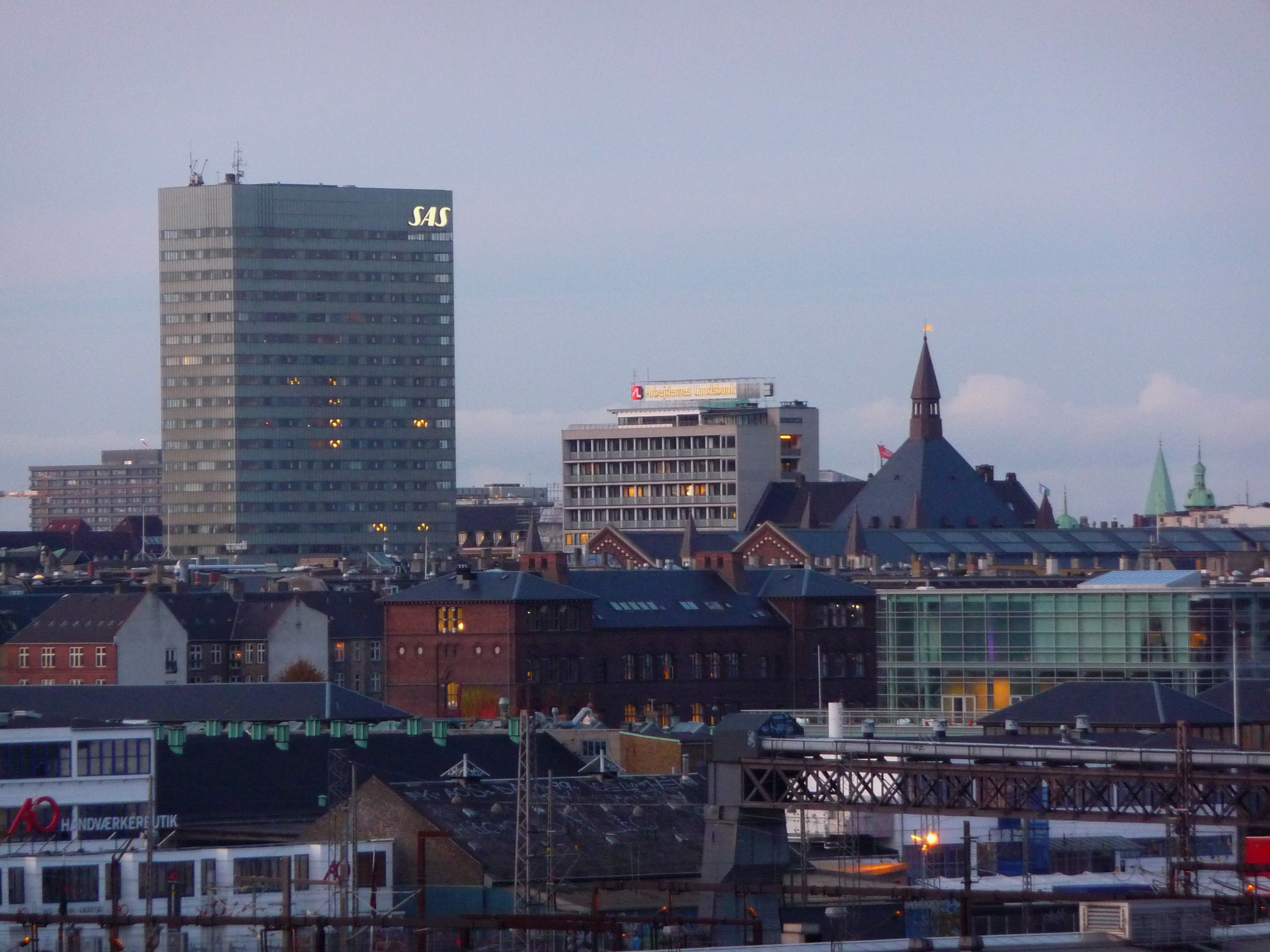
A view of the hotel on the left and to its right the Copenhagen Central Station

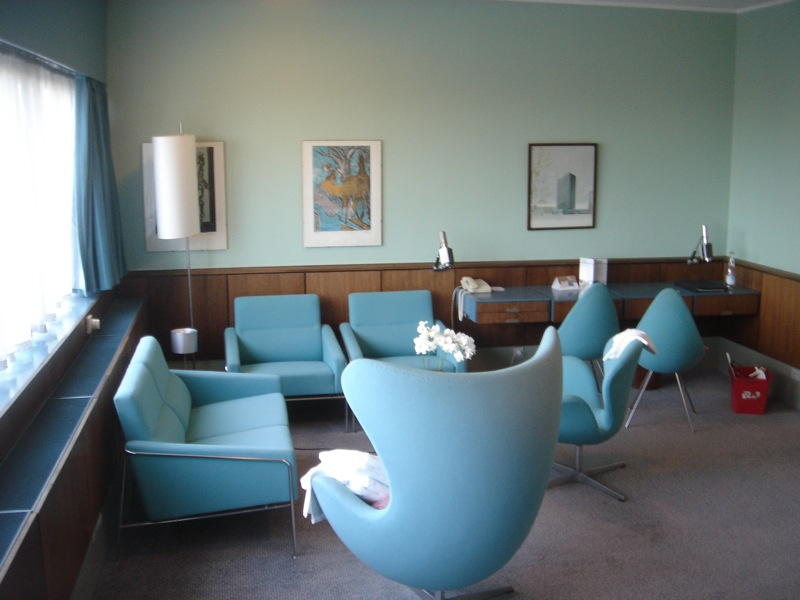
Radisson SAS Royal Hotel, Room 606, by Arne Jacobsen

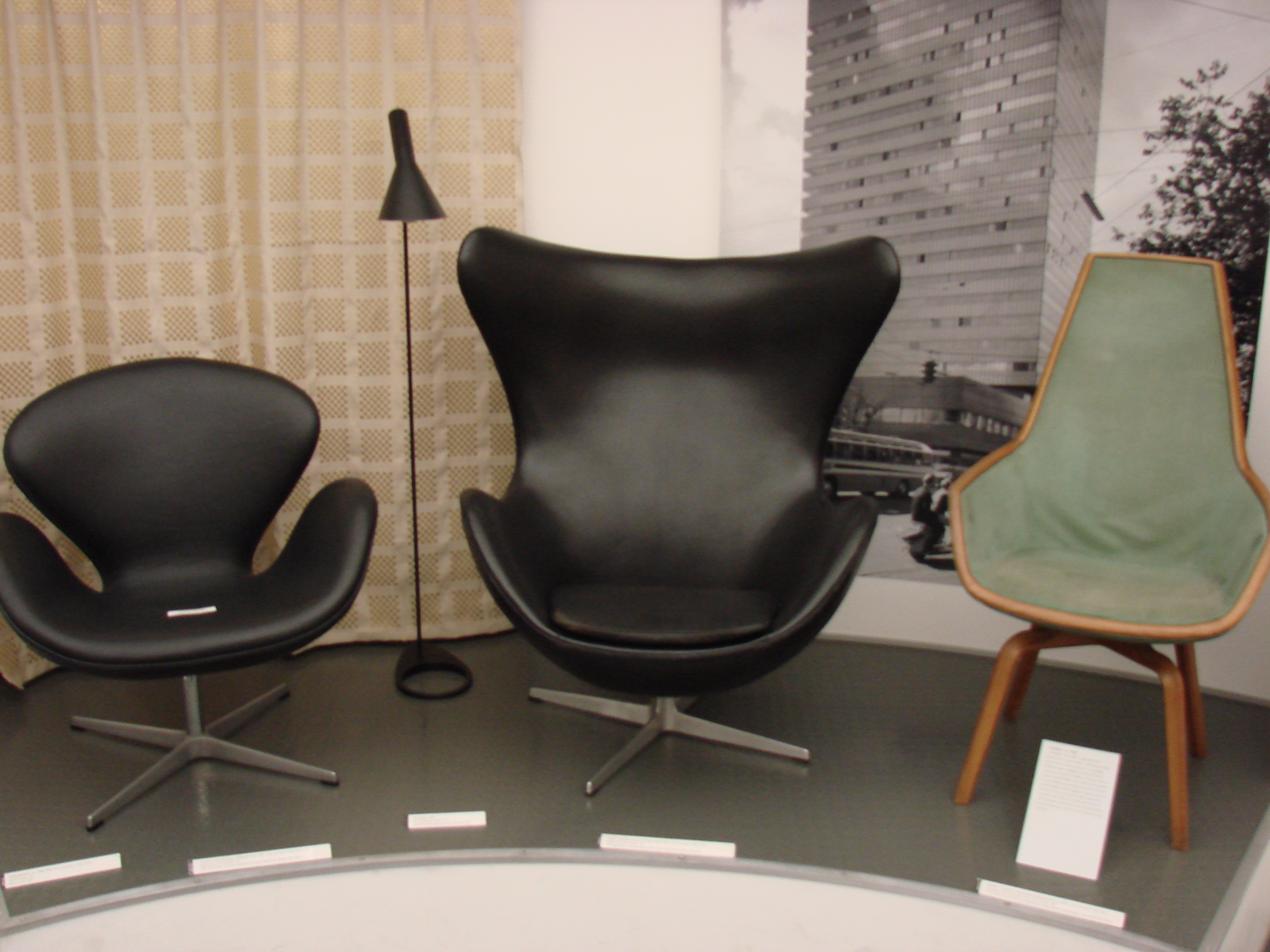
Swan and egg chairs in the lobby, in front of a picture of the hotel

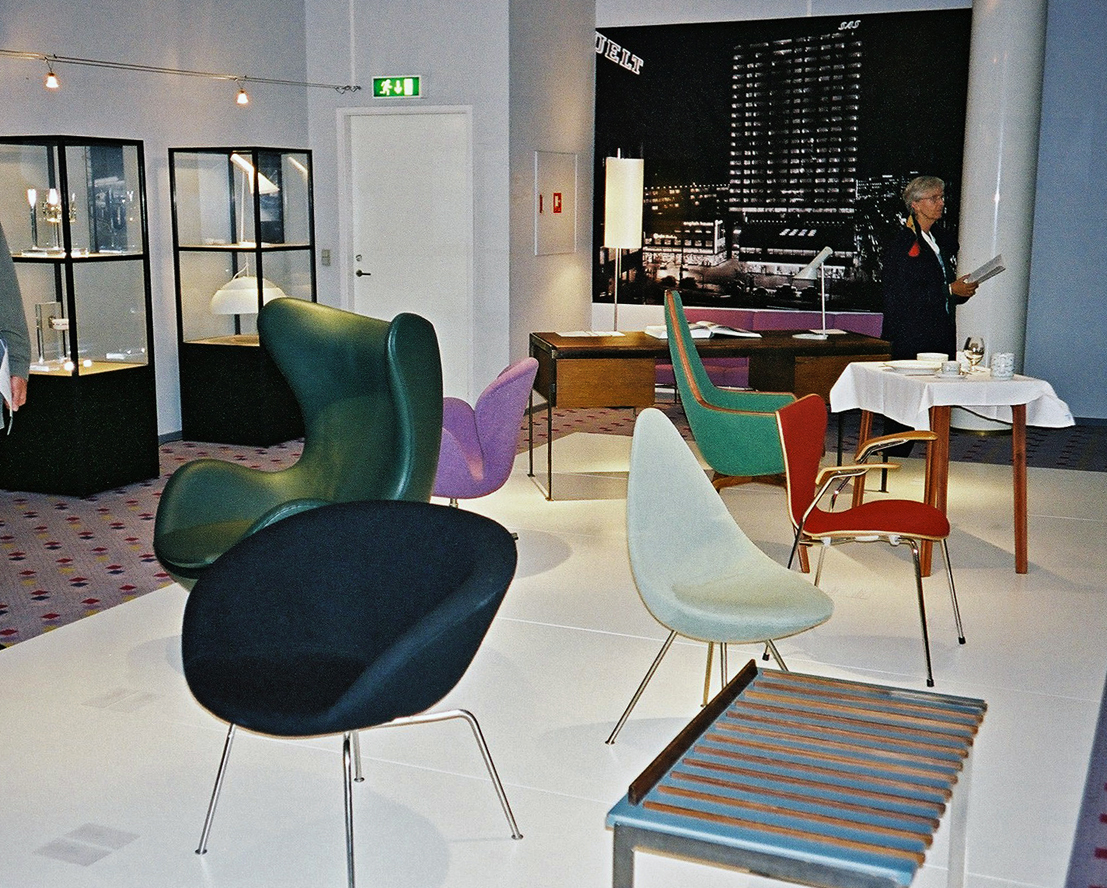
An exhibition with Jacobsen's furniture etc. at SAS Royal Hotel in Copenhagen 2000.
