= Benjamin Hubert (designer) =

British industrial designer

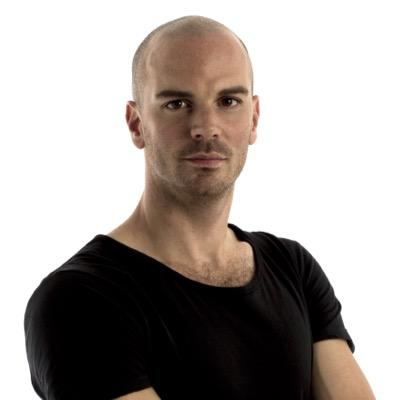
Hubert in 2015

Benjamin Hubert (born 11 March 1984) is a British industrial designer and founder of LAYER, a London-based design agency known for its work in industrial design. His studio has collaborated with global brands across technology, furniture, mobility, and consumer goods. Hubert studied Industrial Design and Technology at Loughborough University, graduating in 2006.

== Career ==
Hubert established Benjamin Hubert Ltd. in 2010, which was rebranded as LAYER in 2015. LAYER was described by Wallpaper as a "transition from eponymous designer brand to a larger entity, with a wider scope and reach". LAYER has collaborated with brands such as Airbus, Bang & Olufsen, Braun, Fritz Hansen, Samsung, and Vitra on projects including furniture, consumer electronics, wearables, homewares, transport, and public art installations. Hubert's design practice has a focus on sustainable solutions. In 2025, Hubert hosted 101010, an exhibition to mark the 10th anniversary of LAYER at 10 Corso Como during Milan Design Week, presenting a collection of prototypes addressing contemporary global challenges.

== Projects ==
Hubert has led the development of numerous projects at both Benjamin Hubert Ltd. and LAYER including:

Juliet Chair for Poltrona Frau (2012) – Hubert won a competition to design a chair to celebrate the centenary of Italian furniture brand Poltrona Frau.

Change Box for Maggie's (2015) – A new charity collection box for cancer charity Maggie's.

GO wheelchair for Nike (2016) – A custom-fit 3D-printed mobility device developed with Nike and Materialise. The wheelchair won a Fast Company Innovation by Design Award.

Foil for Braun (2016) – An installation in the Tapestry Room of the Victoria and Albert Museum in London in collaboration with German brand Braun during London Design Festival.

Tape for Moroso (2018) – A modular sofa for Italian brand Moroso that launched at Milan's Salone del Mobile in April 2018.

Airbus Move (2019) – A lightweight airline seating concept designed for greater efficiency and sustainability.

Strand for Muuto (2019) – A collection of lighting made using a cocoon polymer material sprayed over a steel frame.

Bang & Olufsen Beosound Balance (2020) – A smart speaker integrating advanced technology with minimalist aesthetics. In 2021, Hubert collaborated with Bang & Olufsen on a second speaker, Beosound Emerge.

Viture One for Viture (2022) – A wearable XR device that allows users to stream media and games discreetly anywhere, creating a 120-inch virtual screen.

Ledger Stax (2023) – A cryptocurrency wallet designed by Hubert and iPhone co-creator Tony Fadell.

Earth Rated rebrand (2023) – A complete rebranding project for Earth Rated, including branding, packaging, and a collection of dog toys.

Concept View for Deutsche Telekom (2024) – A concept for a holographic home hub featuring a 3D AI-driven assistant for digital interactions.

== Publications ==
- LAYER (2023) Phaidon. ISBN 978-1838660710

== Awards ==
Hubert has received multiple international design awards, including the iF Product Design Award, Red Dot Design Award, and the Fast Company Innovation by Design Award.
