= Louise Campbell (designer) =

Danish furniture designer

- Born: 1970 (age 54–55); Copenhagen, Denmark
- Education: London College of Furniture (1992), Royal Danish Academy of Fine Arts (1995)
- Occupation: Designer
- Website: louisecampbell.com

Louise Campbell (born 1970) is a Danish furniture and lighting designer. She is a leading figure in contemporary Danish design and experiments with free, unconstrained forms and new technologies. She was born to a Danish father and an English mother.

== Career ==
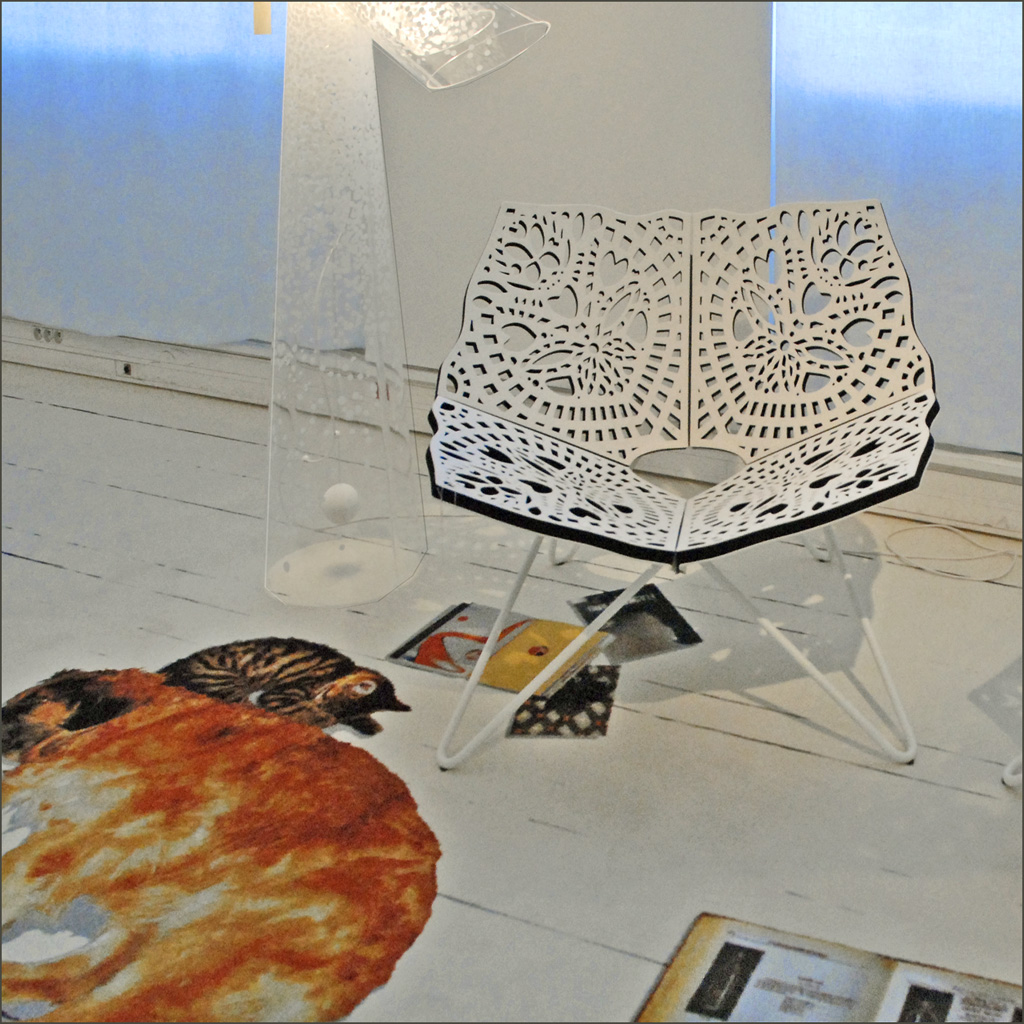
Prince chair by Louise Campbell

Campbell's interest in design is focused on furniture and lighting, but she is also involved in product and interior design projects. Some of the companies she has worked with include: Louis Poulsen, Zanotta, HAY, Royal Copenhagen, Holmegaard, Stelton, Muuto, Interstop, and the Danish Ministry of Culture.

She is best known for the Prince Chair that she designed as her entry for a 2002 competition hosted by the Association of Danish Furniture Industries. The competition invited designers to create a chair for Frederik, Crown Prince of Denmark. Although Campbell did not win the competition, the chair won several awards and HAY picked it up to manufacture. It is now a part of the Museum of Modern Art's collection. The chair itself resembles an "unfolded paper cutout" and was inspired by Hans Christian Andersen's archival museum paper cutouts.

She is also known for the Collage pendant lamp designed for Louis Poulsen, the "More the Merrier" candlestick created for Muuto, and the "Campbell Pendant" (2005) for Louis Poulsen, which won the iF Product Design Award in gold.

== Awards ==
- 2004 Finn Juhl Prize
- 2005 iF Product Design Award in gold for Campbell Pendlen .
- 2007 Bruno Mathsson Award (Sweden)
- 2009 Prince Eugen Medal

== Books ==
- Louise Campbell, Mads Nygaard Folkmann, Aschehoug, Denmark Copenhagen 2007, ISBN 978-87-11-23253-8
