= Edvard Kindt-Larsen =

Danish architect and furniture designer

Edvard Kindt-Larsen (1901–1982) was a Danish architect and furniture designer who worked closely together with his wife Tove Kindt-Larsen (1906–1994). From the 1930s to the 1960s, the couple were among Denmark's predominant designers, active the areas of architecture, furniture design, silverware and textiles.

== Early life ==
Much of Kindt-Larsen's success is due to collaboration with his wife Tove whom he married in 1937. Both had studied under Kaare Klint at the Royal Danish Academy of Fine Arts in the late 1920s. Working as a team, they exhibited a high sense of quality and appreciation of current trends.

== Furniture ==
They specialized in furniture design, presenting their work at the annual exhibitions of the Cabinetmakers Guild, organised by Edvard from 1943 to 1966. Their pieces for factory production were rather simple in design but they also designed more elaborate individual pieces. Kindt-Larsen was fascinated by the idea of contrasts, as can be seen in his furniture where he often combined glossy painted surfaces with untreated wood or simply used several different kinds of wood for a given item.

== Other areas of design ==
The couple also designed home textiles for Gabriel in Fredericia and silverware for A. Michelsen. A silver bracelet designed in 1952 was relaunched by Georg Jensen as a watch in 1993. Kindt-Larsen also worked as an architect. Of particular merit is the house he designed for himself in Klampenborg (1949). He was awarded the Eckersberg Medal in 1949.

== See also ==
- Danish modern
- Danish design
