= Karen Clemmensen =

Danish architect and designer

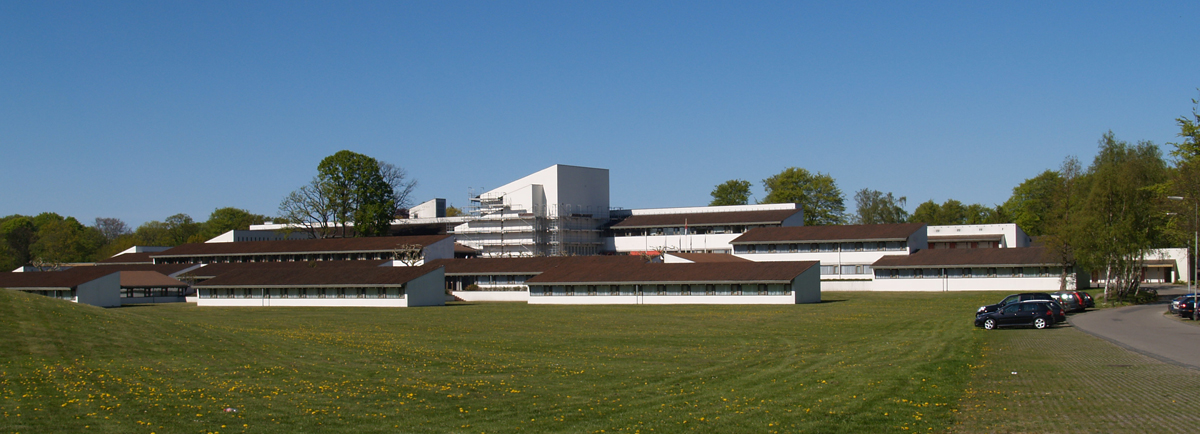
Karen and Ebbe Clemmensen: LO-skolen, Helsingør (1975)

Karen Clemmensen (née Mundt; 31 December 1917 – 21 December 2001) was a Danish architect and designer. The firm she set up with her husband Ebbe designed both traditional and more modern Functionalist buildings. Often inspired by Japanese and American trends, their work includes Kildeskovshallen in Gentofte and LO-skolen in Helsingør.

== Early life ==
Karen Clemmensen was born in Copenhagen to an artistic family. Her father Holger Mundt (1887–1957) was an architect and her mother Harriet Fischer-Jørgensen (1889–1975) a painter. After completing her schooling at Sønderborg Statsskole in 1935, she attended the Danish Academy until 1942. From 1939 to 1941, she worked part-time for Kaj Gottlob, also a successful architect.

== Career ==
While at the Academy, the pair met Eva and Nils Koppel and Tobias Faber who found work for them in a Stockholm studio during the war years. It was here they came in contact with Japanese architecture, including the Zui Ki Tei teahouse in the Ethnographic Museum, which influenced many of their later projects. After the birth of her first child in 1945, Eva Koppel worked for the city architect while setting up her own firm with her husband. For the first 10 years, there were no major projects. In 1947, together with Holger Mundt, they restored Kliplev Church in the south of Jutland. After Ebbe had been given a post at the Academy, the couple built a house for themselves in Gentofte in 1953 adopting a simple Functionalist style.

From the mid-1950s, as a result of success in a number of competitions, they received several important commissions, their designs often inspired by Tetsurō Yoshida's Das japanische Wohnhaus or by the American architects Ludwig Mies van der Rohe and Frank Lloyd Wright. Japanese influence can be seen in their use of timber overhangs and an atrium yard at Skive Seminarium (1959) while Blågård Seminarium and Enghavegård School both have a more international Cubist appearance with glazed facades and flat roofs. Subsequent educational institutions such as Højstrupgård and the LO-skole in Helsingør also had an atrium yard as their central feature as well as structures of various sizes to suit the needs of the courses to be taught. Care was also taken to provide a high level of interior decoration with the assistance of appropriate experts. The swimming facilities at Kildeskovhallen (1972) in Gentofte present an elegant blend of modern and traditional design with huge glazed facades looking out towards the forest.

The couple also undertook church restoration work, arranged exhibitions of furniture, crafts and graphics and designed textiles. Karen produced some fine graphic works including Christmas wrapping designs. As a result of her graphic work, she was awarded the Knod V. Engelhardt Memorial Scholarship in 1948. Together with her husband, she received the Eckersberg Medal in 1961. Karen Clemmensen was also a member of several adjudicating panels for school projects, urban planning, and architecture awards.

== See also ==
- Architecture of Denmark
