= Cecilie Manz =

Danish industrial designer (born 1972)

- Born: 1972 (age 53–54); Odsherred, Zealand, Denmark
- Education: Danish Design School; Finnish School of Art and Design
- Years active: 1997–present
- Website: www.ceciliemanz.com

Cecilie Manz (born 1972) is a Danish industrial designer. In November 2017, Manz was awarded designer of the year in the Design Awards by Bo bedre, Costume Living, Nordic Living and Boligmagasiet. In September 2014, she won the Danish Crown Prince Couple's Culture Award (Kronprinsparrets Kulturpris) for her contribution to design.

Her work of includes furniture, jewellery, lamps and sculptures. Her Mikado table has been included in MOMA's design collection.

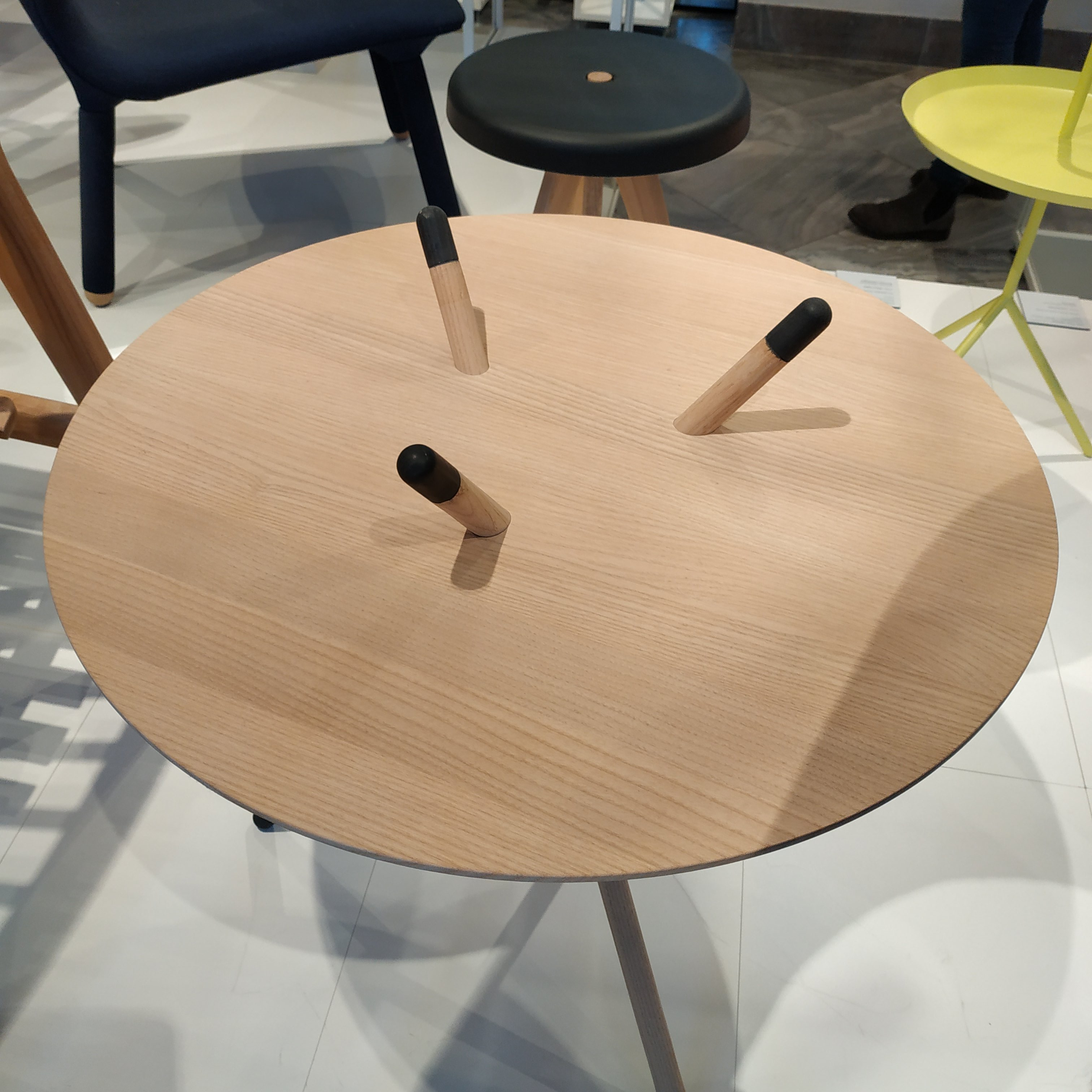
Manz's Micado side table

== Early life ==
Cecilie Manz was born in 1972 in Denmark's Odsherred region on the island of Zealand. She was admitted to the Danish Design School in Copenhagen and went to Helsinki as an exchange student, studying at the Finnish School of Art and Design, before she graduated in 1997. She then worked briefly in Professor Yrjö Wiherheimo's studio in Helsinki before returning to Copenhagen, where she founded her own Manz Lab in 1998.

== Designs ==
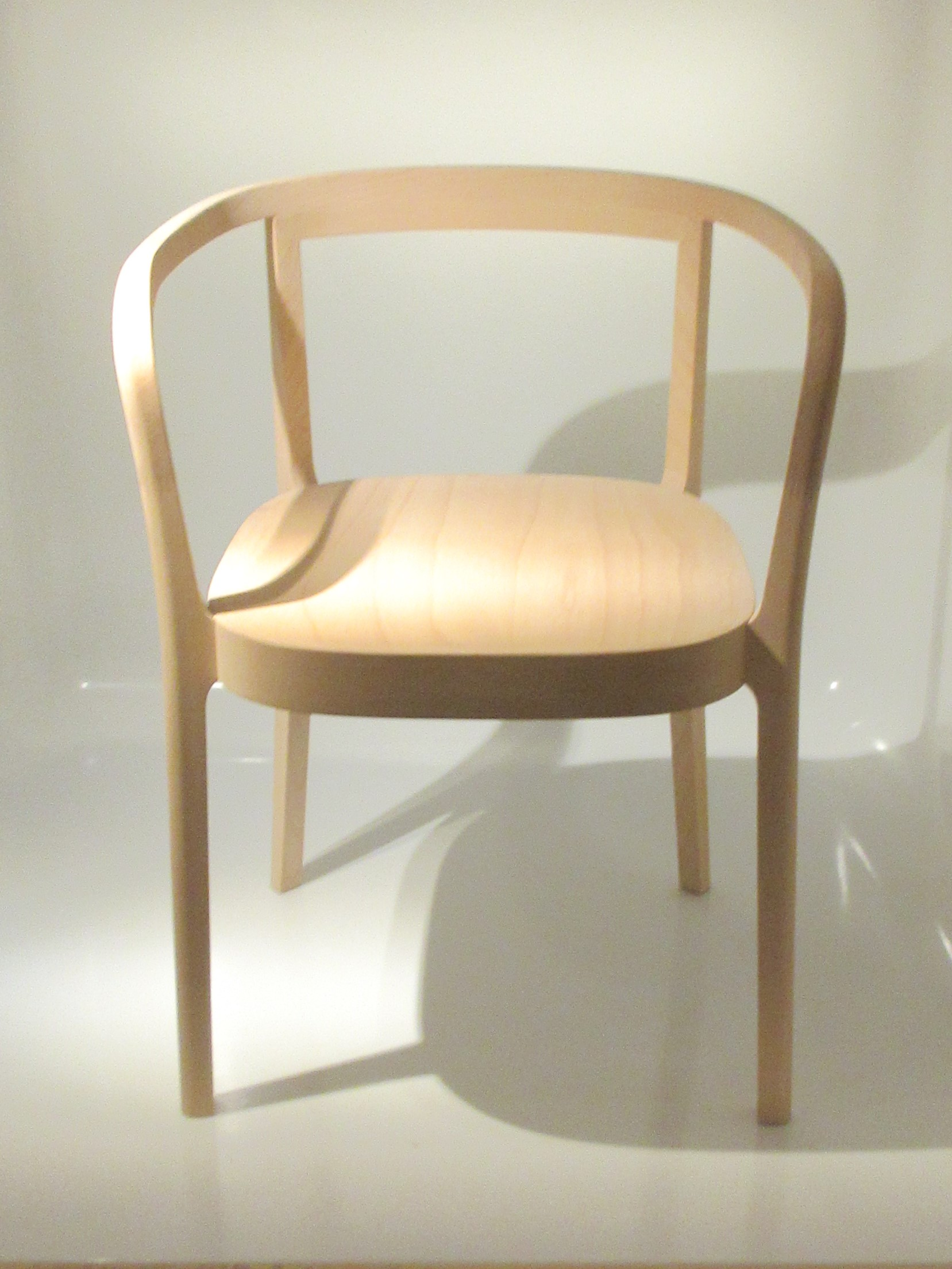
Moky chair, 2016, Danish Design Museum, Copenhagen

Manz has designed for brands such as Lightyears, Holmegaard, Nils Holger Moormann, Fredericia Furniture, Fritz Hansen, Muuto and Mooment.

Some of her most known designs include the Caravaggio lamp for Lightyears and the Mikado table.

More recently, she has worked with Bang & Olufsen designing the functional but retro-looking speaker line of BeoLit AirPlay speakers and the BeoPlay Bluetooth speaker lineup for the company.

In awarding her the Crown Prince Couple's Culture Prize in 2014, Prince Frederik commented: "The fascinating thing about Cecilie Manz's design is that despite the diversity of her work, there is a clearly discernible tone. The basic idea is always strong in Manz's design, evoking associations with historical realisations in design while clearly reflecting the present."

== Awards and recognition ==
- 2004: 3-years work grant, Danish Arts Foundation
- 2004: Danish Design Award
- Forum +1 Award
- 2007 iF product design award
- 2007 Finn Juhl Prize
- 2008 Danish Design Award
- 2014 Danish Crown Prince Couple's Culture Prize
- 2017 Designer of the year, Design Awards 2017, Bo Bedre, Costume Living, Nordic Living, Boligmagasinet

== Exhibitions ==
=== Solo exhibitions ===
- Cecilie Manz – Status, Danish Design Center, Copenhagen

=== Group exhibitions ===
- Walk the Plank I + II, Danish Museum of Art & Design, Copenhagen (1999 and 2003)
- Living in Motion, Vitra Design Museum, Basel (2002
- Northern Lights, MDS-G Miyake Design Studio Gallery, Tokyo (2004
- Grand Danois, Zona Tortona., Milan Furniture Fair, Milan (2008)
- Mindcraft, 100 Design, London (2008)
- Shh…Craft is Golden!, Zona Tortona., Milan Furniture Fair, Milan (2009)
