= Molded plywood =

Engineered wood product

Molded plywood is the term for two- or three-dimensionally shaped products from multiple veneer layers that are glued together through heat and pressure in a pressing tool. The veneer layers are arranged crosswise at an angle of 90 degrees. Molded wood is used for flat furniture components such as seats, backrests and seat shells. When the veneer layers are arranged in the same direction, it is called laminated wood. It is used for armrests and chair frames. After pressing, the blanks are processed mechanically. A particular feature is the ability to produce different variations of shapes from the blanks. Due to its immense strength and low weight, molded wood is particularly suitable for interior decoration, seating furniture, bed slats, skateboards and vehicle construction.

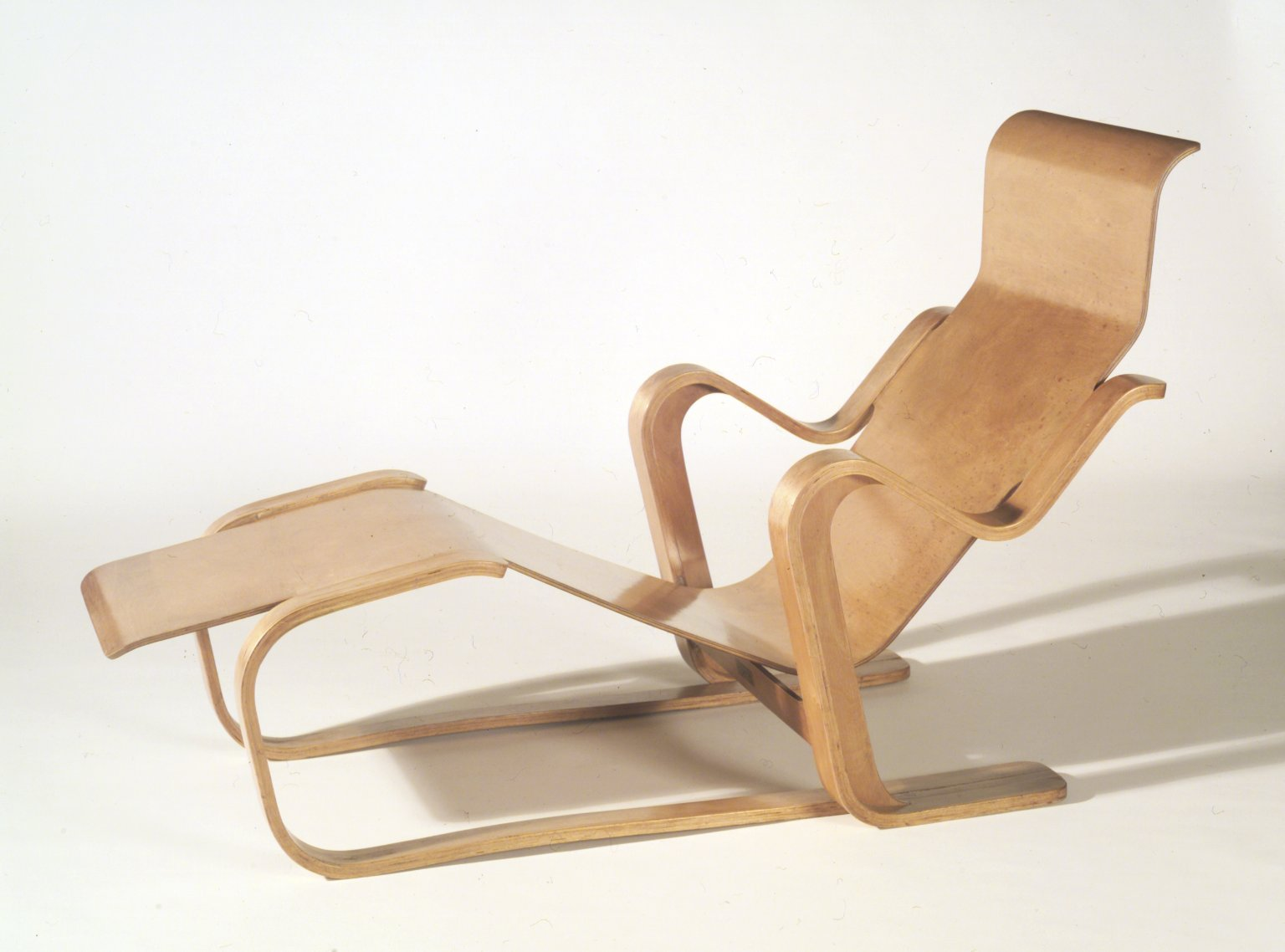
Marcel Breuer Long Chair 1935-36

== History of molded wood ==
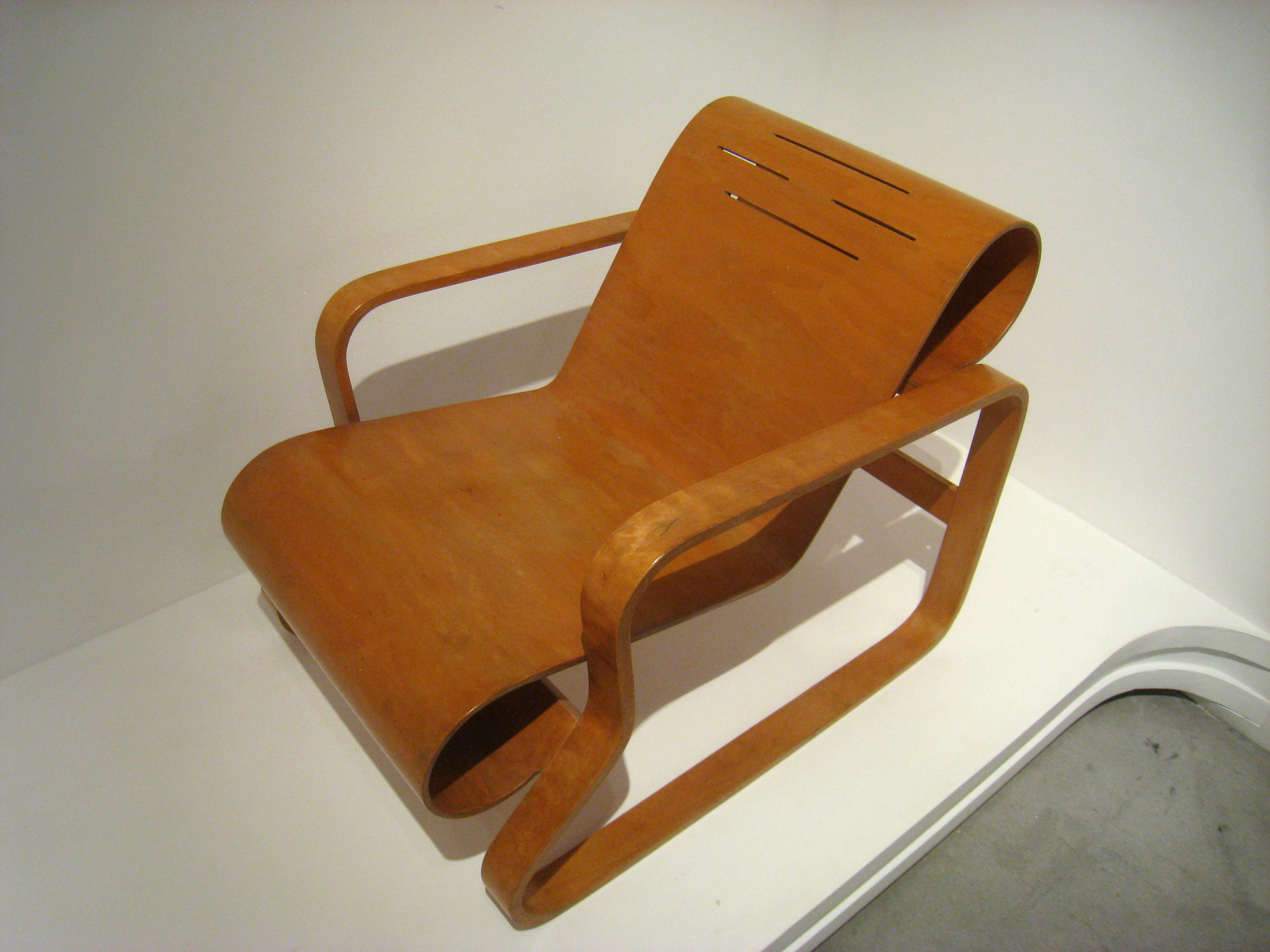
Paimio Chair by Alvar Aalto from 1931–1932

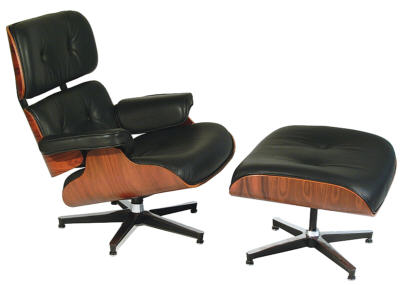
Ray and Charles Eames Lounge Chair 1956

It was an American named Isaac Cole who first took out a patent for the process of the production of molded wood in 1874. He designed a chair made of glue-laminated wooden strips.

However, in 1830 the famous furniture designer Michael Thonet had already begun to experiment with the gluing of veneer layers. He only managed to produce two-dimensional deformations though. He stopped these experiments and developed the bentwood process to produce three-dimensional molded wood components made of solid wood. With the model S43, the company "Gebrüder Thonet" launched the first cantilever chair in 1931.

To make the chair very comfortable without padding and to give it a light appearance, designer Mart Stam used three-dimensionally shaped plywood parts for its seat and back. Finnish designer Alvar Aalto was the first to deliberately implement the natural spring effect of the material when he created his model "Paimio" in the 1930s. Marcel Breuer created the Long Chair in 1935–1936. Five years later, the architects and designers Charles Eames and Eero Saarinen won a furniture design competition in New York with a three-dimensionally shaped shell.

After that, Eames and his wife Ray developed the spectacular plywood furniture collection for the company Herman Miller (USA). In Europe, Arne Jacobsen presented a modernist-style chair with the unusual name "Ant" in 1952, in which the seat and back are self-supporting and connected by a narrow waist.

== Terminology ==
=== Molded plywood ===
Term for molded parts made from at least three thin veneers that are glued together with the grain of each running at a 90° angle to that in the next layer. This interlocking pattern greatly reduces swelling and shrinking and generates more resistance in the surface. These properties are used in two-dimensional moldings such as seats, backrests and shells. The veneer qualities can be put together for visible or upholstered molded plywood parts. The inner layers are made of less expensive peeled veneers. The top layers can be selected from peeled veneers, fine wood sliced veneers or laminates.

=== Laminated wood ===
Laminated wood is the term for moldings where the grain in all layers runs parallel. To increase the bending strength and reduce the swelling and shrinking behavior, laminated wood is interlocked with some transverse veneers for certain applications. Laminated wood is used for chair frames, cantilever side parts and armrests.

By employing laminated wood gussets (triangular), the wood joints can be pressed at the same time (see picture). The thickness of the molded parts can be varied by using partially ground interior veneers. Compared to molded plywood, the tensile strength is significantly higher.

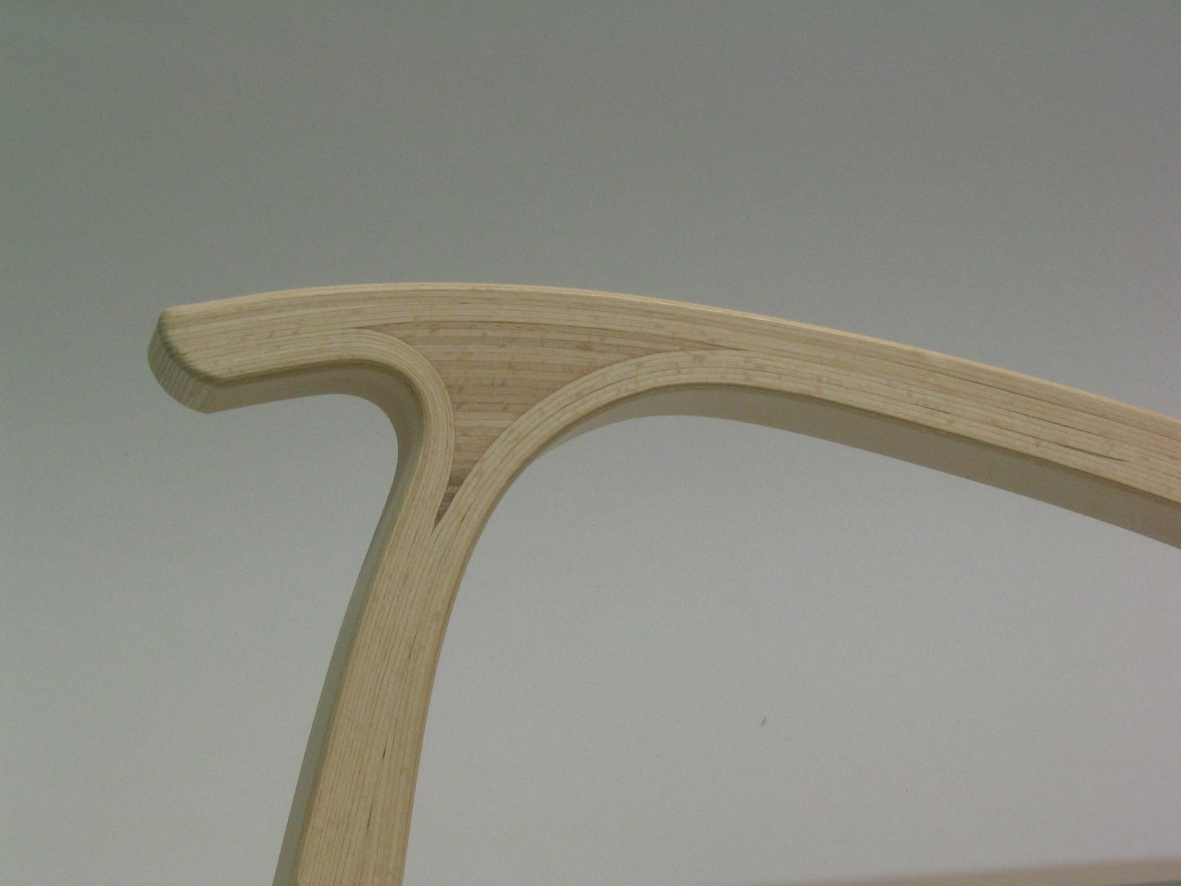
Laminated wood

== Production ==
The production process is divided into three steps. First the peeled veneer is produced, then it is pressed into molded plywood or laminated wood blanks which are subsequently processed. This results in ready to install furniture or interior design components.

In Europe, beech wood is used. It is available in large quantities from sustainably managed forests. In Northern and Eastern Europe, birch wood is frequently used. In North America, Hard maple is used. The tree trunks are harvested only during the winter, outside the sap-flow period, and need to be sprayed with water in the storage area or stored under water.

=== Production of veneers ===
For the production of veneers, the logs are steamed with hot water vapor in steam pits at 85 degrees Celsius. This makes the wood high in moisture and pliable. The next steps are the logs separation and the debarking. The lengths of the log sections are based on the veneer sizes required for the orders. In the peeling line, the peeling blade is led with high pressure against the rotating log section.

The result is a continuous veneer strip which is cut into the required widths. You can create veneers with thicknesses of 0.6 mm to 2.3 mm. The veneers are still wet when they come out and run through the drying area. Immediately after that the peeled veneers are automatically sorted according to their visual qualities. They are divided into two categories: one for visible use and one with knots and cracks that are used for moldings that will later be fully upholstered.

=== Pressing ===
When the veneer is prepared for an order, a pressing tool is incorporated into a press. The pressing tools can be made of two parts (for seats, backrests and shells) or several parts, e.g. for U-shaped moldings that also require pressure from the side. The pressing begins with glue being spread onto the veneer. The glue is made of urea-formaldehyde resin with a hardener that becomes thermosetting during the pressing process.

The so-called veneer packet is then inserted into the pressing tool that is at 100 degrees Celsius. The press is fed in. The pressing pressure is approximately 25 N/cm². The pressing time depends on the thickness of the molded parts. The thicker the part, the longer it is pressed. Shells need about 5 minutes, thicker side panels may take up to 20 minutes.

An exception is the high-frequency gluing, where the glued joint is heated via a capacitor field/ condenser field, which significantly reduces the pressing time. Therefore, this method is suitable for very thick moldings. Since veneer is a natural product, it is necessary to observe certain limitations in the pressing process. The smallest radius is dependent on the veneer thicknesses used and is 12 mm at a 90 degree angle. A taper of the moulded parts is possible.

There are hardly any limits for the possibilities of three-dimensional deformation of upholstered parts. Decorative wood allows for light deformations up to the occurrence of cracking or buckling of the veneer. What can be formed out of firm cardboard can also be made of molded plywood, since both behave in a similar way. These limits can be exceeded by the use of special 3D veneers, which are, expensive to produce and therefore entail additional costs.

=== Processing ===
The three-dimensionally shaped molded plywood blanks for seats, shells and backrests are formed using multi-axis computer numerical control (CNC) milling machines and are drilled where necessary after pressing. A new contour can be made simply by programming the milling machine differently, so a vast range of shapes can be made using the same basic process. With the edges sanded and the fastening mounts assembled, the parts are ready for finishing.

Molded plywood blanks for chair frames and components are automatically cut, ground and processed with fixtureless CNC milling machines. Special joining techniques can be used, such as screw, dowel, spring or mortise and tenon joints to produce pre-finished components or complete racks.

== Surfaces ==
The surfaces of veneer cross-plywood and laminated veneer lumber can be designed in many different ways by pressing the top layers of fine wood sliced veneers, such as oak, maple, cherry, ash, walnut and other woods. Further design possibilities offer colored melamine films; decorative films, digital prints and decorative laminates (HPL / CPL) and of course the pickling and painting, either transparent or opaque. Modern water-based paint systems are used for this.

== Features ==
Compared to other wood-based panels such as MDF or chipboard, molded plywood and laminated wood are very reliable. Therefore, they are suitable for a wide range of applications.

=== Strength ===
The tensile strength is 110-135 N/cm², depending on the type of wood. This ensures for the high load capacity and pleasant vibrations of cantilever chairs made of laminated wood, for example.

=== Compressive strength ===
With the types of wood that are used for molded wood, the compressive strength is between 50 and 62 N/cm². It guarantees long-lasting furniture that endures even frequent use as in schools, for instance.

=== Weather resistance ===
Beech wood is actually not suitable for outdoor use because it is very rapidly ruined by wood-destroying fungi. But through chemical or thermal changes it is possible to produce weather resistant molded plywood and laminated wood.

=== Flame retardant properties ===
By introducing salts in the production process, molded wood is made flame-retardant. This is an important aspect for interior design and in the creation of train seats.
