= Muuto =

Scandinavian furniture company

- Type: Subsidiary
- Founded: 2006
- Headquarters: Copenhagen, Denmark
- Area served: Global
- Key people: Kristian Byrge (Co-Founder) Peter Bonnén (Co-Founder Anders Cleemann (CEO)
- Products: Furniture, Lighting, Accessories
- Parent: MillerKnoll
- Website: muuto.com millerknoll.com

Muuto is a Scandinavian design company based in Copenhagen, Denmark. The product range includes furniture and other design products.

== History ==
Muuto was founded by Kristian Byrge and Peter Bonnen in 2006. Byrge had previously been involved in the foundation of Noma. In August 2014, Maj Invest Equity acquired a 45% share of the company. In December 2017, it was announced that Knoll had acquired Muuto with effect from January 2018 for US$300 million.

== Products ==
Muuto collaborates with leading Scandinavian designers who are paid through royalties. In 2019, Muuto launched the Strand collection of lighting with Benjamin Hubert, marking its first collaboration with a British designer. The products are sold through 1,300 distributors in 52 countries (2014).

== Muuto Talent Award ==
Since 2010 Muuto has hosted an annual talent award for Nordic student.

2012 winners

- 1st prize: David Geckeler (Royal Danish Design School) for Nerd Chair
- 2nd prize: Caroline Olsson (Akershus University) for Bambi Table
- 3rd prize: Marte Straalberg (Bergen National Academy of the Arts) for Sprinkle Lamp

== See also ==
- Scandinavian design
