= Steen Ostergaard =

Danish architect and designer (1935–2026)

Steen Ostergaard (21 December 1935 – 13 October 2026) was a Danish architect and industrial designer. One of his best-known designs is the '290' chair. This was the first chair to be used by injection molding could be produced in a single operation. Østergaard's designs are characterized by attention to aesthetics and human anatomy. Some of the designs that Østergaard made in the 1960s were relaunched in the early 21st century.

Steen Østergaard started his training with a furniture maker, after which he started his training as a furniture architect at the School of Arts and Crafts in 1957 Copenhagen. He graduated here in 1960. He was then an officer in the Danish army for two years.

From 1962 to 1966, Ostergaard worked for the Danish furniture architect Finn Juhl. From 1970 to 1975 he was chief designer and developer for architect Poul Cadovius. From 1978 to 1981 he was a manager at Wiltax, the largest clothing manufacturer in Denmark.

Østergaard's work was diverse. He designed numerous objects including barbecues, sandboxes, coffee tables, garden furniture, sofas, a coffee grinder, and a vacuum cleaner for hairdressers. His best-known work is the chair "290" from 1966, which was designed for the Danish furniture brand CADO. It is a stackable chair made from fiberglass and was the first piece of furniture that could be injection molded at once. Another well-known design is "The Ship", a sand and water trough shaped like a ship. This 1975 design for Dansk Lysreklame is also stackable and is made of polyurethane.

Ostergaard died 13 October 2026.
