= Kasper Salto =

Danish industrial designer (born 1967)

Kasper Salto (born 14 February 1967) is a Danish industrial designer, most known for his furniture designs. He is the grandson of painter, ceramist and writer Axel Salto.

== Biography ==
Kasper Salto was born on 14 February 1967 in Copenhagen, Denmark, as the son of textile artist Naja Salto and grandson of leading Danish ceramist Axel Salto. He first trained as a cabinet maker before attending the Danish Design School, graduating in 1994. From 1994 to 98 he worked for designer Rud Thygesen. At that time he met Peter Staerk: their friendship would have a deep influence on his professional life. In 1997, he designed the Runner chair for Peter Staerk who made the chair famous in Denmark, but also abroad.

In 1998 Salto opened his own design studio, working for companies such as Fritz Hansen, DubaB8, Engelbrechts and Lightyears. In 2003 he opened a new office, Salto & Sigsgaard, together with architect Thomas Sigsgaard.

== Selected works ==
- Runner chair, DubaB8
- ICE chair, Fritz Hansen A/S
- NAP chair, Fritz Hansen A/S
- Pluralis table

== Awards ==
Awards include:

- 1998 Spectrum Award for Product Excellence, London
- 1999 ID-prisen, Runner chair, DK
- 1999 G Prize, Japan
- 2003 Red Dot Award, Germany
- 2003 Danish Furniture Award, DK
- 2003 Le Grand Prix du Design, France
- 2005 Knud V. Engelhardts Grant, DK
- 2010 Finn Juul Prize, DK
- 2010 Danish Design award
- 2010 Designer of the year, Bo Bedre
- 2010 Design Week Award for the NAP chair
- 2011 Salto & Sigsgaard, winners of the competition “New furniture for The Trusteeship Council chamber in United Nations, NY.”
- 2012 Thorvald Bindesbøll medaljen
- 2013 Reddot design award, Germany

== Exhibitions ==
Exhibitions include:

- Cabinetmaker's Guild Exhibition, Copenhagen (1997, 1998, 1999)
- The Design Yearbook, Copenhagen (curated by Philippe Starck) (1997)
- Spectrum, London (1998)
- Living Danish Design, London (1999)
- Walk the Plank I & II, Danish Museum of Art & Design, Copenhagen (2000 and 2004)
- The Danish Wave, various locations (2000)
- Le Danemark Bouge, Paris (2002)
- Arne Jacobsen 100 Years, Maison du Danemark, Paris (2002)
- Young Nordic Design: The Generation X, New York, Washington D.C., Mexico City, Helsinki, Berlin, Montreal, Vancouver, Ottawa, Glasgow, Reykjavik (2002)
- Shh…Craft is Golden!, Zona Tortona, Milan Furniture Fair, Milan (2009)
