= Foersom and Hiort-Lorenzen =

Danish designers

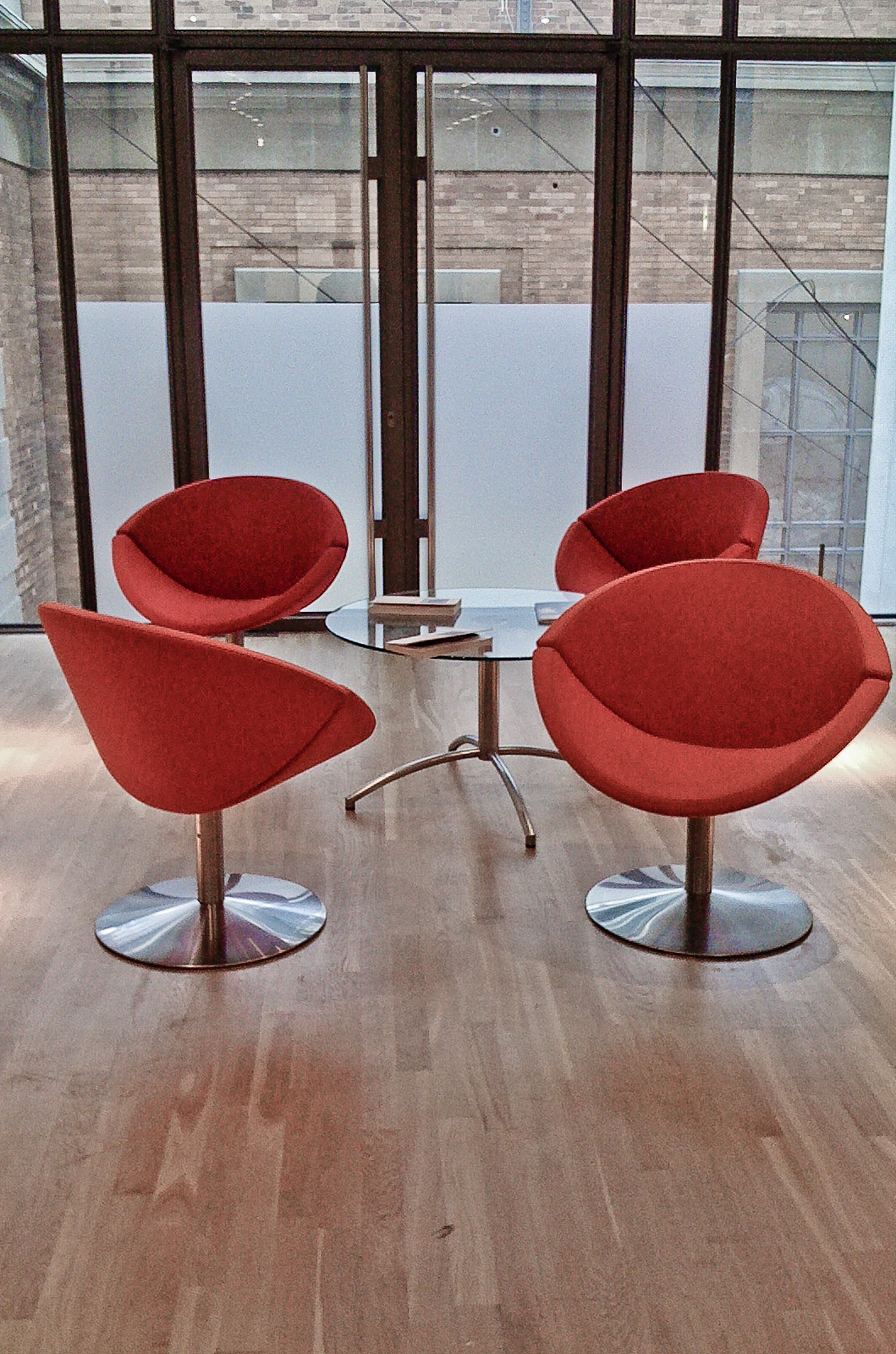
Foersom and Hiort-Lorenzen's Apollo chair viewed the Danish National Gallery

Foersom and Hiort-Lorenzen is a Danish design duo consisting of Johannes Foersom (born 1947) and Peter Hiort-Lorenzen (born 1943). They have collaborated since 1977 and won a number of awards for their furniture design.

== Education ==
Foersom trained to become a cabinetmaker with Gustav Berthelsen in Copenhagen, completing his apprenticeship in 1969. He then attended the Arts and Crafts School from where he graduated in 1972.

Hiort-Lorenzen became a ship carpenter at Helsingør Shipyard in 1962. He then attended the Arts and Crafts School, from where he graduated in 1965, and the Royal Danish Academy of Fine Arts graduating in 1968.

== Works ==
- Apollo chair
- Trinity chair
- Savannah lounge group

== Awards ==
- 1970, 1972, 1977: The Danish State Art's Fund
- 1974, 1975: Kröyer's Memorial Award
- 1980: Nationalbanken's Jubilee Fund
- 1985: Annual Award of the Danish Furniture manufacturers
- 1992, 1994, 1995, 1999: Design Zentrum Nordrhein Westfalen's Prize for high design quality
- 1994: Forsnäs Prize
- 1995, 1996, 1997_ Bo Bedre's Design Award
- 1995: Best of Neocon, Chicago
- 1998: Bruno Mathsson Award
- 2000: Excellent Swedish Form for table Atlas
- 2005: Finn Juhl Prize
