= Ant (chair) =

Chair designed by Arne Jacobsen

The Ant
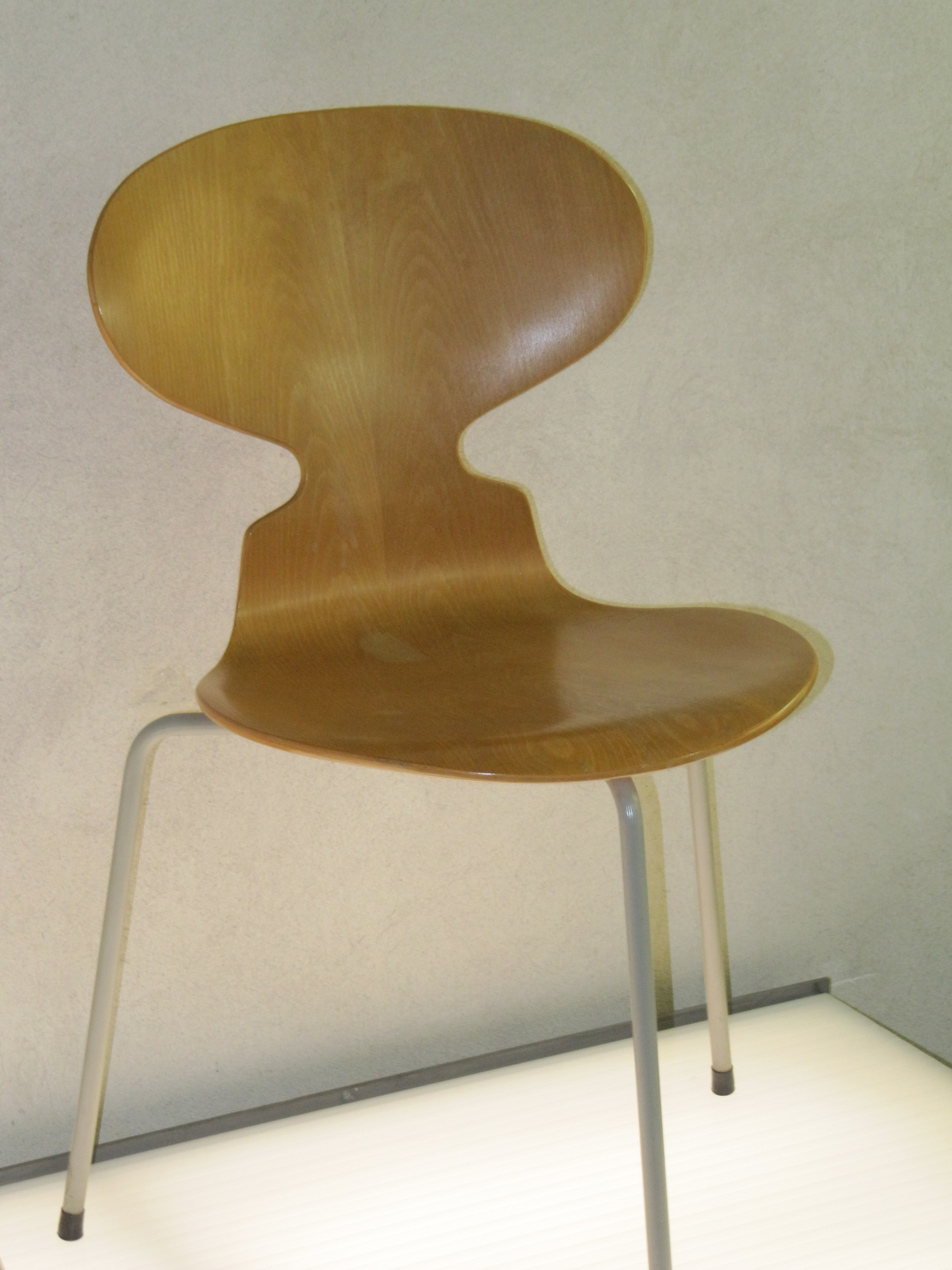
- Ant chair on display in Design Museum Denmark
- Designer: Arne Jacobsen
- Date: 1952
- Materials: Plastic, veneer
- Style / tradition: Modernist
- Sold by: Fritz Hansen (Denmark)

The Ant (Danish: Myren) chair is a classic of modern chair design. It was designed in 1952 by Arne Jacobsen for use in the canteen of the Danish pharmaceutical firm Novo Industries (now Novo).

== Design ==
The Ant was named for its approximate similarity to the outline of an ant with its head raised. The chair was designed to be light, stable, easy to stack up, and to minimise tangling the user's feet. The original model had three plastic legs and a seat made from form-moulded laminated veneer.

== History ==
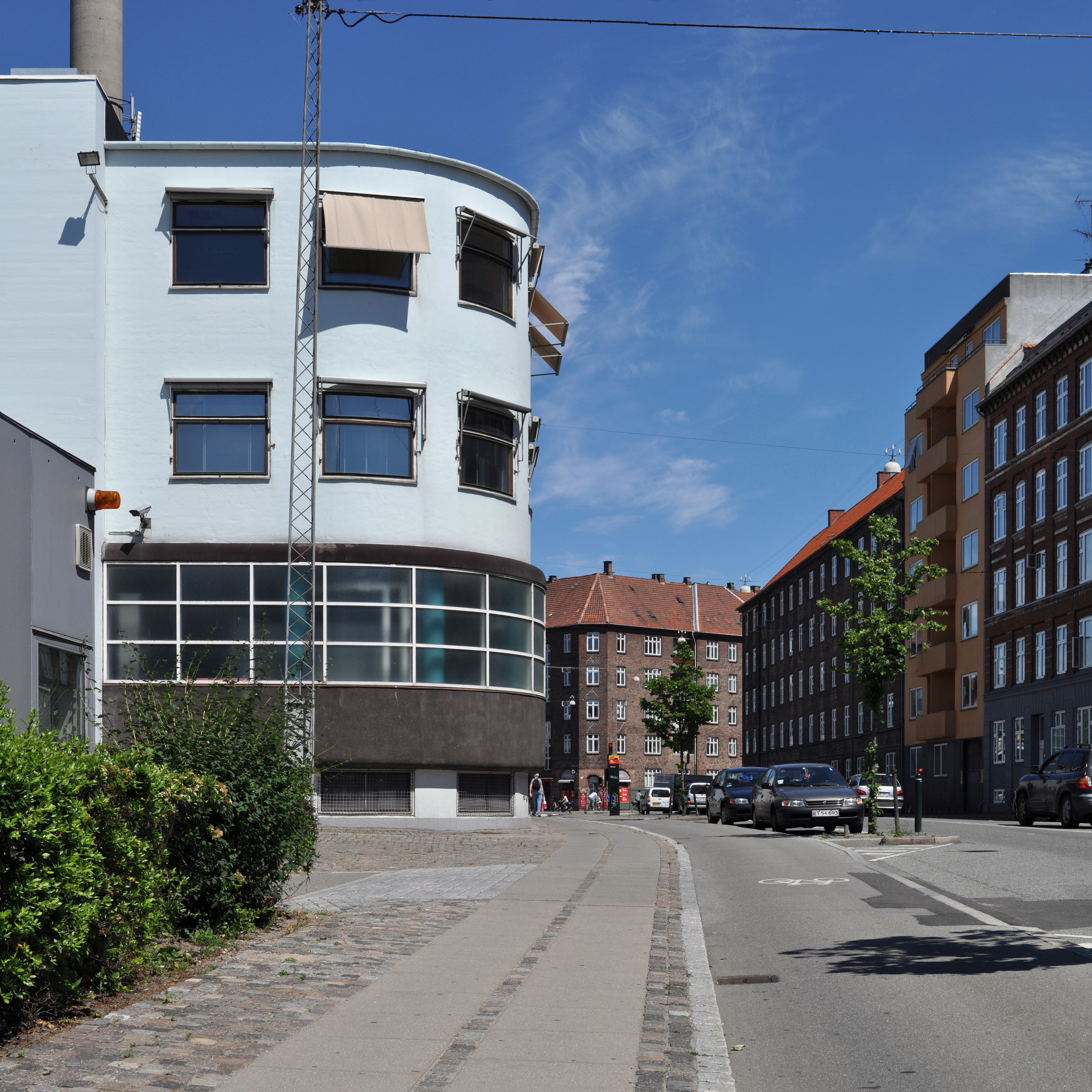
Novo's Arne Jacobsen-designed factory on Nordre Fasanvej

Jacobsen designed his first building for Novo Industries on Nordre Fasanvej in 1934–1935 and continued to work for them throughout his career, building several factories in Denmark and Germany. The Ant chair was created for the canteen of the Novo factory in Frederiksberg. Allegedly, Fritz Hansen had already been presented with Jacobsen's Ant chair design but was reluctant to put it into production. When a Novo director visited Jacobsen's studio and showed interest in the model, Jensen told him that it had been created for use in their canteen. Novo Industries ordered 300 of the chairs, enough to convince Fritz Hansen that it should go into production. The chair has since proved very popular, although the plastic in the legs was replaced by tubular steel, and a version with four legs was also made.

== Gallery ==
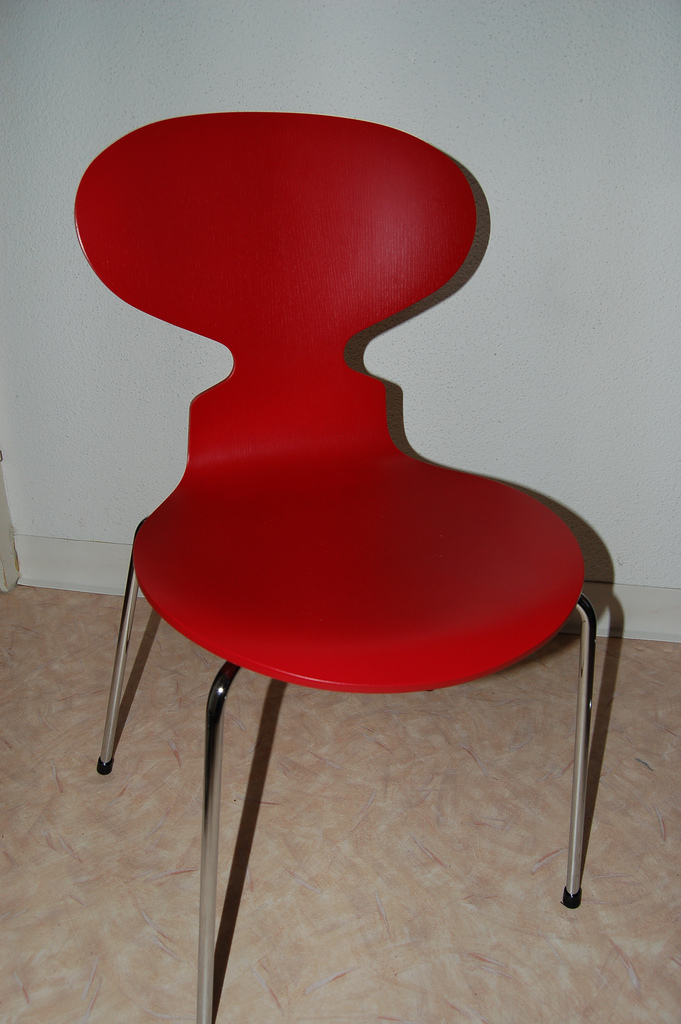
A four-legged version of the chair
