= Copenhagen Cabinetmakers' Guild Exhibition =

20th-century annual furniture exhibition and competition

Copenhagen Cabinetmakers' Guild Exhibition (Danish: Københavns Snedkerlaugs Møbeludstilling) was an annual furniture exhibition and competition held from 1927 to 1966 that served as a well-known institution of Danish Design and a vehicle for the emergence of the Danish Modern art movement. Many recognizable icons of Danish Modern were first unveiled as prototypes at the exhibition, including Hans Wegner's Round Chair, Aksel Bender Madsen and Ejnar Larsen's Metropolitan chair, Børge Mogensen's Spokeback Chair, and Finn Juhl's Chieftain Chair.

== History ==
The Exhibition was originally created out of fear that the Danish cabinetmaking craft industry would not be able to compete with more affordable furniture imports (primarily from Germany). After the Copenhagen Cabinetmakers Guild failed to lobby the Danish government to limit furniture imports, the organization established the exhibition to in order to increase awareness of the traditional craft and dissuade consumer from purchasing the cheaper imports.

The event sought to foster greater collaboration and experimentation between master cabinetmakers and architects. In some cases, these pairs established long-term working relationships, including Hans J. Wegner and Johannes Hansen, Finn Juhl and Niels Vodder, Ole Wanscher and A.J. Iversen, Jacob Kjær and Peder Moos, and Kaare Klint and Rud Rasmussen. In 1933, a design competition was added to the event format.

When American journalists attended the event the first time in 1949, their report of the event was the first coverage Danish Modern in the American media and helped foster international hype for the design trend in the 1950s. The Cabinetmakers' Guild held its final exhibition in 1966 after a decline in Danish furniture and few cabinetmakers remained in Copenhagen to sustain it.

== Revival ==
In 1981, the Snedkernes Efterårsudstilling was founded to revive the tradition of the defunct Cabinetmakers' Guild Exhibition: organizing an annual furniture exhibition for designers and manufacturers in Denmark.

== See also ==
- Danish Modern
- Stockholm Exhibition
