= Gammelgaard =

Gammelgaard is a Danish surname. Notable people with the surname include:

- Jørgen Gammelgaard (1938–1991), Danish furniture designer
- Lene Gammelgaard (born 1961), Danish author, motivational speaker, lawyer, journalist, and mountaineer
