= Danish modern =

Style of furniture

Selection of Danish Modern works
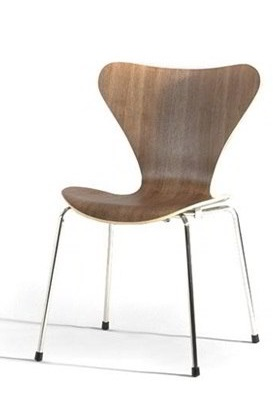
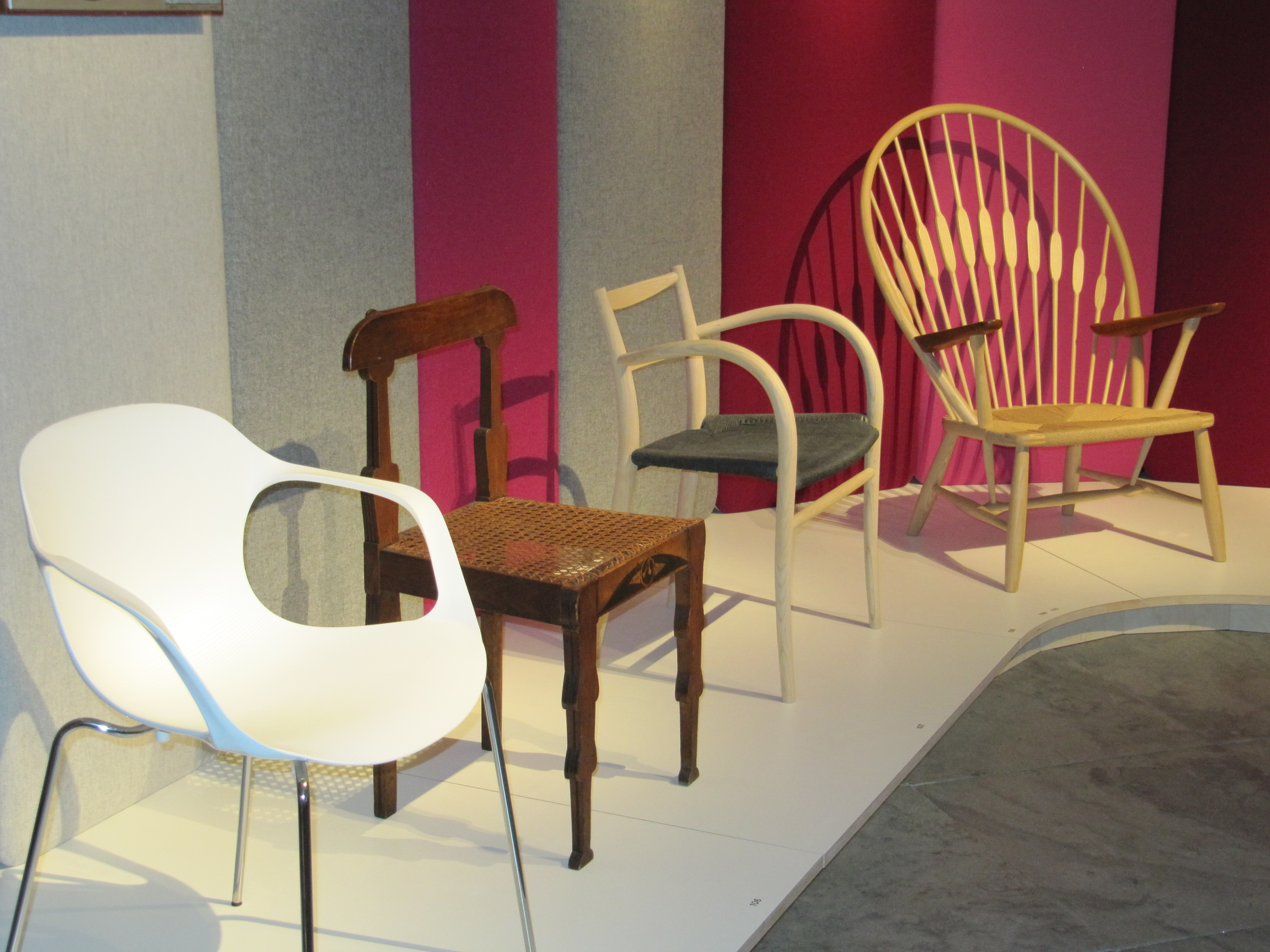
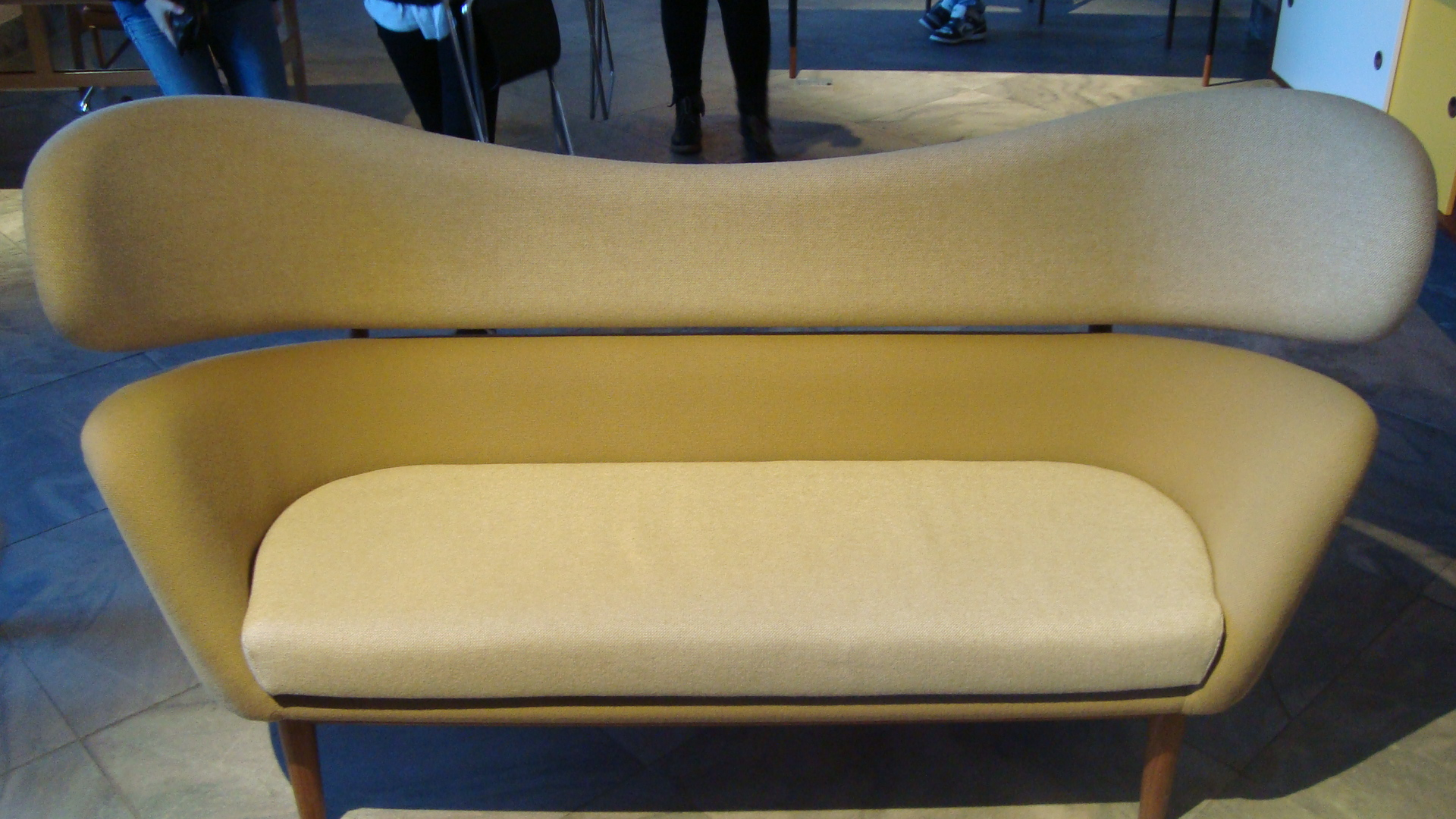
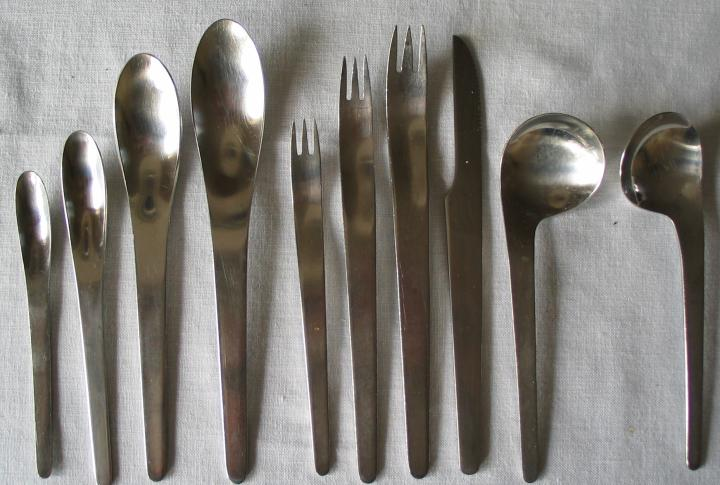
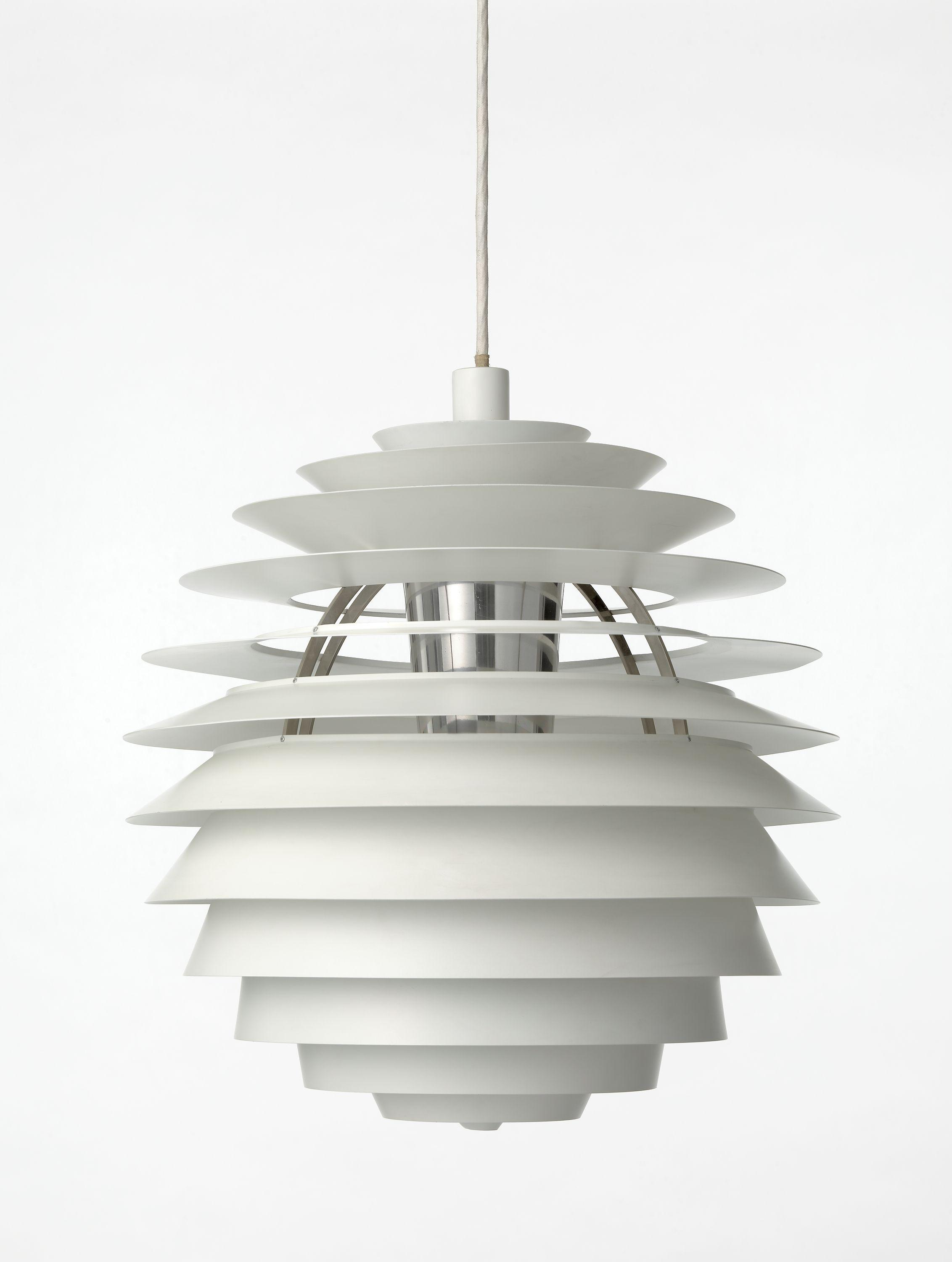
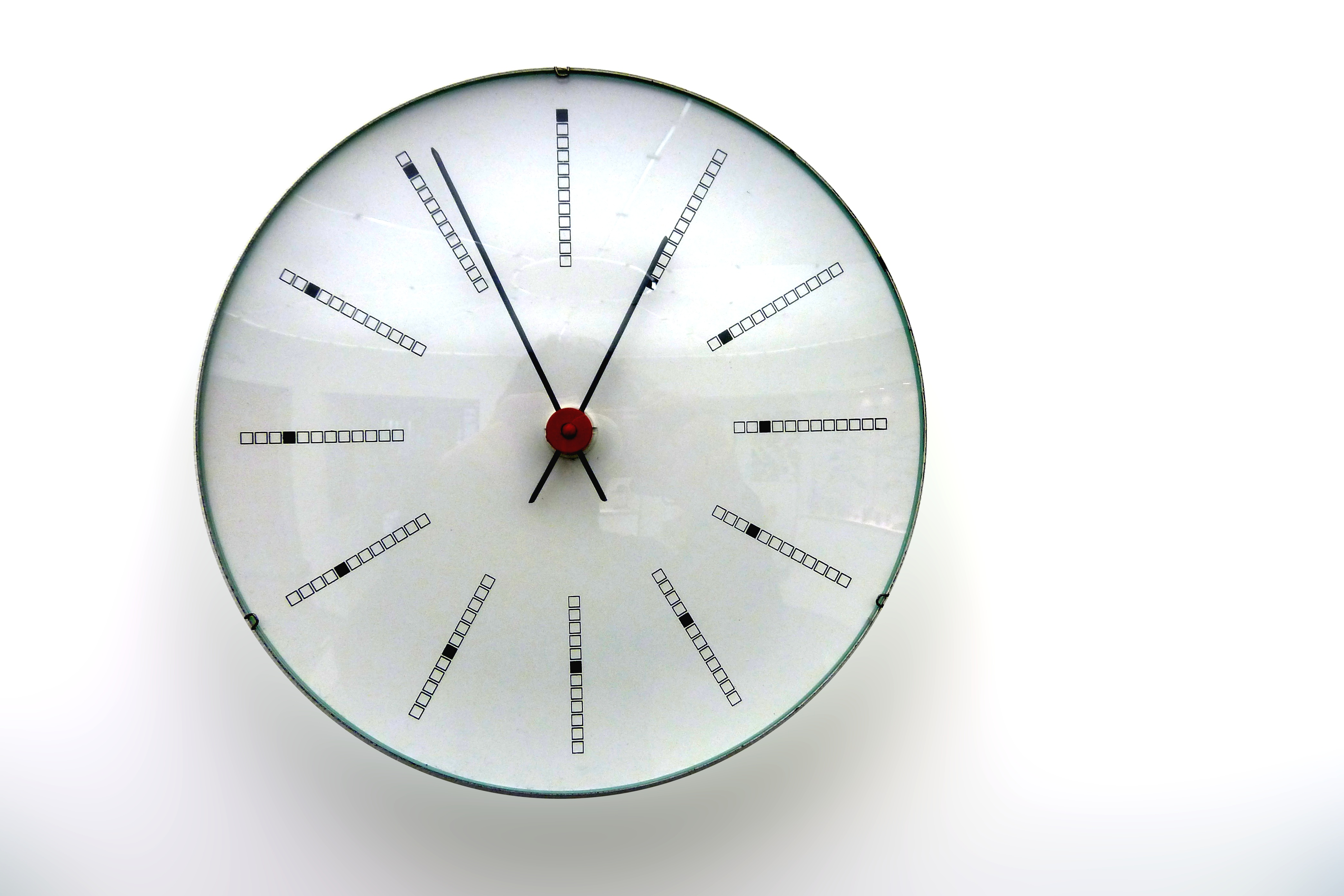
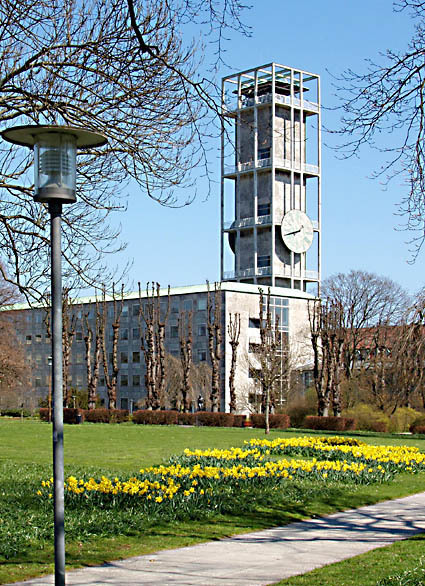
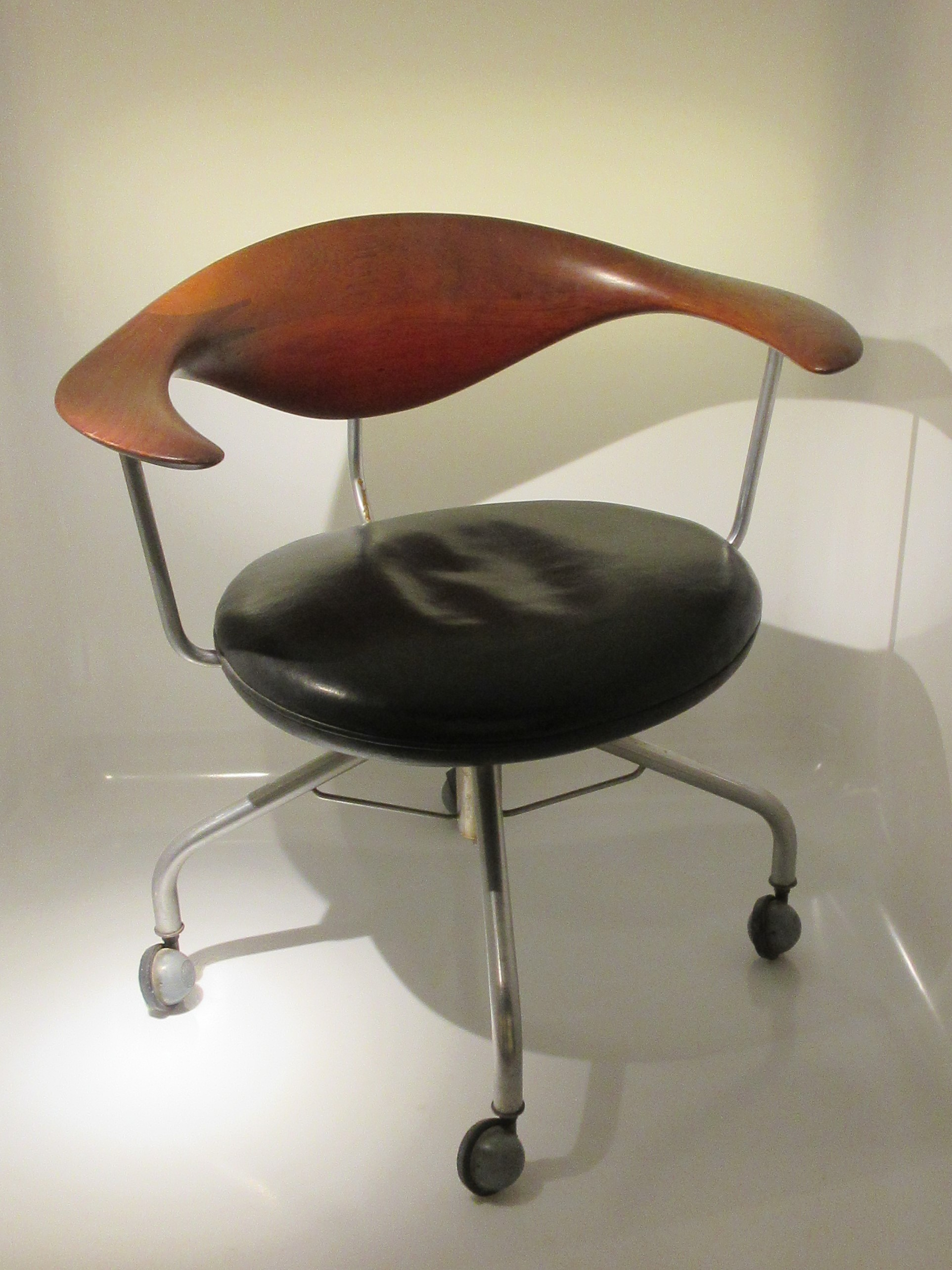

Danish modern also known as Scandinavian modern is a style of minimalist furniture and housewares from Denmark associated with the Danish design movement. In the 1920s, Kaare Klint embraced the principles of Bauhaus modernism in furniture design, creating clean, pure lines based on an understanding of classical furniture craftsmanship coupled with careful research into materials, proportions, and the requirements of the human body.

Designers such as Arne Jacobsen and Hans Wegner helped bring about a thriving furniture industry from the 1940s to the 1960s. Adopting mass-production techniques and concentrating on functional form, Finn Juhl contributed to the style's success. Additionally, minimalist Danish housewares such as cutlery and trays of teak and stainless steel and dinnerware such as those produced in Denmark for Dansk International Designs in its early years, expanded the Danish modern aesthetic beyond furniture.

== History ==
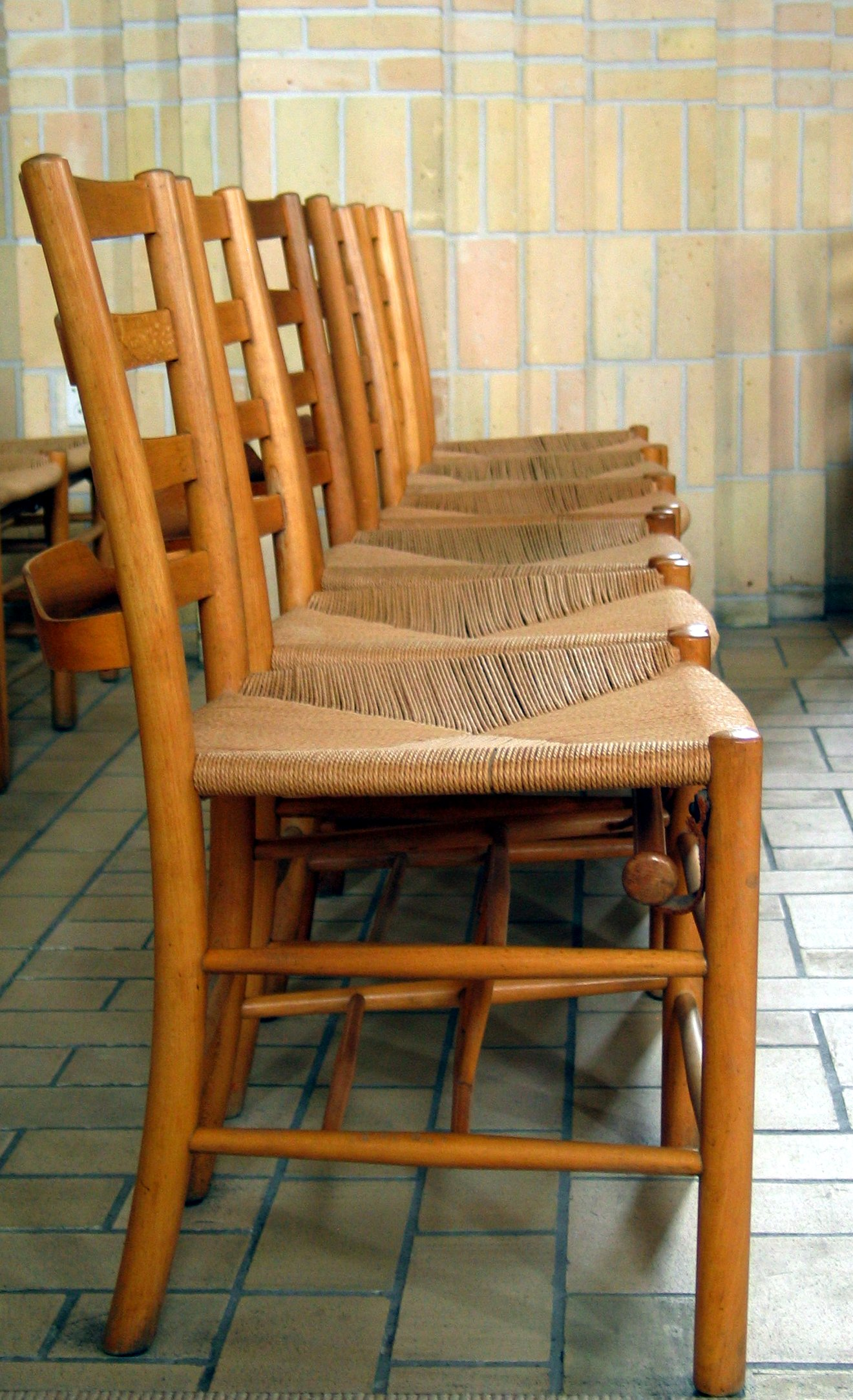
Kaare Klint: Church Chair (1936)

=== Origin ===
Between the two world wars, Kaare Klint exerted a strong influence on Danish furniture making. Appointed head of the Furniture Department at the Architecture School of the Royal Danish Academy of Fine Arts, he encouraged his students to take an analytical approach, adapting design to modern-day needs. Adopting the Functionalist trend of abandoning ornamentation in favour of form, he nonetheless maintained the warmth and beauty inherent in traditional Danish cabinet making, as well as high-quality craftsmanship and materials.

The development of modern Danish furniture owes much to the collaboration between architects and cabinetmakers. Cabinetmaker A. J. Iversen, who had successfully exhibited furniture from designs by architect Kay Gottlob at the International Exposition of Modern Industrial and Decorative Arts in 1925 in Paris, was instrumental in fostering further partnerships. In 1927, with a view to encouraging innovation and stimulating public interest, the Danish Cabinetmakers Guild organized a furniture exhibition in Copenhagen which was to be held every year until 1967. It fostered collaboration between cabinetmakers and designers, creating a number of lasting partnerships including those between Rudolph Rasmussen and Kaare Klint, A. J. Iversen and Ole Wanscher, and Erhard Rasmussen and Børge Mogensen. From 1933, collaboration was reinforced as a result of the annual competition for new types of furniture, arranged each year prior to the exhibition.

In 1931, another key institution in the development of Danish Modern formed; The Association of Arts (Danish: Forening for Kunsthaandværk) founded a permanent venue for arts and craft called Den Permanente.

=== Start of the Golden Age ===
In the post World War II years, Danish designers and architects believed that design could be used to improve people's lives. In the late 1940s, the growing middle class in Denmark began to show interest in Danish Modern and helped fuel further investment into the style. Particular attention was given to creating affordable furniture and household objects that were both functional and elegant. Fruitful cooperation ensued, combining Danish craftsmanship with innovative design. Initially, the furniture was handmade, but recognizing that their work would sell better if prices were reduced, the designers soon turned to factory production.

The scarcity of materials after the war encouraged the use of plywood. In the late 1940s, the development of new techniques led to the mass production of bent plywood designs by Hans Wegner and Børge Mogensen, both of whom produced chairs with a teak plywood seat and back on a beech frame. In 1951, Arne Jacobsen went even further with his sculptural Ant Chair with a one-piece plywood seat and back, bent in both directions. Collapsible chairs dating from the 1930s include Kaare Klint's Safari Chair and propeller stools which were also developed by Poul Kjærholm and Jørgen Gammelgaard.

Danish furniture exports grew from just DKK 0.8 million in 1939 to DKK 6.8 million in 1944.

=== The international market ===
Interest in Danish Modern in the United States began when Edgar Kaufmann, Jr. from the Museum of Modern Art purchased some items for the Fallingwater home designed by Frank Lloyd Wright. This ultimately led to mass-production in the United States, too. From the beginning of the 1950s, American manufacturers obtained licenses for the mass production of Danish designs while maintaining high standards of craftsmanship. Later, the designs were altered to suit American tastes and American parts were introduced to reduce costs. When Sears and Woolworth's entered the market, the Danes countered by producing new designs based on new materials. One of Wegner's works was used by Richard Nixon and John F. Kennedy in a 1960 televised debate and is now known simply as The Chair.

A largely intact, and comprehensive, example are the buildings of St Catherine's College, Oxford in England. Designed by Arne Jacobsen between 1960 and 1966, the buildings were given the highest Grade I designated status by Historic England in 1993. In addition to the buildings themselves, Jacobsen designed almost all of the furniture, lighting, textiles and metalwork used on the site.

Furniture exports from Denmark rose from DKK 9.8 million in 1953 to DKK 257.8 million in 1964. This was aided in part by Denmark's decision to copy the British 30% devaluation in September 1949, which brought down the price of Danish goods drastically for American consumers.

=== Decline in popularity ===
Sales peaked around 1963, but when American manufacturers introduced molded plastic and wood-grained Formica as cheaper substitutes, they started to decline in favor of Mediterranean designs which became popular in 1966. In addition to changes in style preferences, customers' shopping habits had changed to favor affordable and lower-cost furniture over a single investment that would last their lifetime.

A 1980 New York Times article observed that Danish modern "went out of style" in the United States, due in part to counterculture, "which would have none of the earnest establishment image of Scandinavian design", and the "new culture, for which only the shocking is chic". Many factories closed during this time and the Cabinetmakers' Guild Exhibition held its final event in 1966 after too few cabinetmakers remained in Copenhagen to sustain it.

=== Resurgence of interest ===
In the late 1990s, Danish modern, and the broader mid-century modern movement, experienced a revival in international interest.

While the mass-produced works of Wegner, Juhl and Jacobsen are still in demand, collectors are increasingly turning to limited production items from these and the other designers. In the United States, while prices have increased, they are still at reasonable levels compared to similar items of new furniture. Licensed manufacturers have started reissuing key designs, while others have used Danish Modern for inspiration.

=== The Danish furniture industry today ===
Denmark's 400 furniture companies produce goods worth around DKK 13 billion (€1.75 billion). A highly productive sector, over 80% of the furniture produced is sold abroad making furniture Denmark's fifth most-important export industry. Most of the items produced are for the home, but many are designed for the workplace. Denmark has maintained its place as the world's leading furniture producer in relation to the country's population.

A number of firms continue to be active in producing both classic Danish Modern designs and in introducing variants designed by a new generation of artists. They include Republic of Fritz Hansen, Fredericia Furniture, Carl Hansen & Søn and Normann Copenhagen, all of whom exhibited at the 2011 Salone Internazionale del Mobile in Milan. Other significant producers include PP Møbler, Kjærholm Production and One Collection, formerly known as Hansen & Sørensen.

However, a large amount of Danish furniture is now produced outside of Denmark. Production has been outsourced to aboard where costs are lower, mainly Baltic countries and eastern and southern Europe. Republic of Fritz Hansen, for example, has moved their production to Poland. New types of Danish design companies have emerged with both national and international appeal in recent years. Normann Copenhagen, HAY, Muuto, Kähler are among new firms that carry Danish modern design principles forward.

Innovative design work is also encouraged by the Wilhelm Hansen Foundation with the annual Finn Juhl Prize which is awarded to designers, manufacturers or writers who have made a special contribution to the field of furniture design, especially chairs.

== Main contributors ==
Kaare Klint (1888—1954)

As a result of the furniture school he founded at the Royal Academy in 1924, Klint had an impact on Danish furniture, influencing designers such as Kjærholm and Mogensen. His carefully researched designs are based on functionality, proportions in line with the human body, craftsmanship and the use of high quality materials. Notable examples of his work include the Propeller Stool (1927), the Safari Chair and the Deck Chair (both 1933), and the Church Chair (1936).

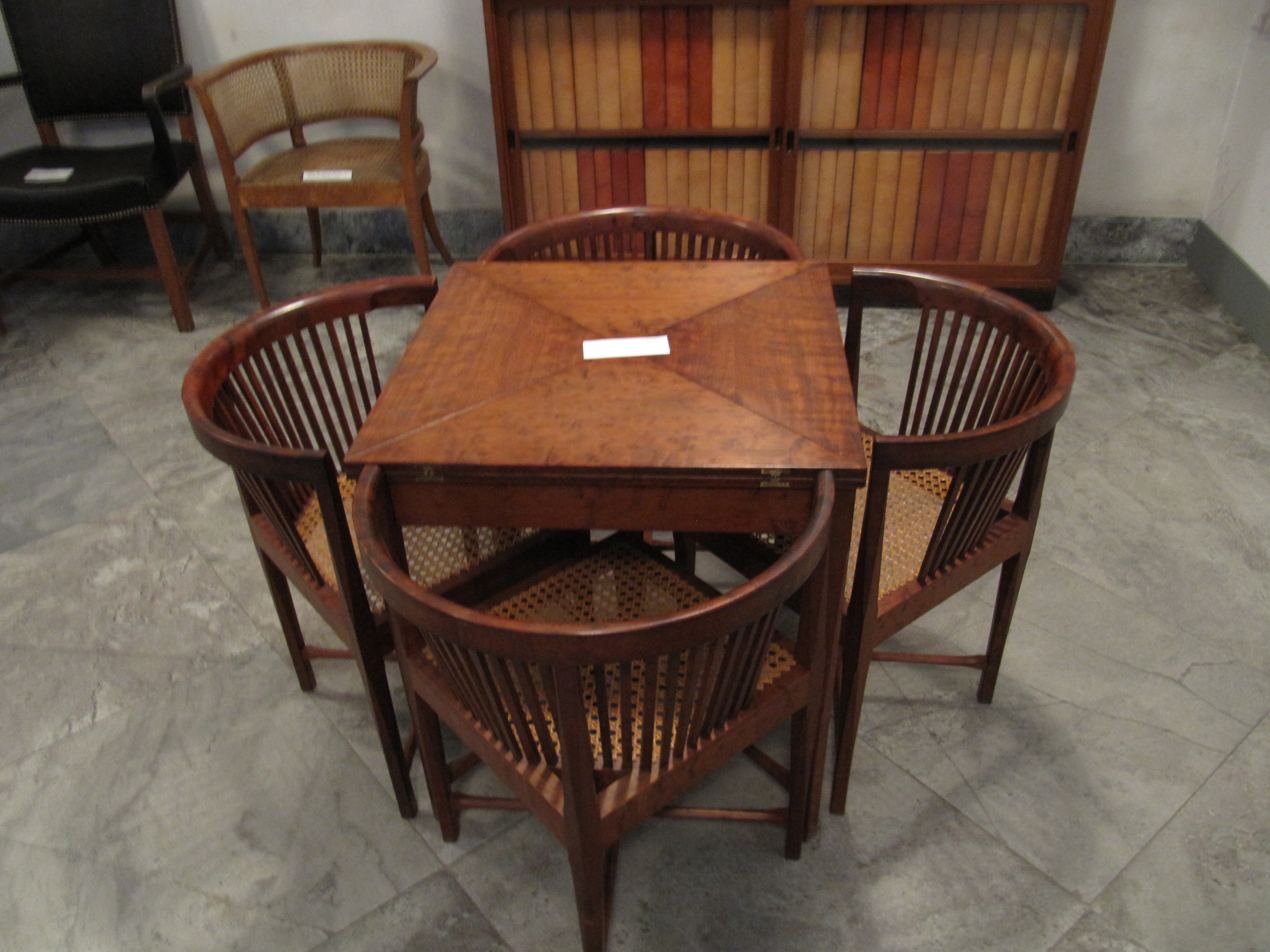
Table and chairs, Danish Design Museum

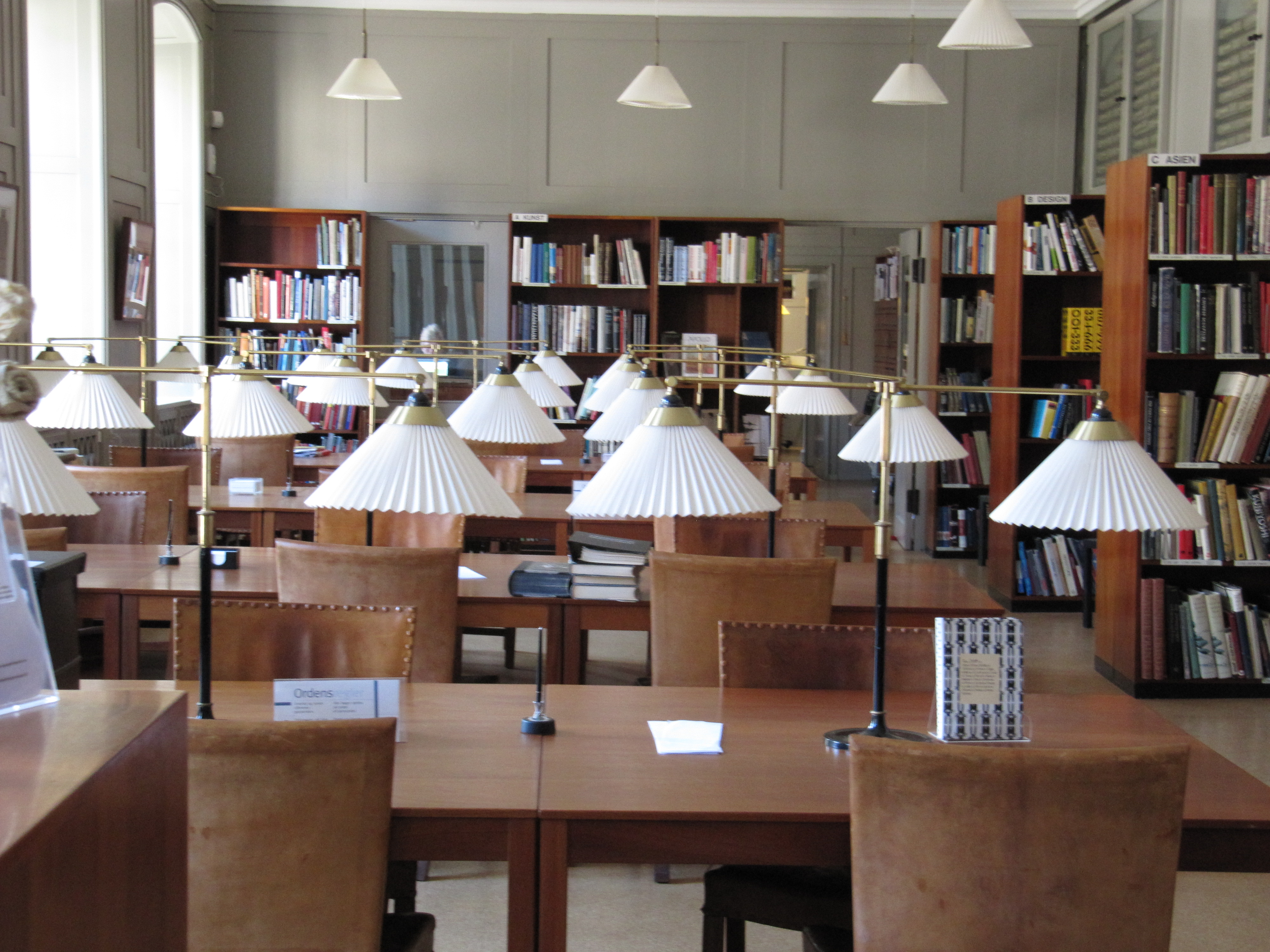
Library at the Danish Design Museum

Poul Henningsen (1894–1967)

Poul Henningsen, an architect, with a strong belief in the functionalist way of thinking, was an important participant in the Danish Modern school, not for furniture but for lighting design. His attempt to prevent the blinding glare from the electric lamp bulb succeeded in 1926 with a three-shade lamp, known as the PH lamp. The curvature of the shades allowed his hanging lamp to illuminate both the table and the rest of the room. He went on to design many similar lamps, some with frosted glass, including desk lamps, chandeliers and wall-mounted fixtures. Although he died in 1967, many of his designs continue to be popular.

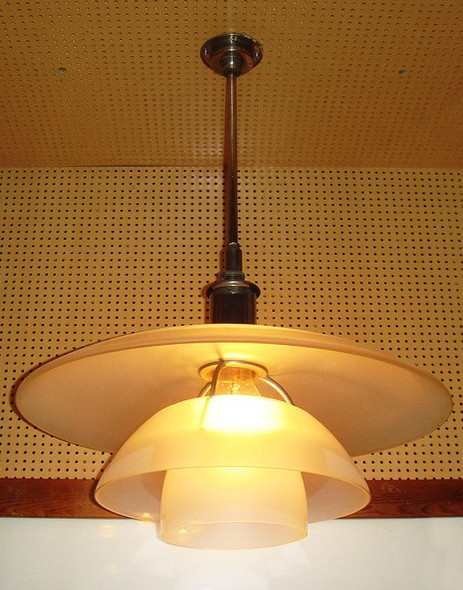
PH Lamp (1925) variation with frosted glass

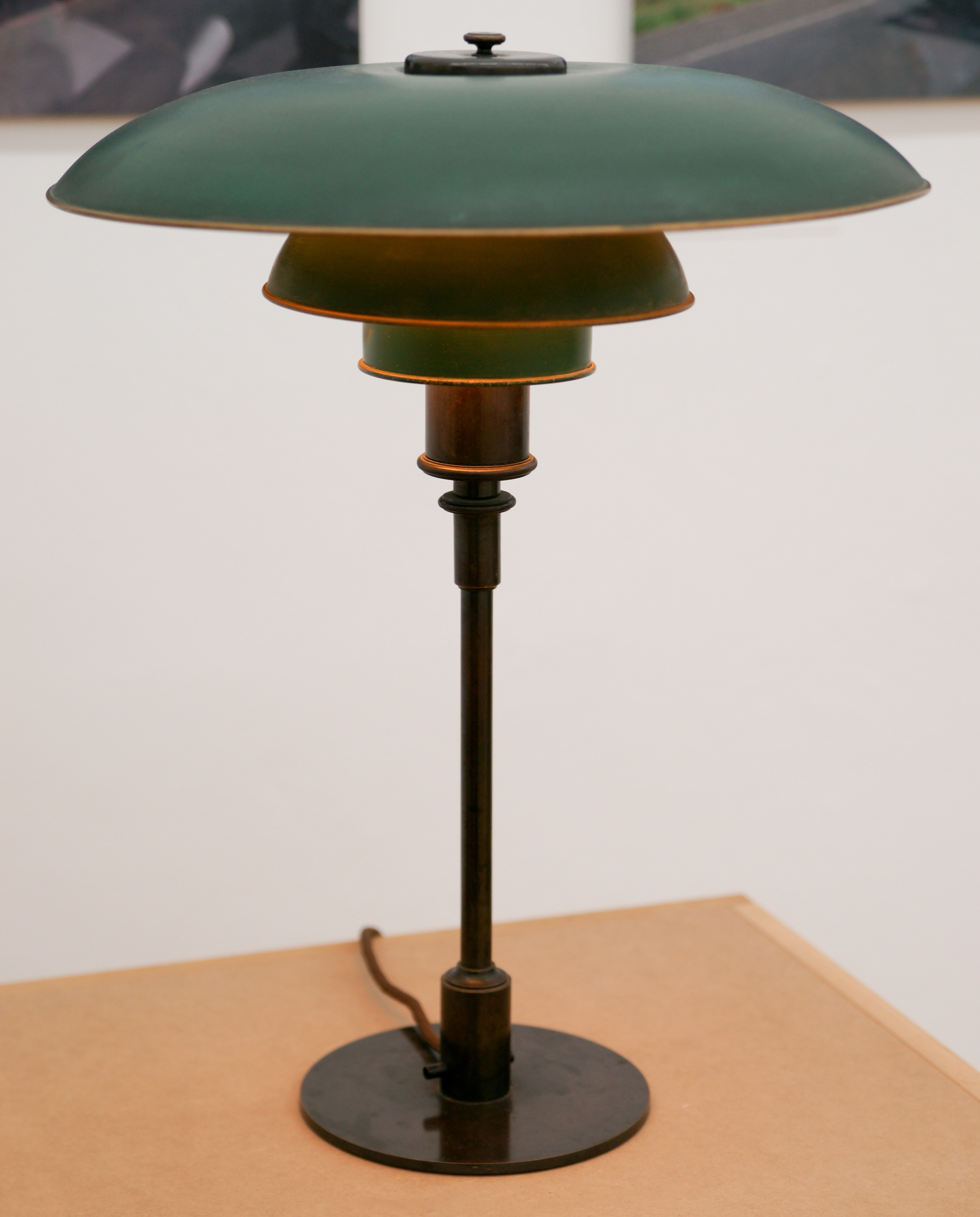
PH desk lamp (1941)

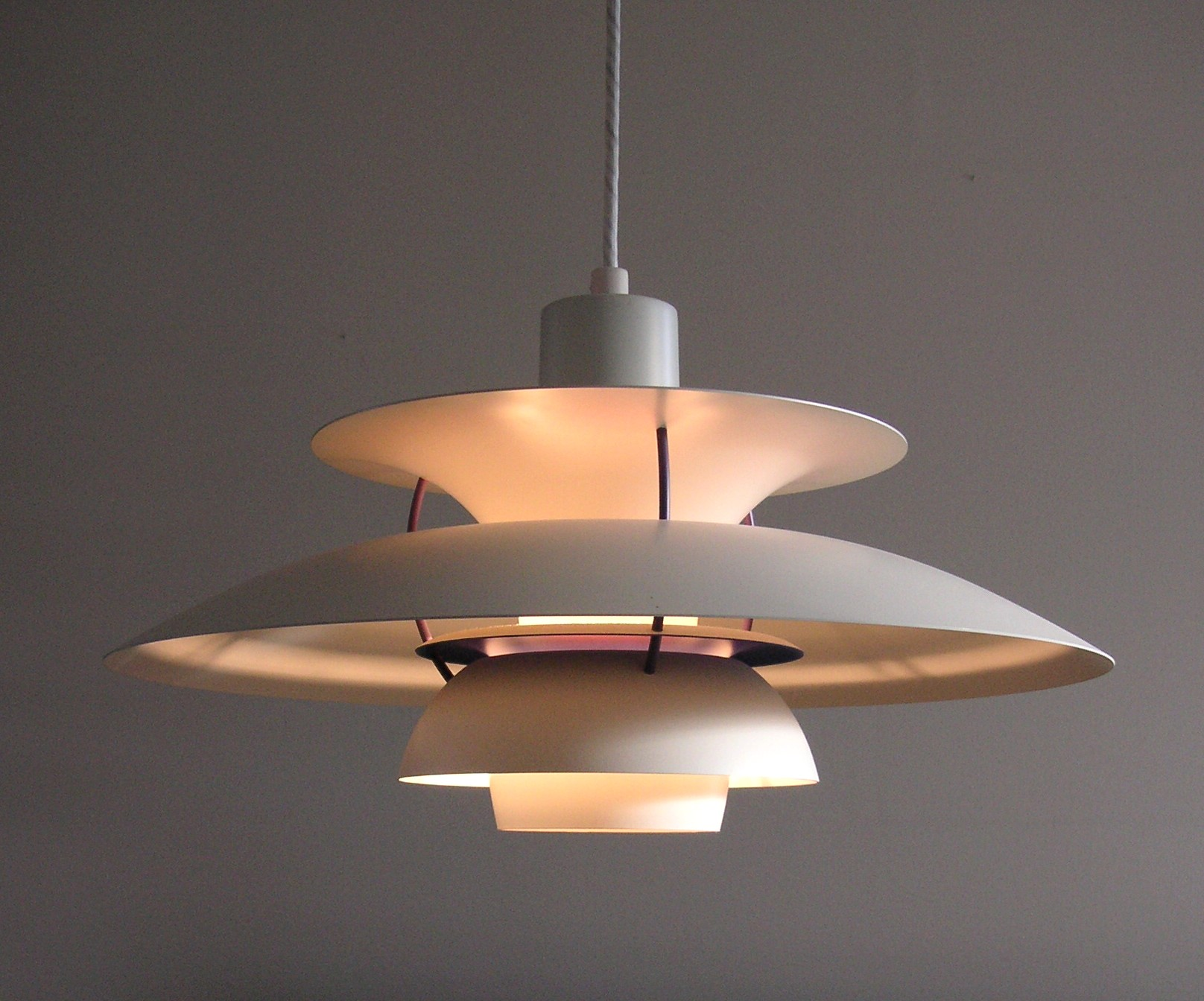
The PH5 Lamp (1958)

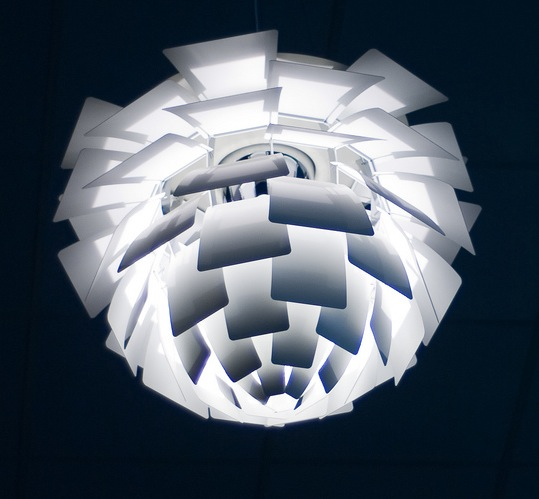
The PH Artichoke

Mogens Lassen (1901–1987)

In addition to his architectural work, Lassen was also a keen furniture designer. Influenced both by Le Corbusier and Ludwig Mies van der Rohe, he developed a unique approach to Functionalism. As a result of his fine craftsmanship and his search for simplicity, his steel-based furniture from the 1930s added a new dimension to the modernist movement. His later designs in wood still form part of classical Danish Modern, especially his three-legged stool and folding Egyptian coffee table (1940) originally produced by A. J. Iversen.

Arne Jacobsen (1902–1971)

Graduating from the Royal Academy in 1924, Jacobsen quickly demonstrated his mastery of both architecture and furniture design. With the completion of his Royal Hotel in Copenhagen and all its internal fittings and furniture in 1960, his talents became widely recognized, especially as a result of the chairs called the Egg chair and the Swan, now international icons. His stackable, three-legged Ant Chair (1952) with a one-piece plywood seat and back and its four-legged counterpart, the Model 3107 chair (1955), were particularly popular with worldwide sales in the millions.

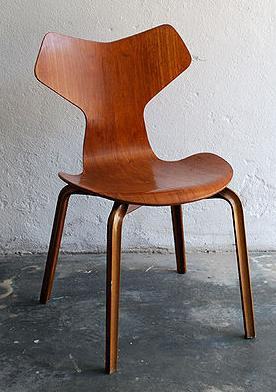
Wooden-legged Grand Prix Chair (1957)

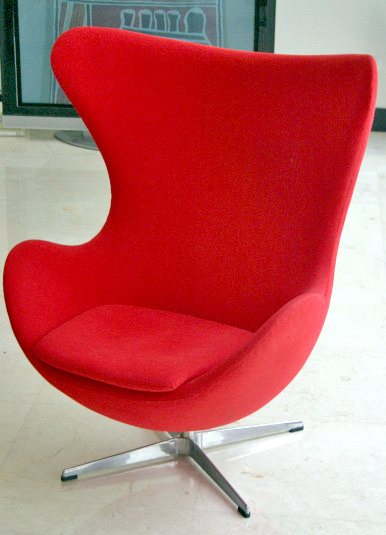
The Egg (1958)

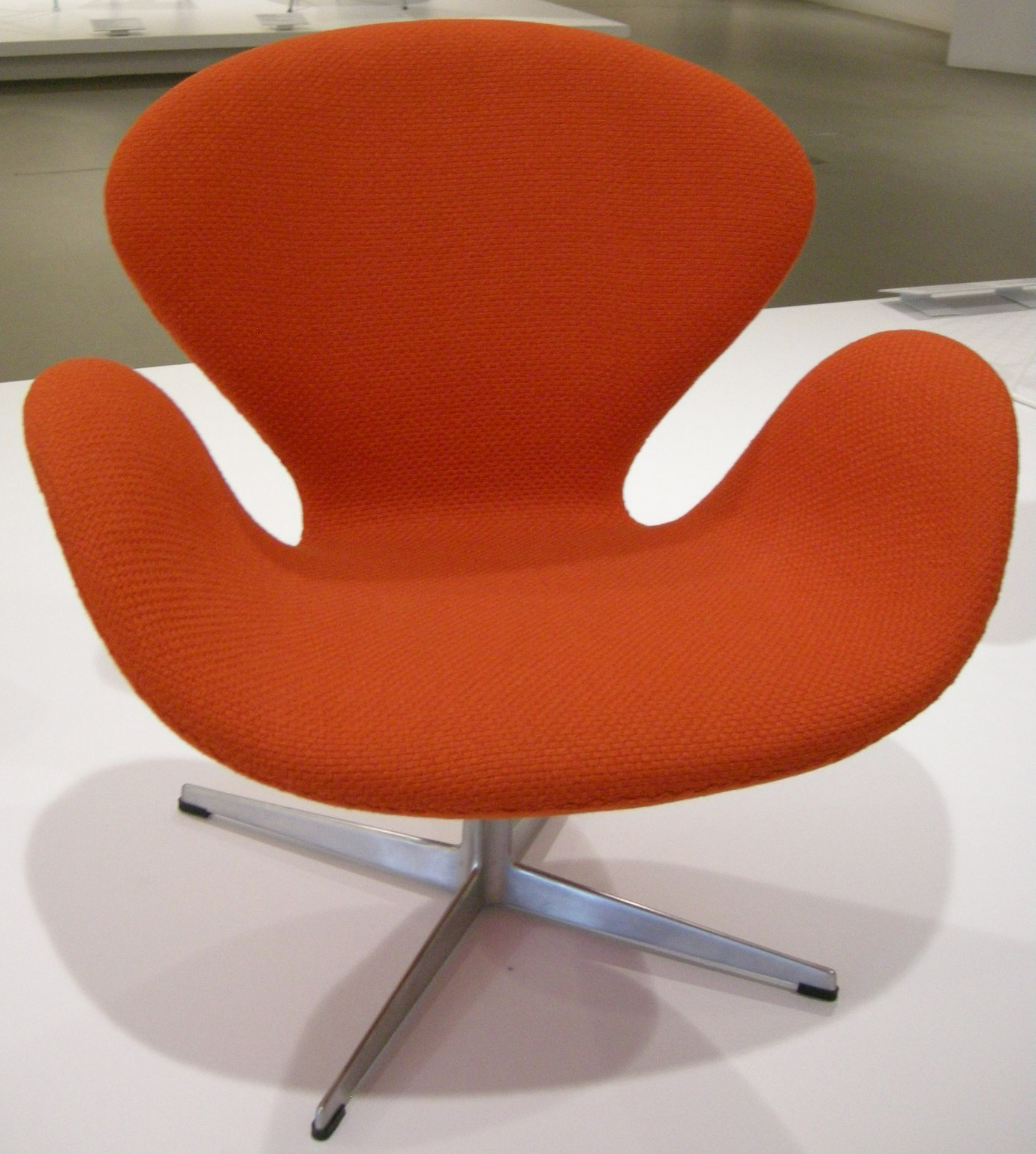
The Swan (1958)

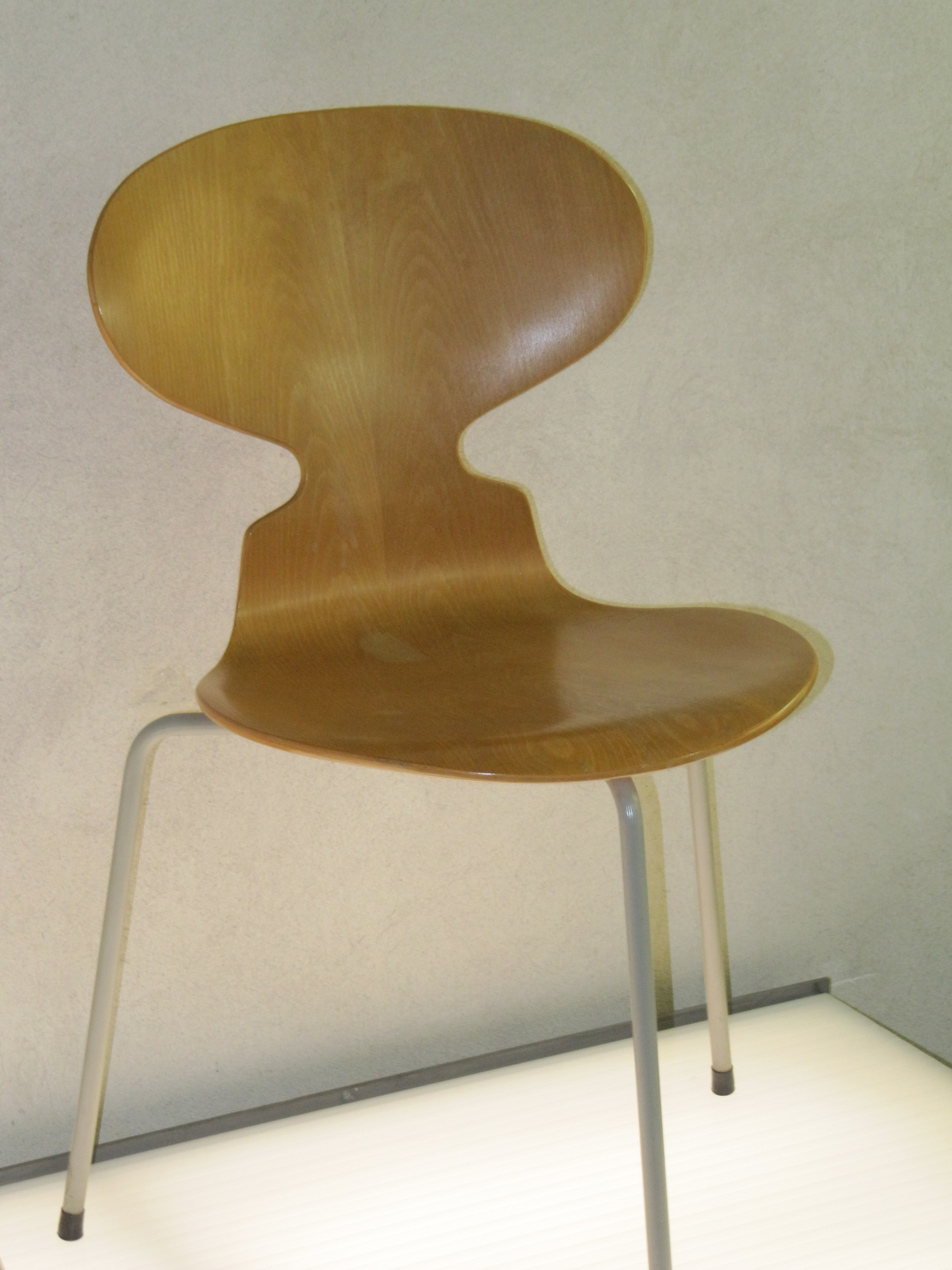
Three-legged Ant Chair (1952)

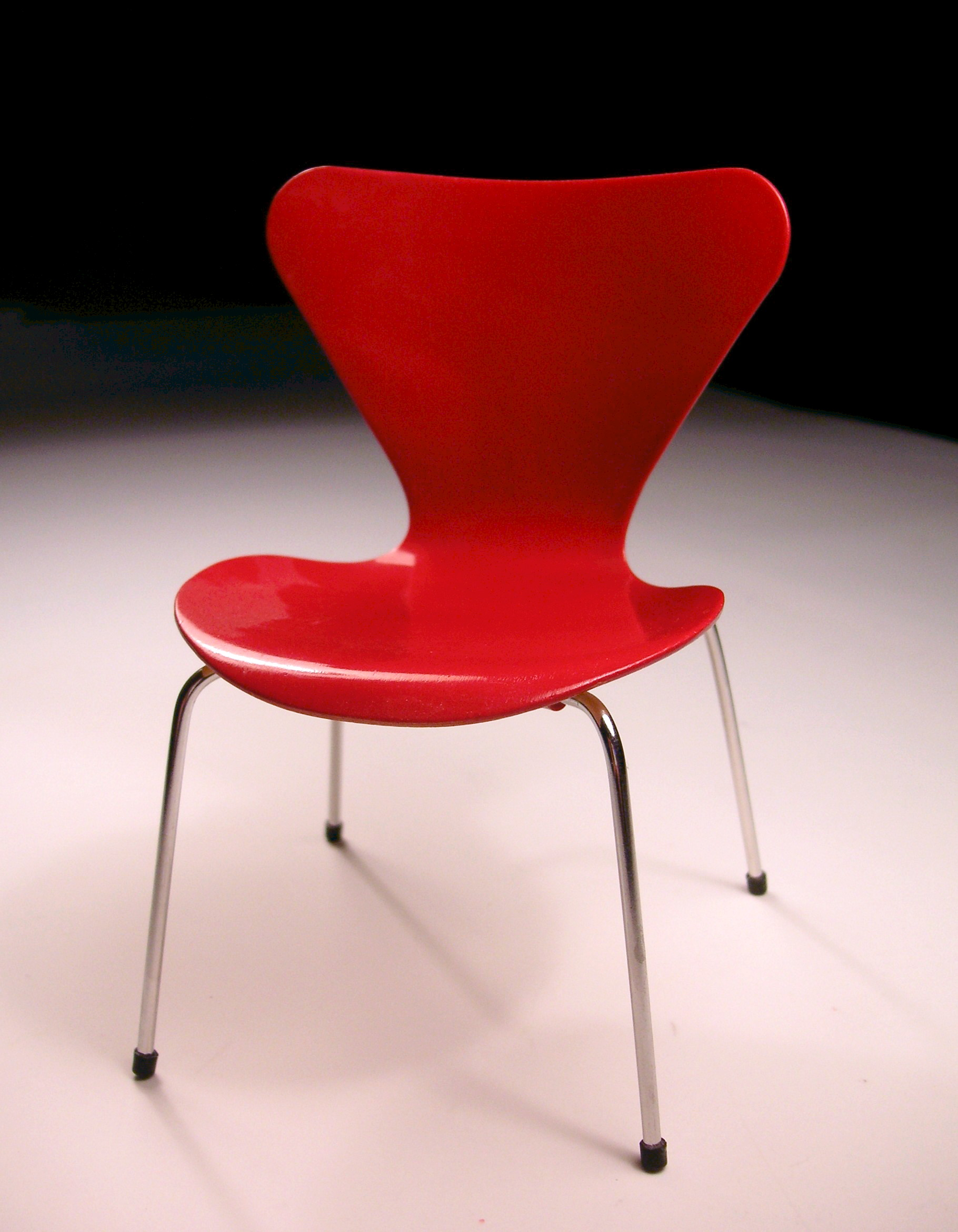
The 7 Chair (1955)

Ole Wanscher (1903–1985)

Inspired by Kaare Klint under whom he had studied, Wanscher later followed in his footsteps as professor of the Royal Academy's furniture school. Particularly interested in 18th-century English furniture and in early Egyptian furniture, one of his most successful pieces was his delicately designed Egyptian Stool (1960) crafted from luxurious materials. Another successful item was his Colonial Chair in Brazilian rosewood. He was awarded the Grand Prix for furniture at Milan's triennale in 1960.

Finn Juhl (1912–1989)

An architect by training, Juhl graduated from the Royal Academy and spent 10 years in the profession before becoming a self-taught designer of furniture. In the late 1930s, he created furniture for himself but from 1945 he became recognized for his expressively sculptural designs, going beyond the Klint school to emphasize integrating form with function. His successful interior design work at the United Nations Headquarters in New York spread the notion of Danish Modern far and wide, paving the way for the international participation of his Danish colleagues. Two key pieces of furniture, in which the seat and backrest are separated from the wooden frame, are his 45-Chair, with its elegant armrests, and his Chieftain Chair (1949). Finn Juhl's home in Charlottenlund, just north of Copenhagen, has been preserved as he left it with the furniture he designed.

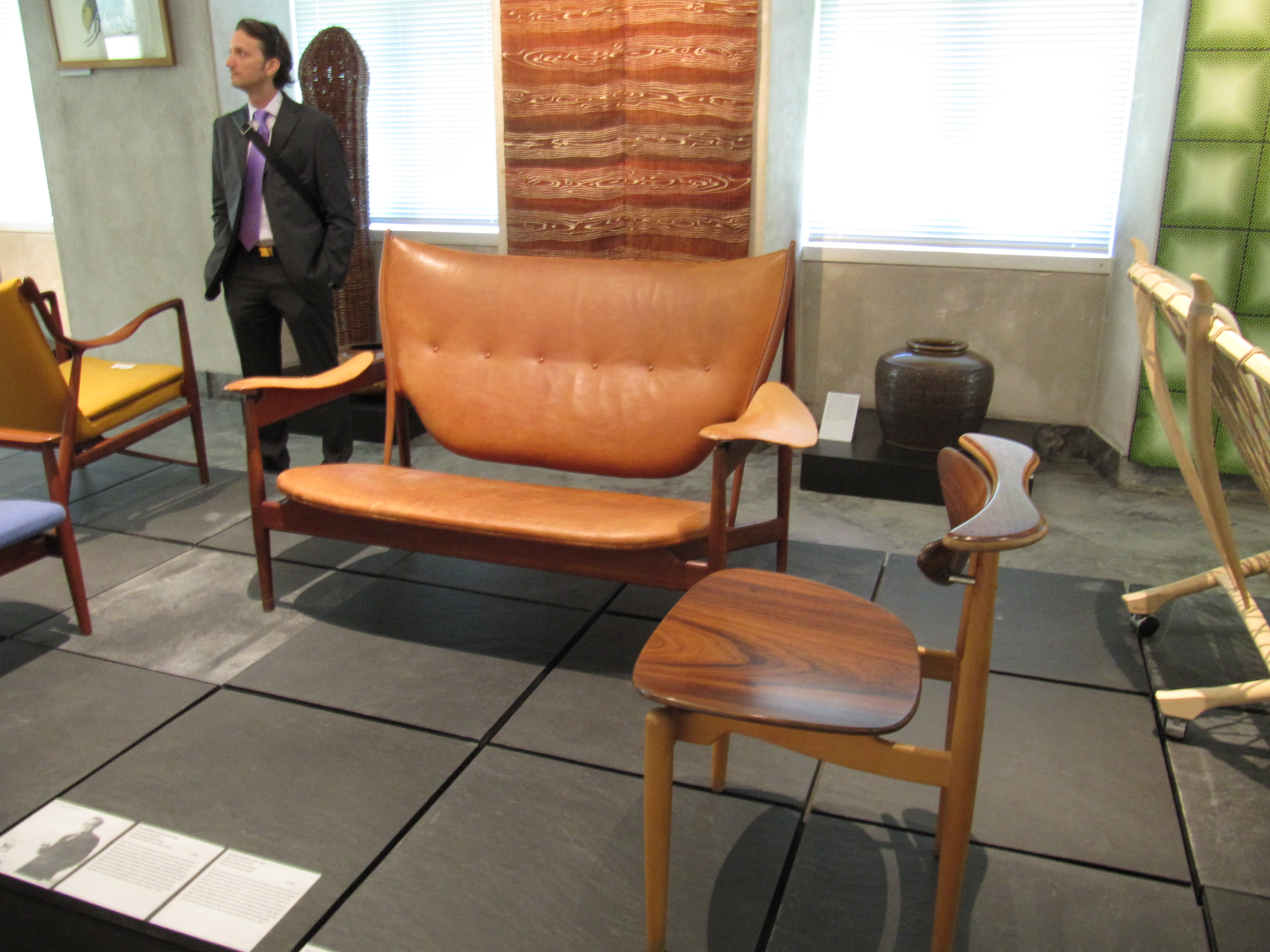
Finn Juhl furniture at the Danish Design Museum

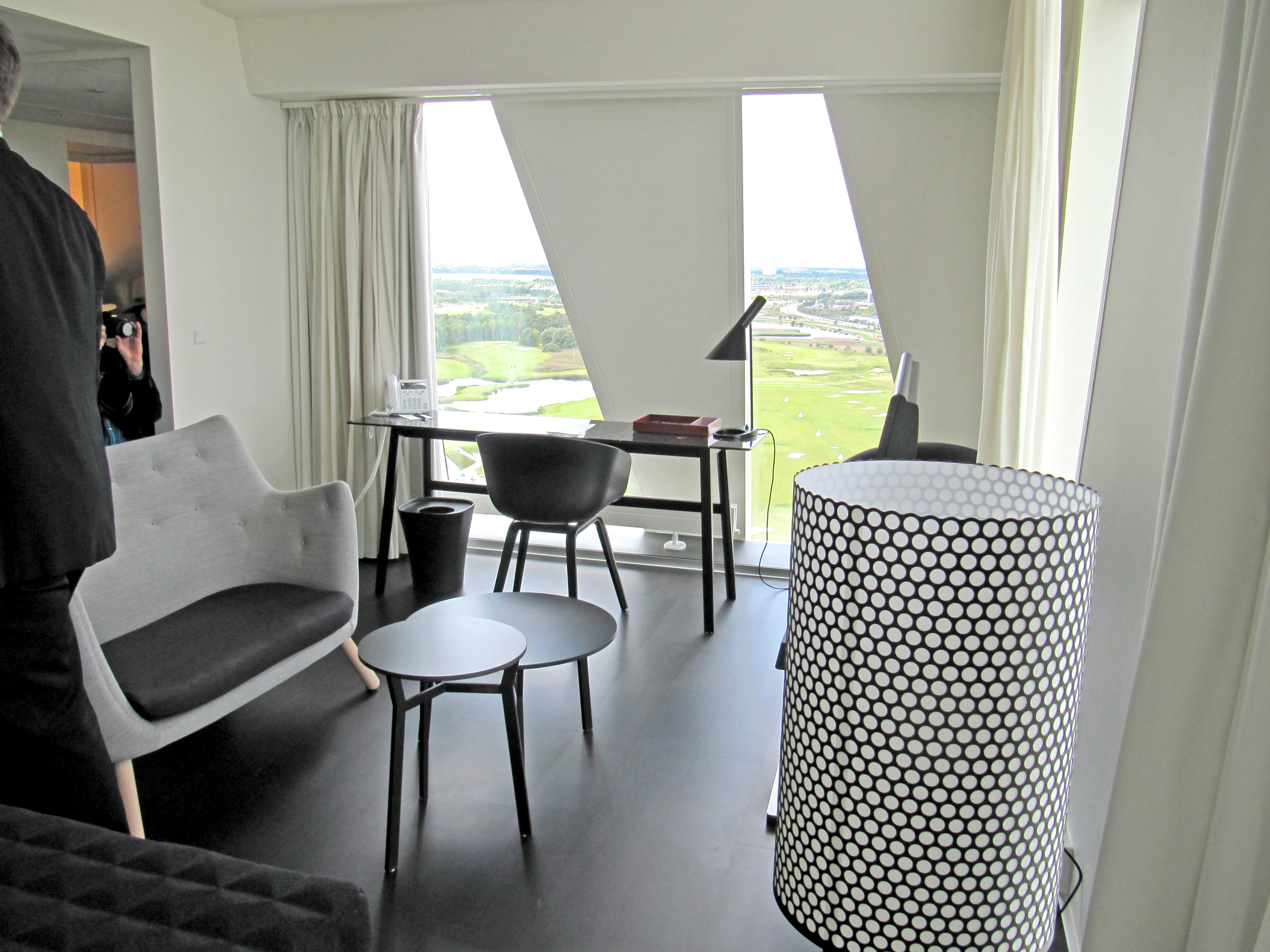
Poet Sofa in room at Copenhagen's Bella Sky Hotel

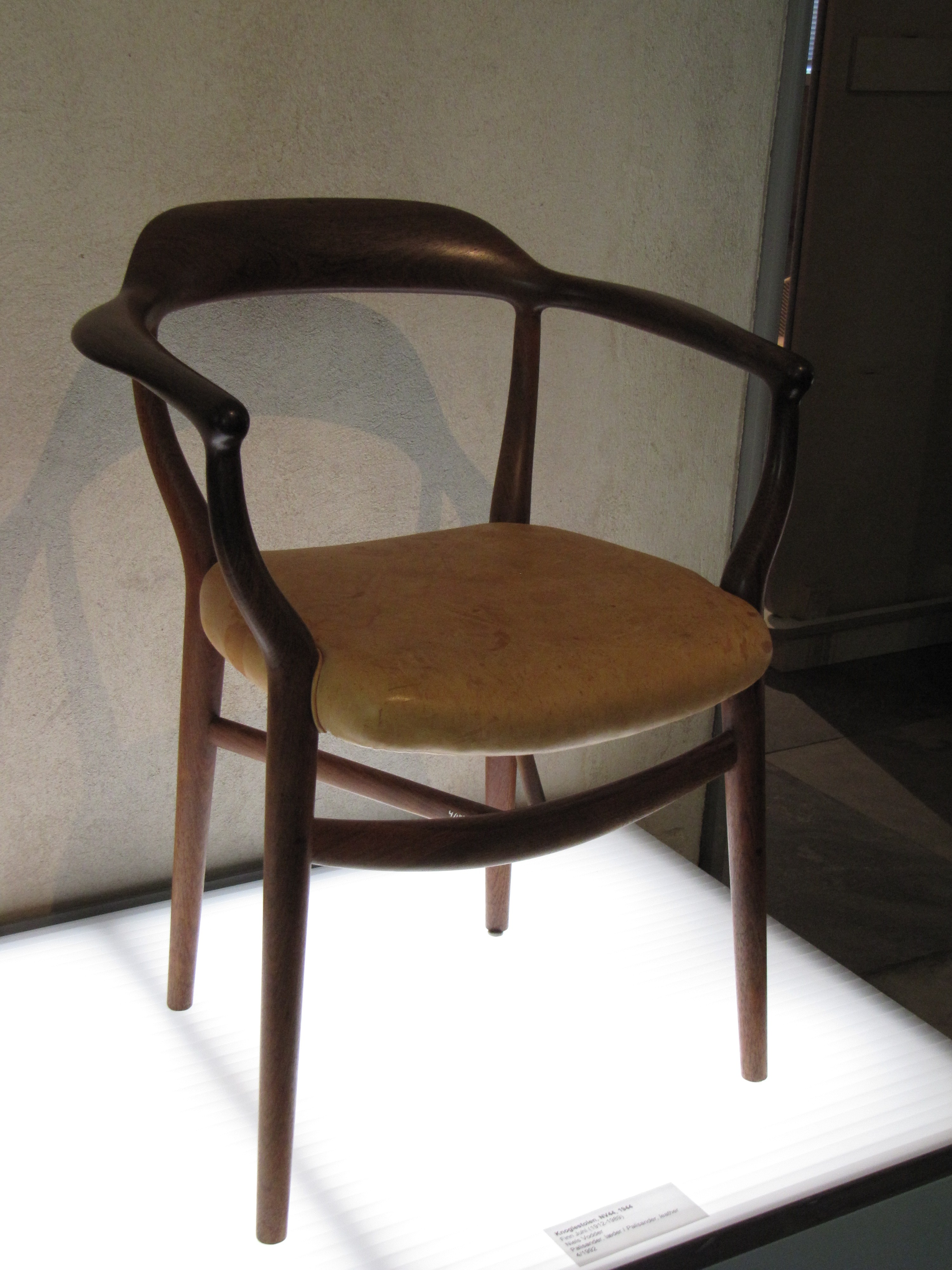
Chair in Design Museum Danmark

Børge Mogensen (1914–1972)

After studying under Kaare Klint at the Copenhagen School of Arts and Crafts and at the Royal Danish Academy of Fine Arts, Mogensen adopted Klint's approach to simple, functional furniture design. Taking an almost scientific approach to an item's functionality, most of his furniture is characterized by strong, simple lines and was designed for industrial production. Notable items include his oak-framed Hunting Chair (1950) with a strong leather back and seat, his light, open Spokeback Sofa (1945), and the low robust Spanish Chair (1959).

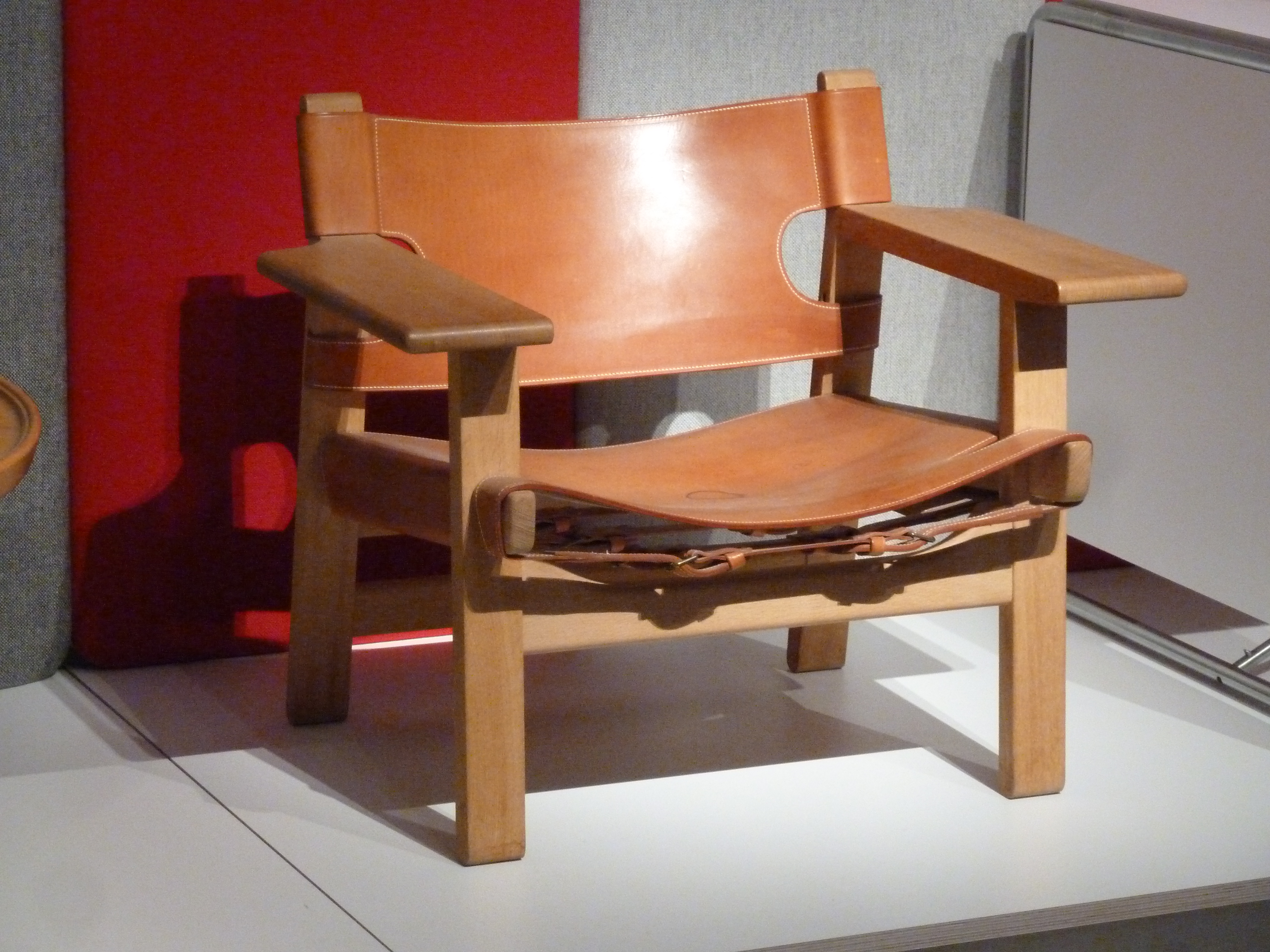
Spanish Chair (1959)

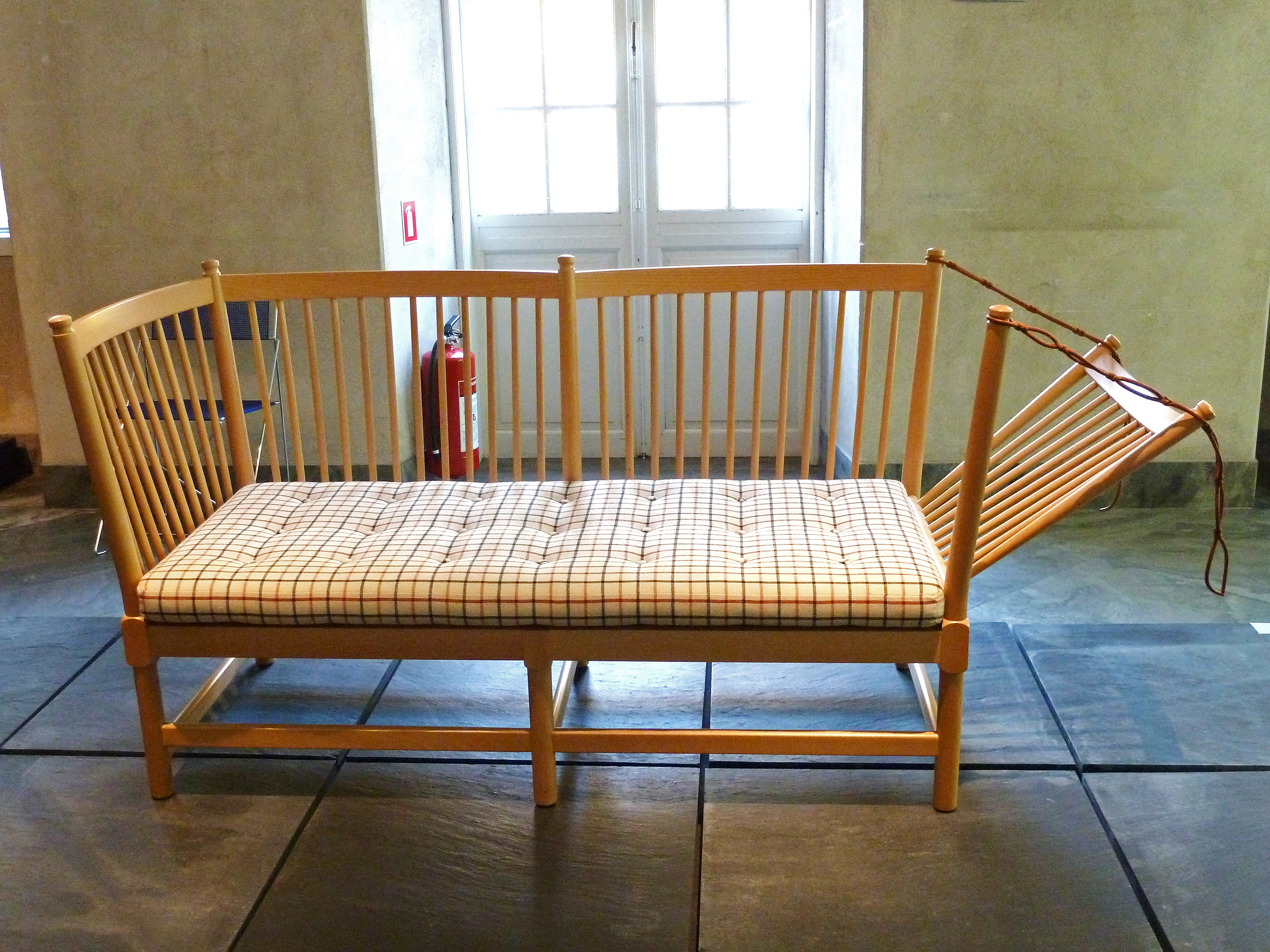
Spokeback Sofa (1945)

Hans Wegner (1914–2007)

Best known as ‘the Master of the Chairs,' Wegner created fascinating furniture with clean, organic and aesthetic lines, balanced by a minimalist and composed aspect. He was a modernist with emphasis on the practicality and elegance of each piece he crafted. He believed the versatility and usability of his designs were as vital for him as the looks of them. After graduating in architecture in 1938, he worked in Arne Jacobsen and Eric Møller's office before establishing his own office in 1943. Striving for functionality as well as beauty, he became the most prolific Danish designer, producing over 500 different chairs. His Round Chair (technically Model 500) in 1949 was called "the world's most beautiful chair" before being labelled simply "The Chair" after Nixon and Kennedy used it in a 1960 televised debate. His Wishbone Chair, also 1949, with a Y-shaped back split and a curved back, was inspired by a Chinese child's chair he had seen. A work of simplicity and comfort, it is still made today by the Danish firm Carl Hansen & Son. Wegner's designs can now be found in several of the world's top design museums including New York's Museum of Modern Art.

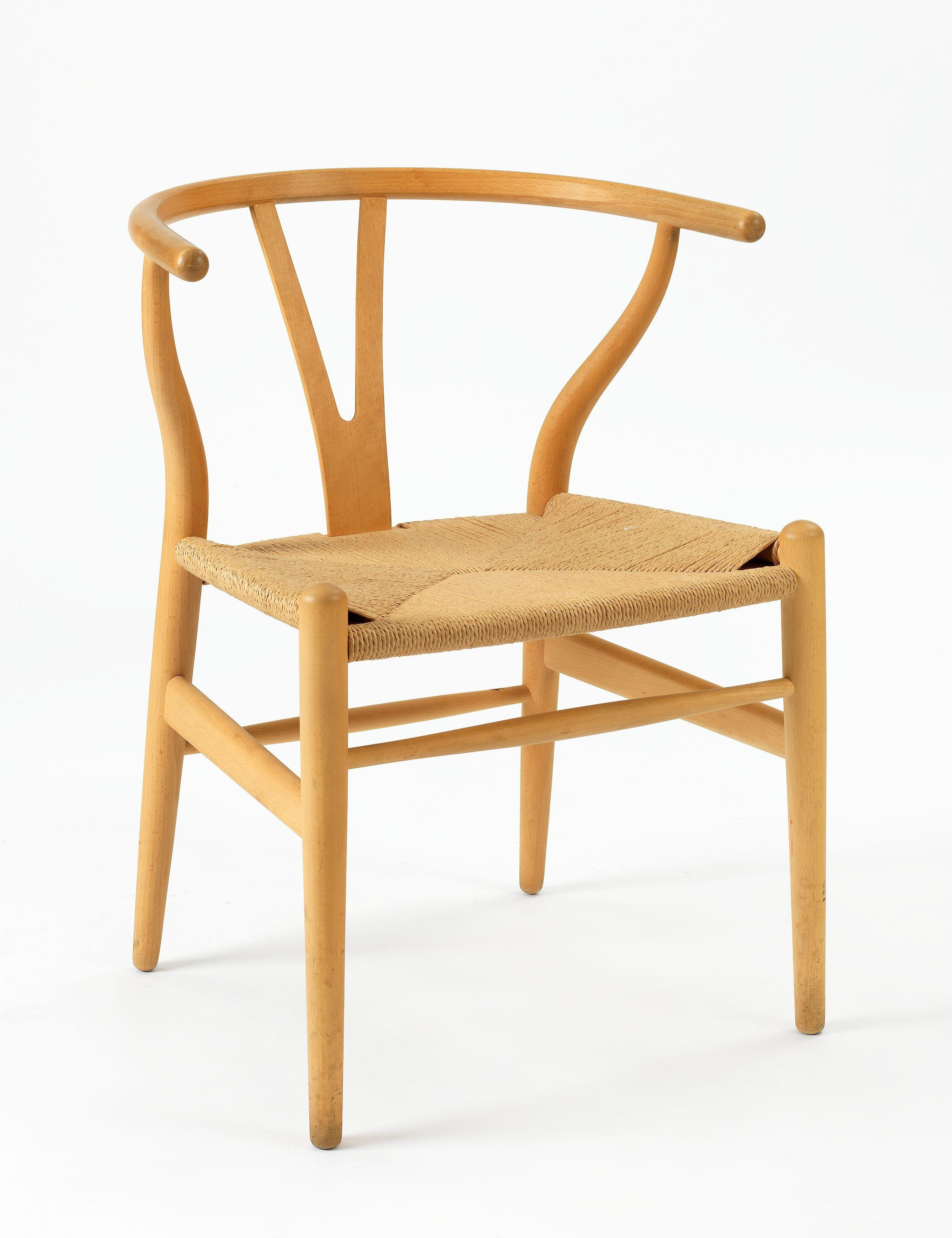
The Wishbone Chair (1949)

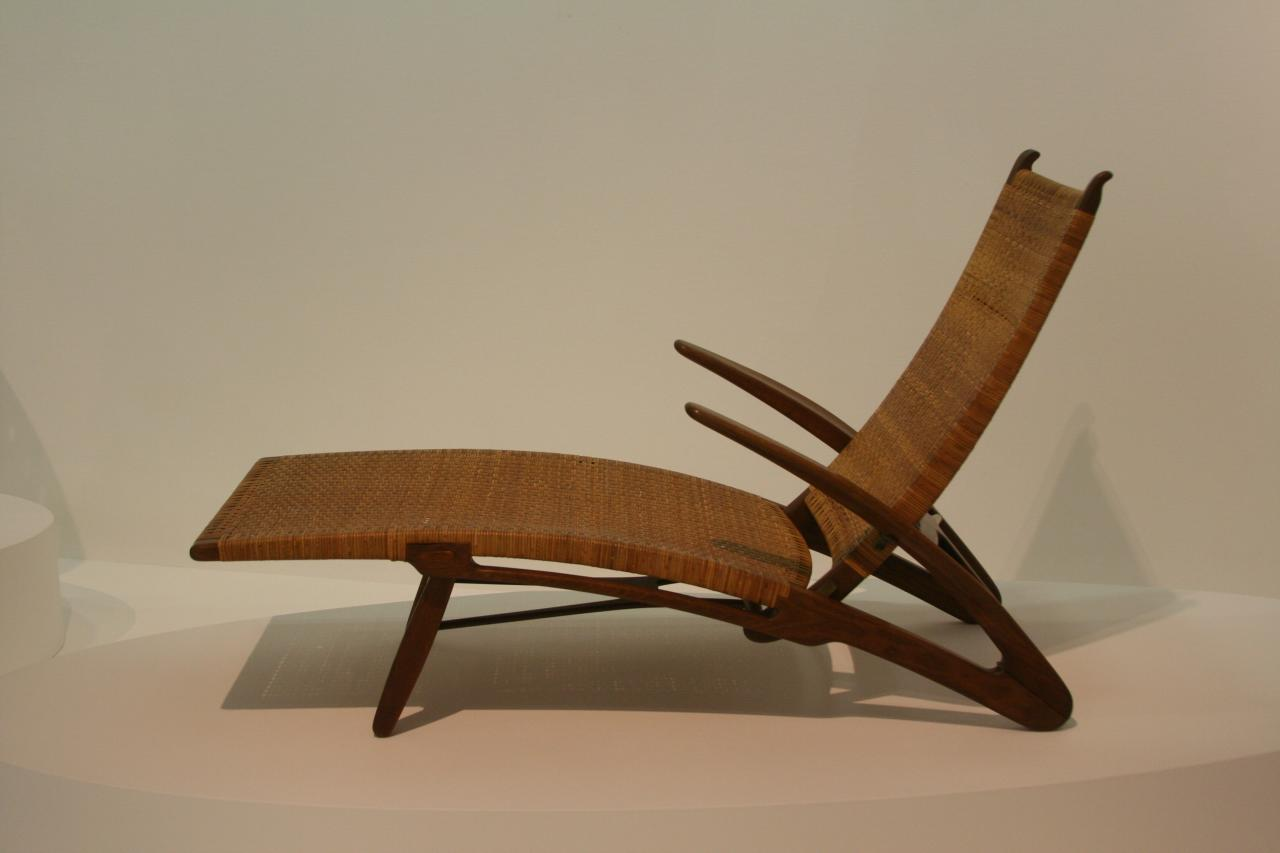
Hans Wegner chair, Centre Pompidou, Paris

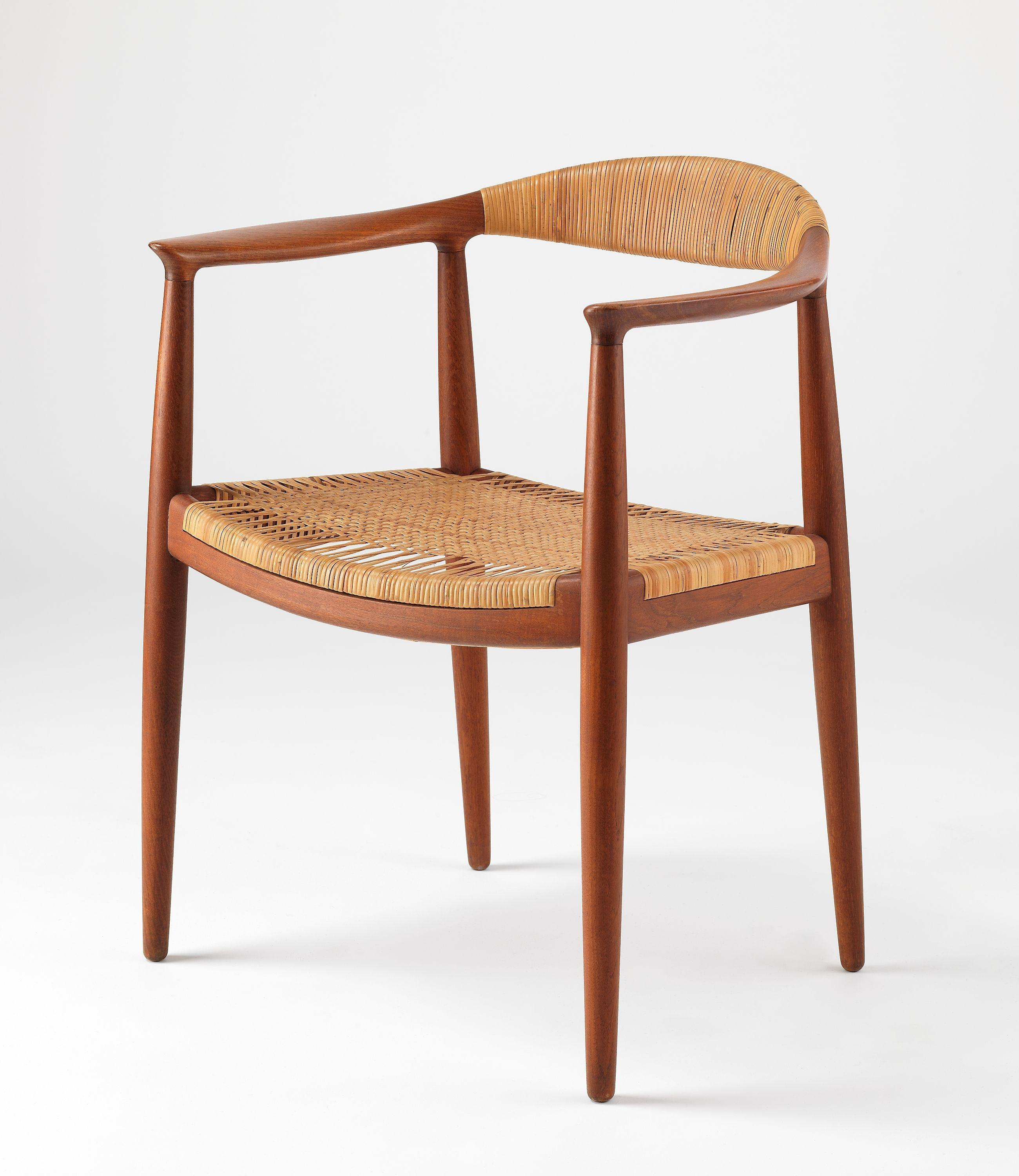
The Round Chair (1949)

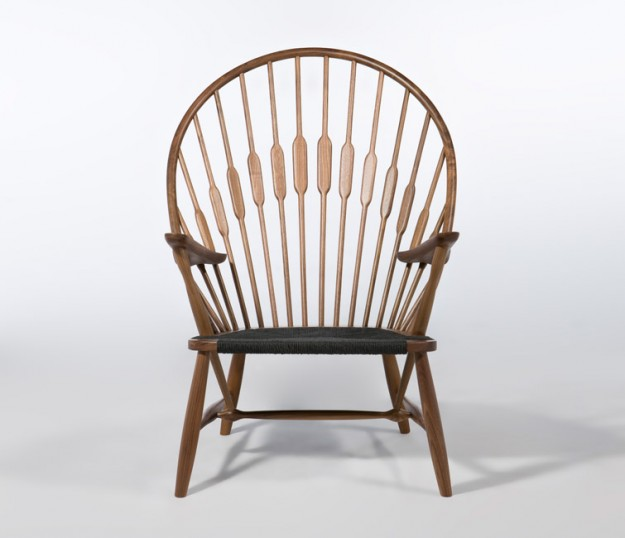
The Peacock Chair

Grete Jalk (1920–2006)

After training as a cabinetmaker, she studied at the Danish Design School in 1946, while receiving additional instruction from Kaare Klint at the Royal Academy's Furniture School. Inspired by Alvar Aalto's laminated bent-plywood furniture and Charles Eames' moulded plywood designs, she began to develop her own boldly curved models in the 1950s. In 1963, she won a Daily Mirror competition with her "He Chair" and "She Chair". With the help of furniture manufacturer Poul Jeppesen, she went on to design simpler models with clear, comfortable lines, which became popular both in Denmark and the United States thanks to their competitive prices. Jalk also edited the Danish design magazine Mobilia and compiled an authoritative four-volume work on Danish furniture.

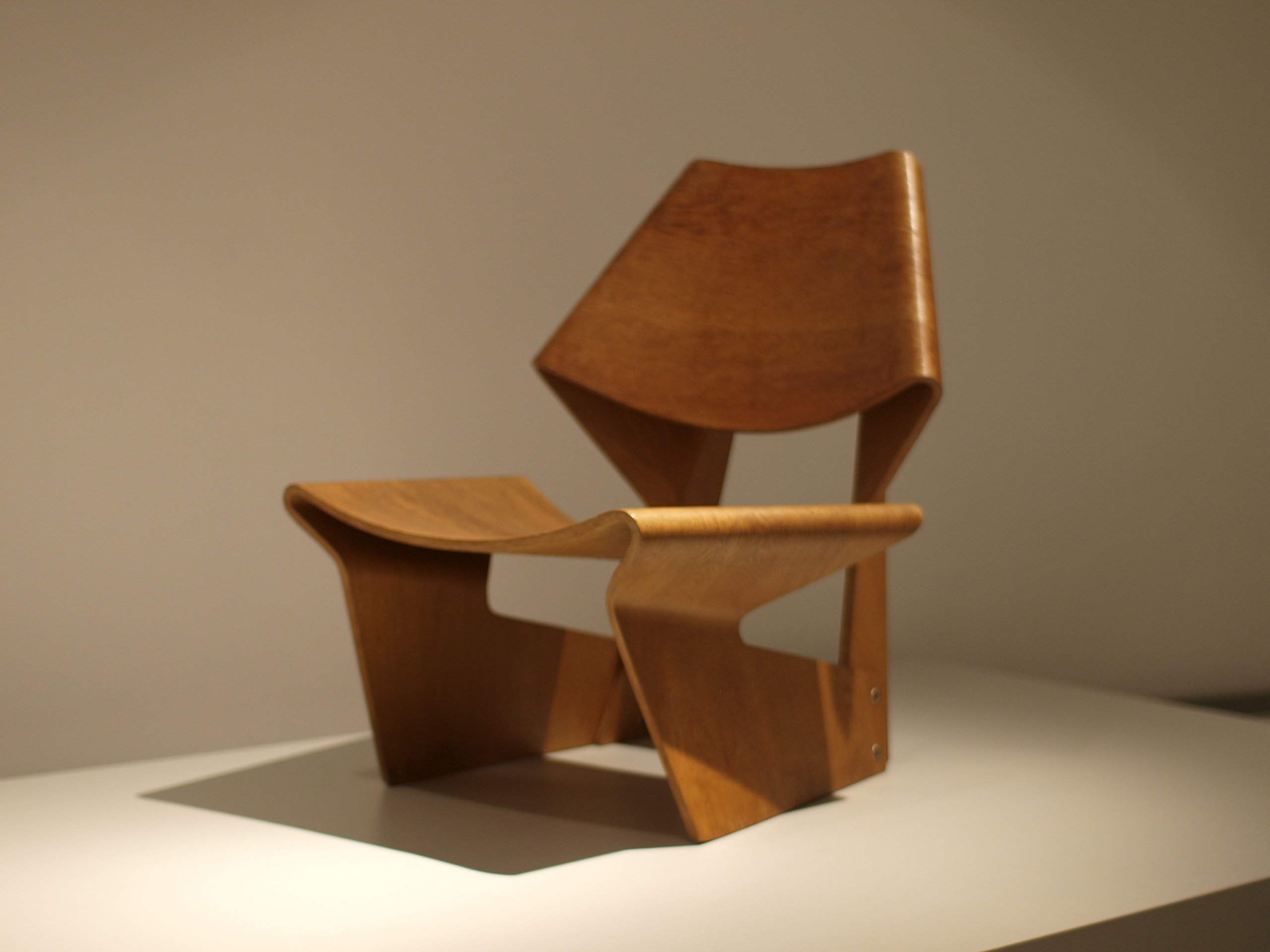
Grete Jalk: plywood GJ Chair (1963)

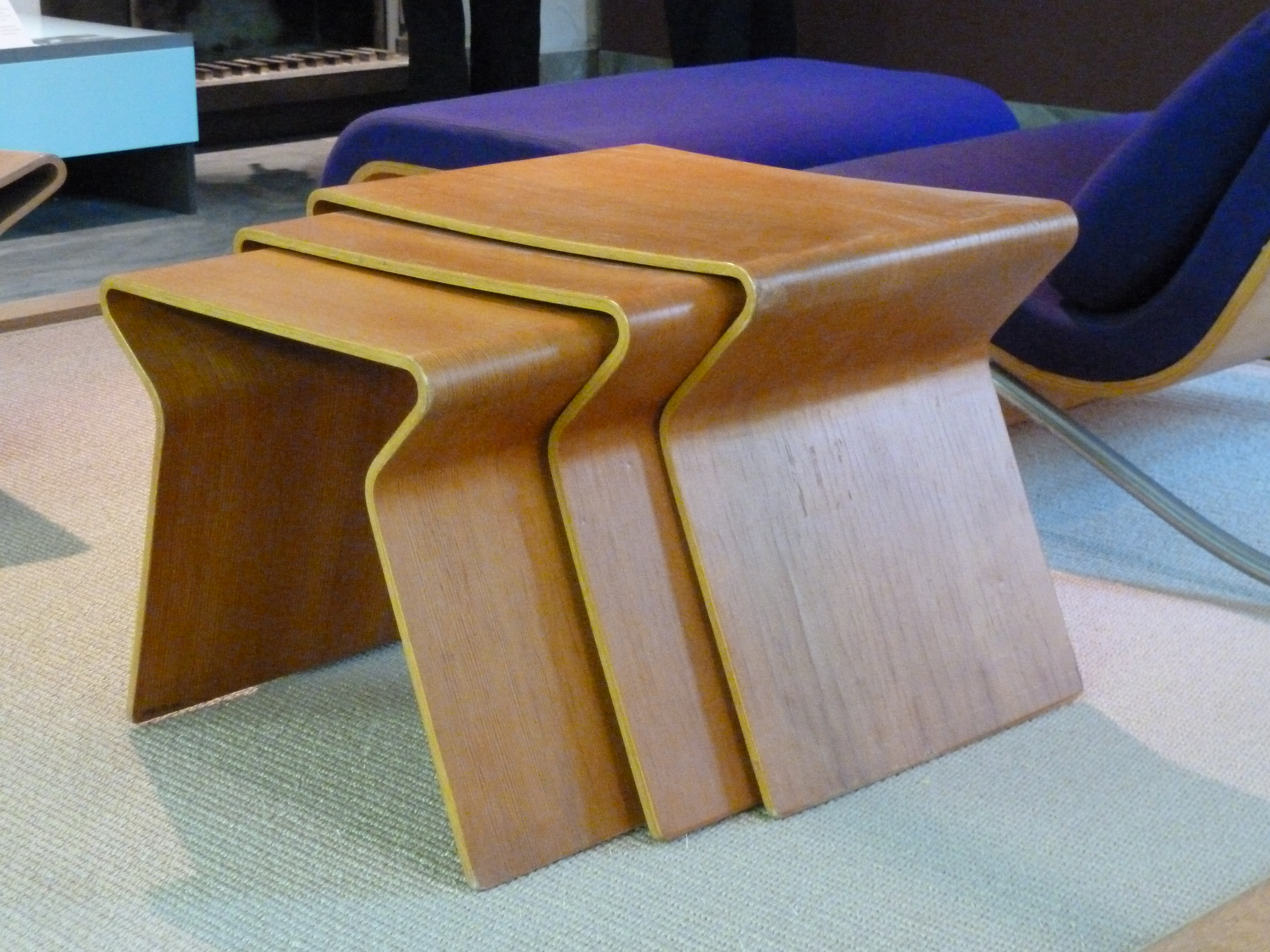
Grete Jalk's GJ Table (1963)

Verner Panton (1926–1998)

On graduating from the Royal Academy in 1951, Panton worked briefly with Arne Jacobsen. During the 1960s, he designed furniture, lamps and textiles with an imaginative combination of innovative materials, playful shapes and bold colours. Among his earliest designs were the Bachelor Chair and Tivoli Chair (1955), both produced by Fritz Hansen, but he is remembered above all for his Panton Chair (1960), the world's first one-piece moulded plastic chair. Sometimes referred to as a pop artist, unlike the majority of his colleagues, he continued to be successful in the 1970s, not only with furniture but with interior designs including lighting.

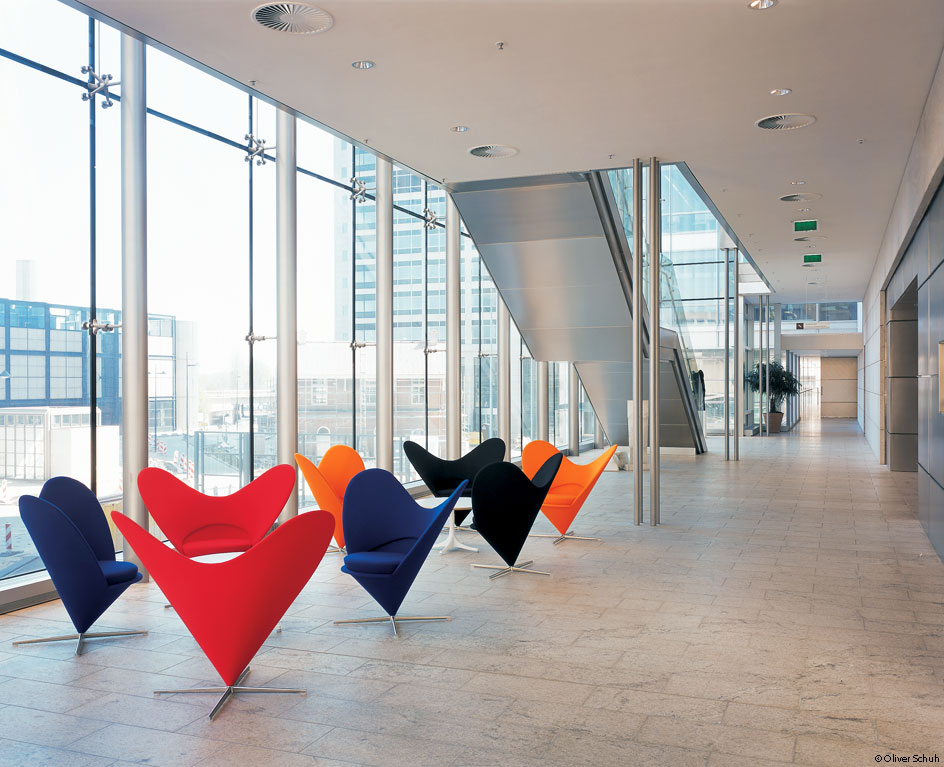
Heart Cone chairs (1959)

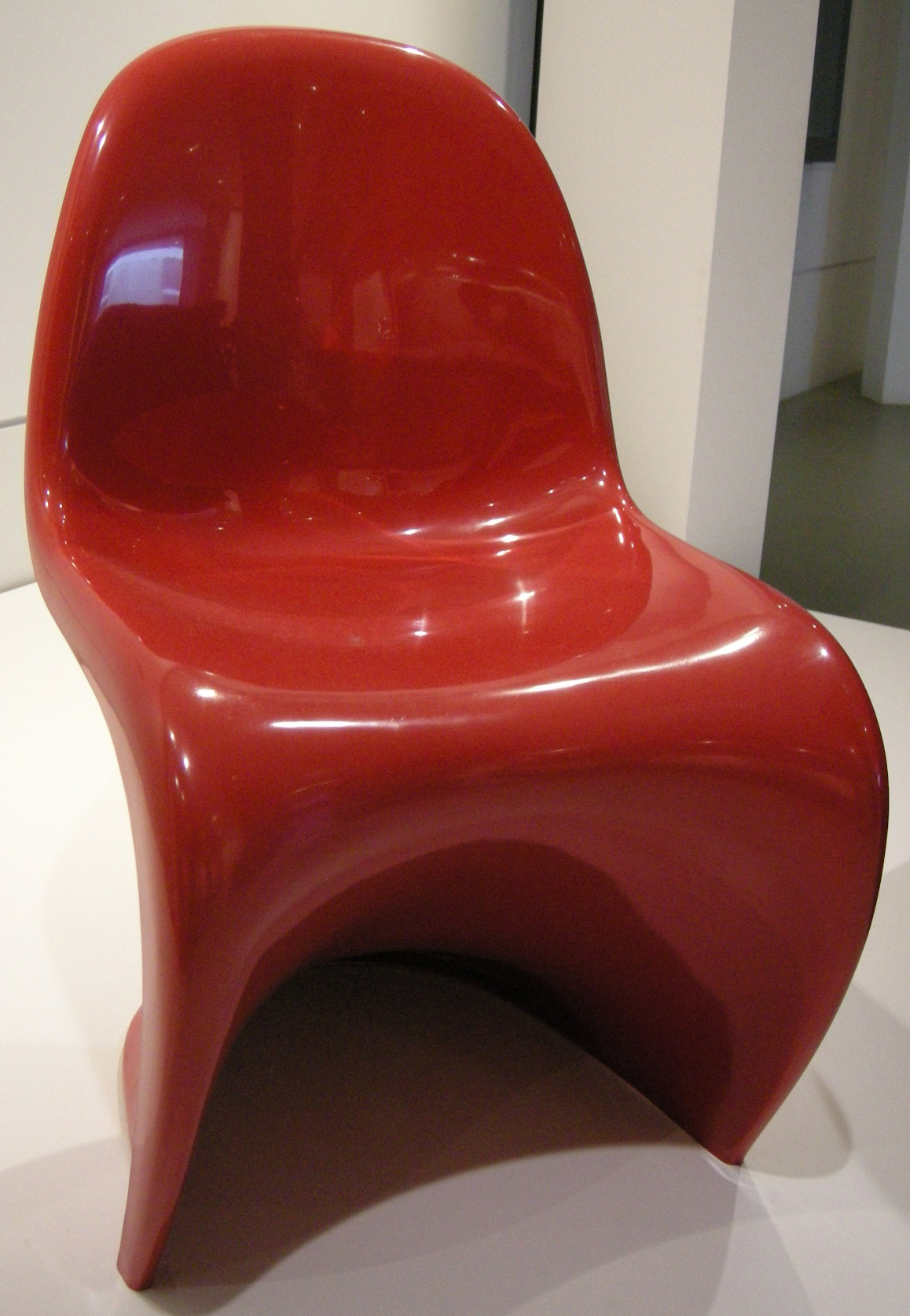
Panton Chair (1960)

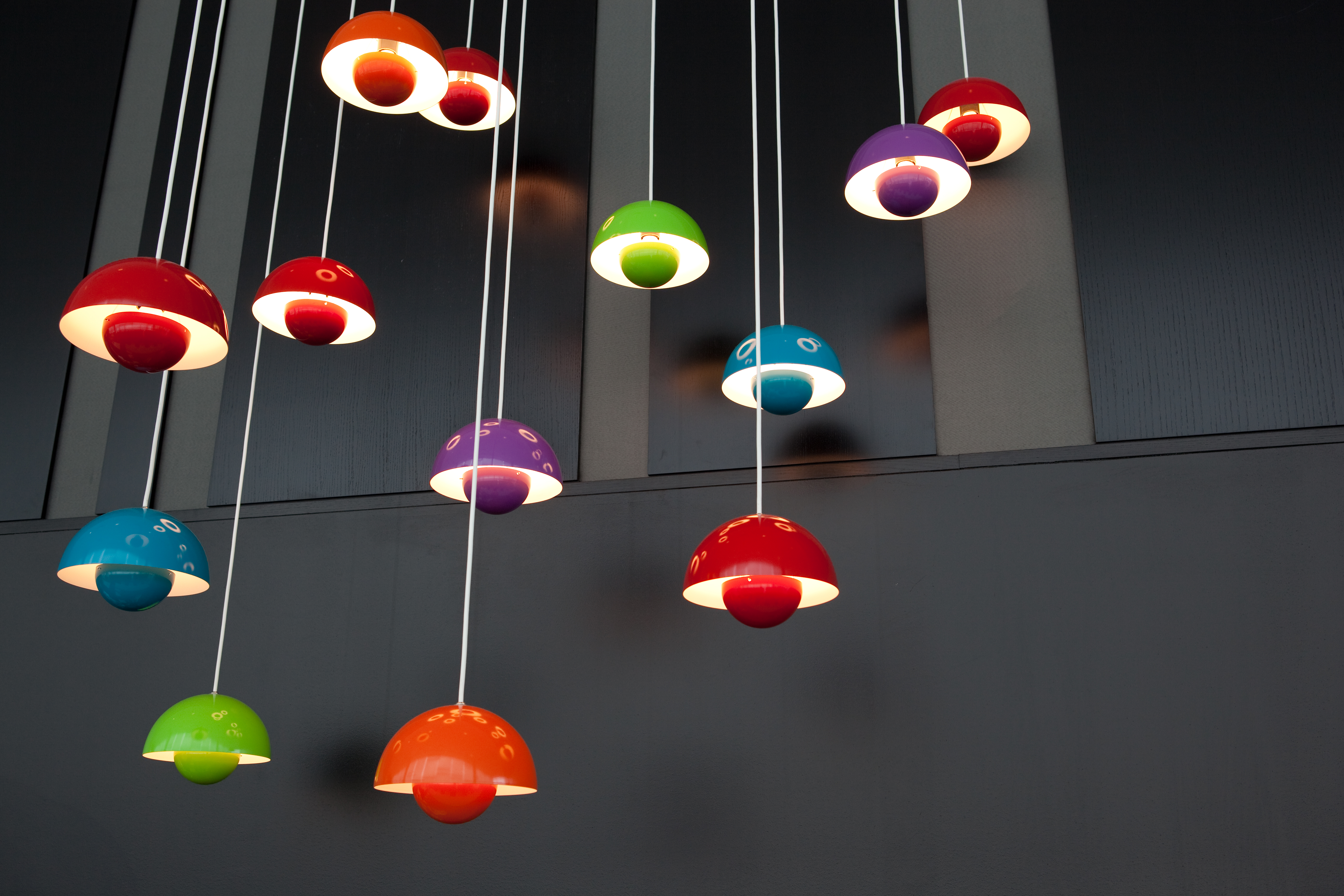
Flowerpot Lamps (designed 1968)

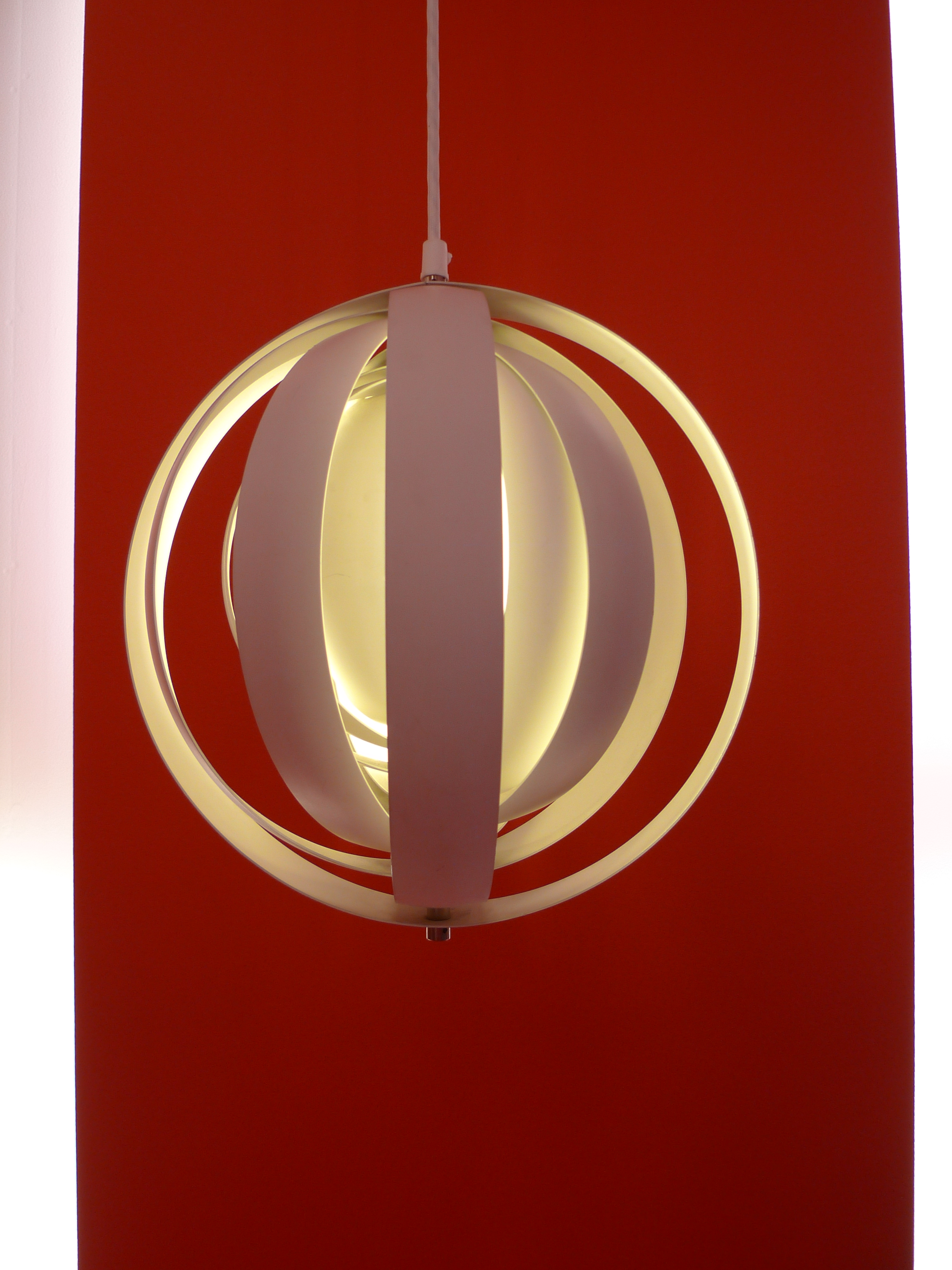
Moon Lamp (designed 1967)

Poul Kjærholm (1929–1980)

In addition to an academic career at the School of Arts and Crafts and at the Institute of Design at the Royal Academy, Kjærholm always took full account of the importance of place a piece of furniture had in surrounding architectural space. Functionality took second place to his artistic approach which was centred on elegantly clean lines and attention to detail. Unlike many of his contemporaries, he worked essentially with steel, combining it with wood, leather, cane or marble. Kjærhom developed a close understanding with the cabinetmaker E. Kold Christensen who produced most of his designs. Today a wide selection of his furniture is produced by Fritz Hansen. Kjærholm's work can be seen in New York's Museum of Modern Art and the Victoria and Albert Museum in London.

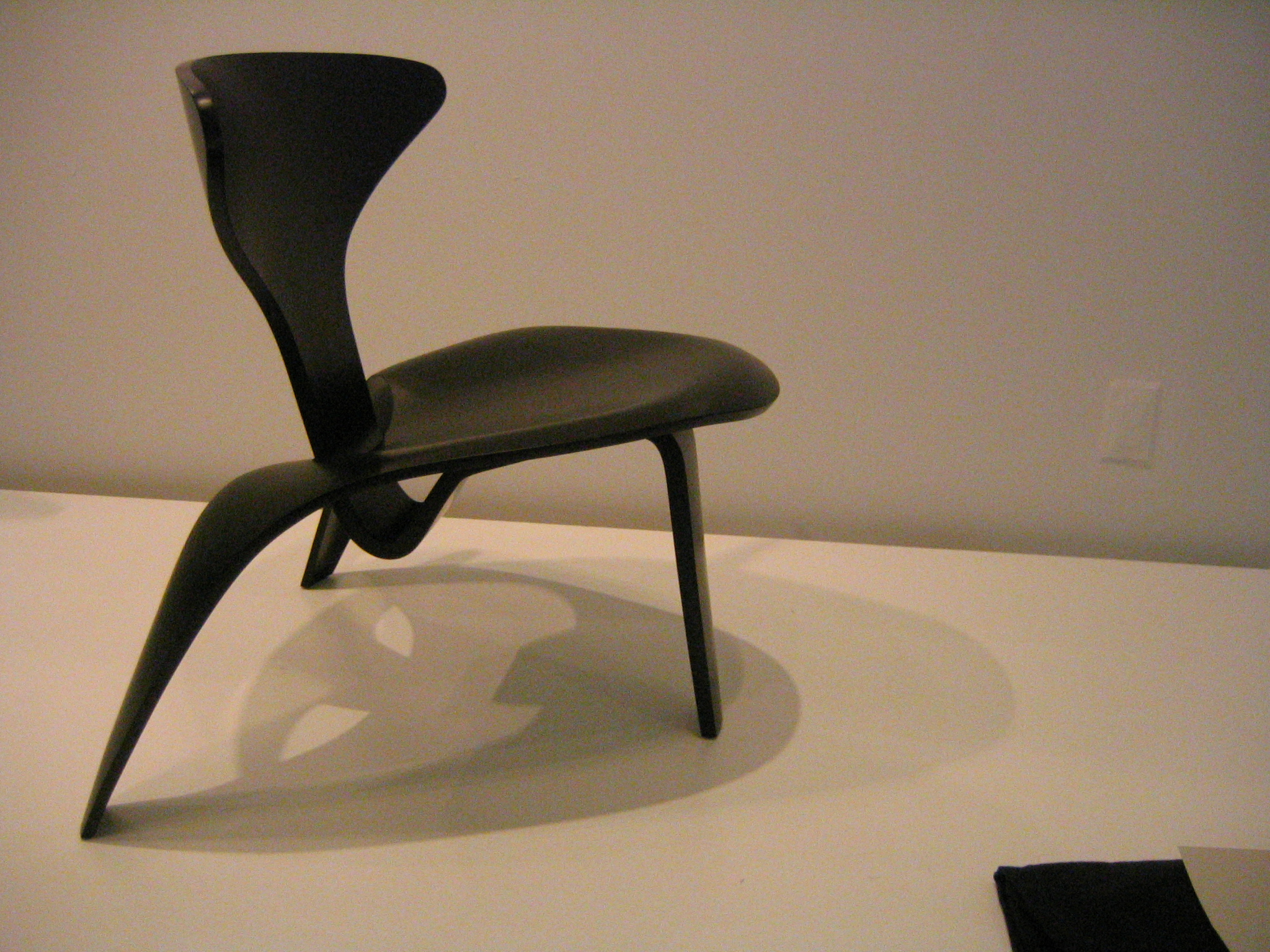
PK0 chair, designed 1952 but first produced 1997

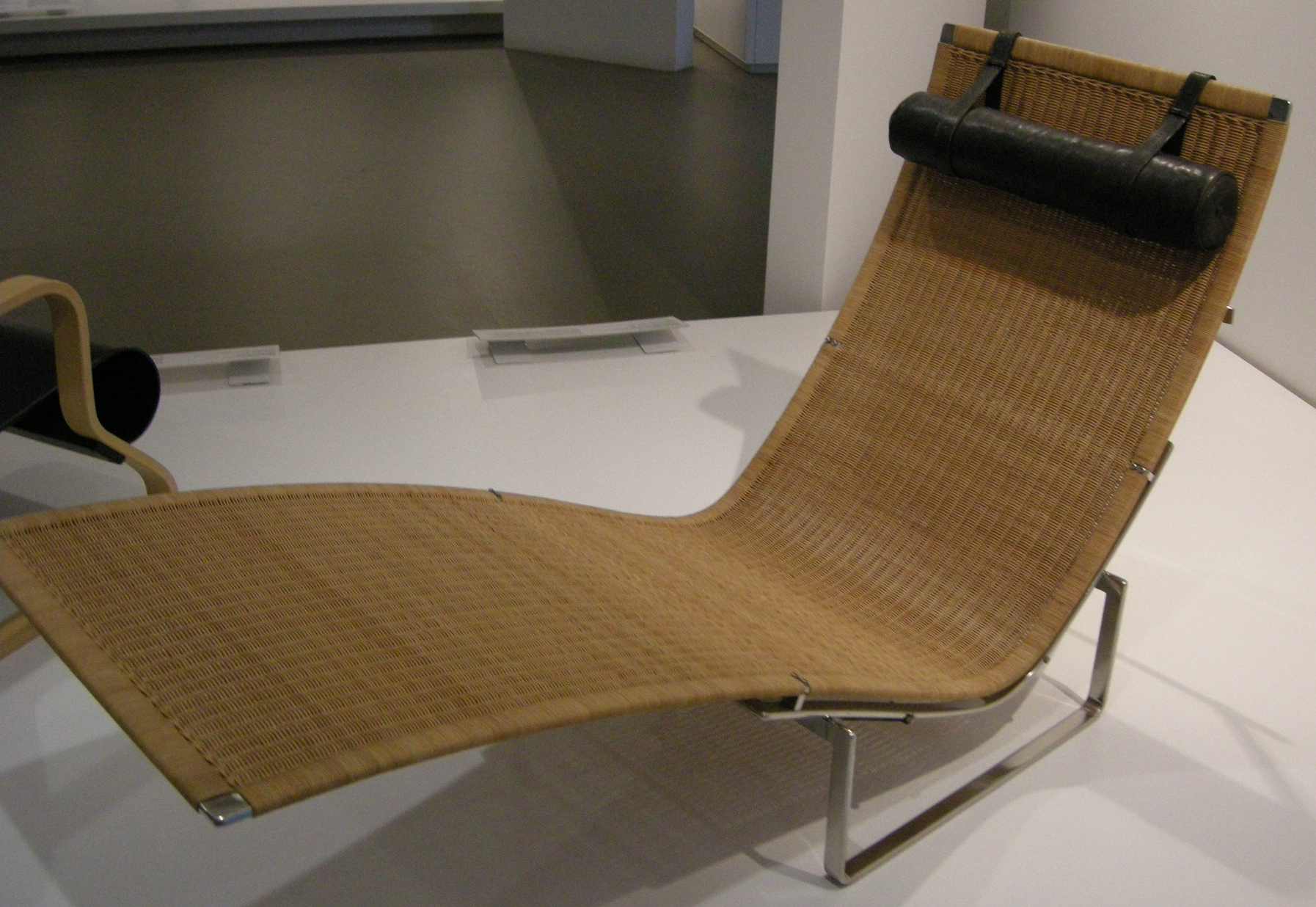
Hammock Chair 25 (1965)

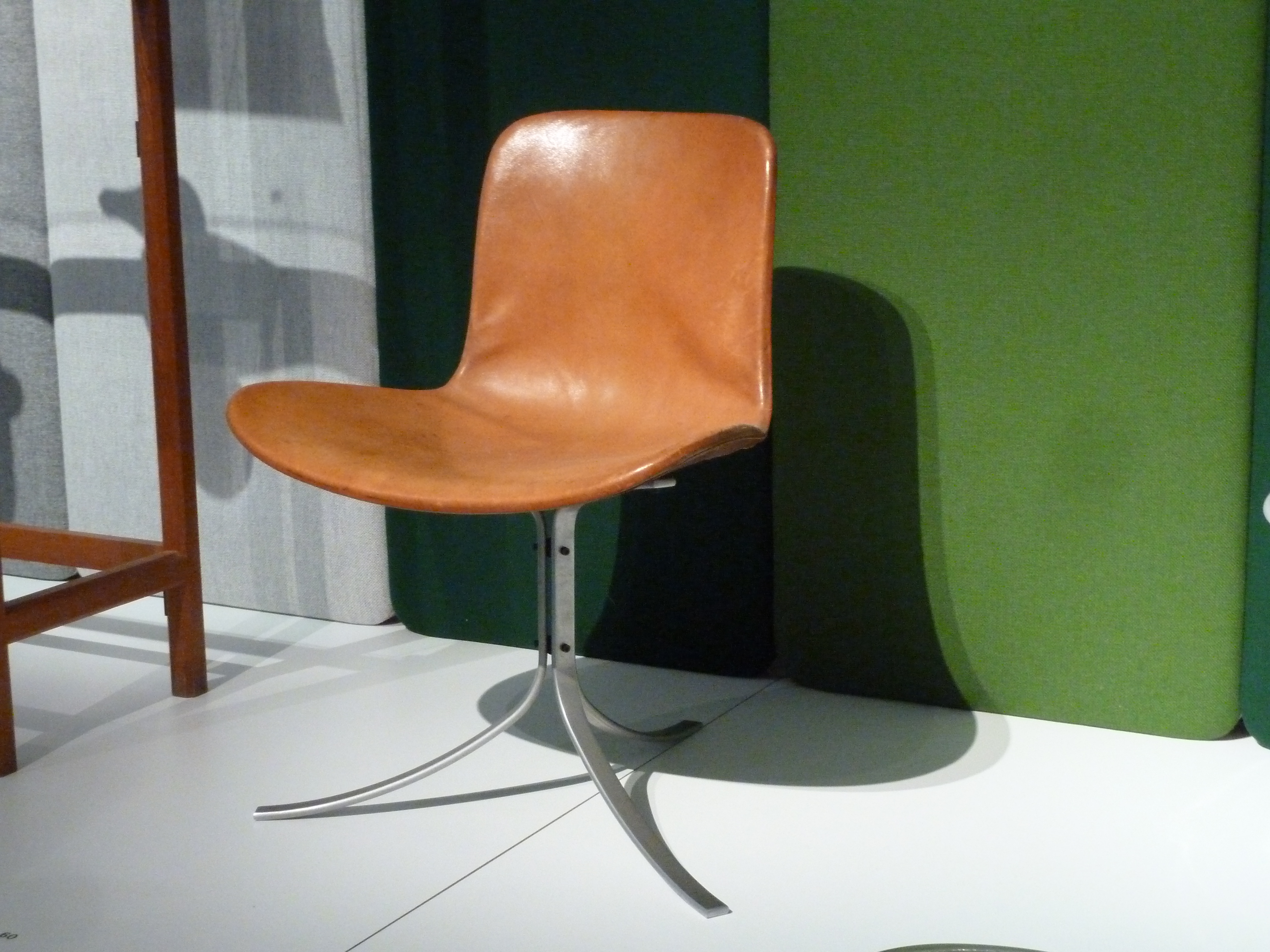
PK9 Chair (1960)

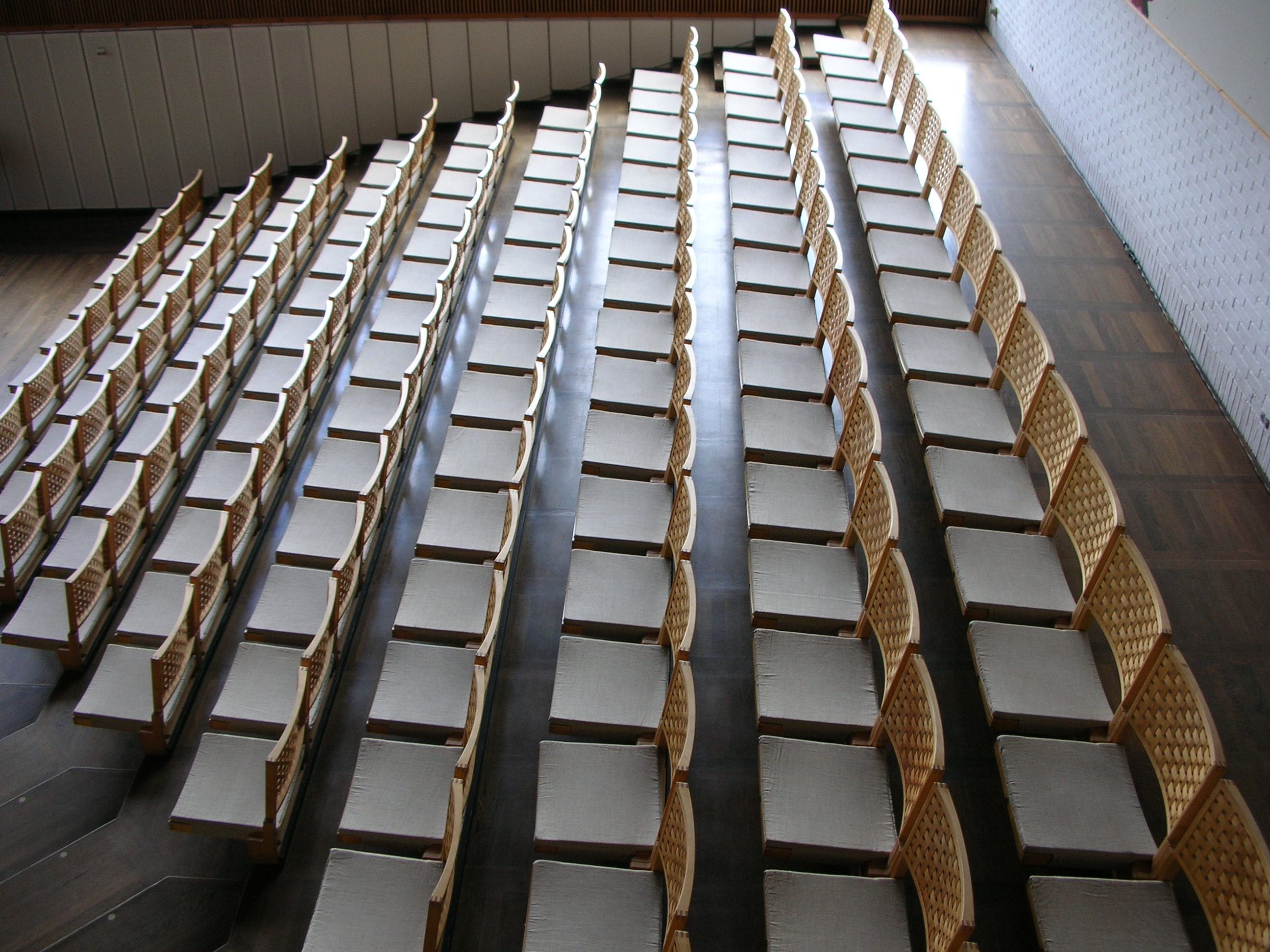
Kjærholm's chairs in the Louisiana Museum

Jens Risom (1916–2016)

Often credited with having introduced Danish Modern design to America, Risom was a graduate of Copenhagen School of Industrial Arts and Design. He emigrated to the United States in 1939 to study American design, working first as a textile designer and later as a freelance furniture designer. In 1941 he joined Hans Knoll at the Hans Knoll Furniture Company, and together they toured the country promoting Risom's designs. A true minimalist, Risom worked mainly in wood because it was cheap, and one of his most successful pieces, Knoll Chair #654 (which is still being manufactured) was made with a seat of nylon webbing that had been discarded by the army.

=== Other contributors ===
Many other designers and cabinetmakers contributed to the Danish modern scene. Several worked in partnerships, including:

- Tove and Edvard Kindt-Larsen (1901–1982), both students of Kaare Klint, working with contrasting materials
- Peter Hvidt (1916–1986) and Orla Mølgaard-Nielsen (1907–1993), remembered for the Ax Chair (1950) and the X Chair (1960)
- Ejner Larsen (1917–1987) and Aksel Bender Madsen (1916–2000) working mainly with teak and rosewood
- Preben Fabricius (1931–1984) and Jørgen Kastholm (1938–2007), demonstrating originality with their Horseshoe Chair (1962)

A number of cabinetmakers also developed skills in design. They include:

- Jacob Kjær (1896–1957), famous for his FN Chair, who also produced the furniture he designed
- Frits Henningsen (c. 1900 – c. 1970), who designed models produced at his own workshop in Copenhagen

Several other individuals made important contributions:

- Mogens Koch (1898–1992), remembered for his bookcases (1928) and folding chair (1932)
- Jørgen Gammelgaard (1938–1991), known for his Tip-Top lamp series.
- Rigmor Andersen (1903–1995), a versatile designer, maintaining the strict traditions of Klint's furniture school.
- Peder Moos (1906–1991), designed and built individual pieces on request, with his own special finish
- Kurt Østervig (1912–1986), trained in Odense, designed furniture for ships and cinemas as well as for the home.
- Helge Vestergaard Jensen (1917–1987), who produced the Daybed (1955)
- Hans Olsen (1919–1992), who experimented with materials and form, creating a number of items in his own distinctive style.
- Nanna Ditzel (1923–2005), pioneering new materials and production techniques, also working with textiles and jewelry
- Poul Volther (1923–2001), remembered above all for his iconic Corona Chair.
- Arne Vodder (1926–2009), a close friend and partner of Finn Juhl, his furniture sold particularly well in the United States.
- Bodil Kjær (born 1932), architect and interior designer who created a successful series of office furniture in the 1960s.
- Bernt Petersen (1937–2017), notable for his small, light stool (1959) with beautifully shaped legs and for his seating in theatres and concert halls.

A number of Danish textile designers worked closely with furniture designers to help shape the look of Danish modernism, for example by creating textiles for cushions, sofas, and beds. These include Lis Ahlmann and Vibeke Klint, among others.

== In popular culture ==
- The Cat Who Ate Danish Modern (1967): The second novel of American writer Lilian Jackson Braun's The Cat Who...
- In The Brady Bunch Season 2, Episode 18 — in "Our Son, the Man" the family house's den is referred to as being Danish modern.
- In House, M.D. Season 3, Episode 6 — in "Que Sera Sera" House's interior design preferences (as well as his patient, George's) are called Danish modern.

== See also ==
- A. Petersen
- Danish design
- List of chairs
- Lunning Prize
- Mid-century modern
- Modern furniture

== Literature ==
- Andresen. Carl Erik: Dansk møbelindustri 1870–1950, 1996, Århus: Systime, 157 p. ISBN 87-616-1265-0 (in Danish)
- Dybdahl, Lars (2018). Furniture boom : mid-century modern Danish furniture 1945–75. Copenhagen. ISBN 978-87-93604-12-4. OCLC 1057784424.
- Greenberg, Cara: Mid-century modern furniture of the 1950s, 1984 (reprinted 2000), London: Thames & Hudson, 176 p. ISBN 0-500-27859-8
- Hansen, Per H: Da danske møbler blev moderne: historien om dansk møbeldesigns storhedstid, 2006, Odense, Syddansk Universitetsforlag, 644 pp. ISBN 87-11-23196-3. (in Danish)
- Hansen, Per H.; Petersen, Klaus: Moderne dansk møbeldesign: tendenser, hammerslag og historie, 2007, Copenhagen, Gyldendal, 329 p. ISBN 87-02-06161-9 (in Danish)
- Hollingsworth, Andrew: Danish Modern, 2008, Salt Lake City: Gibbs Smith, 240 p. ISBN 978-1-58685-811-7
- Jalk, Grete: Dansk møbelkunst gennem 40 år – 40 years of Danish furniture design, 1987, Tåstrup: Teknologisk Instituts Forlag, 4 volumes: ISBN 87-7511-711-8, ISBN 87-7511-712-6, ISBN 87-7511-713-4 and ISBN 87-7511-714-2.
- Karlsen, Arne: Danish furniture design in the 20th century, 2007, Copenhagen: Christian Ejlers, two volumes: 328 p. & 223 p. ISBN 87-7241-677-7
- Wanscher, Ole (translated by David Hohnen): The art of furniture: 5000 years of furniture and interiors, 1968, London, Allen & Unwin, 419 p.
- Solaguren-Beascoa de Corral, Félix: "Jacobsen. Objects and Furniture Design", 2010, Barcelona, Ed. Poligrafa, 127 pages. ISBN 978-84-343-1183-1 / 978-84-343-11834-8
