= Kurt Østervig =

Danish furniture designer (1912–1986)

Kurt Østervig (1912–1986) was a Danish furniture designer.

Trained as a shipbuilder in Odense on the Danish island of Funen, Østervig's attachment to wood rather than steel led to his being employed as a furniture designer in E. Knudsen's Studio, among the largest of the times. In 1947, Østervig established his own studio, from where he worked with several of Scandinavia's largest furniture manufacturers. Particularly fond of working with oak, often combined with leather, he designed many special sets of furniture for ships, hotels, cinemas and nursing homes. His distinctive designs aroused widespread international interest, resulting in his work being exhibited in New York's Museum of Modern Art.

Among his more notable pieces from the 1950s are an elegant but simply styled daybed and a free-standing set of shelves with a bar.

== See also ==
- Danish modern
- Danish design
