= Ejner Larsen =

Danish furniture designer (1917–1987)

Ejner Larsen (1917–1987) was a Danish furniture designer who worked closely together with Aksel Bender Madsen.

== Biography ==
Son of cabinetmaker Otto Larsen, he was born in Copenhagen on 30 March 1917. After training as a cabinetmaker, he learnt furniture design at the Design School in Copenhagen, qualifying in 1940. Thereafter he worked with furniture designers Mogens Koch, Peter Koch and Palle Suenson. From 1942, he designed his own models which he exhibited at the annual Cabinetmakers Guild's exhibitions in Copenhagen.

While studying under Kaare Klint at the Royal Danish Academy of Fine Arts, he met Aksel Bender Madsen who became his partner. In 1947, they established a design studio together. The same year, they presented works made by cabinetmaker Willy Beck at the Cabinetmakers Guild's exhibition in Copenhagen where they continued to participate year after year. In addition to sculptural chair designs, they also designed living rooms, bedrooms, shelving, dining tables, and office furniture. Their most notable work is the Metropolitan Chair, in bent plywood, which was exhibited in 1949 and manufactured by Fritz Hansen from 1952. All their works have a clear, timeless, simple style which continues to please today.

== See also ==
- Danish modern
- Danish design
