= Frits Henningsen =

Danish furniture designer and cabinetmaker

Frits Henningsen (1889–1965) was a Danish furniture designer and cabinet maker who achieved high standards of quality with exclusively handmade pieces.

Henningsen was both the proprietor of a furniture-making workshop with a team of cabinetmakers in central Copenhagen as well as the designer of his own products. An active member of the Cabinetmakers Guild from 1927, he was admired by his peers for the high quality of his craftsmanship. Many of his pieces were crafted in exotic woods such as palisander and mahogany. All his furniture is handmade in line with traditional, labour-intensive methods from the 19th century. His pieces are noted for their elegance, above all for the soft curves in the arms of his chairs and sofas, demonstrating his traditional approach aiming to combine style and comfort.

In 1942, Henningsen distanced himself from the younger designers of the day who increasingly used straight lines in their work, believing furniture design needed to maintain curvature which contributed to a homely look.

== See also ==
- Danish modern
- Danish design
