= Jørgen Gammelgaard =

Danish furniture designer (1938–1991)

Jørgen Gammelgaard (1938–1991) was a Danish furniture designer who also designed lamps and silverware.

== Early life ==
Gammelgaard was trained as a cabinetmaker at the Copenhagen School of Arts and Crafts and served an apprenticeship (1957) at C. B. Hansen's workshop in Copenhagen. He then studied under Grete Jalk. He was a visiting student of furniture design at the Royal Academy (1962–1964) working under Poul Kjærholm and Ole Wanscher.

== Career ==
Gammelgaard worked as a cabinetmaker with A. J. Iversen (1957–1959) and, after studying at the academy, in Arne Jacobsen's studio (1968–1969). While working with Mogens Koch, Steen Eiler Rasmussen and Jørgen Bo, he undertook consultancy work for the UN in Samoa, where he designed his famous Tip-Top lampshade, followed later by work in Ceylon and the Sudan. In 1973, he established his own business. In 1987, when he was only 49, he was appointed professor at the Royal Academy's Department of Furniture and Spatial Art.

His notable designs range from silverware for Georg Jensen to fixtures for the Copenhangen University's Life Sciences department and for Rødovre Library as well as the Tip-Top and VIP lamp series. His simple but refined furniture, mostly in natural materials and stainless steel, includes a folding stool for Design Forum, a crest rail chair and steel tube chair for Collection Schiang and the EJ20 sofa for Erik Jørgensen. Both his Crestrail chairs, with their semicircular back, and the Skagen Chair, developed with Børge Schiang in the early 1980s are still in production.

== Awards ==
Jørgen Gammelgaard was the first designer to receive the annual awards from both the Danish Design Council (1986) and The Council for Arts and Crafts (1991).

== See also ==
- Danish modern
- Danish design
