= Hans Olsen (furniture designer) =

Danish furniture designer (1919–1992)

- Born: 1919
- Died: 1992 (aged 72–73)
- Education: Royal Danish Academy of Fine Arts

Hans Olsen (1919–1992) was a Danish furniture designer who created a number of items in his own distinctive style.

== Biography ==
Although Olsen was a student of Kaare Klint at the Royal Danish Academy's Furniture School from 1941 to 1943, he belongs to a group of Danish furniture designers who chose to experiment with both form and materials. In 1953, he set up his own studio where he designed and produced a series of exciting pieces in a distinctive style, exhibiting them at the annual fairs of the Cabinetmakers Guild in Copenhagen. One of his most notable designs is the Bikini Chair (1968) which like other chairs from his studio was in bent laminated wood. Though he was not one of the mainstream Danish modern school, he designed a range of items for furniture manufacturers including Bramin Møbler, Juul Kristensen, C.S. Møbler and Frem Røjle.

== See also ==
- Danish design
