= Peder Moos =

Peter Moos
- Born: 27 January 1906; Sønderborg, Denmark
- Died: 1 April 1991 (aged 85); Tønder, Denmark
- Education: Cabinetmaker
- Known for: Furniture design
- Movement: Art Nouveau

Peder Moos (27 January 1906 – 1 April 1991) was a Danish furniture designer and cabinetmaker who crafted nearly all his pieces himself.

The son of a farmer, he attended Askov Højskole, a folk High School, before training as a cabinetmaker in Jutland and later in Copenhagen. From 1926 to 1929, he worked in Paris, Geneva and Lausanne. In 1935, he moved into Bredgade in Copenhagen where he started his own workshop which he maintained for 20 years. He attended evening classes at the Royal Danish Academy of Fine Arts where he studied under Einar Utzon-Franck and Kaare Klint.

Moos designed a bed that could slide in and out of his window so that he could sleep in the fresh air. He worked in a special way, finding the wood he needed himself and making his furniture before drafting the plans. His pieces, which were made to order, were unique in their elegance. His style is reminiscent of Art Nouveau but more delicate and refined. Working mainly with wood, he would sand his pieces several times with very fine sandpaper, washing them off each time. This resulted in an especially fine finish. In place of nails and screws, he used dowels and wedges in another kind of wood, creating special effects almost like marquetry. He only created some 30 to 40 pieces, but each one is quite distinctive.

Apart from a trolley and a triangular coffee table manufactured by Fritz Hansen, Moos produced all his furniture himself. If customers asked what a piece would cost, he would reply: "If we have to think in terms of price, the result will not be as good as it could be. We'll see how it works out. If you think it is too expensive, I'll hold on to the furniture and sell it to someone else." More often than not, customers who left their furniture behind because they thought it was too expensive would change their minds and pick it up a few weeks later.

In 1956, Moos moved to Funen where he taught at the School of Crafts (Den danske Husflidshøjskole) in Kerteminde. He opened a workshop in Bredebro in the south of Jutland in 1962. His furniture has been exhibited in Stockholm, the Hague and New York's MoMA. It brings in high prices at auctions, a table with silver rivets selling for a record DKK 445,000 in 2005. In 2015, one of his dining tables were sold for 6 million DKK and in 2016 a stool were sold for DKK 860.000.

== See also ==
- Danish modern
- Danish design
