= Jacob Kjær =

Danish furniture designer (1896–1957)

Jacob Kjær (1896 – 1957) was a Danish furniture designer and cabinetmaker.

Kjær received training as a cabinetmaker in the workshop of his father who was also a furniture maker. After completing his training in Berlin and Paris, he exhibited works at the Barcelona World Exhibition in 1929. Characterized by simplicity, his designs drew on the finest materials which, unusually for his day, he crafted himself. Inspired by classical English Style, his clean, graceful designs are modern in interpretation. He did much to enhance the reputation of the Danish furniture industry as president of the Cabinetmakers Guild from 1952 to 1957 and of the Arts and Crafts Committee for Exports from 1944 to 1957.

One of his most notable works is the FN Chair designed for use at the United Nations Building in New York City. Kjær first made the chair in his own studio while production was initially handled by Christensen & Larsen. Today the chair is produced by Kitani in Japan who manufacture several of Kjær's designs.

== See also ==
- Danish modern
- Danish design
