= A. J. Iversen =

Danish cabinetmaker

Andreas Jeppe Iversen, usually known as A.J. Iversen (13 December 1888 - 17 December 1979), was a Danish cabinetmaker and furniture designer. From the 1920s, his collaboration with architects and designers paved the way for the style which later became known as Danish modern.

== Early life ==
Born in Sønder Bjert near Kolding in the south of Jutland, Iversen first worked as a fisherman like his father. In 1906, he became an apprentice in A. L. Johansen & Søn's furniture factory in Kolding. He then worked in various workshops both in Copenhagen and abroad, examining with interest the furniture he discovered in museums and castles. As a result of his evening classes with Frederik Poulsen and Rasmus Berg, he qualified as a cabinetmaker in 1916.

== Career ==
Although Iversen designed furniture himself, he soon began to collaborate with artists. At the Paris World Exhibition in 1925, he exhibited furniture designed by the architect Kaj Gottlob, earning himself an honorary award. From 1927, Iversen was a regular exhibitor at the Cabinetmakers Guild's annual furniture exhibitions in Copenhagen, for which he held the chairmanship from 1930 to 1934. Above all, he exhibited furniture designed by Ole Wanscher with whom he had a fruitful relationship for the rest of his life. He also made furniture for Viggo Boesen, Flemming and Mogens Lassen and for the Swedish designer, Torsten Johansson.

Iversen's simplified designs built on historical models while maintaining sensitivity and refinement. Always intent on pursuing the high quality norms of Danish cabinetmaking, he took advantage of the latest developments in production technology. One of the few Danish modern cabinetmakers who both designed and manufactured his own furniture, he is remembered above all for realizing many of Ole Wanscher's pieces including his Ming Round Occasional Table. Other items of note include his T-Chair and Egyptian Stool. Commenting on the difficulty of entering the exhibition environment in the early days, Iversen explains: "The older cabinetmakers maintained a strong hand on existing practice. They looked on Functionalism's simple lines like the plague. These old masters had position and experience, you owed them your respect, their opinions held weight and most of our colleagues tended to be their faithful followers. On the other hand, we had the support of young designers and most of the critics."

== Assessment ==
Iversen was an exceptionally fine cabinetmaker, devoted to his profession. He was alderman of the Copenhagen Cabinetmakers Guild from 1951 to 1961. In 1950, his son Gunnar Iversen became co-owner of his furniture factory. For his achievements, he was awarded both the Danish Order of the Dannebrog and the Swedish Order of Vasa.

== See also ==
- Danish modern
