= Jean Zimmerman =

American author, poet and historian (born 1957)

- Born: 1957 (age 68–69); New York

Jean Zimmerman (born 1957) is an American author, poet and historian.

== Biography ==
A graduate of Barnard College, Zimmerman earned a Master of Fine Arts degree in poetry from the Columbia University School of the Arts, and was awarded a New York State Fine Arts grant in 1983. She is married to Gil Reavill.

For her first book Zimmerman coauthored, with Felice N. Schwartz, a book about women in corporations, Breaking With Tradition: Women and Work, the New Facts of Life (1992) based on the Harvard Business Review article that ignited the “mommy track” debate. Her first solo work was Tailspin: Women at War in the Wake of Tailhook (1995) which focused on the Tailhook Association scandal and the crucial link between sexual harassment and the role of women as warriors.

With husband Gil Reavill as co-author, Zimmerman published Raising Our Athletic Daughters: How Sports Can Build Self-Esteem and Save Girls’ Lives (Doubleday, 1998), which was a Finalist for the 1999 Books for a Better Life Award sponsored by the National Multiple Sclerosis Society. Zimmerman's next book, Made from Scratch: Reclaiming the Pleasures of the American Hearth (2003), was an exploration of homemaking from a feminist perspective.

Her non-fiction book, The Women of the House: How a Colonial She-Merchant Built a Mansion, a Fortune, and a Dynasty (2006), gives a historical portrait of women in pre-Revolutionary New York City, with specific reference to Philipse Manor Hall and Philipsburg Manor House. Love, Fiercely: A Gilded Age Romance is a dual biography of Edith Minturn Stokes and Isaac Newton Phelps Stokes, a nineteenth-century couple known for philanthropy, architecture and documenting New York City history.

Zimmerman's historical novel The Orphanmaster, set in 17th century New Amsterdam, has been optioned for a film. Her follow-up historical novel, Savage Girl, centers on the Gilded Age in the Comstock Lode and Manhattan.

== Bibliography ==
- Breaking With Tradition: Women and Work, the New Facts of Life (1992, Warner Books) with Felice N. Schwartz
- Manhattan (1994, Fodor's Travel Publications) with Gil Reavill
- Tailspin: Women at War in the Wake of Tailhook (1995, Doubleday)
- Raising Our Athletic Daughters: How Sports Can Build Self-Esteem and Save Girls' Lives (1998, Doubleday) with Gil Revaill
- Made From Scratch: Reclaiming the Pleasures of the American Hearth (2003, Free Press)
- The Women of the House: How a Colonial She-Merchant Built a Mansion, a Fortune and a Dynasty (2006, Harcourt)
- Love, Fiercely: A Gilded Age Romance (2012, Houghton, Mifflin Harcourt)
- The Orphan Master: A Novel of Early Manhattan (2012, Viking Penguin)
- Savage Girl: A Novel (2014, Viking Penguin)
