= Tony Schwartz (writer) =

American journalist and ghostwriter (born 1952)

- Born: May 2, 1952 (age 74); New York City, U.S.
- Education: University of Michigan (BA)
- Occupations: Journalist, advocate, professional speaker
- Known for: Ghostwriting The Art of the Deal
- Spouse: Deborah Pines (m. 1979)

Tony Schwartz (born May 2, 1952) is an American journalist and business book author who ghostwrote the 1987 book The Art of the Deal, which was credited to Donald Trump.

== Early life and education ==
Schwartz was born to Irving Schwartz and Felice Schwartz. His mother was the founder of the nonprofit organization Catalyst, Inc., which works to build inclusive workplaces and expand opportunities for women and businesses. In 1974, Schwartz graduated Phi Beta Kappa from the University of Michigan, where he majored in American studies.

== Career ==
Schwartz began his career as a writer in 1975 and spent 25 years as a journalist. He was a columnist for The New York Post, associate editor at Newsweek, a reporter for The New York Times, and a staff writer at New York Magazine and Esquire. In 1985, Schwartz began interviewing Donald Trump to ghostwrite Trump: The Art of the Deal (1987), for which he was credited as co-author. According to Schwartz, Trump wrote none of the book, choosing only to remove a few critical mentions of business colleagues at the end of the process.

In 1995, Schwartz wrote What Really Matters: Searching for Wisdom in America. In 1998, he co-authored Risking Failure, Surviving Success with Michael Eisner, then the CEO of The Walt Disney Company. In 1999, Schwartz joined LGE Performance Systems, a training company, where he served as president until 2003. In the same year, Schwartz co-authored The Power of Full Engagement: Managing Energy Not Time with LGE chairman Jim Loehr. In 2003, Schwartz founded The Energy Project, a consulting firm that focuses on the improvement of employee productivity and counts Facebook as one of its clients. He launched The Energy Project Europe in 2005, with headquarters outside London. In October 2007, Schwartz's article "Manage Energy Not Time: The Science of Stamina", co-authored with The Energy Project's former COO Catherine McCarthy, was published in the Harvard Business Review (HBR). The article described the impact of The Energy Project curriculum at three Fortune 500 companies. In June 2010, Schwartz published another article in the HBR called "The Productivity Paradox: How Sony Pictures Gets More Out of People by Demanding Less", covering Sony Pictures's implementation of Energy Project guidelines. He has blogged in the HBR.

Schwartz's book The Way We're Working Isn't Working: Fueling the Four Needs that Energize Great Performance, co-authored with The Energy Project Europe's chairman Jean Gomes and Catherine McCarthy, was published in May 2010. It later was republished under the title Be Excellent at Anything: The Four Keys To Transforming the Way We Work and Live for a short time. Now, the book can be found under its original title. Schwartz began writing a bi-weekly column for The New York Times financial news report, DealBook, titled Life@Work in May 2013.

In 2014, Schwartz co-wrote an article, "Why You Hate Work", with Georgetown University McDonough School of Business Associate Professor, Christine Porath, about a collaboration between Harvard Business Review (HBR) and The Energy Project to find out what makes people productive and engaged at work.

== Relationship with Donald Trump ==
In 2016, Schwartz related that while writing The Art of the Deal in 1986–87, he was able to "shadow" Trump for nearly 18 months, during which time he spent long periods with him in Trump's office and residence. When Trump began his 2016 presidential run, Schwartz said that he found the idea of Trump becoming president "alarming", and gave a series of interviews to recount his experiences with Trump. These appeared in The New Yorker, Good Morning America, and Real Time with Bill Maher, among others.

Schwartz was critical of Trump, saying that he was poorly qualified to be president. He considered Trump to be "pathologically impulsive and self-centered", with a short attention span that "has left him with a stunning level of superficial knowledge and plain ignorance".

Schwartz was also critical of Trump's truthfulness. "Lying is second nature to him", Schwartz said. "More than anyone else I have ever met, Trump has the ability to convince himself that whatever he is saying at any given moment is true, or sort of true, or at least ought to be true." "He had a complete lack of conscience about it [lying]", he said. Since most people are "constrained by the truth", Trump's indifference to it "gave him a strange advantage".

While The Art of the Deal was a commercial success and portrayed Trump as a savvy businessman, Schwartz said he came to regret writing the book, and if he were to write another book he would entitle it The Sociopath. He added: "I feel a deep sense of remorse that I contributed to presenting Trump in a way that brought him wider attention and made him more appealing than he is."

Trump subsequently attacked Schwartz on Twitter, calling him a "Dummy writer", "wanted to do a second book with me for years (I said no)", "a hostile basket case who feels jilted!" and an "Irrelevant dope!", and later threatened him with lawsuits.

Preceding the 2024 presidential election, Schwartz continued his criticism of Trump.

== Books ==
- Trump: The Art of the Deal with Donald Trump (Random House, 1987) ISBN 9780394555287
- What Really Matters: Searching for Wisdom in America (Bantam, 1995) ISBN 9780553093988
- Work in Progress: Risking Failure, Surviving Success with Michael Eisner (Random House, 1998) ISBN 9780375500718
- The Power of Full Engagement: Managing Energy, Not Time, Is the Key to High Performance and Personal Renewal with Jim Loehr (Free Press, 2003) ISBN 9780743226745
- Be Excellent at Anything: The Four Keys to Transforming the Way We Work and Live with Jean Gomes and Catherine McCarthy, Ph.D. (Free Press, 2010) ISBN 9781849834322 – also published under the title The Way We're Working Isn't Working: The Four Forgotten Needs That Energize Great Performance (Free Press, 2010) ISBN 9781439127667
- Dealing with the Devil: My Mother, Trump and Me (Audible Original, 2020)
