= Catalyst (nonprofit organization) =

Nonprofit organization

Catalyst Inc.
- Formation: 1962; 64 years ago
- Founder: Felice Schwartz
- Location(s): HQ 120 Wall Street 15th Floor; New York City; U.S.
- Key people: Jennifer McCollum (CEO and president)
- Employees: 100
- Website: www.catalyst.org

Catalyst Inc. is a global nonprofit founded by feminist writer and advocate Felice Schwartz in 1962. Schwartz also served as Catalyst's president for 31 years.

Catalyst's stated mission is to "accelerate progress for women through workplace inclusion." Recent topics of focus include: board diversity; gender, race and ethnicity; inclusive cultures; LGBTQ; men and equality; the gender pay gap; sexual harassment; and unconscious bias. Catalyst also offers consulting services to supporter organizations seeking to improve workplace culture, diversity and inclusion, initiative outcomes and representation of women in their organizations.

In addition to research activities, Catalyst has launched targeted initiatives to increase the number of women in leadership positions. These initiatives include Catalyst CEO Champions For Change, Catalyst Women on Board, Enlist Men's Support for Gender Equality, Men Advocating Real Change/MARC. Catalyst also presents Catalyst Awards and Catalyst Canada Honours to celebrate individuals and organizations that are positive role models for change.

== History ==
=== Founding ===
In 1945, Felice Schwartz, who was then still a Smith undergraduate, established the National Scholarship Service and Fund for Negro Students. Her organization helped link students of color with scholarships and financial aid, and lobbied colleges and universities to accept students of color.

In 1951, after her father died, Felice Schwartz joined her brother Theodore Nierenberg to help manage their father's manufacturing business. Married and a mother, Schwartz worked as the vice president of production until they sold the business for a small profit three-and-a-half years later. The experiences Schwartz gained while working and raising a family spurred her to found Catalyst in 1962 with the stated mission, "to bring to our country's needs the unused abilities of intelligent women who want to combine work and family."

=== The Early Years: 1960s ===
The 1960s saw Catalyst focused on promoting job-sharing programs and collecting and disseminating information to women who were interested in pursuing a career.

In 1966, Catalyst partnered with the Massachusetts Department of Public Welfare to launch a pilot job-sharing program for women. Twenty-five jobs as a welfare case worker were opened for 50 women. In 1971, Part-Time Social Workers in Public Welfare was published showing that these 50 women were 89% as productive as full-time case workers and had one-third less turnover as full-time case workers.

=== The 1970s & 1980s ===
As more women entered the workforce, Catalyst shifted its focus to topics such as dual career families, childcare and women on corporate boards. Catalyst established the Corporate Child Care Resource to monitor childcare activities around the country and report on best practices. Catalyst branched out from the public sector into the private sector, gaining corporate supporters.

Schwartz became a more prominent voice in the women's movement. She authored numerous articles, was interviewed by the media and co-authored her first book, How to Go to Work When Your Husband Is Against It, Your Children Aren't Old Enough, and There's Nothing You Can Do Anyhow, along with her Catalyst colleagues Margaret H. Schifter and Susan S. Gillotti. She launched the Catalyst Awards to recognize women board directors.

=== The Mommy Track Controversy ===
Schwartz was a prolific writer but is most known for her 1989 article, Management Women and the New Facts of Life published in Harvard Business Review. The piece sparked a national debate by stating that "the cost of employing women in management is greater than the cost of employing men," and suggesting that employers create two tracks for women, one for the career focused and one for the family focused.

In response to the article, the New York Times published 'Mommy Career Track' Sets Off a Furor, and branded Schwartz as the "mommy track" creator. The Times article quoted prominent feminists who called the idea of two career paths "horrifying" and "damaging to women's advancement." Critics claimed the article validated the idea that women could have a family or a career but not both. Adding to the controversy was the lack of corroborating evidence for Schwartz's assertions. Her critics stated, ''If this is such hot stuff, where's the documentation?''

Schwartz claimed that her article was misinterpreted, saying, "I violated the politically correct thing by saying that women are not just like men. What I said then and still say is that women face many, many obstacles in the workplace that men do not face. I was saying to that group of men at the top, 'Rather than let women's talents go to waste, do something about it.'"

In 1992, Schwartz published the book, Breaking with Tradition: Women and Work, The New Facts of Life, a response and expansion of the "mommy track" idea.

Ten years after the original article was published, Schwartz's son Tony revisited the debate and offered up some insights from the controversy. In his article, Tony Schwartz argues that his mother's idea of dividing women into two categories was misguided, but her argument that to retain women companies need to give them more flexibility to manage a career and family, was on point.

=== The End of the Schwartz Era ===
After 31 years at the helm of Catalyst, Schwartz retired in 1993. She was in failing health and died in 1996 at the age of 71. Shortly thereafter, her final book was published, The Armchair Activist: Simple Yet Powerful Ways to Fight the Radical Right, co-authored with Suzanne K. Levine.

=== 1993 and Beyond ===
Since the Schwartz era and through its next three presidents, Catalyst expanded its offerings and geographic footprint. In 1993, the Board appointed Sheila Wellington, a former vice-president of Yale University, to become the new president and CEO. As the leader of Catalyst, Wellington instituted more rigorous research standards, expanded Catalyst studies to include non-US geographies and women of color, and launched the annual Census of Women Board Directors, which became one of Catalyst's signature studies.

Wellington resigned in 2003 to accept a Professorship at New York University's Leonard N. Stern School of Business. She is now a board member of the Institute for Women's Policy Research and the Transitions Network, as well as serving on the NYC Commission on Women's Issues.

In 2003, Ilene H. Lang assumed the role of president. Lang was a technology industry executive and founding CEO of AltaVista Internet Software Inc., a First Light Capital venture partner, and a previous senior executive at Lotus Development Corporation. During her tenure, Lang further expanded Catalyst globally, opening offices in Europe, India, Australia and Japan.

In 2014, Lang stepped down, and Deborah Gillis was named President & CEO. A Canadian, Gillis was the first non-American President & CEO. Prior to joining Catalyst, she worked in the public sector for the governments of Nova Scotia and Ontario and as a consultant for PricewaterhouseCoopers and Grant Thornton.

In 2018, Gillis stepped down to accept the position of President & CEO of the Centre for Addiction and Mental Health (CAMH) Foundation, and Ilene H. Lang resumed her former leadership role as Catalyst's Interim President & CEO. In August 2018, Lorraine Hariton became President & CEO. Hariton retired from Catalyst in 2024, and Jennifer McCollum was appointed the new CEO and President of the organization on April 1, 2024.

== Organization ==
=== Leadership ===
Catalyst's President & CEO is Jennifer McCollum, who previously served as CEO of Linkage, Inc. The Board of Directors Chair is Kathy Warden of Northrop Grumman.

Catalyst is governed by a board of directors that includes 36 companies from a variety of industries including: oil and gas, consumer products, retail, restaurants, accounting, consulting, business services, financial services, technology, travel, aerospace and defense, engineering, law, pharmaceuticals, health, and telecommunications.

=== Supporters ===
Catalyst receives funding for research and ongoing operations from more than 800 supporter organizations across the globe.

=== Regions ===
As a global nonprofit, Catalyst has operations in the United States, Canada, Europe, and many other countries. Their United States office is located in New York, NY while their Canadian and European headquarters are Toronto, ON and Zurich, Switzerland respectively.

More recent expansions brought Catalyst to South and Central America where they partner with MAREA Consulting to work with women and others in the region. Their Asia Pacific presence is headquartered in Australia where they partner with regional organizations to fulfill their mission.

=== Catalyst, Inc. Archive ===
In 2022, the Catalyst archive opened to the public at Hagley Museum and Library in Wilmington, DE. The archive is made up of two collections: the organizational records and the audiovisual materials produced by Catalyst. Over 60 years of history are documented in the archive, covering topics such as their seminars and conferences, early initiatives, the Catalyst Awards, and decades of gender-based research.

The collection also includes a small amount of objects, largely awards and promotional material.

== Major Initiatives ==
=== Catalyst CEO Champions For Change ===
Launched on International Women's Day in 2017, the Catalyst CEO Champions For Change initiative showcases commitments by CEOs to advance all women, including women of color, into leadership positions in their companies and on their boards. Catalyst asks participants to publicly declare their support, take a pledge of organizational and personal commitments, and report their company's progress each year against established diversity metrics. The first report on the participating companies' progress was released in November 2017.

=== Catalyst Awards ===
Originally begun in 1976 to celebrate individual women board members, the Catalyst Award shifted to recognizing individual organizations in 1987. Since then, the award has recognized corporations and the specific programs they have created to recruit, develop, and advance women. Company initiatives are evaluated on seven criteria: strategy and rationale, senior leadership activities, accountability and transparency, communication, employee engagement, innovation, and measurable results. Catalyst has recognized 94 initiatives at 85 organizations from around the world since 1987.

Initiatives are publicly celebrated at the annual Catalyst Awards Conference and Dinner held in New York City. The 2018 awards dinner had more than 2,000 attendees, including executives from global corporations, professional firms, governments, NGOs, and educational institutions.

==== Award Winners, 2011-2020 ====
2011 — Kaiser Permanente, McDonald's, Time Warner
2012 — Commonwealth Bank, Sodexo
2013 — Alcoa, Coca-Cola Company, Unilever
2014 — Kimberly-Clark, Lockheed Martin
2015 — Chevron Corporation, Procter & Gamble
2016 — Gap
2017 — 3M, Bank of Montreal, Rockwell Automation
2018 — Boston Consulting Group, IBM, Nationwide, Northrop Grumman
2019 — Bank of America, Deutsche Post DHL Group, Eli Lilly and Company, Schneider Electric
2020 — Deloitte, Medtronic, Unilever

== Publications ==
Catalyst publishes across a wide range of topics, including: board diversity; gender, race, and ethnicity; inclusive cultures; LGBTQ men and equality; the gender pay gap; sexual harassment; and unconscious bias. Below is a list of some of their publications:

- 1992: Women in Engineering: An Untapped Resource
- 1993: Creating Successful Mentoring Programs: A Catalyst Guide
- 1994: Cracking the Glass Ceiling: Strategies for Success
- 1995: The CEO View: Women On Corporate Boards
- 1996: Women In Corporate Leadership: Progress & Prospects
- 1997: A New Approach to Flexibility: Managing the Work/Time Equation
- 1998: Women of Color in Corporate Management: Dynamics of Career Advancement
- 1999: Women Scientists in Industry: A Winning Formula for Companies
- 2000: Breaking the Barriers: Women in Senior Management in the UK
- 2001: Women of Color Executives: Their Voices, Their Journeys
- 2002: Europe, Women in Leadership: A European Business Imperative
- 2003: Bit By Bit: A Catalyst Guide To Advancing Women In High Tech Companies
- 2004: The Bottom Line: Connecting Corporate Performance and Gender Diversity
- 2005: Women "Take Care," Men "Take Charge:" Stereotyping Of U.S. Business Leaders Exposed
- 2006: Different Cultures, Similar Perceptions: Stereotyping of Western European Business Leaders
- 2007: Making Change: LGBT Inclusion – Understanding the Challenges
- 2008: Unwritten Rules: What You Don't Know Can Hurt Your Career
- 2009: Opportunity or Setback? High Potential Women and Men During Economic Crisis
- 2010: Pipeline's Broken Promise
- 2011: Sponsoring Women to Success
- 2012: Good Intentions, Imperfect Execution? Women Get Fewer Of the "Hot Jobs" Needed To Advance
- 2013: High Potentials in the Pipeline: On Their Way to the Boardroom
- 2014: Inclusive Leadership: The View from Six Countries
- 2015: Think People, Not Just Programs, to Build Inclusive Workplaces
- 2016: Emotional Tax: How Black Women and Men Pay More at Work and How Leaders Can Take Action
- 2017: The Journey to Inclusion: Building Workplaces That Work for Women In Japan
- 2018: Day-To-Day Experiences of Emotional Tax Among Women and Men of Color in the Workplace
- 2020: Why Empathy is a Superpower in the Future of Work
- 2022: Emotional Tax and Work Teams: A View from Five Countries
- 2025: Risks of Retreat: The Enduring Inclusion Imperative
- 2026: The Convergent Leader: A New Leadership Model for Sustaining Growth Through Disruption

== See also ==
- List of women CEOs of Fortune 500 companies
