= La Négresse (disambiguation) =

La Négresse is a 1952–53 artwork by Henri Matisse made of cut pieces of colored paper.

La Négresse may also refer to:

- La Négresse (Manet), an 1862 painting by Édouard Manet
- La Négresse (Nieriker painting), an 1879 painting by Abigail May Alcott Nieriker
- La Négresse (previously, Harausta), a neighborhood in Biarritz, France
