= Martha Nierenberg =

Hungarian-American businesswoman, merchant, and scientist (1924–2020)

- Born: Martha Weiss de Csepel Nierenberg; March 12, 1924
- Died: June 27, 2020 (aged 96)
- Known for: co-founder of Dansk International Designs

Martha Nierenberg (March 12, 1924 – June 27, 2020) (known in full as Martha née Weiss de Csepel Nierenberg), was a Hungarian-born American businesswoman who co-founded Dansk International Designs.

== Early life and education ==
Nierenberg was born in Budapest on March 12, 1924, into one of Hungary's wealthiest families. She was the daughter of Alfonz Weiss de Csepel, who headed the Manfréd Weiss Steel and Metal Works and its foundation and Erzsbet Herzog Weiss de Csepel, a medical doctor who had studied psychiatry in Vienna with Anna Freud.

She had two brothers (John, 1936–2017) and a sister (Mary Radcliffe). Jewish by birth, Martha attended a Calvinist school, to focus on science and math, then enrolled in a science college in Budapest.

Her maternal grandfather, the banker Baron Mór Lipót Herzog (1869–1934), numbered among Europe's leading art and antiquities collectors. Her paternal grandfather, Manfred Weiss de Csepel, founded the Manfred Weiss Steel and Metal Works, Hungary's largest machine factory, employing 40,000 people once.

She evaded capture during the World War II by fleeing via Austria to Portugal in 1944. After more than a year there, she emigrated with her mother to the United States on 27 December 1946.

== Career ==
A scientist who spoke six languages, Martha received a Master of Science degree in biochemistry from Radcliffe College and conducted research at MIT and the Rockefeller Institute for Medical Research in Manhattan.

=== Founding of Dansk International Designs ===
On a trip to Europe in 1954, the Nierenbergs sought out products to manufacture in the U.S. for American consumers. At the Danish museum of arts and crafts—Kunsthandwaerkmuseet (today called the Danish Museum of Art & Design—Kunstindustrimuseet) they noted teak and stainless steel cutlery by Jens Quistgaard. The Nierenbergs recruited Quistgaard to manufacture the cutlery, which became Dansk Designs' first product, Fjord flatware. That same year, the Nierenbergs established Dansk in the garage of their Great Neck, New York, home, with Quistgaard as its founding designer.

== Personal ==
She met Theodore David Nierenberg (1923–2009), the owner of a metal finishing company, at the Broadway premiere of Guys and Dolls in 1950. They married in 1951, moved to Great Neck, on Long Island, and had four children – Lisa, Karin Weisburgh, Peter and Al. The family lived in Armonk from 1963 to 2013. In 1954, she and Nierenberg founded the Dansk Designs housewares company.

She died on June 27, 2020, in Rye, New York.

== Claims for restitution of art ==
In 1995 Nierenberg commenced a decades-long Holocaust art restitution battle with the Republic of Hungary that would count as one of the highest-value cases ever pursued by a single family. Among the 44 paintings Hungary has refused to return are four works by El Greco, and others by Zurbarán, Velázquez, Corot, Courbet, and Lucas Cranach the Elder. Nierenberg's trustee, her granddaughter Robin Bunevich, estimated the collection to be worth $100 million. in 2010, Nierenberg's nephew, David, with funding from the billionaire philanthropist Ronald S. Lauder, filed suit in United States District Court for the District of Columbia. In June 2017, Judge Tatel found the Foreign Sovereign Immunities Act did not prevent the survivors of a Holocaust victim from suing to recover art stolen by Nazi plunderers, over the partial dissent of Senior Judge A. Raymond Randolph. In 2017, the U.S. Supreme Court declined to hear the case.
