= Pinacoteca Giovanni e Marella Agnelli =

Art gallery in Turin, Italy

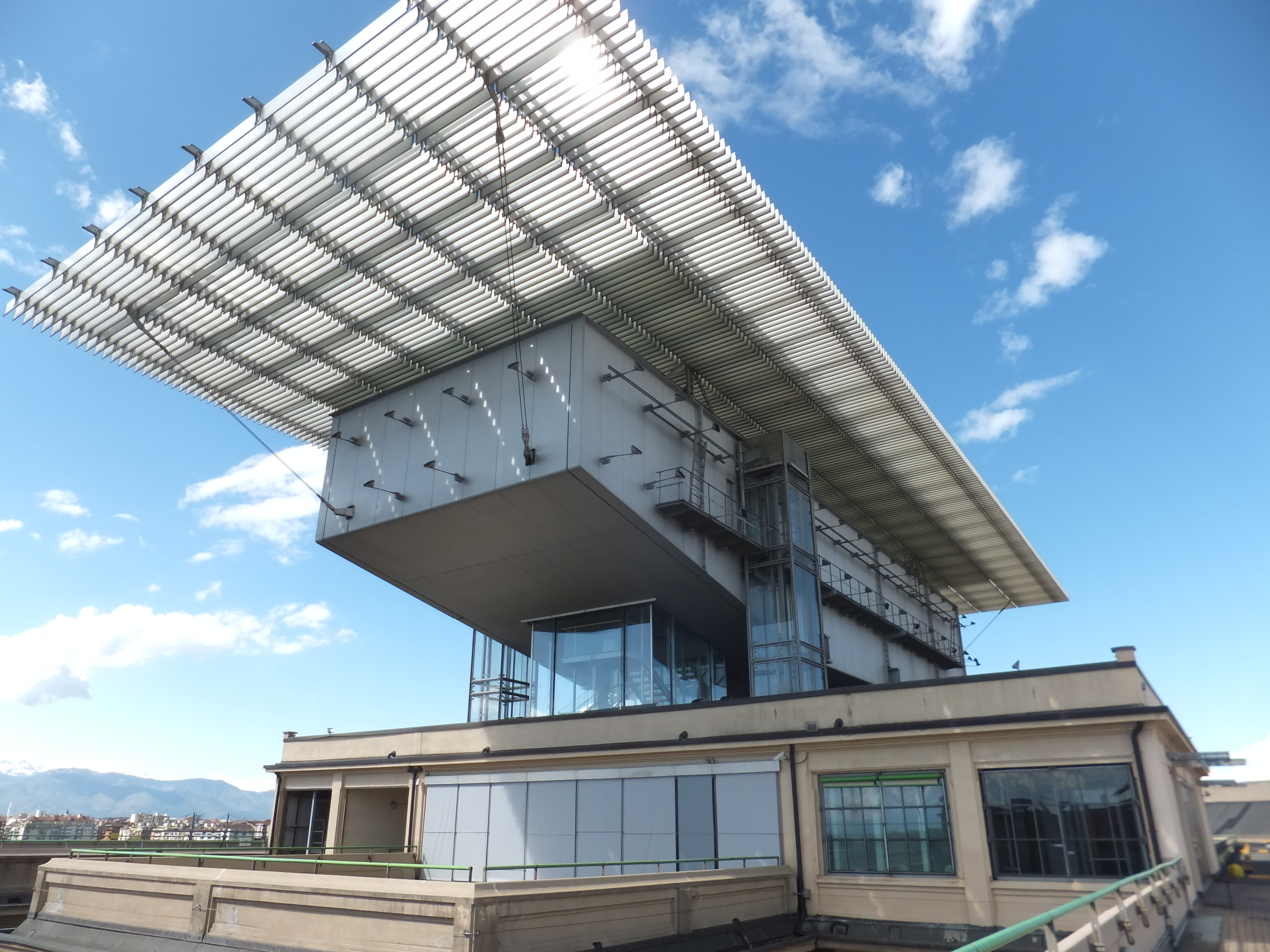
View of the Pinacoteca Giovanni e Marella Agnelli

The Pinacoteca Giovanni e Marella Agnelli or Pinacoteca Agnelli is an art gallery in Turin, Italy. It opened in 2002 on the top floor of the Lingotto complex, the headquarters of the Italian auto giant Fiat S.p.A. founded in 1899 by Giovanni Agnelli. As part of the complex, Lo scrigno, a 450 square-metre steel structure designed by Renzo Piano, is raised 34 metres off the test track on the roof of the plant. Its style represents a crystal spaceship, referring back to the original building's futuristic style. Its permanent collection is a selection of paintings and sculptures from Gianni and Marella Agnelli's private collection, such as Pierre-Auguste Renoir's Blonde Bather and Édouard Manet's La Négresse, as well as paintings by Henri Matisse, Canaletto, Giovanni Battista Tiepolo, Antonio Canova, Pablo Picasso, and Amedeo Modigliani. The gallery also puts on temporary modern art exhibitions.

After his death on 24 January 2003, Gianni Agnelli lay in state in the Pinacoteca, where more than 100,000 people paid their respects.
