= Gil Reavill =

American author, journalist and screenwriter

- Born: 1953 (age 72–73); Wisconsin, United States
- Occupations: Author, journalist, screenwriter
- Spouse: Jean Zimmerman

Gil Reavill (born 1953) is an American author, journalist and screenwriter whose work has appeared in a variety of media.

== Early and personal life ==
Reavill was born in Wausau, Wisconsin, and educated at the University of Wisconsin–Madison and the University of Colorado. He lives in New York with his wife and daughter.

== Career ==
After working at daily newspapers in Colorado, Reavill moved to New York in 1981. Among his jobs in the early 1980s was ghostwriting for Al Goldstein, publisher of Screw magazine. Out of that experience grew his non-fiction book Smut: A Sex-Industry Insider (and Concerned Father) Says Enough is Enough. In addition, Reavill wrote several plays produced in off-off-Broadway venues throughout the 1980s.

Many of Reavill's true-crime articles appeared in Maxim from 1998 to 2004. His non-fiction books include Aftermath: Cleaning Up After CSI Goes Home and Raising Our Athletic Daughters: How Sports Can Build Self-Esteem And Save Girls' Lives, penned with his wife Jean Zimmerman.

Beginning in 2002, a writing partnership with Eric Saks yielded the screenplay for the film Dirty and several other optioned or in-development screenplays. Dirty, directed by Chris Fisher, premiered at the 2005 American Film Institute Film Festival in Los Angeles and stars Cuba Gooding, Jr., Clifton Collins, Jr., Wyclef Jean and Taboo of The Black Eyed Peas.

Reavill's ghostwriting collaborations include projects with Terri Irwin, the widow of Steve Irwin (Steve & Me: Life with the Crocodile Hunter), Tiki Barber (Tiki: My Life in the Game and Beyond) and Jerry Heller (Ruthless: A Memoir). He and Zimmerman were credited pseudonymously as Carol Calef on Beyond All Reason: My Life with Susan Smith, David Smith's account of the 1994 murders of his sons, Michael and Alex.

The August 2005 issue of American Songwriter magazine profiled Reavill as a song lyricist.

== List of works ==
As himself:

- Manhattan, with Jean Zimmerman (1994)
- Raising Our Athletic Daughters: How Sports Can Build Self-Esteem And Save Girls' Lives (1998)
- Smut: A Sex-Industry Insider (and Concerned Father) Says Enough is Enough (2005)
- Aftermath: Cleaning Up After CSI Goes Home (2007)
- Mafia Summit: J. Edgar Hoover, the Kennedy Brothers, and the Meeting That Unmasked the Mob (2012)
- Famous Nathan: A Family Saga of Coney Island, the American Dream, and the Search for the Perfect Hot Dog, with Lloyd Handwerker (2016)
- “13” Series of Crime Novels Beginning in 2015, Random House's Alibi imprint e-published Reavill's trilogy featuring Los Angeles County sheriff's detective Layla Remington. The “13” in the titles refers to the common body count in each of the three storylines. The first number in the series, 13 Hollywood Apes, landed a Thriller nomination from the International Thriller Writers organization. It was followed by 13 Stolen Girlsand 13 Under the Wire.
- This Land is no Stranger, with Sarah Hollister (2021)

As a ghostwriter:

- Beyond All Reason: My Life with Susan Smith (1995)
- Ruthless: A Memoir (2007)
- Steve & Me: Life with the Crocodile Hunter (2007)
- Tiki: My Life in the Game and Beyond (2007)
- Eye Wide Open: My Rise, Reign, and Fall in New York Nightlife, by Peter Gatien (2019)
- I’ll Never Change My Name:An Immigrant's American Dream from Ukraine to the USA to Dancing with the Stars, by Val Chmerkovskiy (2018)
- I Only Know Who I Am When I Am Someone Else: My Life On the Street, On the Stage and In the Movies, by Danny Aiello (2014)
