= Baron Herzog =

Hungarian art collector and banker

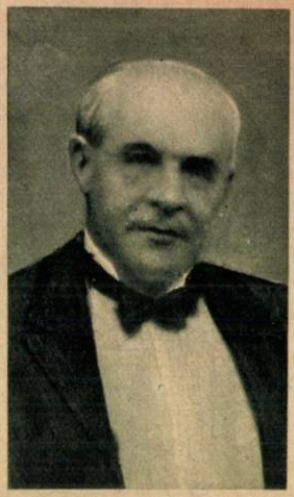
- Born: 1869
- Died: 1933
- Other names: Mór Lipót Herzog, Mór Lipót Herzog de Csete, Baron Mór Lipót Herzog,
- Occupations: art collector, banker
- Known for: largest art collection in Hungary, Holocaust-related art case before United States Supreme Court

Mór Lipót Herzog (1869–1934) was a Jewish Hungarian art collector, banker, and large estate owner whose art collection is the object of Holocaust-related restitution claims.

== Life ==
Herzog, known as Baron Herzog, was born in 1869 in Budapest and was Jewish. He participated in the Sonderbund westdeutscher Kunstfreunde und Künstler.

The artworks from his collection, including paintings by El Greco and Goya, were first confiscated and socialized during the Hungarian Soviet Republic in 1919. They were exhibited in the Hall of Art from 14 June onwards.

He died on 19 November 1934, in Budapest. He was buried at Fiumei Street Cemetery.

He is also known as: Mor Lipot Herzog, Mór Lipót Herzog de Csete, Baron Mór Lipót Herzog, Moriz Leopold Herzog von Csete.

== Art collection ==
Herzog's art collection was the largest in Hungary and contained many masterpieces.

The collection was estimated to contain more than 2,000 artworks, including The Rue Mosnier Dressed with Flags and La Négresse by Manet as well as Francisco de Zurbarán’s portrait of Saint Andrew, The Annunciation to Joachim by Lucas Cranach the Elder (1518)

== Nazi looting and lawsuits for restitution ==
Martha Nierenberg, his granddaughter, tried for many years to recover art looted from the Herzog family.

In 2010, his heirs sued the Hungarian government for the return of more than 40 paintings seized during World War II, valued in excess of US$ 100 million.

The case reached the United States Supreme court as De Csepel et al. v. Republic of Hungary et al.
