= Jens Quistgaard =

Danish sculptor and designer (1919–2008)

Jens Harald Quistgaard
- Born: April 23, 1919
- Died: January 4, 2008 (aged 88)
- Known for: Danish modern decorative arts

Jens Harald Quistgaard (April 23, 1919 – January 4, 2008) was a Danish sculptor and designer, known principally for his work for the American company Dansk Designs, where he was chief designer from 1954 and for the following three decades.

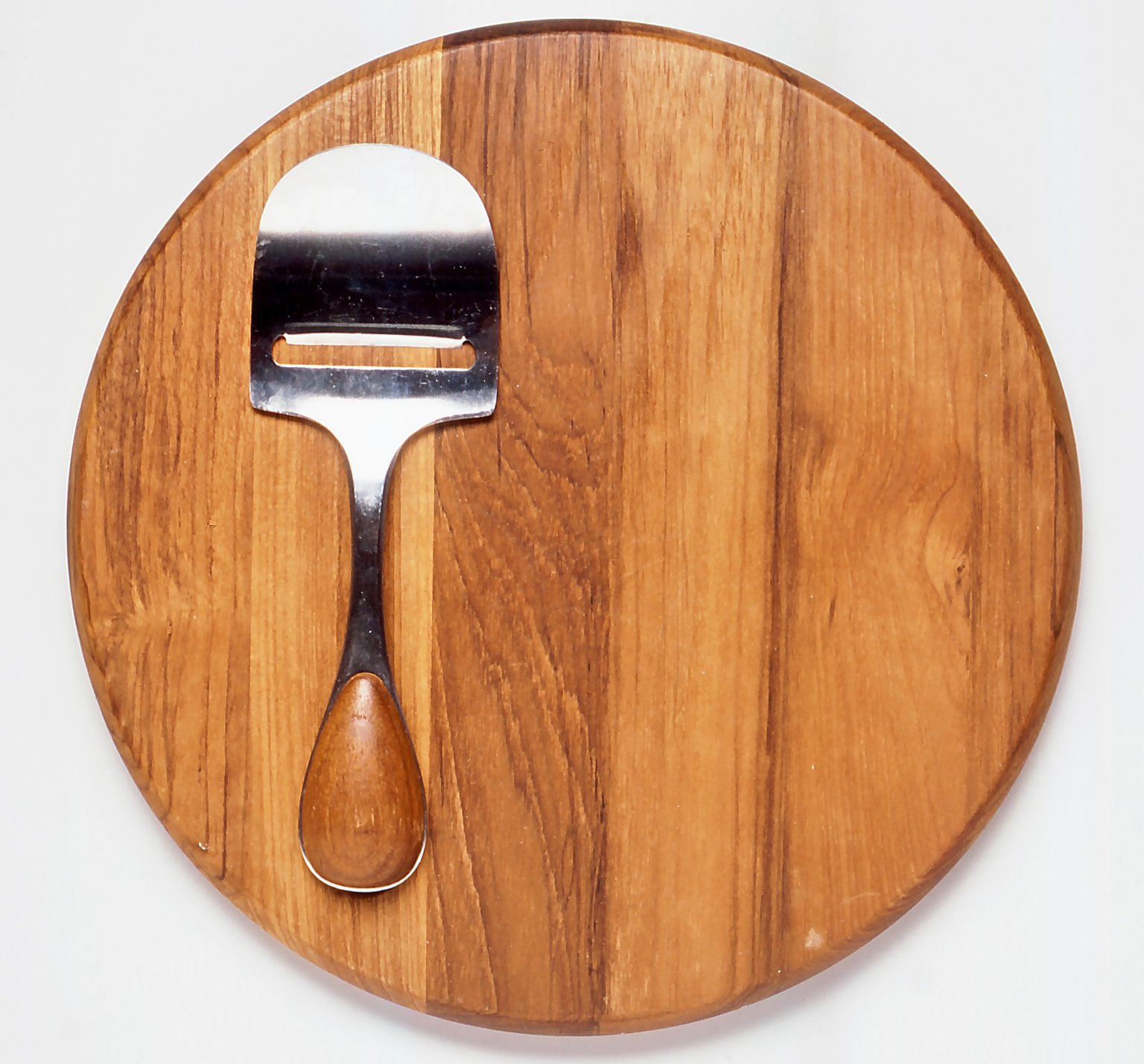
Cheese knife and board attributed to Quistgaard

Though a sculptor and grounded in traditional handicrafts, he quickly established a career as an industrial designer. From the mid-1950s his tableware and kitchenware designs became synonymous with Scandinavian modern and found their way into millions of homes in the US, Europe and Japan. With his international orientation and success he was groundbreaking, and he had great significance for the place which Danish design acquired in the minds of many Americans.

In 1958, he received the Neiman Marcus Award and during the following years he was represented at major museums in Europe and the USA. Many of Jens Quistgaard's works are still produced today.

== Early life and training ==
Jens Quistgaard grew up in an artistic home in Copenhagen and already as a boy, demonstrated unusual artistic talents. The work with handicrafts began in his mother's kitchen, where he made himself a little workshop with vice and anvil. Here he produced jewellery, hunting knives, bags and ceramics. When he was young he would often be found at the village smiths, carpenters or joiners, and it was here he acquired the craftsmanship which he later used to produce models in wood, metal, ceramic and glass. He was trained as a sculptor by his father, Harald Quistgaard (1887–1979), and was later educated as a drawer and silversmith at the technical school in Copenhagen. During the occupation of Denmark he was active in the Resistance movement.

== Work ==
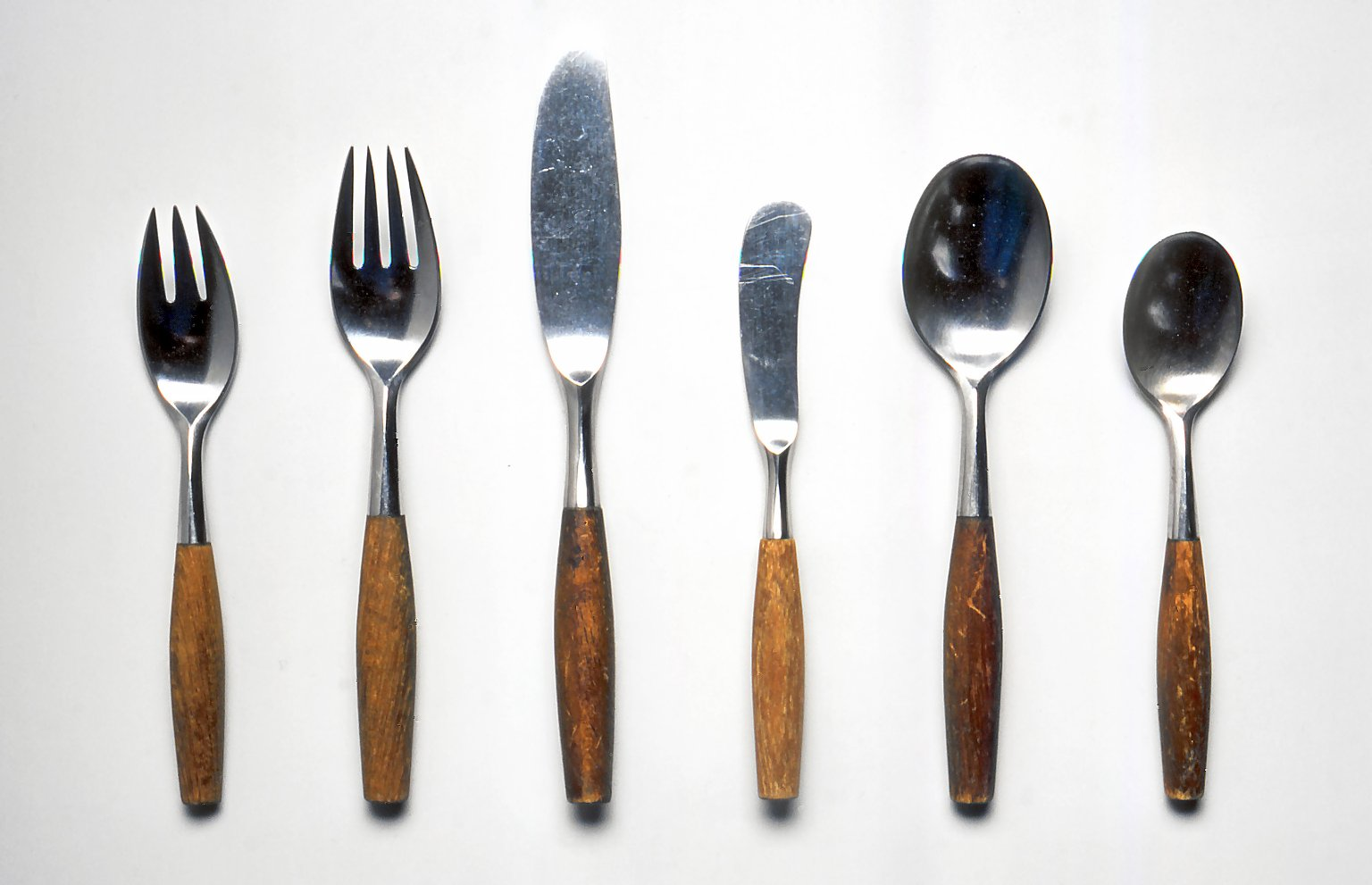
Fjord pattern flatware by Quistgaard

Quistgaard started his career drawing portraits. He also produced jewellery, hunting knives, ceramic works, glass and graphic design in the form of monograms, town arms and the like. At the end of the 1940s his production also included cutlery in silver and steel for different companies, amongst others the silvery cutlery set Champagne (1947 for O.V. Mogensen) and kitchen utensils in steel for Raadvad, including the little shark fin can opener from 1950. His breakthrough as an industrial designer came in 1953–54, where he fashioned the cutlery set Fjord, the first cutlery set that combined stainless steel with handles of teak.

Around the same time he designed a saucepan in cast iron for De Forenede Jernstoeberier A/S (United Iron Foundries). The pan was marketed under the name Anker-Line and was awarded the gold medal at the Triennale in Milan in 1954. In the same year, Quistgaard also received the Lunning Prize. 1954 was also the year American business people Ted Nierenberg and Martha Nierenberg visited Europe, on the lookout for talented design which could be launched in the USA. After having seen the cutlery set Fjord at the Danish Museum of Art and Design in Copenhagen, they sought out the designer, and their meeting led to the foundation of the American company Dansk Designs with Quistgaard as chief designer.

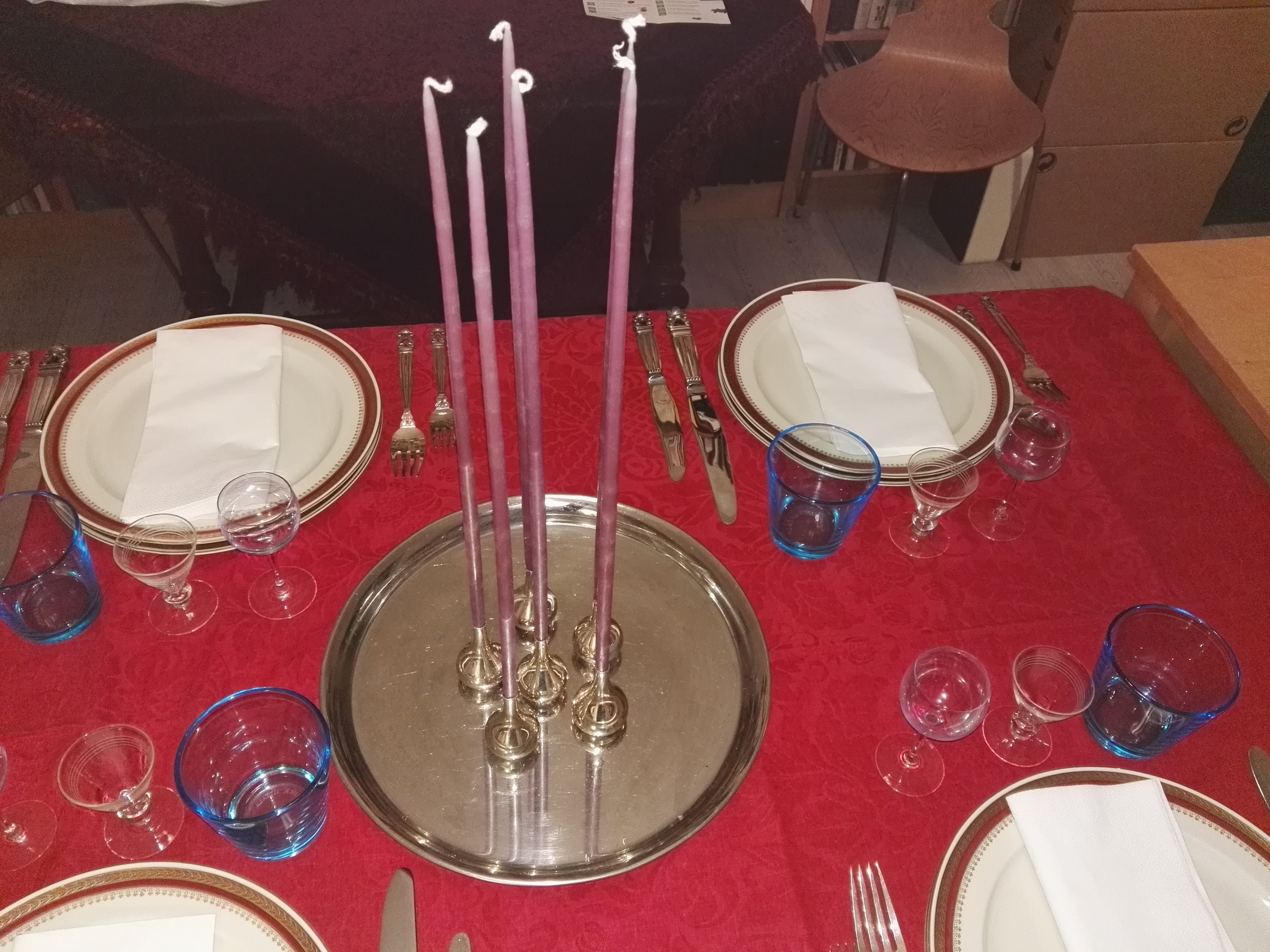
Table setting with Quistgaard's candlesticks in brass

Already towards the end of 1954, Fjord was introduced in New York, followed the year after by the colourful saucepan range Kobenstyle. Quistgaards designs were a big success from the beginning in the US and were quickly followed by a series of tableware and kitchenware designs: cutlery in silver and handcrafted steel; jugs and saucepans in steel, copper and cast iron; crockery in stoneware; glass; trays, bowls, pepper mills and other objects in staved teak and exotic wood sorts, as well as candlesticks in brass, silver and cast iron.

Quistgaard was hugely productive and for Danish Designs alone fashioned more than 4000 products. It is a production which spans a large range of materials and utility items, and which is created from a philosophy that utility items for the kitchen and the table should function together harmoniously. To set the table and arrange with Quistgaard's designs became from the end of the 1950s and during the 1960s identical with "modern living" and Scandinavian style. Where clean lines, sculptural form and natural materials went hand in hand.

== Significant designs and later life ==
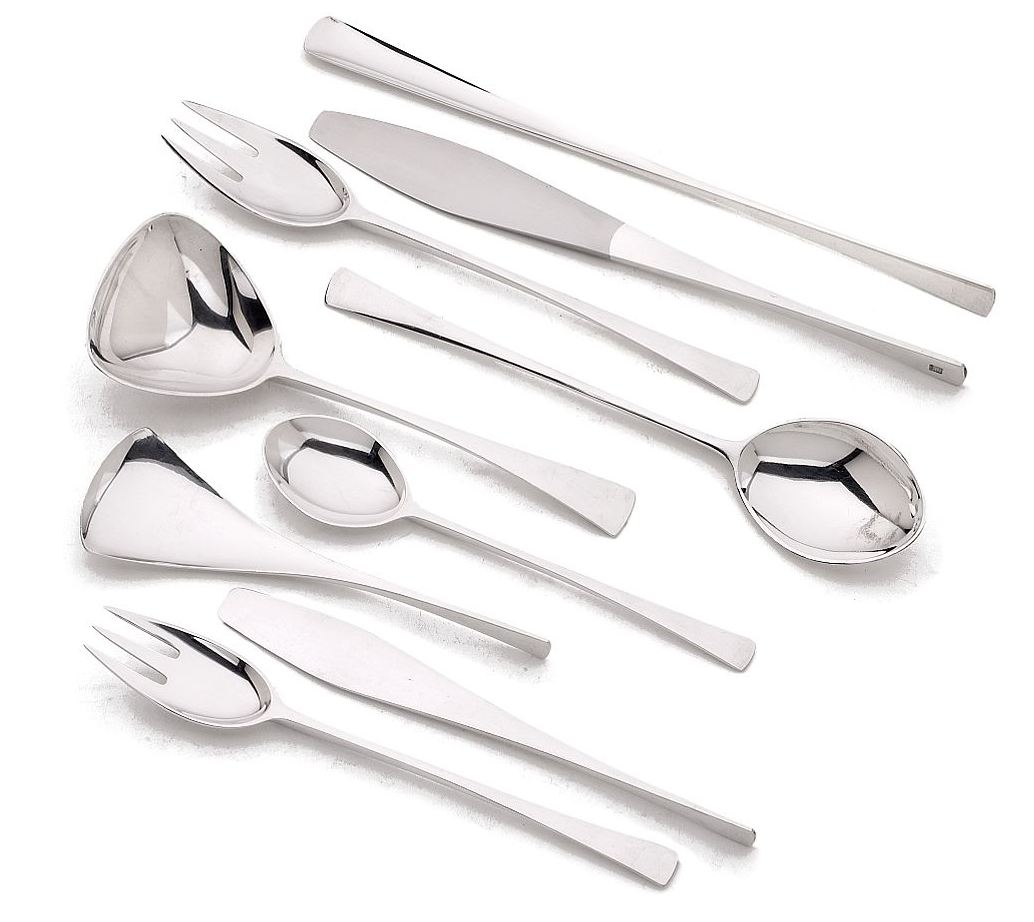
Tjorn flatware

The end of the 1950s and the first half of the 1960s were Quistgaard's most productive years for Dansk Designs. In 1958 he designed the cutlery set Toke in steel and bamboo as well as the dinner set Flamestone in stoneware; the cutlery set Tjorn in sterling silver from 1959, the Festivaal line from 1960 of lacquered bowls and trays in many colors, together with a series of industrial designs in exotic wood sorts, Rare Woods from 1961. The series together with the other woodware was produced by Nissens Woodworking Factory in Denmark, which Quistgaard also designed special works for in the 1960s, amongst others the unusual Stick chair from 1966.

At the end of the 1950s Quistgaard began designing and overseeing the construction of a large villa in Armonk, north of New York, for his American business partner Ted Nierenberg. Quistgaard designed everything, from the large roof constructions and window sections to the doorhandles, bathtub and spiral staircase. The villa was completed in 1961 as a demonstration of Quistgaard's ideal about architectural wholeness.

Quistgaard's success escalated throughout the 1960s. His works for Dansk Designs were marketed in all major cities in the US, but he was also successful in Europe and Japan. Dansk Designs started their own shop in the High Street in Copenhagen, in London and in Stockholm, and Quistgaard's designs were exhibited and sold in Tokyo, Berlin, Paris, Zürich, Melbourne, Johannesburg and many other big cities.

Quistgaard continued as chief designer for Dansk Designs until the start of the 1980s, when he moved to Rome. He lived there until 1993, and returned to Denmark, where he continued to design until a few months before his death in 2008. In 2006 he received an honorary grant from the Danmarks Nationalbank's Anniversary Fund of 1968, and in 2009 was portrayed as a person and as a designer in the documentary film A Saucepan for My Wife.

Quistgaard died at age 88 on January 4, 2008, at his home "Strandgaarden" near Vordingborg, Denmark. He was survived by a daughter, a son and several grandchildren. He is buried in Gimlinge Cemetery.

== Awards and distinctions ==
- Lunning Prize 1954
- Gold and silver medals at Milan Triennial 1954
- The Neiman Marcus Award for Distinguished Service in the Field of Fashion 1958
- Der goldene Löffel, Munich 1962
- Honorary grant from the Danish Central Bank's Anniversary Foundation 2006

== Museums ==
- Designmuseum Danmark, Copenhagen
- The British Museum, London
- Museet på Koldinghus, Kolding, Denmark
- Industrimuseet Frederiks Værk, Frederiksværk, Denmark
- The Victoria and Albert Museum, London
- National Museum, Stockholm;
- MoMA, The Museum of Modern Art, New York City
- The Metropolitan Museum of Art, New York City
- The Cooper-Hewitt National Design Museum, New York City
- The Brooklyn Museum, Brooklyn, New York
- The Philadelphia Museum of Art
- Indianapolis Museum of Art
- The Montreal Museum of Fine Arts
- Denver Art Museum, Colorado
- Das Kunstgewerbemuseum, Berlin
- GRASSI Museum of Applied Arts, Leipzig
- Städtisches Museum, Braunschweig
- Landesmuseum für Kunst und Kulturgeschichte, Oldenburg
- The Louvre, Paris
- Los Angeles County Museum of Art, California
- Museum of Fine Arts, Boston, Massachusetts
- Carnegie Museum of Art, Pittsburgh, Pennsylvania
- Kirkland Museum of Fine & Decorative Art, Denver, Colorado
- Art Institute of Chicago, Illinois
- The RISD Museum, Providence, Rhode Island
- National Gallery of Victoria, Melbourne

== Exhibitions ==
- Charlottenborg spring 1947, 1951–52, 1956
- Milan Triennial 1954
- Habitations nouvelles, Paris 1955
- Annual exhibitions of Danish Arts and Crafts Association, 1940s–60s
- The Lunning Prize Designers' Exhibition, New York 1957
- DH '58: Design for the Home, Brooklyn Museum, March 05 – April 27, 1958
- Danish Arts and Crafts, Stockholm 1959
- The Arts of Denmark, USA 1960–61
- Formes danoises: L'art de l'intérieur au Danemark, Exposition itinérante, Musée des Beaux-Arts, Lyon/Palais de la Bourse, Marseille/Musèe Maison de la Culture, Le Havre/Palais des Beaux-Arts. Lille/Galerie Municipale des Beaux-Arts, Bordeaux, 1964–1965
- Two Centuries of Danish Design, Victoria & Albert Museum, London 1968
- Lerchenborg, separate exhibition 1969
- Masterworks – 100 years of Danish furniture-making, Kronborg 2000
- A Century of Design, Part III, 1950–1975 Metropolitan Museum of Art, 2001
- Danish National Museum, Copenhagen, Images of Denmark, 2002
- Danish Museum of Art and Design, Copenhagen, 2004
- Danmarks Nationalbank, Retrospective exhibition, 2006
- What Was Good Design, MoMA's Message 1944–56, The Museum of Modern Art, New York, May 6, 2009– Jan 10, 2011
- Danish Design – I Like It, Designmuseum Denmark, Copenhagen 2011
- Danish Modern: Design for Living, Goldstein Museum of Design, Minnesota 2014 and Figge Art Museum, Iova 2015
- DANSK – Design by Jens Quistgaard, Retrospective exhibition, HEART Herning Museum of Contemporary Art, 2015–16
- Much More Than One Good Chair, Design & Gesellschaft in Dänemark, Nordische Botschaften, Berlin 2017
- einfach gut. Design aus Dänemark, Wilhelm Wagenfeld Haus, Berlin 2018–19
- The Value of Good Design, MoMA, The Museum of Modern Art, New York, Feb.10-Jun.15, 2019
- Scandinavian Design and the United States, 1890–1980, Milwaukee Art Museum, Wisconsin, 2020
- 3Days of Design Exhibition "A seat at the table" developed by Form Portfolios, with Stig Guldberg and Henriette Quistgaard, Copenhagen, 2024

== Selected works ==
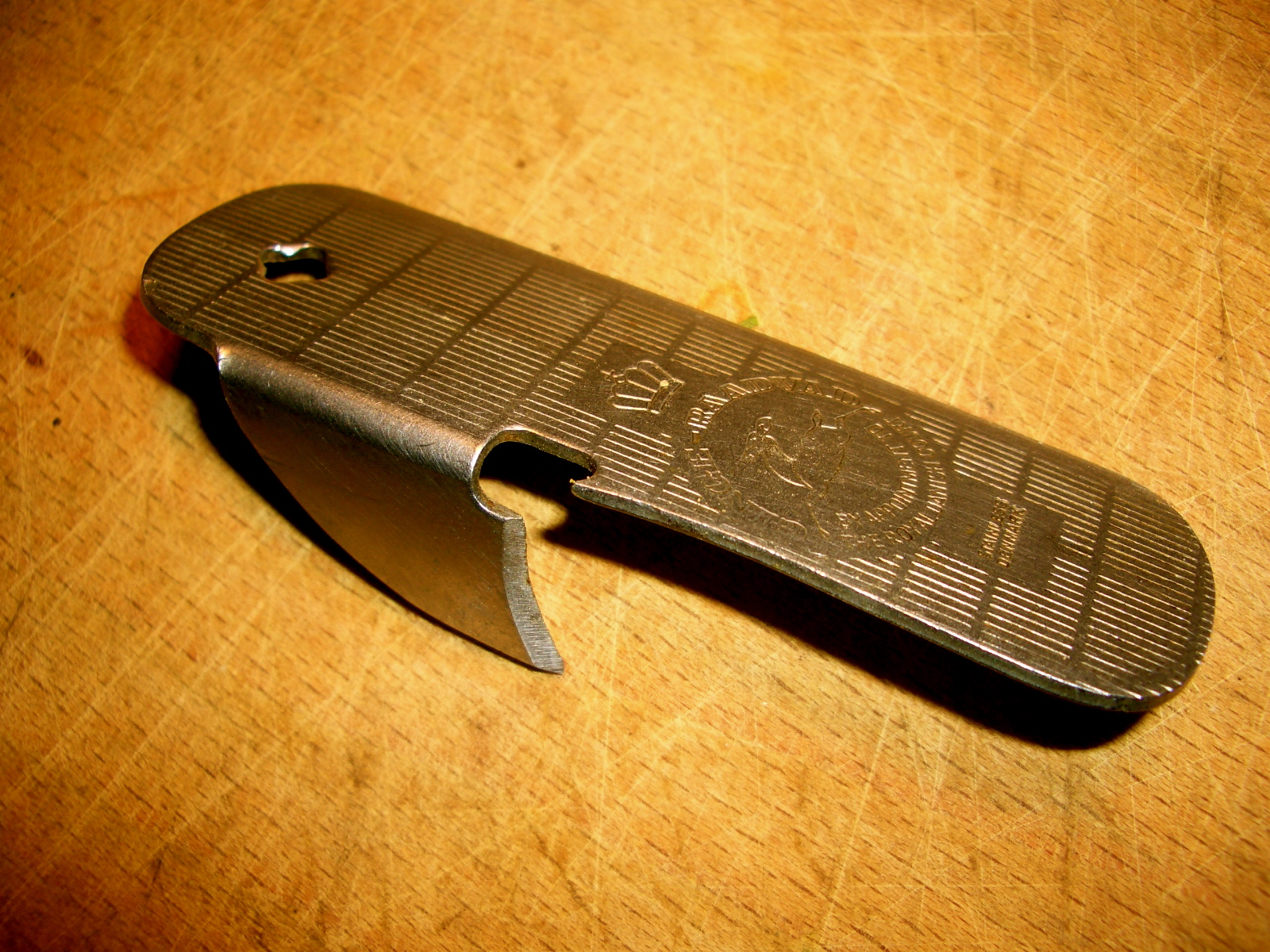
'Shark fin' can opener (1950)

- Champagne flatware. Silver. O.V. Mogensen 1947
- Tea set and coffee set. Sterling silver, handwrought. Hermann Jacobsen o. 1948
- Teapot, unglazed earthenware. Palshus Keramik 1949–50
- Shark fin can opener. Stainless steel. Raadvad A/S 1950
- Fjord flatware. Handforged stainless steel and teak, Dansk Designs 1954
- Ankerline kitchenware. Enameled cast iron. De Forenede Jernstøberier 1954
- Kobenstyle kitchenware. Enamel on steel. Dansk Designs 1955
- Candle holders, brass. Dansk Designs 1956
- Ice bucket, teak. Dansk Designs 1958
- Flamestone dinnerware, fluted stoneware. Dansk Designs 1958
- Variation V flatware. Handforged stainless steel. Dansk Designs 1957
- Toke flatware. Handforged stainless steel and bamboo. Dansk Designs 1958
- Tjorn flatware. Sterling silver. Dansk Designs 1959
- Relief. Stoneware. Kronjyden 1969-60
- Festivaal table top collection. Lacquer on maple. Dansk Designs 1960
- House for Ted Nierenberg, Armonk, New York 1961
- Rare Wood table top collection. Trays, bowls, ice buckets, pepper mills. Dansk Designs 1961
- Flamestone dinnerware, smooth stoneware. Dansk Designs 1964
- Stick Chair, Brazilian rosewood, chromed steel and leather. Nissen, Langaa 1966
- Simplicity barware. Glass. Dansk Designs 1967
- Jette flatware. Handforged stainless steel, Dansk Designs 1968

== Literature ==
- Bagner, Alex: Hide and teak, i: Wallpaper*, October 2008, s. 128–134
- Eidelberg, Martin (Ed.): Design 1935–1965. What Modern Was, New York: Harry N Abrams 1991. ISBN 0-8109-2480-3
- Byars, Mel: The Design Encyclopedia, New York: The Museum of Modern Art 2004. | ISBN 0-87070-012-X
- Fiell, Charlotte and Peter: Scandinavian Design, Köln: Taschen 2002. ISBN 3-8228-2178-0
- Fiell, Charlotte and Peter (Eds): 60s Decorative Art, Köln: Taschen 2000. ISBN 3-8228-6405-6
- FORM – fra tønder til trend, Kulturhistorisk Museum Randers, u.å.
- Fox, Margalit ("Jens Quistgaard, 88, a Designer of Popular Tableware, Is Dead". New York Times (2008-02-02).
- Guldberg, Stig: Jens Quistgaard – The Man Who Put Danish Modern on America's Tables, i: Modernism Magazine, Spring 2011
- Guldberg, Stig: The Sculptor Who Put Danish Modern on the Map, i: DANSK – Design by Jens Quistgaard, HEART – Herning Museum of Contemporary Art, 2015
- Koelln, Georgann. "Prolific Tableware Designer Has Introduced 2,000 Styles", The Blade (newspaper), October 17, 1982.
- New Technologies. Phaidon Design Classics, Volume Three, Phaidon 2006.
- Perlson, Mark: Danish Pepper. Jens Quistgaard's Teak Pepper Mills, 2008. ISBN 978-1438214740
- Reif, Rita. "Accessories Designed by Dane Proving Popular in U.S. Homes; Jens Quistgaard, Son of Noted Sculptor, a Born Craftsman", The New York Times, October 10, 1958.
- The New York Times, September 22, 1961

== Film ==
The Designer Jens Quistgaard: A Saucepan for My Wife. A Documentary Film by Stig Guldberg. DVD + booklet 55 p. ABCFilm, Denmark 2009. ISBN 978-87-7955-771-0

== See also ==
- Dansk International Designs
- Danish modern
- Scandinavian design
