= Dansk Designs =

American cookware company

- Primary logo
- Formerly: Dansk International Designs (1974-2010s)
- Company type: Private
- Industry: Retail
- Founded: 1954; 72 years ago in Great Neck, New York, United States
- Founders: Martha Nierenberg; Ted Nierenberg
- Headquarters: Providence, Rhode Island
- Area served: United States
- Products: Cookware, tableware, home accessories
- Owner: Form Portfolios (2026-Present)
- Website: www.dansk.com

Dansk Designs (colloquially known as Dansk) is an American brand known for its wood serving pieces, brightly-colored enameled steel cookware, and oftentimes sculptural dinnerware and accessories. As of 2026, it is based in Providence, Rhode Island. The company is among several credited for introducing the Danish Modern movement to American households. Dansk is the Danish word for Danish.

== History ==
On a honeymoon to Europe in 1954, American couple Martha and Ted Nierenberg went in search of high-quality applied or industrial products to base a new business aimed at a domestic U.S. audience. After not seeing any designs they liked while touring industrial fairs in Portugal and Italy, they then headed north, and although they again found no products, they were impressed by the quality of the steel and manufacturing techniques coming out of metal factories in Solingen, Germany. The Nierenbergs decided to tour Scandinavia and during a visit to the Museum of Arts and Crafts Kunsthandwaerkmuseet (today the Danish Museum of Art & Design) in Copenhagen, they saw an unusual set of cutlery on display that combined Siamese teak and stainless steel, created by young artist-designer Jens Quistgaard.

The museum called Quistgaard, who dismissed the phone call, saying he was "knee-deep in plaster" and to try again tomorrow. Ten minutes later, the adamant Nierenbergs knocked on Quistgaard's studio door and they were answered by a busy Quistgaard with his studio covered in plaster and dust. Quistgaard laid down paper for the couple to sit without smearing their clothes and the Nierenbergs spoke with him in an effort to persuade him to manufacture the cutlery they saw in the Kunsthandwaerkmuseet. At first, Quistgaard insisted that, although winning a competition prize that placed it in the museum, the pieces could only be forged by hand, one piece at a time, and it was for that reason that nobody in Denmark would produce it. But after seeing techniques in Solingen, the Nierenbergs were able to convince him they knew where the complex design could be mass-produced, leading to Dansk Designs' first product, Fjord flatware, which has been one of the brand's enduring bestsellers.

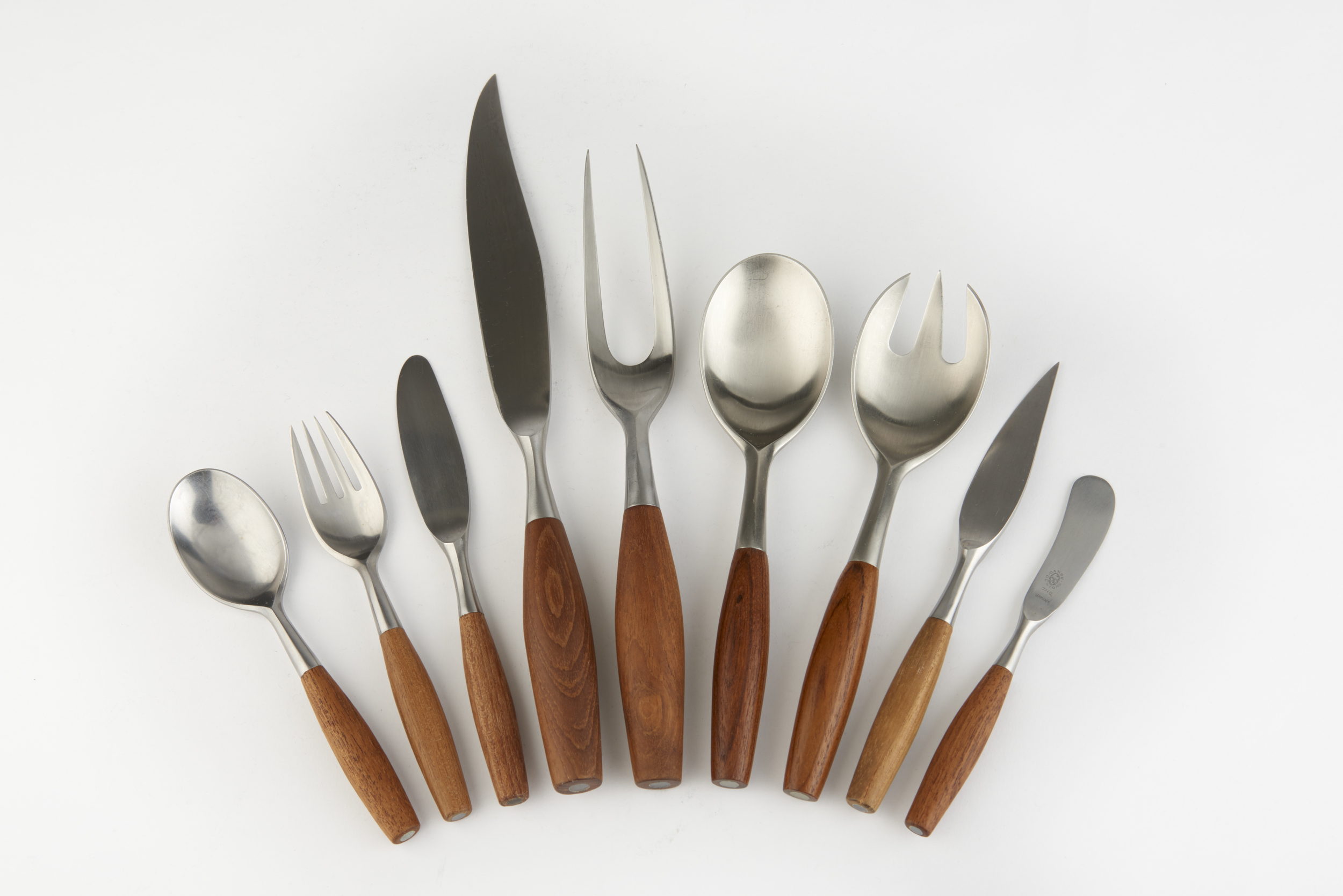
The Dansk Fjord flatware designed in 1953 by Jens Quistgaard

The Nierenbergs established Dansk that year in their home's garage in Great Neck, New York, with Quistgaard as its "Chief Designer", a role he held for three decades. The name was devised when Ted Nierengard suggested they call the new company 'Danish Design', Jens Quistgaard pushed back and said “Call it ‘Dansk Designs', because ‘Dansk’ is like when you sell vodka in the U.S.A., you use its Russian name...”. After Quistgaard designed a new enameled cookware line called 'Købenstyle' in 1955, Ted Nierenberg attracted orders for several hundred units from stores all around the United States, and the business took off from there. By 1958, Nierenberg and Quistgaard had expanded Dansk's wares to include stainless steel flatware, porcelain serveware, stoneware casseroles, wood stools and nutcrackers, and ice buckets made of teak.

In the 1960s, Dansk relocated its headquarters to Mount Kisco, New York to expand its headquarters. The New York Times credited Dansk with "creating a stir" with "some of the most popular accessories found in American homes." Over the next few decades, Dansk further grew its product line by collaborating with designers Niels Refsgaard, Jack Lenor Larsen, Vivianna Torun Bülow-Hübe, Ritva Puotila, Lorenzo Porcelli, and Gunnar Cyrén. Dansk became one of the most successful brands to import Danish Modern designs into the kitchens and dining rooms of middle class Americans. By the early 1980s, Quistgaard had created more than 4,000 different designs for the American company ranging from ceramics, glassware, metalware and other items for the home.

Dansk was purchased in June 1985 by Dansk Acquisition Corp. in a deal initiated by Goldman Sachs.

Dansk ownership was again transferred in 1991 to the Brown-Forman Corporation for $70 million and incorporated under its Lenox subsidiary. During the 2000s, Lenox commissioned Michael Graves to design over 160 new Dansk products as well as revised graphics and marketing imagery to "bring a more youthful contemporary style" to the mid-century brand. After the 2008 financial crisis, a group of investors led by Clarion Capital Partners LLC purchased the assets of Lenox—including Dansk—and renamed the company Lenox Corporation in 2009 and moved the Dansk headquarters to Bristol, Pennsylvania. Dansk continued as a brand of Lenox until the COVID-19 pandemic, which caused Lenox to shutter all warehouses, outlet stores, and its only remaining U.S. factory in 2020.

In 2021, Dansk was acquired by Food52 with plans to revive the brand and relocated its headquarters to New York City. On December 29, 2025, parent company Food52 filed for Chapter 11 bankruptcy protection as part of an agreement to sell itself and its assets.

Dansk was sold to design licensing agency Form Portfolios for $250,000. The new owner announced plans for releasing limited runs of Dansk's design archive, some of which have never been produced. Form Portfolios has offices in Providence, Rhode Island, USA and in Copenhagen, Denmark.

== Designs & Production ==
=== Manufacturing ===
Novel production techniques were employed to take many of Quistgaard's designs to the mass market, particularly his metal and wood pieces, which were often unusual and playful in form. Instead of carving out of solid wood, which would have been prohibitively expensive, smaller wood blocks were connected with a staving technique, which were reenforced with a new type of epoxy glue. This became a common design element of Dansk and resulted in woodware that was less prone to cracking from repeated moisture exposure and Quistgaard could chose to hide or expose the end grain faces depending on the appropriate use of the object. The enameled pickled-steel plating of the Købenstyle line features flowing and sculpted profiles usually only seen at the time in much thicker and heavier cast iron cookware. Købenstyle utilizes pin point wielding where the distinctive curved handles meet the rounded body. This greatly minimized the transfer of heat from the body of the pot or pan to the handles, allowing the possibility of handling the piece without pot holders from a stovetop. The same handles, also seen on the lids of Købenstyle pot and casserole pieces, also serves as a trivet and table protector when serving. Dansk designs are recognized for their artistic merit with examples held in the collections of the Metropolitan Museum of Art, the Museum of Modern Art, the Victoria & Albert Museum, The Louvre, the Cooper-Hewitt, National Design Museum, the Brooklyn Museum, and the Herning Museum of Contemporary Art in Denmark.

Until 1965, Dansk products were manufactured in Denmark or Germany with later production moving to France until the late 1970s. From the 1970s to the early 2000s, various products were manufactured in Portugal, Finland, Norway, Korea, Romania, and Japan. Most contemporary Dansk re-issues are made in Thailand, Malaysia, Philippines, China, and India.

Because of the many instances of Dansk changing ownership and relocating during its history, some of the company's design archive was lost and still remains incomplete. Recent efforts by Dansk, museums, and private collectors have focused on rebuilding knowledge of legacy products and data. This is further complicated by the fact that Quistgaard did not document how many total objects were designed within a given product line, and didn't find keeping dates of designs as important. Many of his pieces, particularly the peppermills, were never given names and Dansk assigned them non-consecutive product numbers. The total number of objects Dansk designed and produced remains unknown.

=== Markings ===
Dansk products typically have the initials or shorthand name of the designer etched, stamped, painted, or engraved on the bottom of the object. This way of crediting the designer was a tradition started for Jens Quistgaard and has become a standard for almost all Dansk products.

Maker's Mark
Marking	Creator Name
BAS	(unknown)
BS	(unknown)
BV	Bertilli Vallieni
DT	(unknown)
GC	Gunnar Cyrén
Graves Studio	Michael Graves
IHQ	Jens Quistgaard
JHQ	Jens Quistgaard
JLL	Jack Lenor Larsen
JS	Jay Slifer
KR	(james) Klein (david) Reid
KW	Kathleen Wills
LP	Lorenzo Porcelli
MD	(unknown)
NR	Niels Refsgaard
RP	Ritva Puotila
Studio Levien	Robin Levien
Torun	Vivianna Torun Bülow-Hübe
VRM	Victoria Rush Morrison

=== Gallery ===
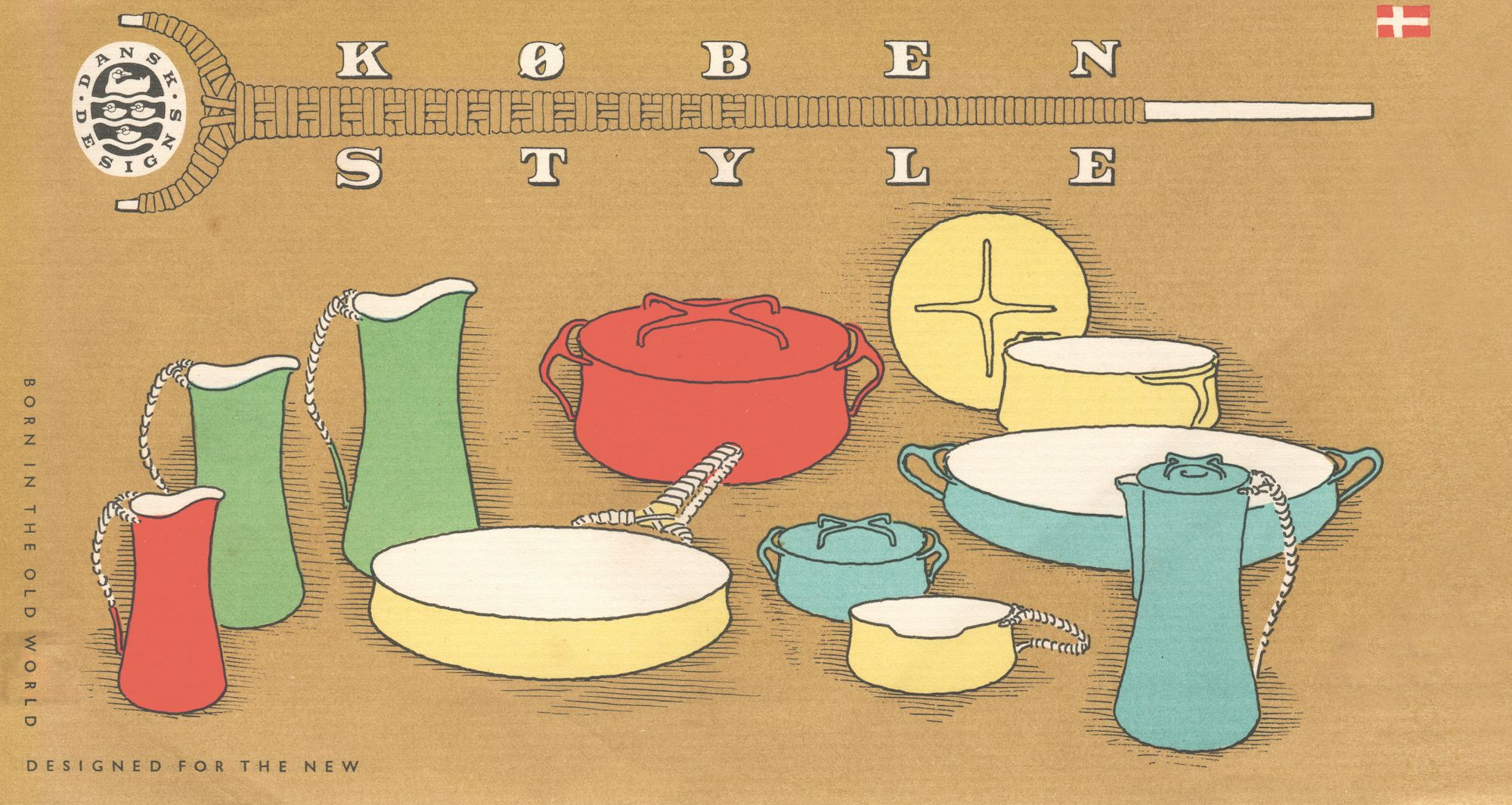
Købenstyle illustration, 1955

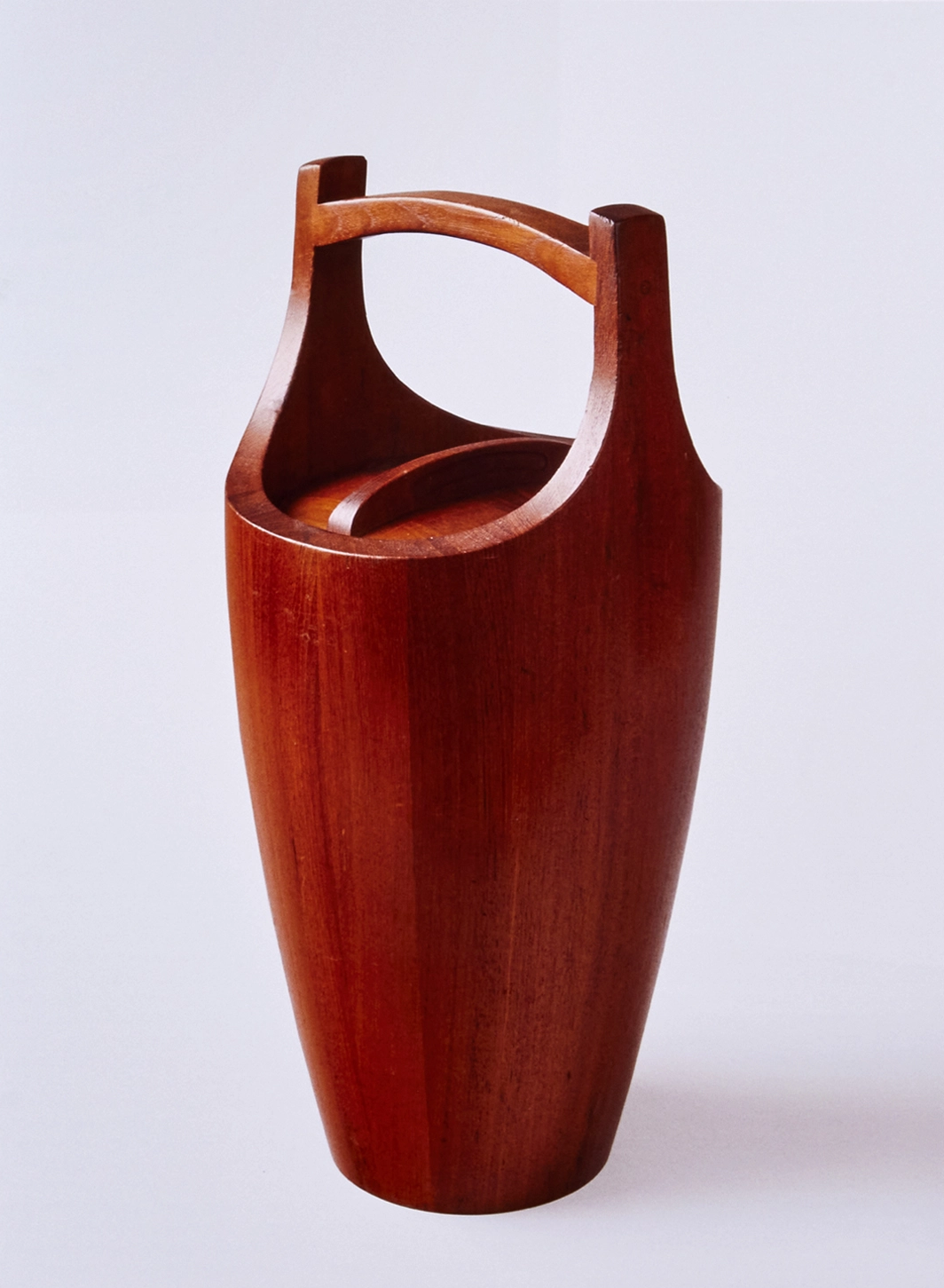
Ice bucket, 1957

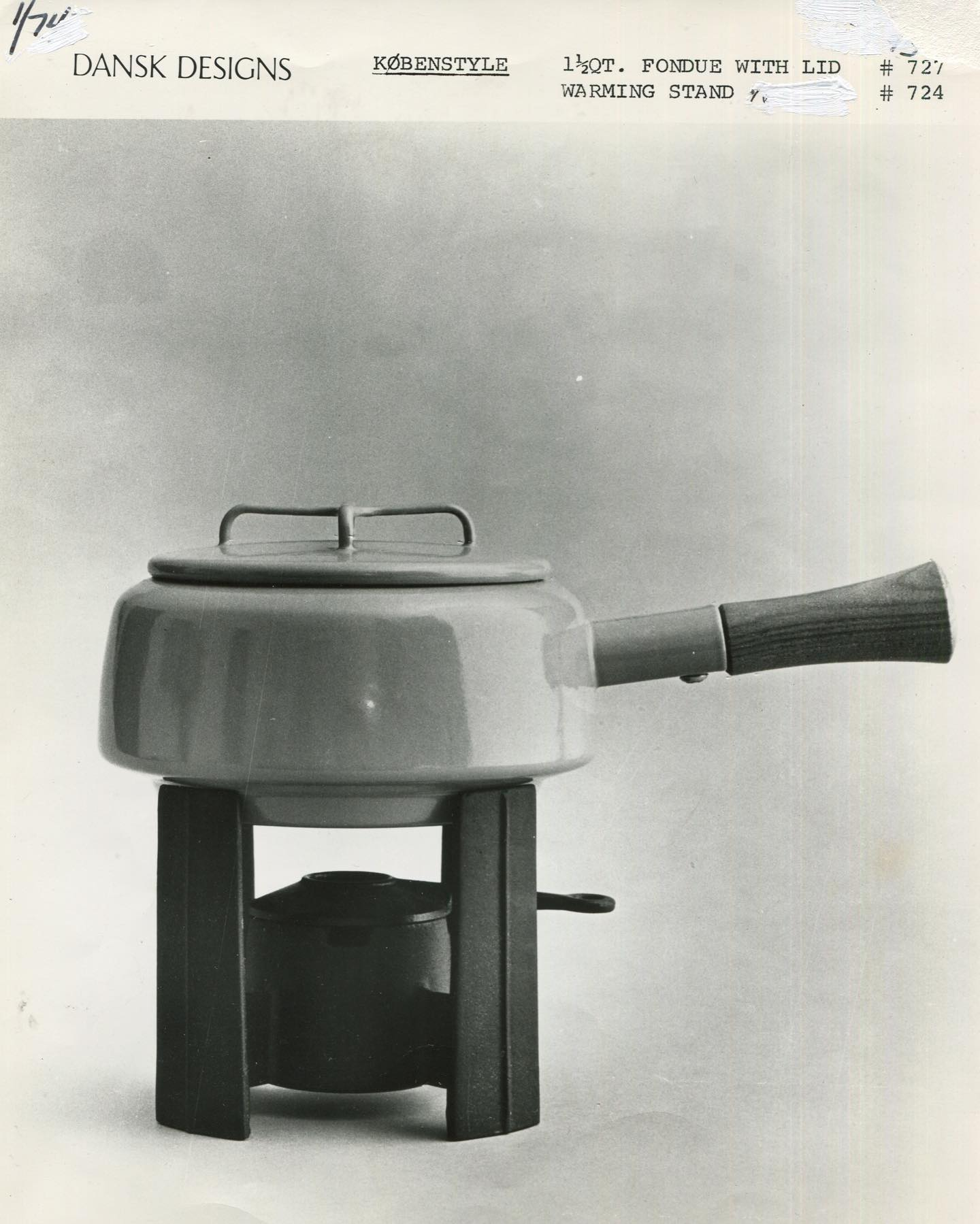
Købenstyle fondue set, 1960s

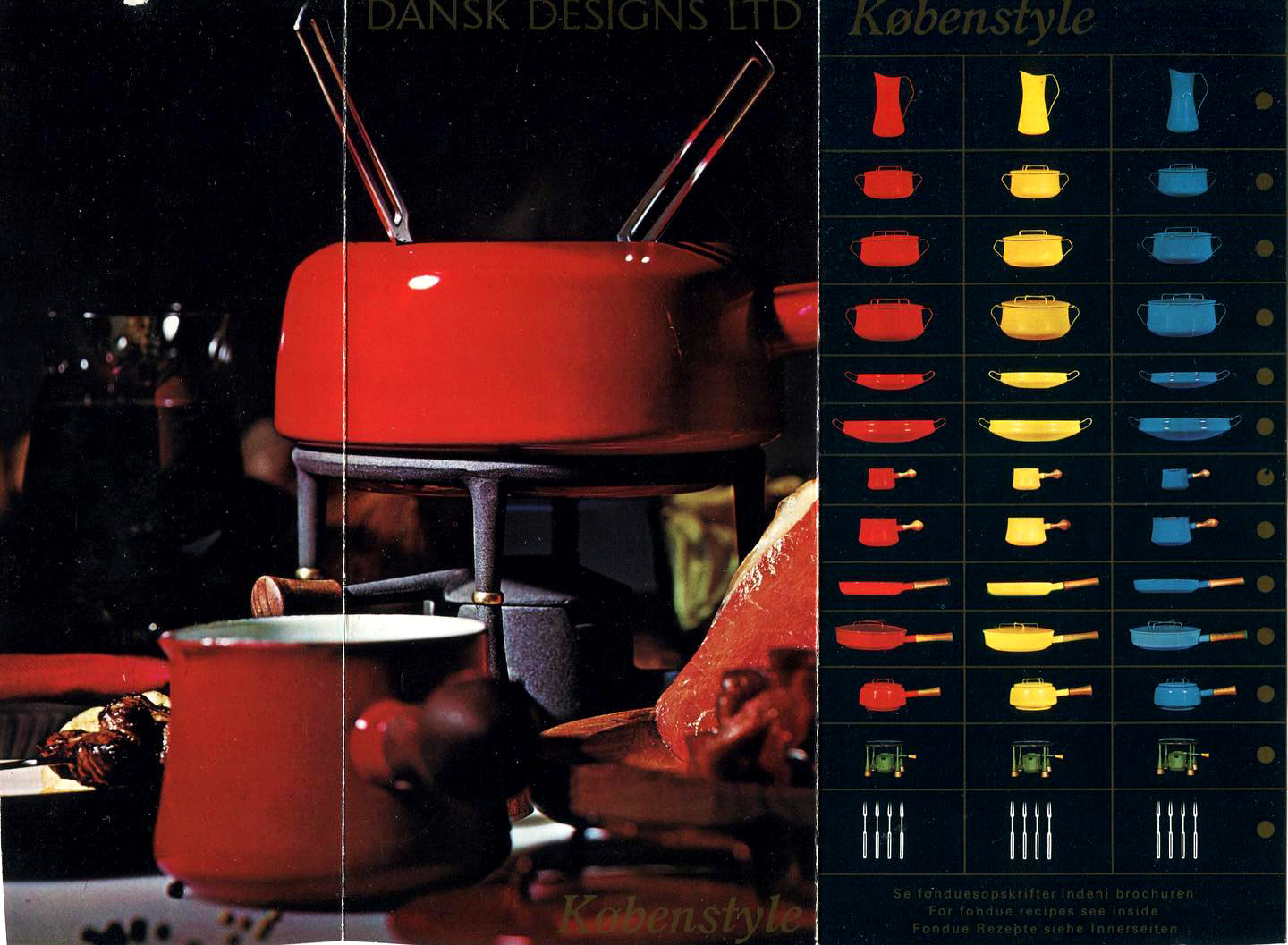
Købenstyle colorways, 1960s

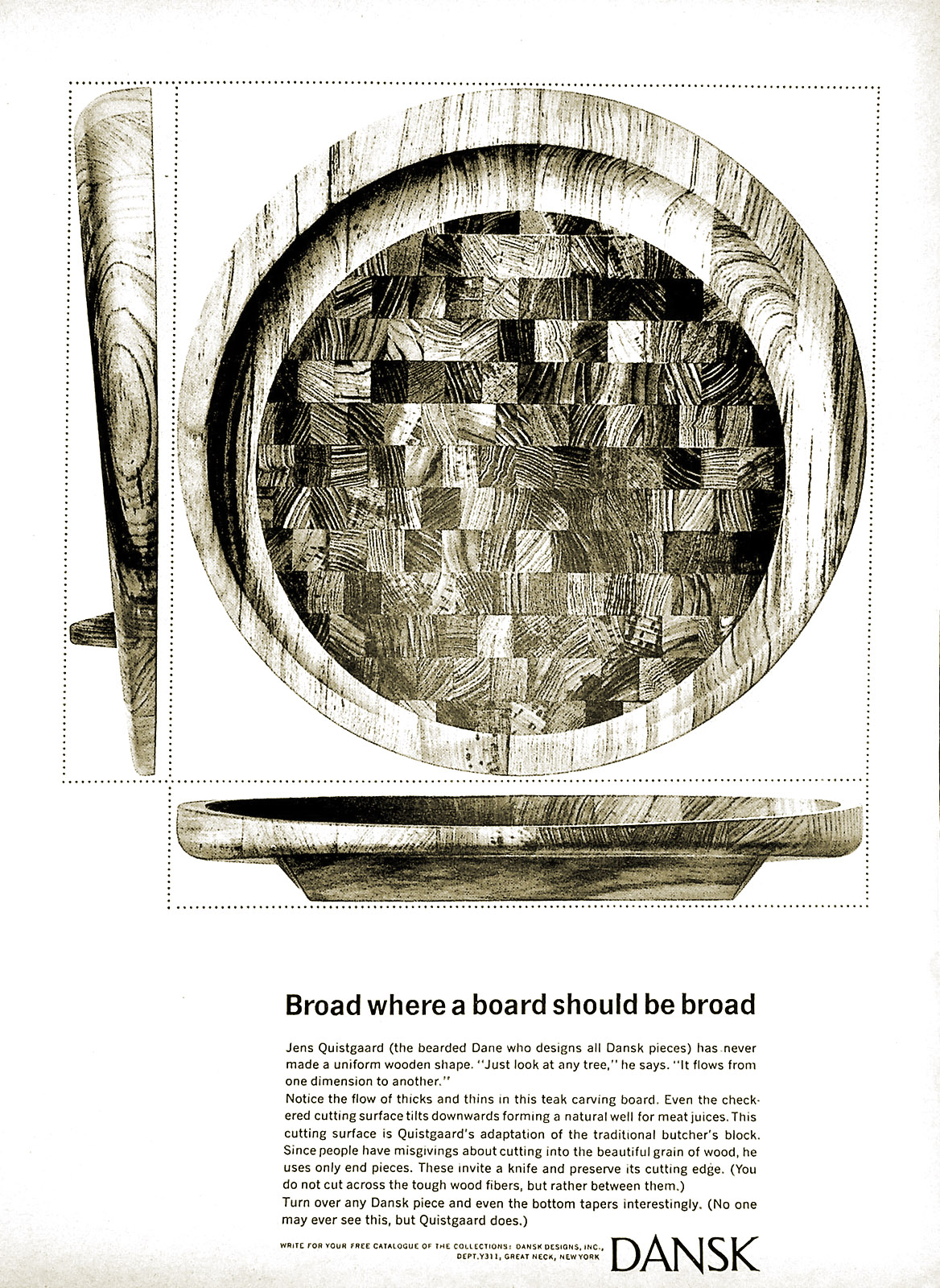
Carving board ad, 1961

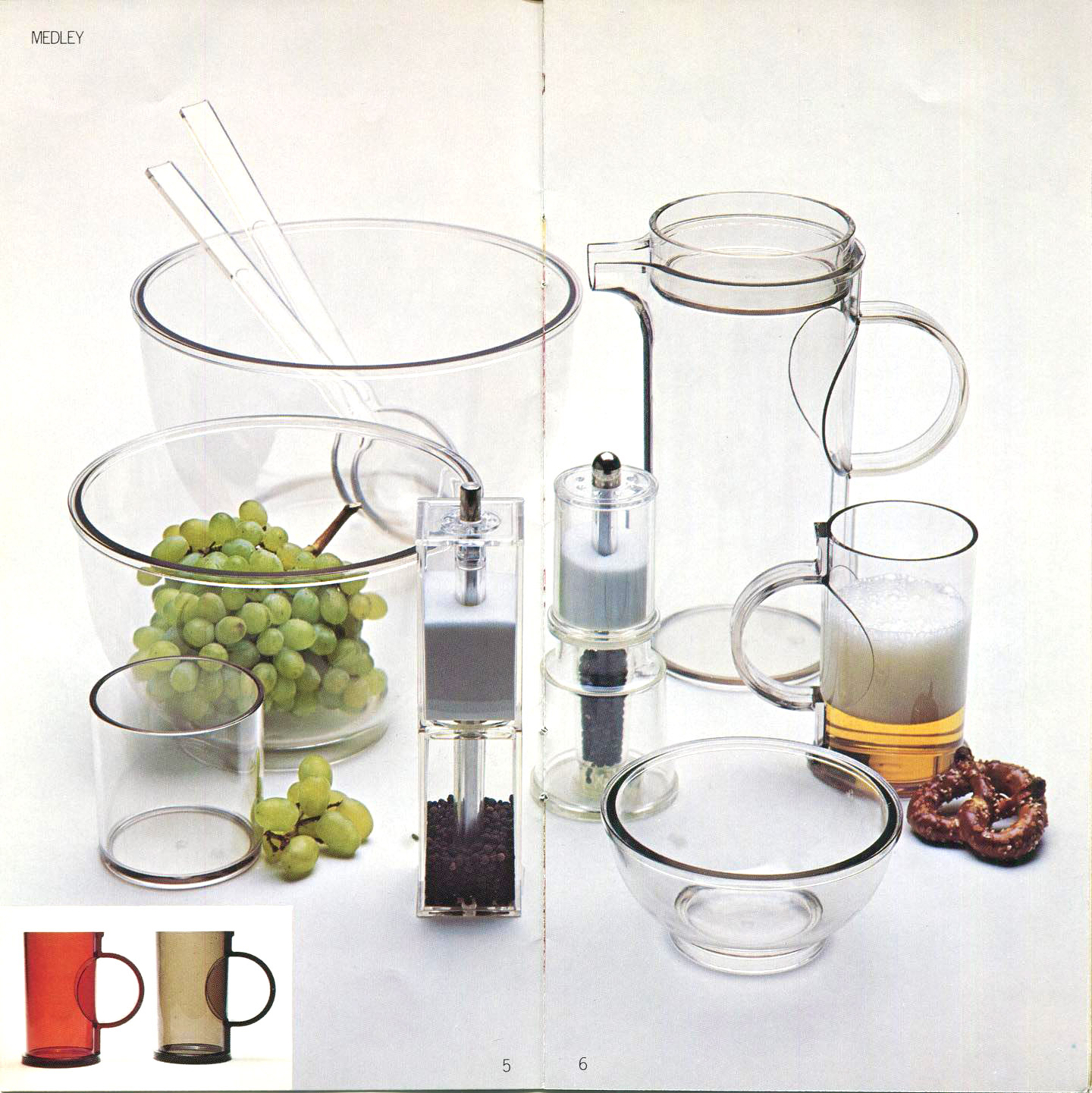
Medley line by Gunnar Cyrén, 1968

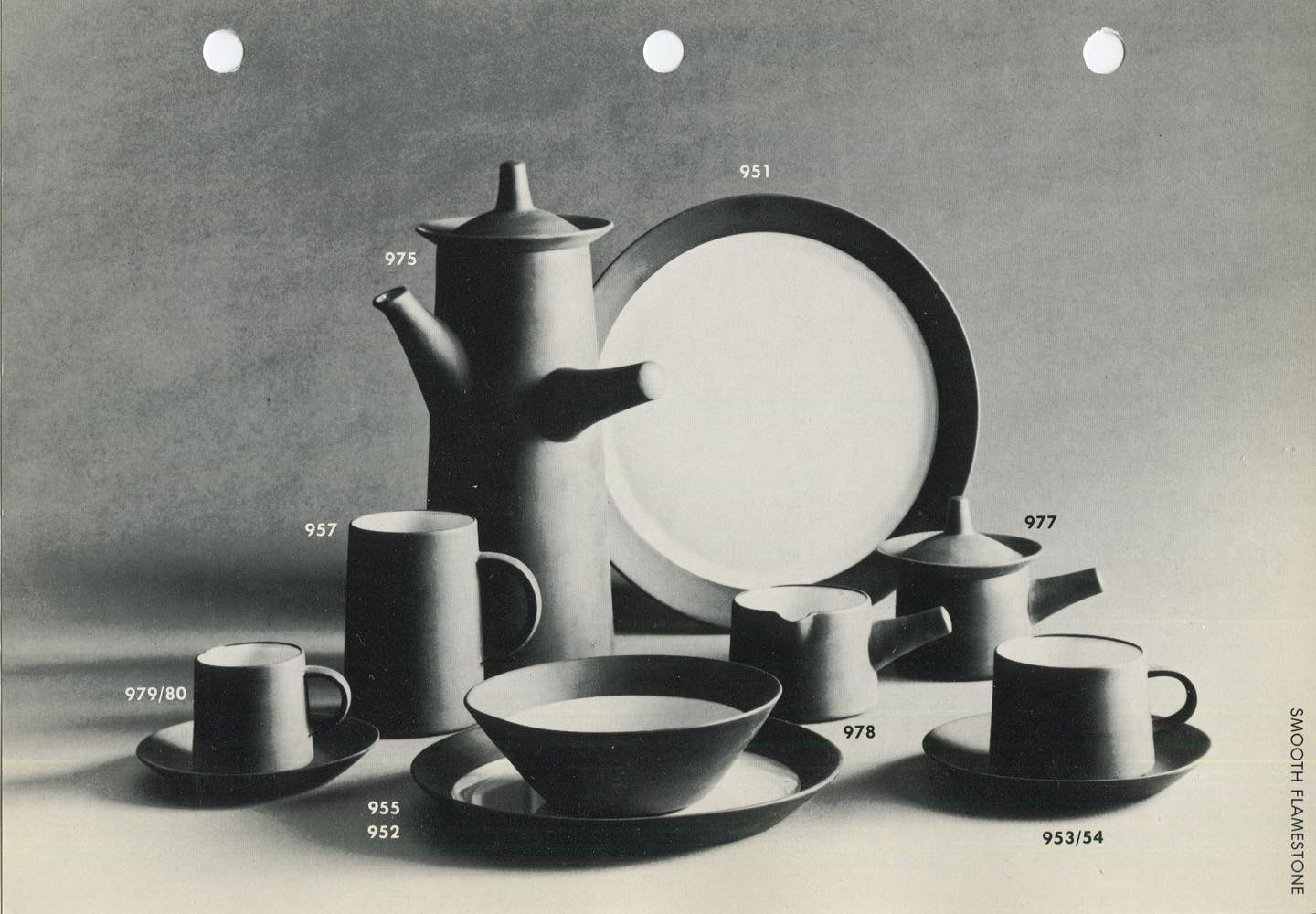
Flamestone set, 1960s

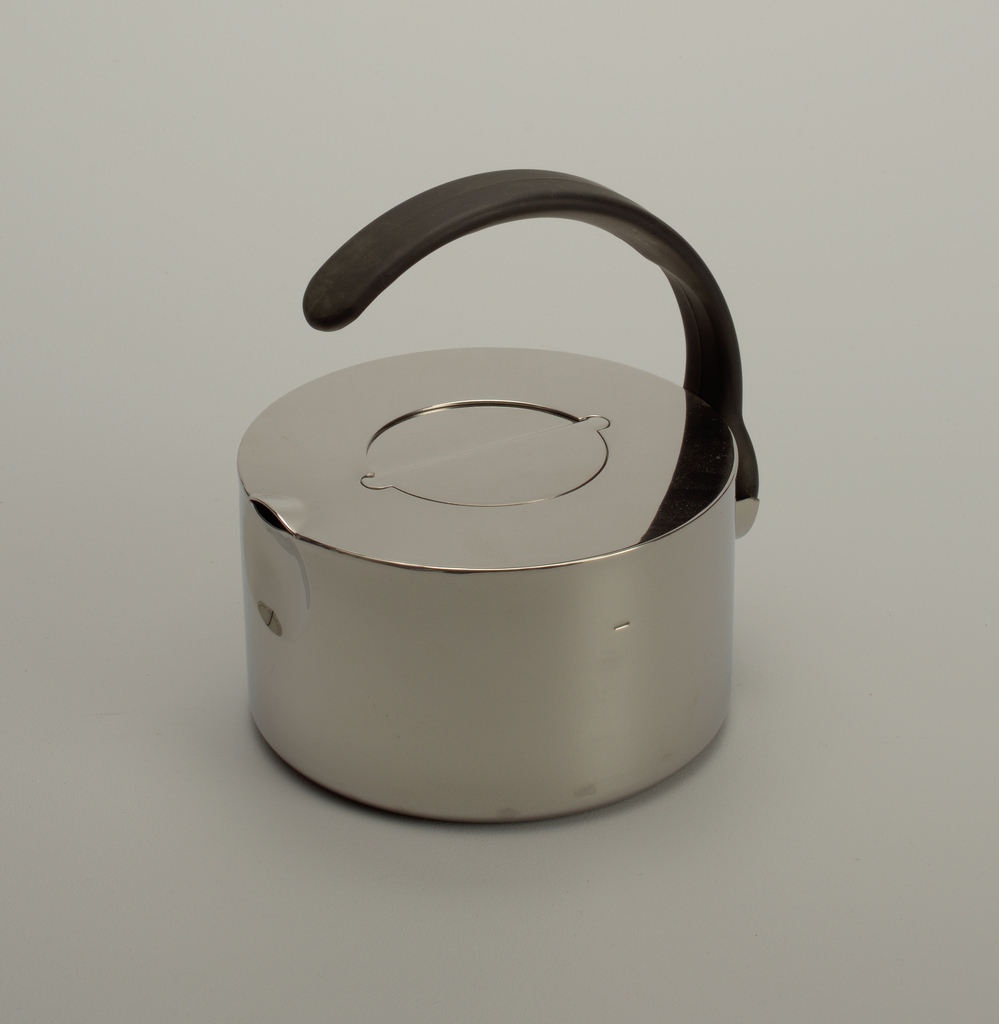
Kettle by Lorenzo Porcelli, 1980

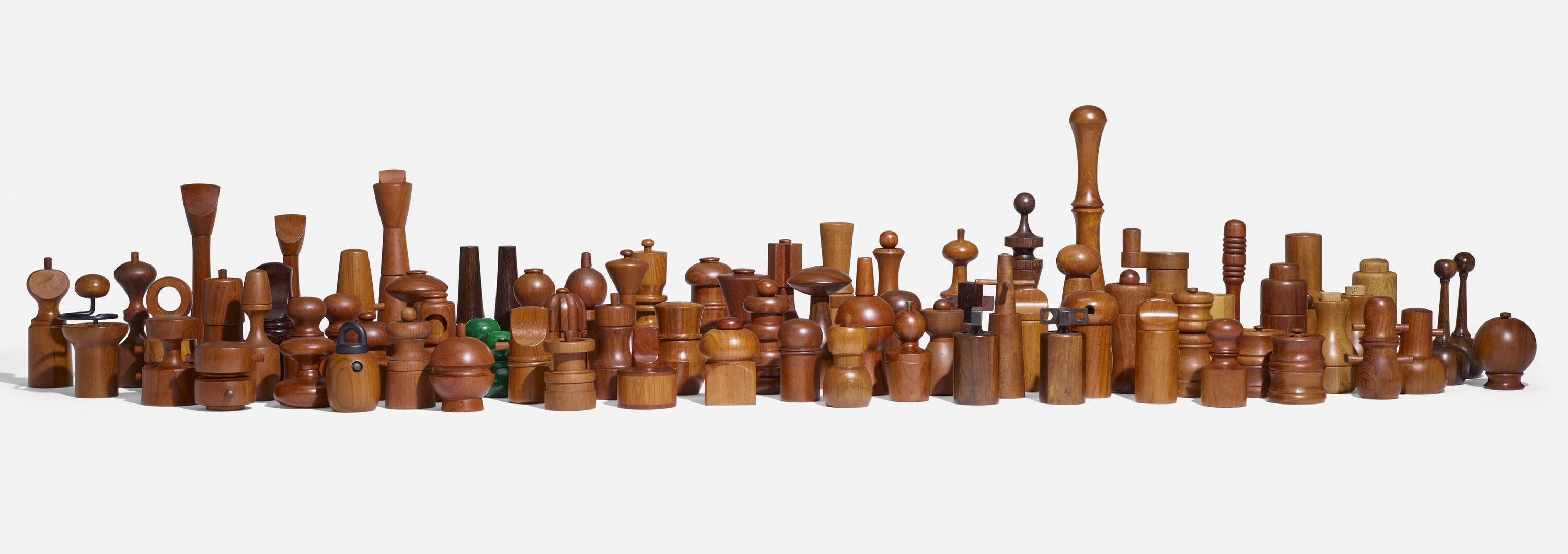
Peppermill and Salt Shaker designs, 1950s-1970s

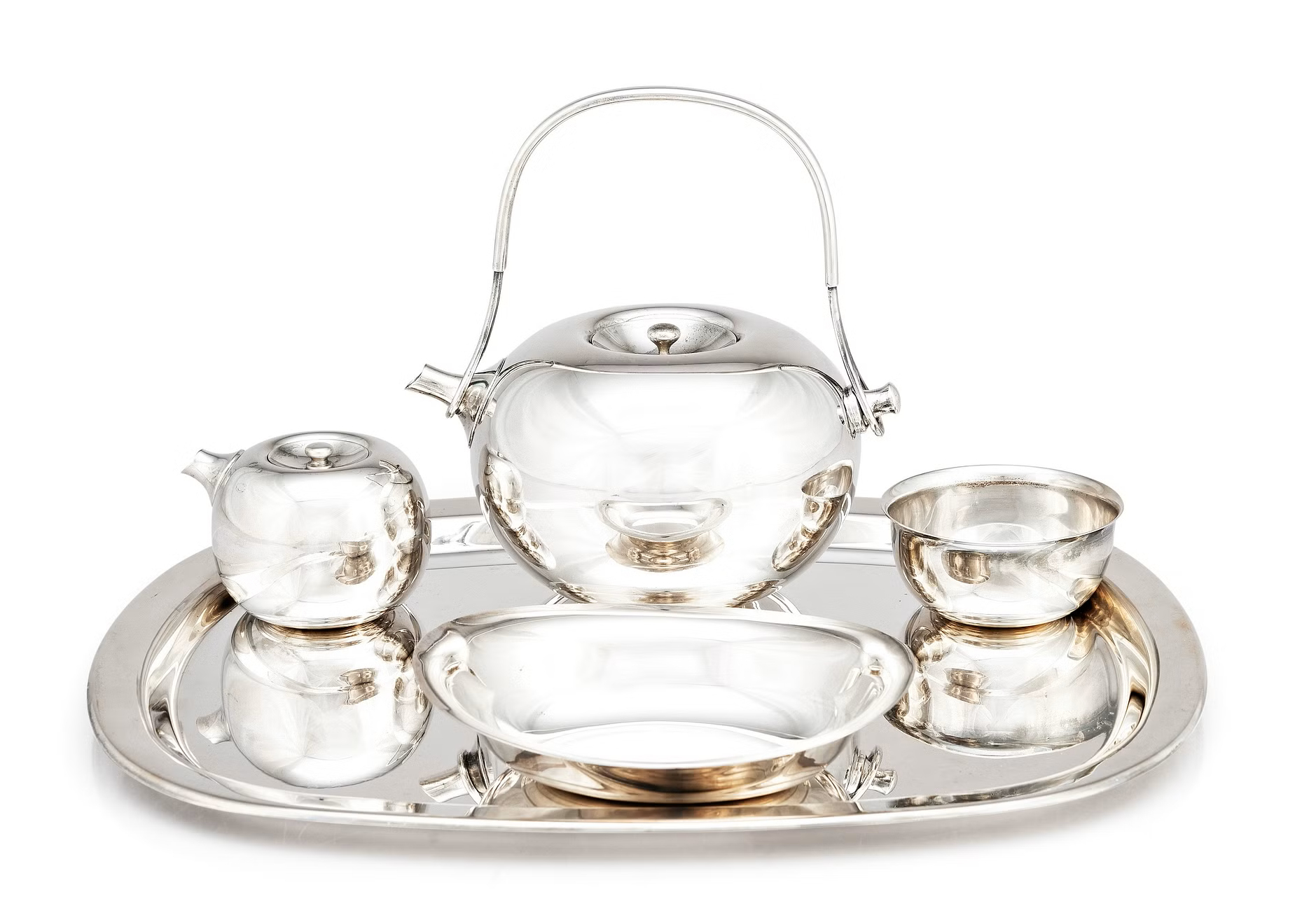
Silver-plated brass set by Vivianna Torun Bülow-Hübe, 1960
