= Work in Progress (book) =

1999 book by Michael Eisner

Work in Progress: Risking Failure, Surviving Success
- Author: Michael Eisner, Tony Schwartz
- Language: English
- Publisher: Hyperion Books
- Publication date: September 15, 1999
- Publication place: United States
- Pages: 464
- ISBN: 978-0375500718

Work in Progress is a nonfiction book by American business executive and author Michael Eisner and Tony Schwartz, published in 1999. It documents the former Walt Disney Company CEO's lengthy career at various entertainment companies, his childhood and formative years, his life's relationships, and advice he passes on to readers.
