= The Rue Mosnier Dressed with Flags =

Painting by Édouard Manet

- Artist: Édouard Manet
- Year: 1878
- Medium: oil on canvas
- Dimensions: 65.4 cm × 80 cm (25.7 in × 31 in)
- Location: J. Paul Getty Museum, Los Angeles

The Rue Mosnier with Flags is an 1878 oil on canvas painting by Édouard Manet, showing the eponymous Parisian street, decorated with French flags for the first national holiday on 30 June 1878, the Fête de la Paix (Celebration of Peace). The Fête de la Paix was held during that year's Exposition Universelle, which together marked France's recovery after the Franco-Prussian War and the Paris Commune. The holiday was moved to 14 July in 1880 to become Bastille Day. The painting is held by the J. Paul Getty Museum in Los Angeles.

The painting depicts a scene on the Rue Mosnier, now the Rue de Berne, which is overlooked by Manet's studio at 4 Rue de Saint-Pétersbourg. It was painted from an upstairs window, with tricolour flags hanging from the buildings along the road, above passing pedestrians and carriages. In the foreground is a man with a ladder, and a one-legged man on crutches, possibly a veteran wounded in the Franco-Prussian War. Behind a fence to the left is rubble from building works to extend the Gare Saint-Lazare. The painting measures 65.4 cm × 80 cm (25.7 in × 31.5 in) and it is signed and dated in the lower left corner, "Manet / 1878". This work echoes the composition of another Manet painting of 1878, Road-menders in the Rue Mosnier. Another 1878 Manet painting of a similar scene of the Rue Mosnier, decorated with flags, is held in a private collection.

Similar paintings of flags on the Rue Montorgueil and Rue Saint-Denis in Paris in 1878 were made by Claude Monet, and these works were echoed by a 1917 painting of New York by Childe Hassam, The Avenue in the Rain.

The painting passed through the hands of Jean-Baptiste Faure in the 1890s, and then Auguste Pellerin until 1910. It was owned by the Hungarians Marcell Nemes and then Baron Mór Lipót Herzog, and it was sold before 1932 to German banker Jakob Goldschmidt. After his death in 1955, it was sold by his estate in London in 1958 to Paul Mellon, and then sold at Christie's in New York in 1989 to the J. Paul Getty Museum, in California.

== Gallery ==
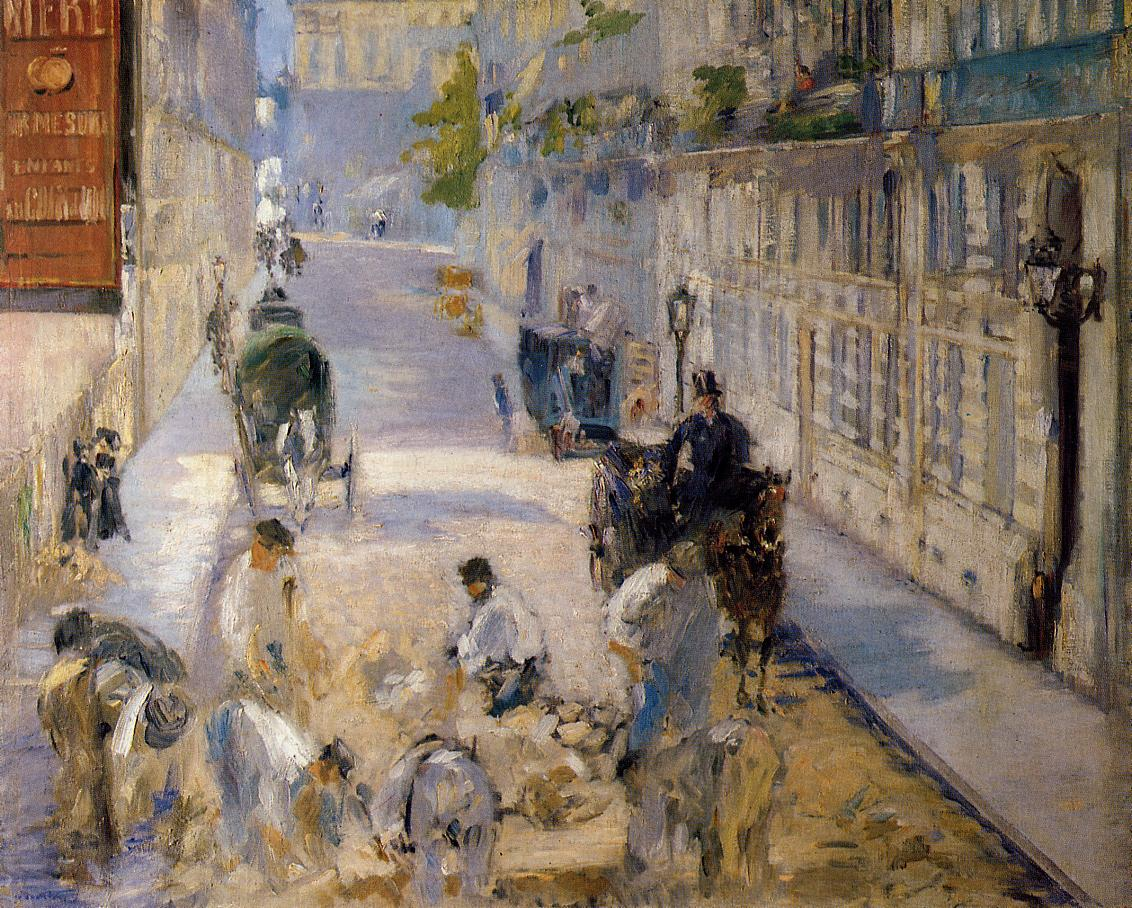
Édouard Manet, Road-menders in the Rue Mossnier, 1878, private collection

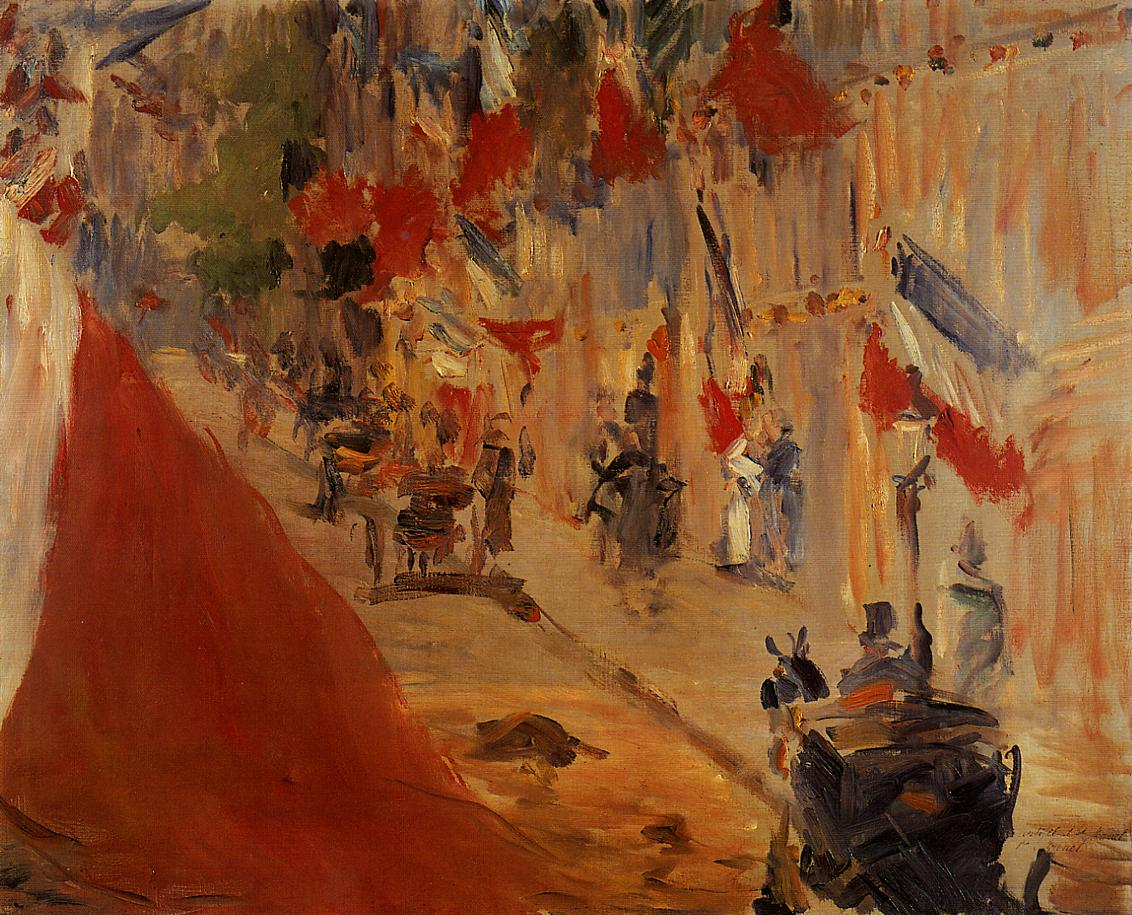
Édouard Manet, Rue Monsier with flags, 1878, private collection

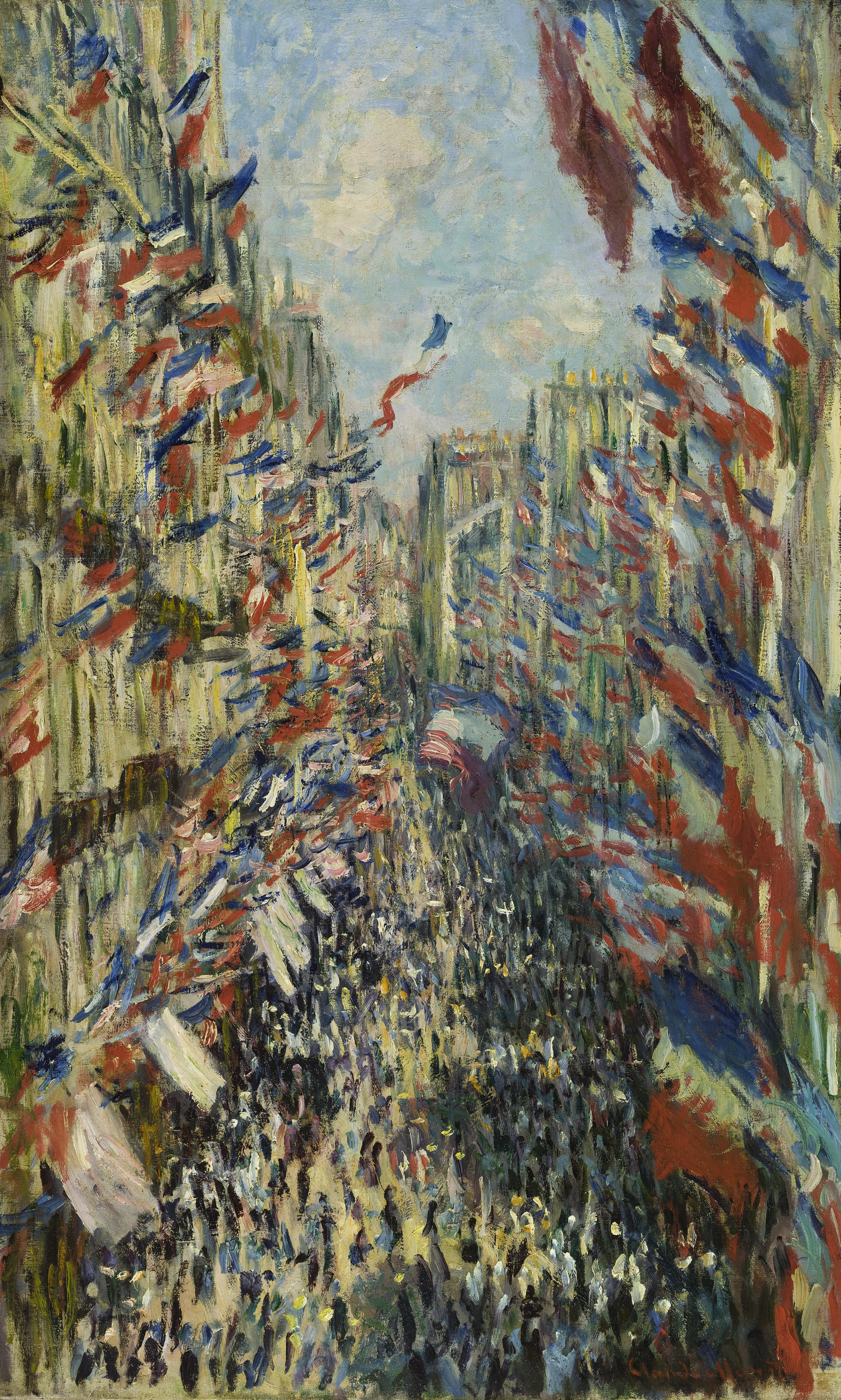
Claude Monet Rue Montorgueil à Paris. Fête du 30 juin 1878, Musée d'Orsay

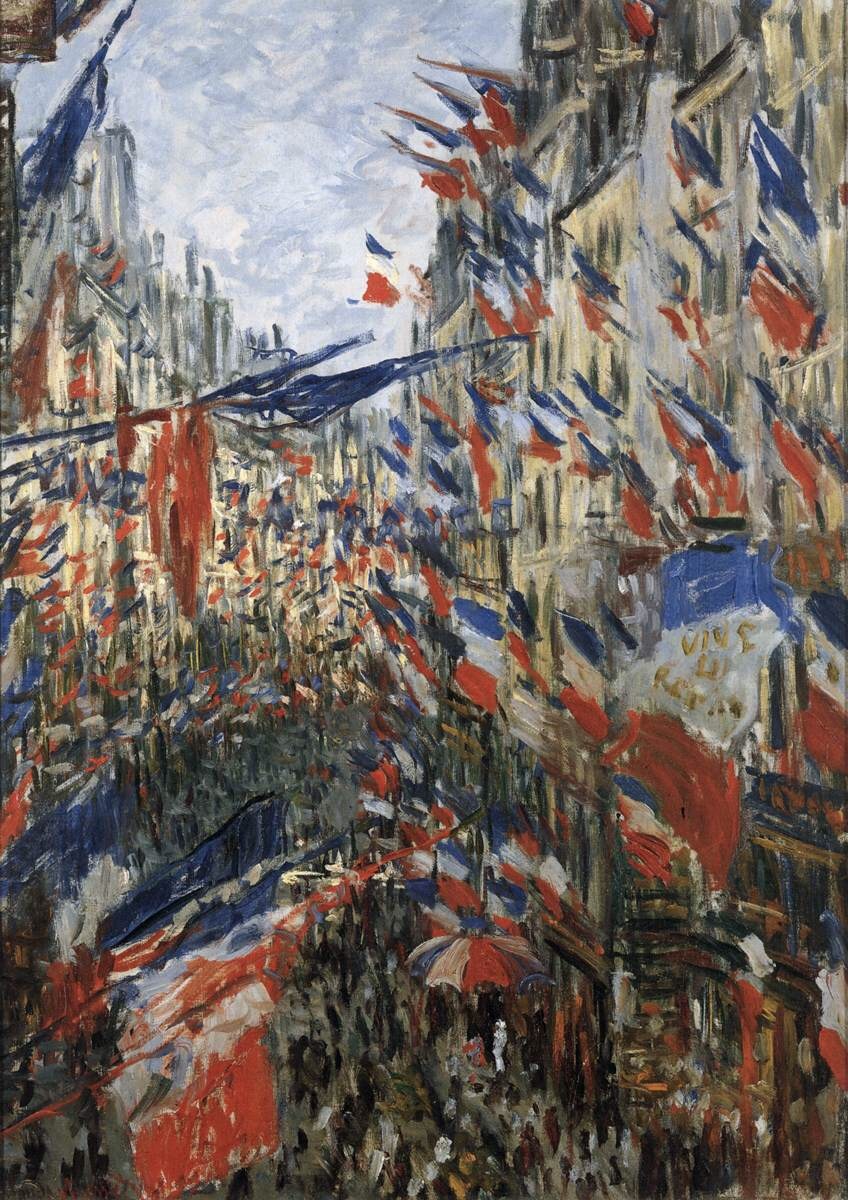
Claude Monet, Rue Saint-Denis, fête du 30 juin 1878

== See also ==
- List of paintings by Édouard Manet
- 1878 in art
