= La Négresse (Manet) =

Painting by Édouard Manet

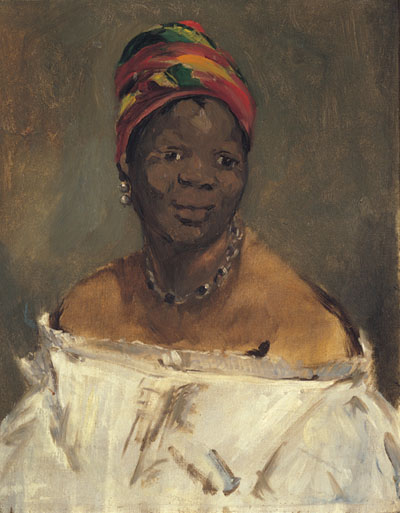
- Artist: Édouard Manet
- Year: 1862
- Medium: oil on canvas
- Dimensions: 61 cm × 50 cm (24 in × 20 in)
- Location: Pinacoteca Giovanni e Marella Agnelli, Turin

La Négresse is an 1862 oil on canvas painting by Édouard Manet, now in the Pinacoteca Giovanni e Marella Agnelli in Turin.

The name of the model for the work is Laure, the black woman holding a bunch of flowers in the same artist's Olympia. The work is still linked with the "black beauties of Baudelaire" in reference to his mistress Jeanne Duval, although Duval was mixed-race rather than black. Baudelaire and Manet became close friends, during which time he produced a portrait of Duval in 1862, entitled Baudelaire's Mistress. The poet was often in the painter's studio.

La Négresse is mentioned in Manet's posthumous inventory in 1883 under number 46 and was owned by Éva Gonzalès-Guérard, then Auguste Pellerin, then Alexandre Louis Philippe Berthier, prince of Wagram. In 1913 it belonged to Baron Herzog in Budapest, from whom it was looted by Nazi troops. The work passed through Berlin and Honolulu between 1933 and 1959, before entering its present home. It appeared in volume 1 of the 1975 Rouart-Wilderstein catalogue under the reference number RW 68.

== See also ==
- List of paintings by Édouard Manet
- 1862 in art

== Bibliography ==
- Cachin, Françoise; Moffett, Charles S.; Bareau, Juliet Wilson (1983). Manet, 1832-1883 : Galeries nationales du Grand Palais, Paris, 22 avril-1er août 1983, Metropolitan Museum of Art, New York, 10 septembre-27 novembre 1983 (in French). [Paris]: Ministère de la Culture. ISBN 2-7118-0230-2. OCLC 9663346.
- (in French) Adolphe Tabarant, Manet et ses œuvres, Paris, Gallimard, 1947, 600 p.
- (in French) Adolphe Tabarant, Les Manet de la collection Havemeyer : La Renaissance de l'art français, Paris, 1930, XIII edition
- (in French) Étienne Moreau-Nélaton, Manet raconté par lui-même, vol. 2, t. I and II, Paris, Henri Laurens, 1926.
- (in French) Collectif RMN (Stéphane Guégan, Laurence des Cars, Simone Kelly, Nancy Locke, Helen Burnham, Louis-Antoine Prat – contributors; interview with Philippe Sollers), Manet inventeur du moderne, Paris, 2011, 297 p. (ISBN 978-2-07-013323-9).
- Guégan, Stéphane; Des Cars, Laurence; Kelly, Simon R. (2011). Manet : inventeur du moderne : [exposition, Paris, Musée d'Orsay, 5 avril - 3 juillet 2011 (in French). Paris. ISBN 978-2-07-013323-9. OCLC 793112848.
