= Ted Nierenberg =

American business executive

- Born: Theodore David Nierenberg; May 20, 1923; New York
- Died: July 31, 2009 (aged 86); Armonk, New York
- Education: Carnegie Institute of Technology
- Occupations: Business executive, entrepreneur
- Known for: Founder of Dansk International Designs
- Relatives: Felice Schwartz (sister)

Theodore David Nierenberg (May 20, 1923 – July 31, 2009) was an American business executive and entrepreneur who created Dansk International Designs, a company that sells Scandinavian Design-style cooking and serving utensils and other home furnishings, established after discovering the simple but elegant design style on a 1950s trip to Denmark.

Nierenberg was born on May 20, 1923, the son of businessman Albert Nierenberg and his wife Rose. He majored in engineering management at Pittsburgh's Carnegie Institute of Technology, earning a Bachelor of Science degree in 1944. After graduation, he worked in the family business that manufactured metal nameplates for appliances.

On a trip to Europe in May 1954, Ted and his wife Martha Nierenberg visited a museum in Copenhagen, where he saw a set of unique cutlery on display that combined teak handles and stainless steel, created by artist and industrial designer Jens Harald Quistgaard. Nierenberg tracked down Quistgaard and spoke with him in an effort to convince him to manufacture the cutlery, but Quistgaard insisted that the pieces could only be forged by hand, one piece at a time. Nierenberg was able to convince Quistgaard that the pieces could be mass-produced, leading to Dansk International Design's first product, the Fjord line, which has been one of the firm's enduring bestsellers.

Dansk was established that same year by Nierenberg and his wife in the garage of their Great Neck, New York home, with Quistgaard as its founding designer. By 1956, Nierenberg was not certain that American consumers were ready for the spare styling and brought some early samples of stainless steel flatware with sinuous carved wooden handles to a Manhattan store, and was so surprised that the company bought several hundred units on the spot that he almost walked in front of a bus driving down the street. By 1958, Nierengard and Quistgaard had expanded Dansk's wares to include teak magazine racks and stools, stoneware casseroles and salt and pepper shakers, and flatware with split cane handles, with The New York Times that year as "creating a stir" as "some of the most popular accessories found in American homes".

Dansk relocated to Mount Kisco, New York, and was known for its sleek, functional products often made of exotic woods such as teak, combined with enameled metal and stainless steel. Dansk was purchased in June 1985 by Dansk Acquisition Corp. in a deal initiated by Goldman Sachs.

== Personal ==
His woodland garden and its Japanese maples, was described by The New York Times as being "widely considered among the finest gardens in the Hudson Valley". The Beckoning Path: Lessons of a Lifelong Garden, a book of Nierenberg's photographs of his gardens, was published by Aperture Press in 1993.

Nierenberg died at age 86 on July 31, 2009, due to pancreatic cancer at his home in Armonk, New York. He was survived by his wife, two daughters, two sons and ten grandchildren.
