= Felice Schwartz =

American writer, advocate and feminist

- Born: Felice Toba Nierenberg; January 16, 1925; New York
- Died: February 8, 1996 (aged 71); Manhattan, New York
- Education: Smith College
- Occupations: Writer, advocate
- Known for: Founder of Catalyst, Inc., writings on the mommy track
- Children: Tony Schwartz, Cornelia Schwartz Arnold, James Schwartz
- Relatives: Ted Nierenberg (brother)

Felice Nierenberg Schwartz (January 16, 1925 – February 8, 1996) was an American writer, advocate, and feminist. During her career, Schwartz founded two national advancement and advocacy organizations. In 1945, she established the National Scholarship Service and Fund for Negro Students (NSSFNS), an association committed to placing African Americans in institutions of higher education. In 1962, she founded Catalyst, a national organization dedicated to advancing women in the workplace, where she served as president for three decades.

Schwartz is also well known for her controversial article, "Management Women and the New Facts of Life", published in Harvard Business Review in 1989. The article pitted her against other feminists, such as Betty Friedan, for pointing out the differences between men and women and their functions in the workplace.

She was inducted into the National Women's Hall of Fame in 1998.

== Background ==
Schwartz was born Felice Toba Nierenberg on January 16, 1925, in New York, to Jewish parents – businessman Albert Nierenberg, and his wife, Rose Irene (née Levin). After attending boarding school in Cooperstown, New York, she enrolled in Smith College, where she graduated in 1945. In 1946, she married Irving Schwartz, a physician, with whom she raised three children. After her father's death in 1951, she took over the ailing family manufacturing business with her brother, which they successfully saved and sold four years later.

== Career ==
After graduation from Smith in 1945, Schwartz sought to address the extremely low number of African American students at the college. Because she had been one of only a few Jewish students at her high school, Schwartz empathized with the isolation of African Americans at Smith. That same year she founded the National Scholarship Service and Fund for Negro Students. The organization petitioned colleges and universities to open their doors to African American applicants, and matched qualified students with available scholarship money. In 1951, Schwartz left the organization to help manage the family business. However, she soon encountered the unpleasant realities of running a company as a woman, and she left to become a full-time mother after the birth of her second child. She had a third child and ultimately was out of the workforce for nine years. During this time, she became frustrated by the obstacles preventing educated mothers such as herself from entering or re-entering the workforce.

In 1962, Schwartz contacted the presidents of several colleges, and a handful of them became the board of directors of Catalyst, Inc., a new organization that she hoped would address the issues she and others had experienced as businesswomen and mothers. At the time, Catalyst's mission was "to bring to our country's needs the unused capacities of educated women who want to combine family and work." Schwartz went on to lead Catalyst as its president for 30 years until her retirement in 1993.

Over her career, Schwartz was a prolific writer. The piece that she is probably best known for, entitled "Management Women and the New Facts of Life", was published in the Harvard Business Review in 1989. The article was interpreted as suggesting that companies create two career paths to accommodate women who wish to balance career and family and women whose careers are their primary concern. It sparked a heated debate after The New York Times ridiculed Schwartz's idea, dubbing it the "mommy track". Schwartz, however, maintained that her article was misinterpreted, saying, "I violated the politically correct thing by saying that women are not just like men. What I said then and still say is that women face many, many obstacles in the workplace that men do not face. I was saying to that group of men at the top, 'Rather than let women's talents go to waste, do something about it'."

Schwartz died on February 8, 1996, in Manhattan.
