= Mommy track =

A mommy track is a path in a woman's life that puts priority to being a mother. It can also specifically refer to work arrangements for women in the workforce that facilitate motherhood, such as flexible hours, but at the same time usually provides fewer opportunities for career advancement. References to the mommy track often go along with being a housewife, "opting out" of the workforce, temporarily or even permanently. Women following the mommy track may be contrasted to career women who prioritize their careers more than having children.

== Origins of the term ==
Writer Jennifer A. Kingson introduced the term "mommy track" in an August 8, 1988, article in The New York Times, in which she described the career hurdles faced by law firm associates who sacrificed advancement potential once they had children.

Felice Schwartz's 1989 article in the Harvard Business Journal is sometimes called the first discussion of the mommy track phenomenon. Schwartz claims in the article that while "the cost of employing women in management is greater than the cost of employing men," this greater cost is due primarily to gendered expectations of the workplace and women's duties in raising children. Schwartz wrote:

The misleading metaphor of the glass ceiling suggests an invisible barrier constructed by corporate leaders to impede the upward mobility of women beyond the middle levels. A more appropriate metaphor, I believe, is the kind of cross-sectional diagram used in geology. The barriers to women’s leadership occur when potentially counterproductive layers of influence on women—maternity, tradition, socialization—meet management strata pervaded by the largely unconscious preconceptions, stereotypes, and expectations of men. Such interfaces do not exist for men and tend to be impermeable for women.

Schwartz's assertions generated widespread publicity and a new conversation about women in the workplace. The New York Times, having coined the term in 1988, described mommy track in greater detail in a March 8, 1989 article, "Mommy Career Track Sets Off Furor" which discussed Schwartz's article and the response to it in the public sphere. The article described the mommy track as a phenomenon "in which women with family responsibilities are shunted into dead-end, lower-paying jobs."

== Wage gap for mothers ==
Across different pay levels and socioeconomic groups, women's earnings tend to plateau after giving birth. Even when controlling for variables, on average mothers in all groups earn lower wages than non-mothers. Beyond this general drop in earnings, though, there are significant differences in mothers’ wage gaps between high-earning women and low-earning women.

=== High-earning women ===
High-earning women appear to bear much higher costs of childbirth than low-earning women. In the US, choosing to have children will force a woman to give up 21 to 33 percent of her lifetime earnings, a loss that could cost up to hundreds of thousands of dollars. Ten years after having children, a highly skilled woman with children remains at a pay level 24% lower than non-mothers even when time out of the workforce is taken into account. This group of women also seems to face greater discrimination within the workplace; only 16% of all law firm partners are women, a discrepancy absent from lower-skilled professions. Higher-skilled women tend to have flatter wage-earning trajectories than their low-skilled counterparts after giving birth, primarily seen in a lack of wage growth.

=== Low-earning women ===
Low-earning women who have children are sacrificing about 10 to 14 percent of their total lifetime earnings. Even ten years after having children, a mother in the US in this income bracket earns wages that are about 12% lower than non-mother, low-skilled women. This group of mothers tends to experience a one-time fall in pay immediately after childbirth of about 6%, but after that initial fall the wage gap between women with children and those without does not continue to grow over time.

== Part-time work and flexibility ==
A theory frequently cited for why mothers earning lower wages than other women that is the fact that mothers tend to spend fewer hours in the workplace than non-mothers. A report in 2014 by the Bureau of Labor Statistics stated that employed men worked 52 minutes more than employed women on the days they worked, and that this difference partly reflects women's greater likelihood of working part-time. Part-time work and flextime or more flexible arrangements are seen as hallmarks of the mommy track, since they point to women not being in the workplace full-time. However, this is changing as more people—men and women alike—choose more flexible work arrangements that allow for more free time.

== Cultural pressures and influences ==
In the years since the women's liberation movement and second-wave feminism, gender roles have become more complicated and less dogmatic. Despite this, the modern ideal of "intensive parenting", first described by Sharon Hays, ensures that mothers continue to take primary responsibility for raising children due to the engrained social norm that women are better nurturers. This is one of the reasons that while both men and women report having increased trouble with their work-life balance after having a baby, women are the only ones whose hours working decrease as a response to this conflict. Moreover, women who cannot afford to pay someone else to take care of domestic work are faced with the double burden of working outside of the home while continuing to complete the majority of domestic work in the home.

Another cultural influence on mothers' decreased presence in the workforce is gender discrimination within the U.S. tax code. Since domestic labor in one's own home is unpaid and untaxed, and women continue to do a majority of domestic labor as a result of societal norms, in many households it may be less expensive for a woman to take care of this labor than to go to work and pay someone else to cook, clean, and care for children. The tax code also sees men as the primary earners and women as secondary earners, so men benefit from joint filing while women's earnings are frequently subject to higher taxation. Married women in the workforce also pay payroll taxes, reducing their earnings, although they frequently receive the same benefits (Social Security and Medicare) as spouses even if they do not join the workforce.

== Criticism ==
Many feminists saw the idea of the mommy track as divisive to women and therefore one that could have a detrimental effect to the feminist cause. Since Schwartz's initial article proposed sorting women into two categories based on their devotion to careers, some saw this as a division between women that both forced them into narrow categories and ignored any existing differences between men.

There is also an ongoing discussion of whether the wage gap that results from a mommy track is any sort of societal discrimination against women, or basically an effect of mothers choosing to spend more time away from work.

== In different countries ==
=== United States ===
In a 2005 study, in the US, it has been estimated that 31% of working mothers left the workplace (for an average of 2.2 years), most often precipitated by the birth of the second child. As of 2015, the US was one of only three countries in the world (the other two being Papua New Guinea and Suriname) that does not have laws that require employers to provide paid maternity leave.

=== Japan ===
Japan's social norms, like those of the U.S., help to cause many women to move into part-time work upon having children. However, unlike the U.S., Japanese mothers rarely return to full-time work after having children. Even more so than other developed countries, Japan has an especially high proportion of women who work part-time, and a majority of those women are mothers. Common business practices in Japan further penalize mothers who may have taken leave from the workplace at some point, due to companies choosing to only recruit directly from universities and setting upper limits on age for full-time positions.

=== Netherlands ===
In the Netherlands women have entered the workforce relatively recently. Throughout much of the 20th century, women faced many legal and social obstacles preventing them from working. Although in the late 1950s, the Netherlands made important legal changes, such as removing the marriage bar and the marital power of the husband, it was only in 1984 that full legal equality between husband and wife was achieved – prior to 1984 the law stipulated that the husband's opinion prevailed over the wife's regarding issues such as decisions on children's education and the domicile of the family, reflecting the traditional structure of the society. Also, according to The Economist, "[Dutch] politics was dominated by Christian values until the 1980s", which meant that Dutch women were slower to enter into the workforce. In the early 1980s, the Commission of the European Communities report Women in the European Community found that "it is in the Netherlands (17.6%) and in Ireland (13.6%) that we see the smallest numbers of married women working and the least acceptance of this phenomenon by the general public". (pg 14). From the 1980s onwards, the numbers of women entering the workplace have increased, but most of the women work part time. In 2012, 76.9% of employed women worked part-time, well above the European Union average of 32.1%.

=== The United Kingdom ===
The UK has less working mothers than many other Western countries. Lack of sufficient childcare and social stigma against working mothers have been cited as reasons. In general, women in the UK have one of the highest rate of part-time work in Europe. A report by OECD which looked at the OECD members, as well as at other countries from inside and outside Europe, found that only the Netherlands and Switzerland had a higher percentage of women working part-time. Women in the UK face one of the worst motherhood penalties among Western countries: "[mothers] find significant motherhood wage penalties in several Continental Northern European countries (Austria, the Netherlands and Germany) and Anglophone countries (Canada, the UK and the US)". The European Council, in a recommendation to the UK (which is non-binding), has criticized the UK because "The difference in the share of part-time work between women (42.6% in 2013) and men (13.2% in 2013) is one of the highest in the Union. The percentage of women who are inactive or work part-time due to personal and family responsibilities (12.5%) was almost twice as high as the EU average (6.3%) in 2013...[e]ven if supply in the childcare system has increased recently, the availability of affordable, high-quality, full-time childcare remains a key issue."

=== Nordic countries ===
In the Nordic countries, marriage and having children have far greater effects on women than on men, partly due to the expectation that women will continue unpaid domestic labor. However, the Nordic countries have worked to make the dual-earner household the norm, with nationalized childcare, parental leave, and flexible working hours making it possible for women to continue to work. According to a 2007 UNICEF report, in Sweden, although parents are given 12 months of parental leave time that can be divided between the two as each couple sees best, gender norms continue to have an effect: mandated maternity leave combined with Sweden allowing women to reduce work hours after giving birth means that nearly half of mothers in dual-income families work less than full-time. Although women in Nordic countries have a high overall labour participation, there is a strong segregation by gender with women being often found in certain work sectors, which have a working culture adapted to family life, with flexible hours and offers of part-time jobs, and men working in other sectors. According to the Nordic Information on Gender "The gender-segregated labour market is a main reason why women are more likely to work part time in the Nordic countries than elsewhere in Europe". However, this part-time work culture does not extend to Finland, where for historical reasons there was a shortage of labour in the country, which increased the need for women to work full time – as such, the part-time culture of the other Nordic countries was never established in Finland. Finland has a longer tradition of mothers working, compared to the other Nordic countries: in 1978, 73% of Finnish mothers of 0–6 year olds were employed, compared to 69% of Swedish and only 48% of Norwegian. As of 2014, Sweden's employment rate for women was the highest in the EU28, and was only slightly below that of men (73% female rate vs. 76.5% male rate). This compared with the EU28 rate of 58.8% female vs 69% male.

== See also ==
- Age and female fertility
- Female labor force in the Muslim world

Policies:

- Paid family leave
- Parental leave

General:

- Maternal wall
- Time bind
- Work-life balance
