= Poul Volther =

Danish furniture designer (1923–2001)

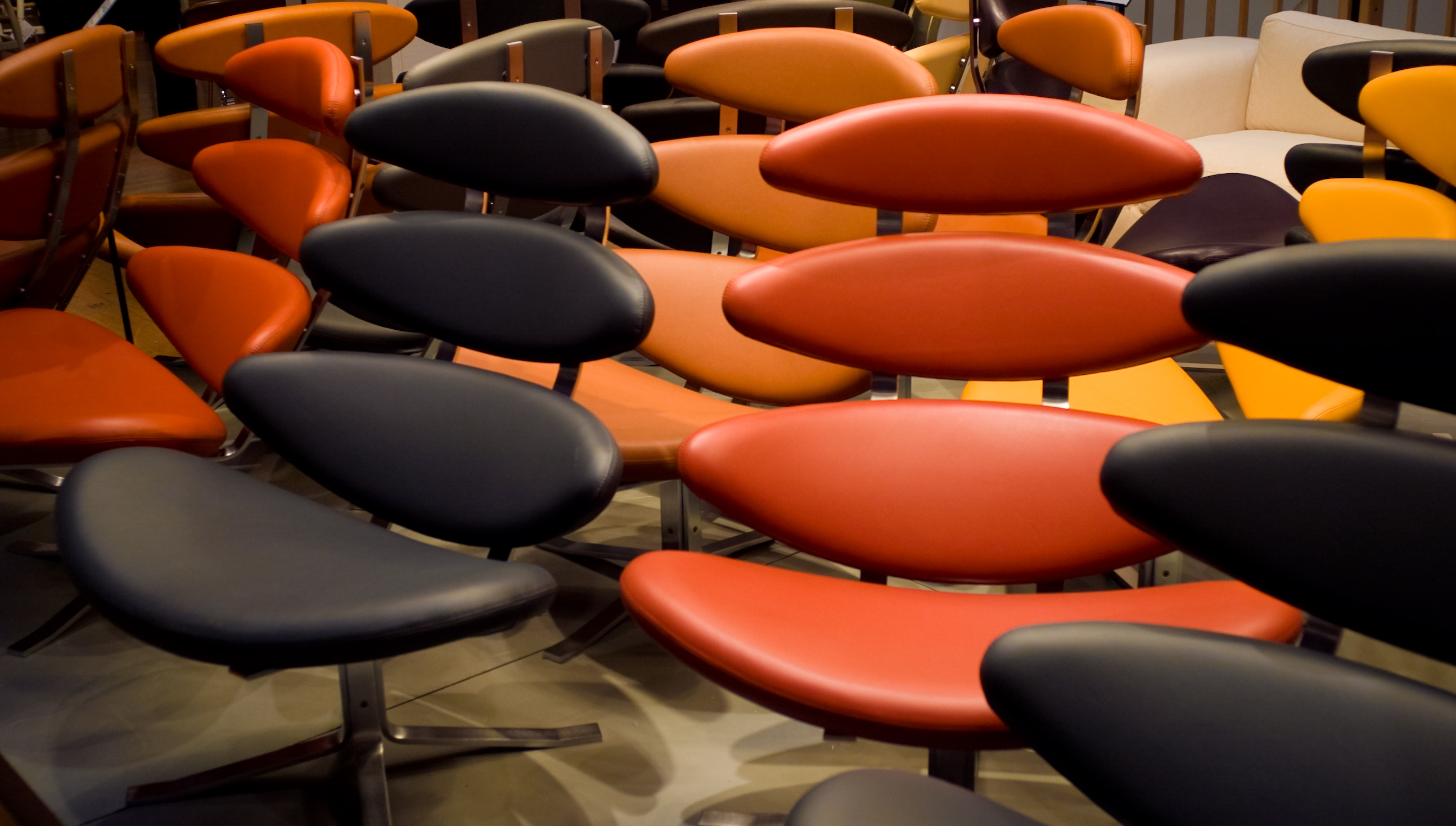
Poul Volther: Corona Chairs

Poul M. Volther (2 January 1923 – 23 January 2001) was a Danish furniture designer who is remembered above all for his iconic Corona Chair. He succeeded Børge Mogensen as artistic director of FDB Møbler in 1950.

== Early life ==
First trained as a cabinetmaker, Volther studied furniture design at the Arts and Crafts School in Copenhagen. A believer in Functionalism, he avoided short-lived aesthetic trends, concentrating on the simple crafting of quality materials. As a teacher at Denmark's Design School, he encouraged hundreds of students to aim for high quality craftsmanship. With the support of designer Hans Wegner, he was employed from 1949 by the cooperative FDB Møbler, working in their design studio under the leadship of Børge Mogensen. Mogensen left FDB in 1950, leaving Volther in charge from 1950-55. He went on to design a series of Windsor chairs, rather simpler in style than Mogensen's own. He also designed a wide variety of armchairs and sofas which can still be seen in homes throughout Denmark and are still in production.

== Developing the Corona Chair ==
His early chair designs were based on a series of cushions separated by open spaces in order to economize on materials which were difficult to obtain after the Second World War. The first model, the Pyramid Chair from 1953, with foam and cloth elements, was far from successful. But the same basic approach eventually led to his masterpiece, the Corona Chair, first designed in 1961. The original consisted of a wooden skeleton on which a series of oval cushions provided the seat and the rising back. The idea was that it would allow the body to relax in various positions. The following year, as the result of cooperation between Volther and the recently established Erik Jørgensen furniture factory, a new model with a chrome-plated steel frame was marketed in 1964. But it was still far from successful.

Some 20 years later, yet another variant was presented at the furniture fair in Cologne, receiving a good press but not selling too well. Nevertheless, Erik Jørgensen's firm persisted. In 1997, the chair was presented both at the Cologne fair and at the Scandinavian Furniture Fair at the Bella Center in Copenhagen. This time it was a resounding success. The Corona was used at the 2002 EU Summit in Copenhagen, the year after Volther died. Today, with its elliptical, blow-up cushions, it has reached iconic status, becoming Jørgensen's most successful item, with sales of almost 3,000 a year.

== See also ==
- Danish modern
- Danish design
