= Danish design =

Functionalist style from the mid-20th century

Arne Jacobsen's clock in the Glostrup Town Hall, Glostrup, Denmark

Danish design is a style of functionalistic design and architecture that was developed in mid-20th century. Influenced by the German Bauhaus school, many Danish designers used the new industrial technologies, combined with ideas of simplicity and functionalism to design buildings, furniture and household objects, many of which have become iconic and are still in use and production. Prominent examples are the Egg chair, the PH lamps and the Sydney Opera House (Australia).

== History ==
The Danish Culture Canon credits Thorvald Bindesbøll (1846–1908) with early contributions to design in the areas of ceramics, jewellery, bookbinding, silver and furniture although he is known in the rest of the world for creating the Carlsberg logo (1904), still in use today. The Canon also includes Knud V. Engelhardt (1882–1931) for a more industrial approach, especially in the rounded contours of his electric tramcar designs which were widely copied. In the area of textiles, Marie Gudme Leth (1895–1997) brought the screen printing process to Denmark, opening a factory in 1935 which allowed her colourful patterns to be manufactured on an industrial basis. August Sandgren introduced functionalism in the design of his masterful bookbindings.

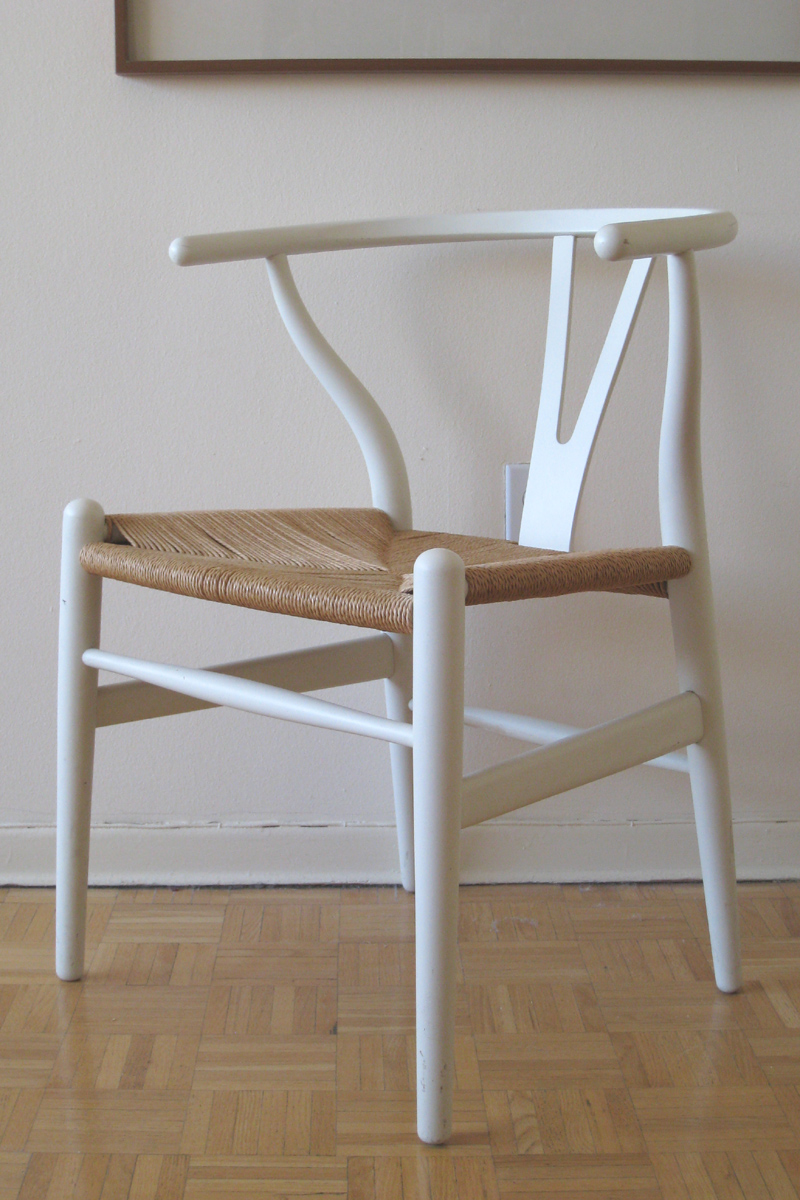
The forms and materials of Hans Wegner's Wishbone Chair are representative of the movement's aesthetic

In the late 1940s, shortly after the end of the Second World War, conditions in Denmark were ideally suited to success in design. The emphasis was on furniture but architecture, silver, ceramics, glass and textiles also benefitted from the trend. Denmark's late industrialisation combined with a tradition of high-quality craftsmanship formed the basis of gradual progress towards industrial production. After the end of the war, Europeans were keen to find novel approaches such as the light wood furniture from Denmark. Last but not least, support in Denmark for freedom of individual expression assisted the cause.

The newly established Furniture School at the Royal Danish Academy of Art played a considerable part in the development of furniture design. Kaare Klint taught functionalism based on the size and proportions of objects, wielding considerable influence. Hans J. Wegner, who had been trained as a cabinetmaker, contributed with a unique sense of form, especially in designing chairs.

As head of FDB Møbler, Børge Mogensen designed simple and robust objects of furniture for the average Danish family. Finn Juhl demonstrated an individualistic approach in designing chairs with an appealing but functional look.

In the early 1950s, American design also influenced Danish furniture. The American Charles Eames designed and manufactured chairs of moulded wood and steel pipes. These encouraged Arne Jacobsen to design his Ant Chair, Denmark's first industrially manufactured chair. Furthermore, as Shaker furniture—and especially its reputation for stripped down chairs—began to be more and more known abroad, it also influenced Danish designers.

Poul Kjærholm, Verner Panton and Nanna Ditzel followed a few years later, continuing the successful story of Danish design. Kjærholm worked mainly in steel and leather, Panton left Denmark during the 1960s to continue designing imaginative but highly unconventional plastic chairs while Nanna Ditzel, who also had a strongly individualistic approach, was successful in helping to renew Danish furniture design in the 1980s.

== Modern trends ==
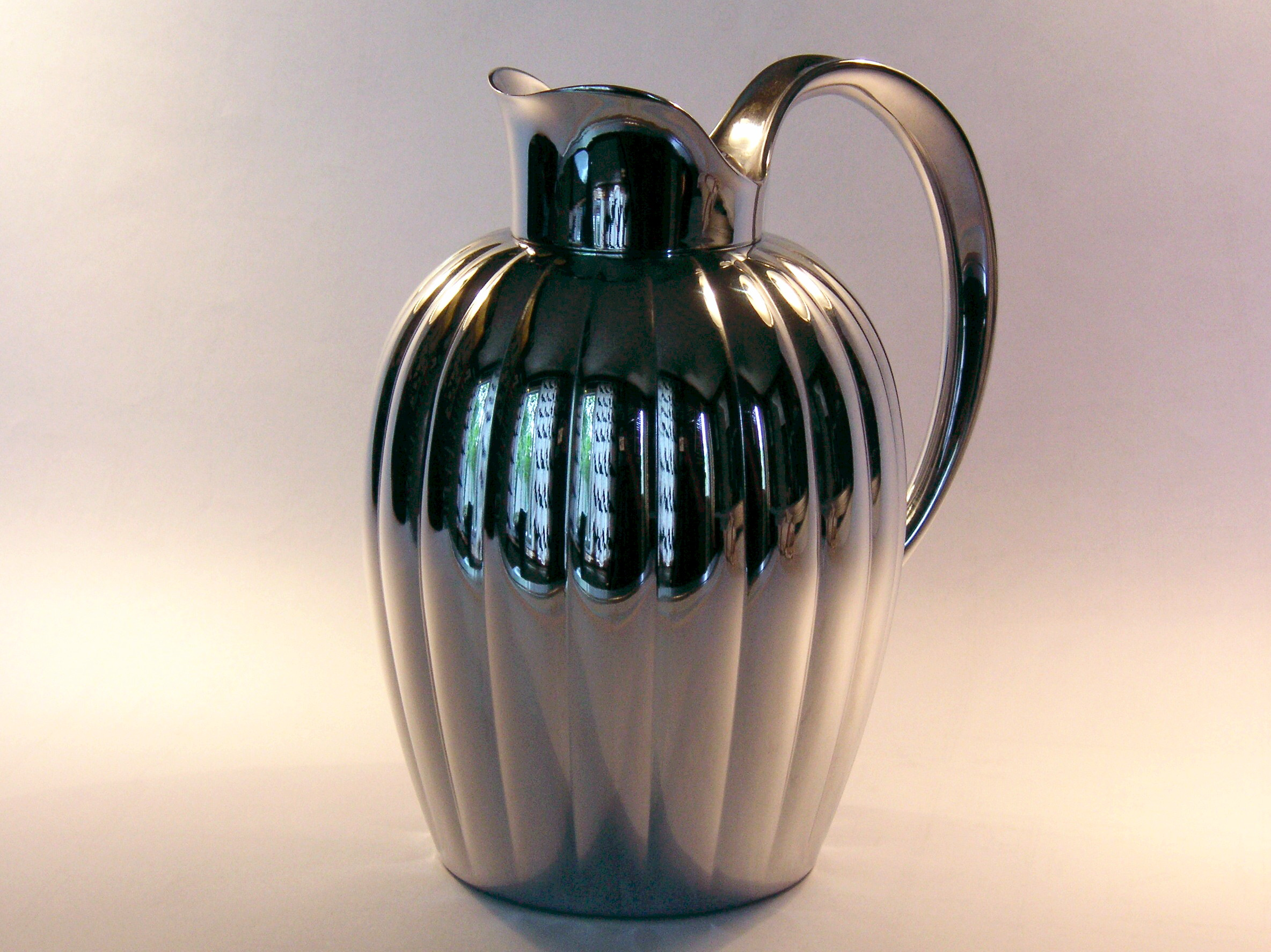
Bernadotte's thermos jug, 2004

During the 1970s, Verner Panton made some of his most important designs, including the Pantonova and the 1-2-3 System.

Danish furniture design during the 1980s did not include prominent contributions. By contrast, industrial designers began to prosper, making use of principles such as focus on the user, as well as attention to materials and to detail. For example, there are well known Danish designers, like Tobias Jacobsen (the grandson of Arne Jacobsen), who focused on the single elements of a violin when creating his chair "Vio" or on a boomerang when designing his eponymous sideboard.

The Bernadotte & Bjørn studio, established in 1950, was the first to specialise in industrial design, with an emphasis on office machines, domestic appliances and functional articles such as the thermos jug. The electronics manufacturer Bang & Olufsen, in collaboration with Bernadotte & Bjørn and later with Jacob Jensen and David Lewis, went on to excel in modern design work. Around the same time, the Stelton company collaborated with Arne Jacobsen and Erik Magnussen to produce their iconic vacuum jug, a huge international success.

Another successful design field is medical technology. Danish design companies like 3PART, Designit and CBD have worked in this area with individual designers such as Steve McGugan and Anders Smith.

In 2002 the Danish Government and the City of Copenhagen launched an effort to establish a world event for design in Copenhagen. Originally understood as a tool for branding traditional Danish design, the non-profit organization INDEX: shifted focus after worldwide research and coined the concept of Design to Improve Life, which rapidly became celebrated in Denmark and around the world. The organization now hands out the biggest design award in the world biannual in Copenhagen, tours large scale outdoor exhibition around the world, run educational program as well as design labs and hosts a global network.

Today, there is strong focus on design in Denmark as industry increasingly appreciates the importance of design in the business environment. In addition, as part of its trade and industry policy, the Danish government has launched the DesignDenmark initiative which aims to restore Denmark to the international design elite.

== Architecture ==
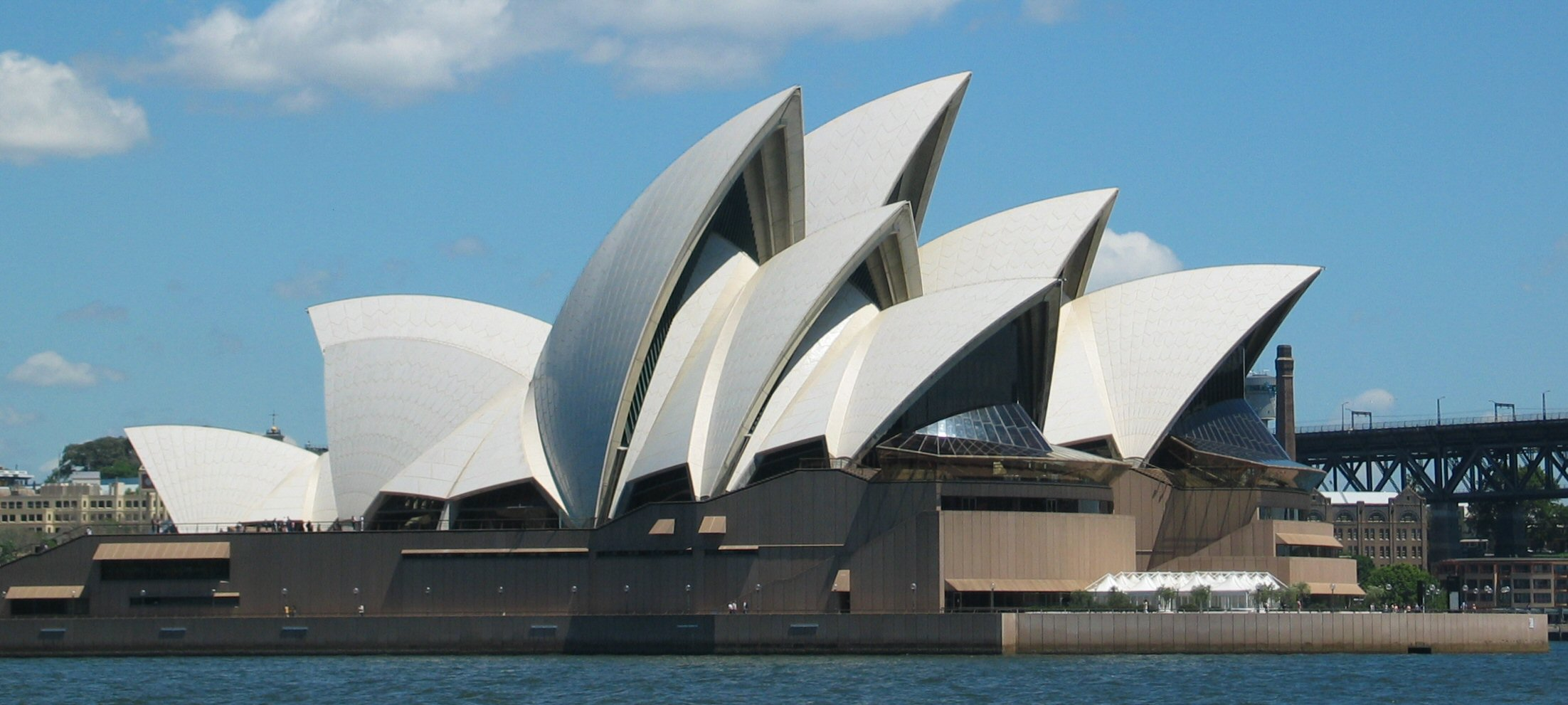
Utzon's Sydney Opera House, 1973

Modern architecture has also contributed to the concept of Danish design.

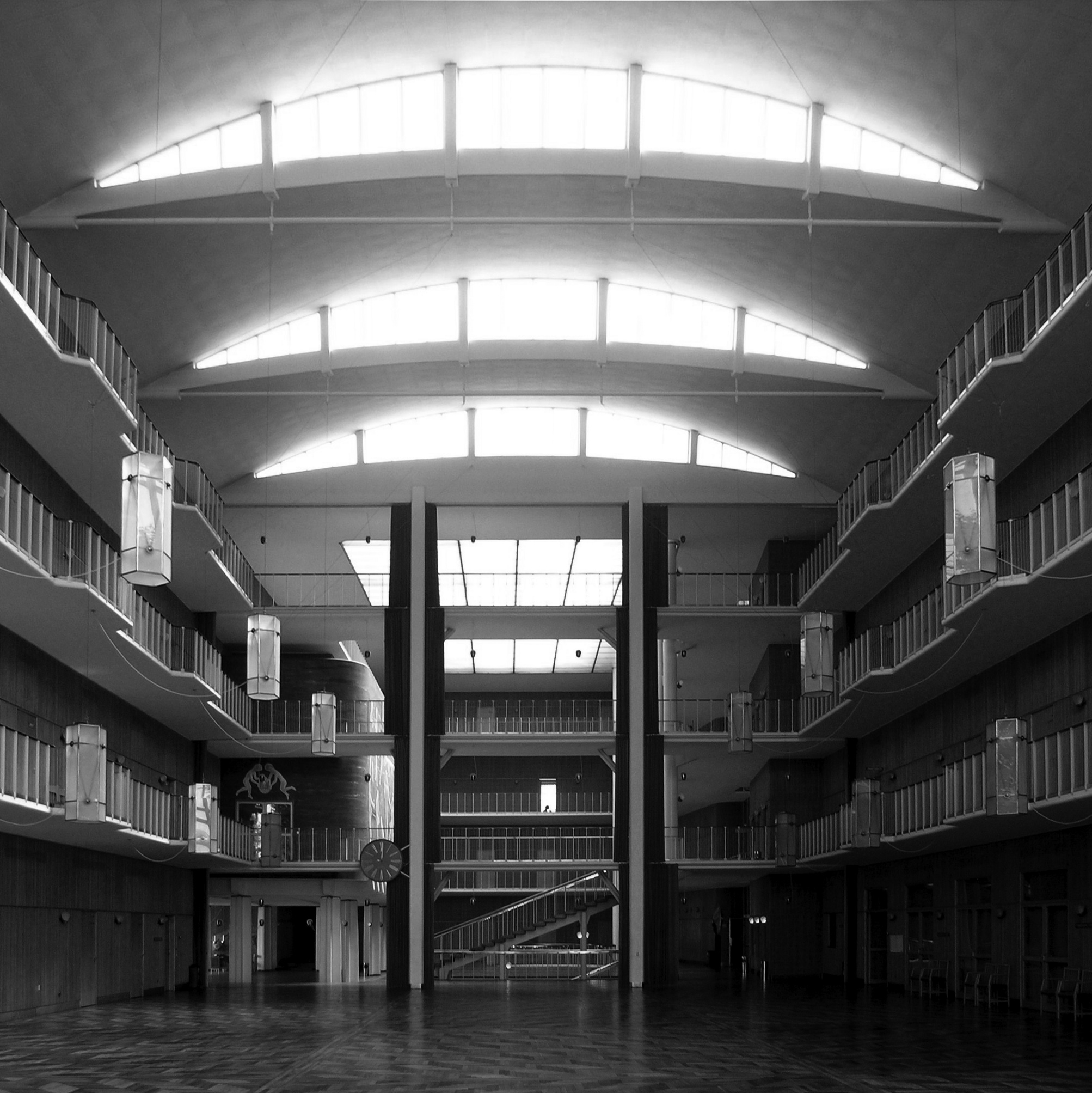
Århus City Hall, Århus, Denmark

Arne Jacobsen was not just a furniture designer but one of the leading architects of his times. Among his achievements are the Bellevue Theater and restaurant, Klampenborg (1936), the Århus City Hall (with Erik Møller; 1939–42) and the SAS Royal Hotel (1958–60).

Jørn Utzon (1918–2008), Denmark's most widely recognized architect, is remembered for his expressionist Sydney Opera House (1966) and the later Bagsværd Church (1976) with its wavy concrete roof.

Henning Larsen (b. 1925) is the architect who designed the boldly modern Copenhagen Opera House on the island of Holmen which was completed in 2005.

Danish architecture is currently in a new-wave era, not receiving more attention since the golden age of Arne Jacobsen and Jørn Utzon, being focused on function and concept rather than aesthetics and an impeccable finish. Bjarke Ingels of Bjarke Ingels Group (BIG) and Dan Stubbergaard's architectural firm Cobe who met at the former drawing office Plot, are both part of the new wave. Mentionable projects are BIG's Amager Bakke (Copenhill) and Cobe's Nørreport Station.

== Recent achievements ==
Today, the concept of Danish design is thriving in an ever-wider number of fields. Among recent highlights are:

- The Museum of Modern Art in New York has chosen to outfit 95% of its new Yoshio Taniguchi-designed home with furniture by Danish design company GUBI.
- The Danish Zenvo ST1 supercar.
- The Evita Peroni suite of women's accessories which now has some 300 stores in 30 countries.
- The Halifax Central Library in Halifax, Nova Scotia, Canada, was designed by the Danish architectural firm Schmidt Hammer Lassen. After it was completed in 2014, it has received widespread acclaim and several architecture awards.

== Designers ==
Among the most successful designers associated with the concept are Børge Mogensen (1914–72), Finn Juhl (1912–89), Hans Wegner (1914–2007), Arne Jacobsen (1902–71), Poul Kjærholm (1929–80), Poul Henningsen (1894–1967) and Verner Panton (1926–98).

Other designers of note include Kristian Solmer Vedel (1923–2003) in the area of industrial design, Jens Harald Quistgaard (1919–2008) for kitchen furniture and implements, Gertrud Vasegaard (1913–2007) for ceramics, and Ole Wanscher (1903–85), who had a classical approach to furniture design.

== Museums ==
- The Danish Museum of Art & Design (or, Designmuseum Denmark) in Copenhagen exhibits many of the artifacts associated with Danish design, especially furniture.
- The New York Museum of Modern Art also has a large Danish design collection.
- The Danish Design Centre in the centre of Copenhagen has both permanent and special exhibitions promoting Danish design.

== See also ==
- BoConcept
- Carl Hansen & Søn
- Danish Culture Canon
- Anders Nørgaard
- FDB Møbler
- Scandinavian design
