= FDB Møbler =

Danish furniture company

FDB Møbler A/S
- Company type: Aktieselskab
- Industry: Furniture
- Founded: 1942
- Headquarters: Albertslund, Denmark
- Key people: Ole Kiel (CEO)
- Products: Danish Modern Furniture and home goods
- Parent: Coop amba (former)
- Website: www.fdbmobler.dk

FDB Møbler is a Danish furniture company established in 1942. It was formerly a subsidiary of FDB (now called Coop amba). Børge Mogensen served as the design studio manager and many of his designs are sold by the company. Mogensen was succeeded Poul M. Volther (1950–55), Ejvind A. Johansson (1956–58), and Jørgen Bækmark (1958–67).

FDB closed its furniture subsidiary business in 1980, but revived it in 2013.

== Original company ==
FDB Møbler aimed to offer its products at competitive prices through vertical integration of hiring its own designers and managing the manufacturing and retail sales. The company purchased Tarm Stole- og Møbelfabrik to gain full control of the manufacturing supply chain.

While the company promoted its affordability with the "Furniture for Everyone" motto, Christian Holmsted Olesen of Designmuseum Denmark argues that FDB Møbler failed to achieve its goal of creating affordable furniture for all. Børge Mogensen and the designers he employed came from the Copenhagen Cabinetmaker's Guild tradition and were unwilling to prioritize affordability over craftsmanship and quality. As a result, the products were financially attainable to the upper middle but not the working class. The furniture style were also not designed for the tastes of the masses. Instead of designing furniture in the Historicist period that many working class preferred and associated with historical notions of wealth, FDB Møbler designed in the Danish modern and Shaker style with limited appeal to that population.

In 1945, the furniture company released And a Bright and Happy Future, a 25-minute propaganda film directed by Peter Lind which told the story of a young couple replacing their old nineteenth-century furniture new modern furniture offered by FDB Møbler. In 2014, a book of the company's history was published under the same name of the film, A bright and happy future - the story of FDB Møbler.

Like the larger Danish furniture industry, FDB Møbler started struggled in the late 1960s as consumers preferences and purchasing habits changed. FDB closed its design studio in 1967, but continued production until 1980, when it sold its furniture factory in Tarm and sold off its designs.

== Relaunch in 2013 ==
With the resurgence of interest in Danish Modern furniture, HAY and Fredericia Furniture relaunched former FDB furniture designs. Coop, seeing renewed interest in the brand, relaunched the company in 2013. They worked with Kvist Møbler, who purchased the Tarm factory in 1980, to recreate the furniture line. While the original furniture production was based in Denmark, the furniture production is now located in Latvia.

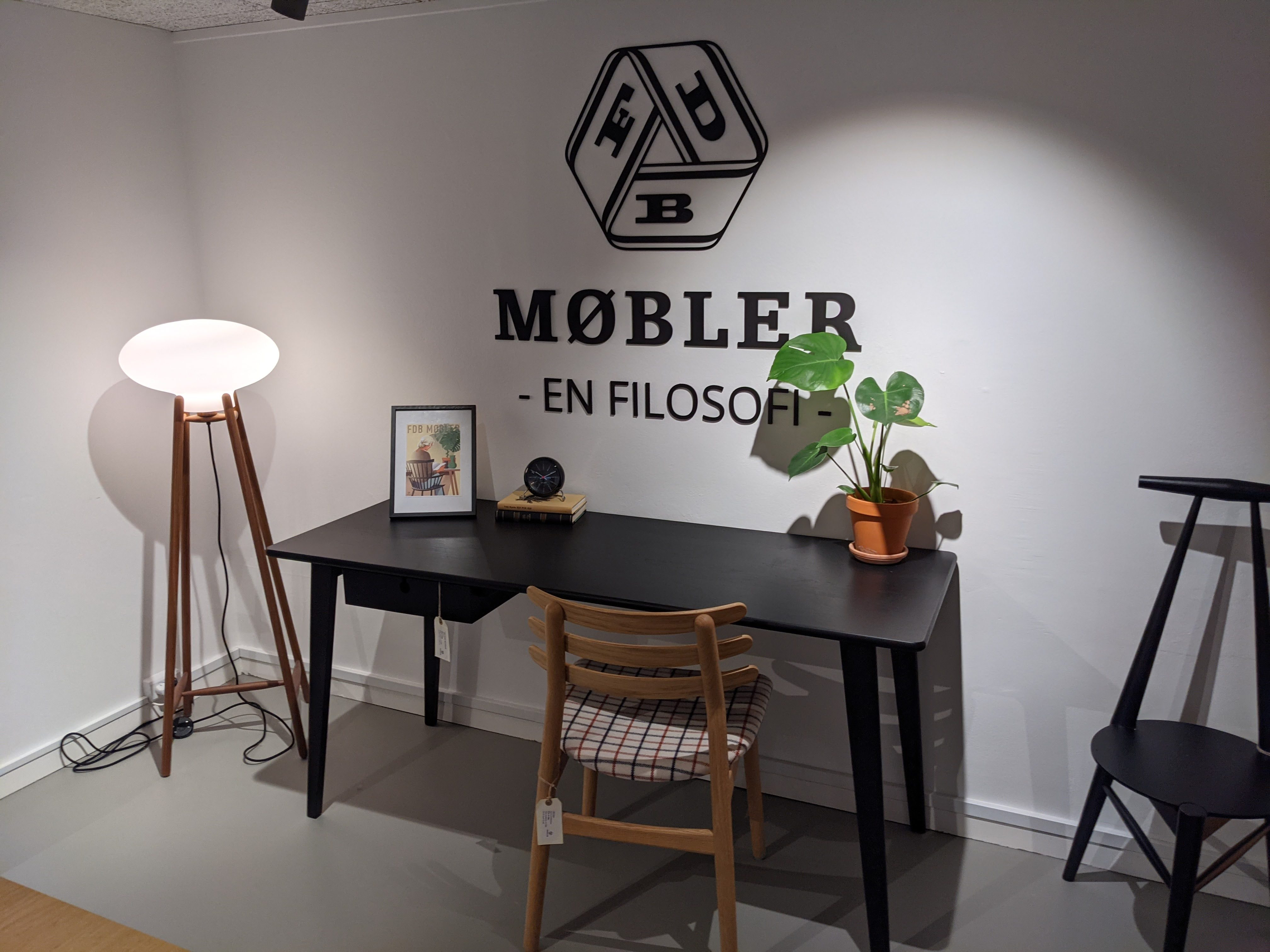
FDB Møbler store in Copenhagen

Their inventory sold out after just 10 days of relaunching. In 2019, the company became an independent limited company in order to compete in foreign markets more aggressively. In September 2020, the Denmark-based investment firm Brugsforeningernes Låneforening purchased around 50% of the company, corresponding to its share of Coop Danmark.

While the company was originally marketed its affordability its first incarnation, the furniture is now aimed at design conscious consumers and cost considerably more. The J52B chair sells for DKK 3299 (~US$526) which is considerably more than IKEA's prices or other affordable options. FDB Møbler is now focused marketing on sustainability over affordability. All wood products are FSC certified and all textiles have Oeko-Tex labeling. FDB Møbler announced that all furniture they produce will have the Nordic swan environmental certification by 2025.

The company has 9 independently-run retail furniture stores throughout Denmark, including two in Copenhagen.

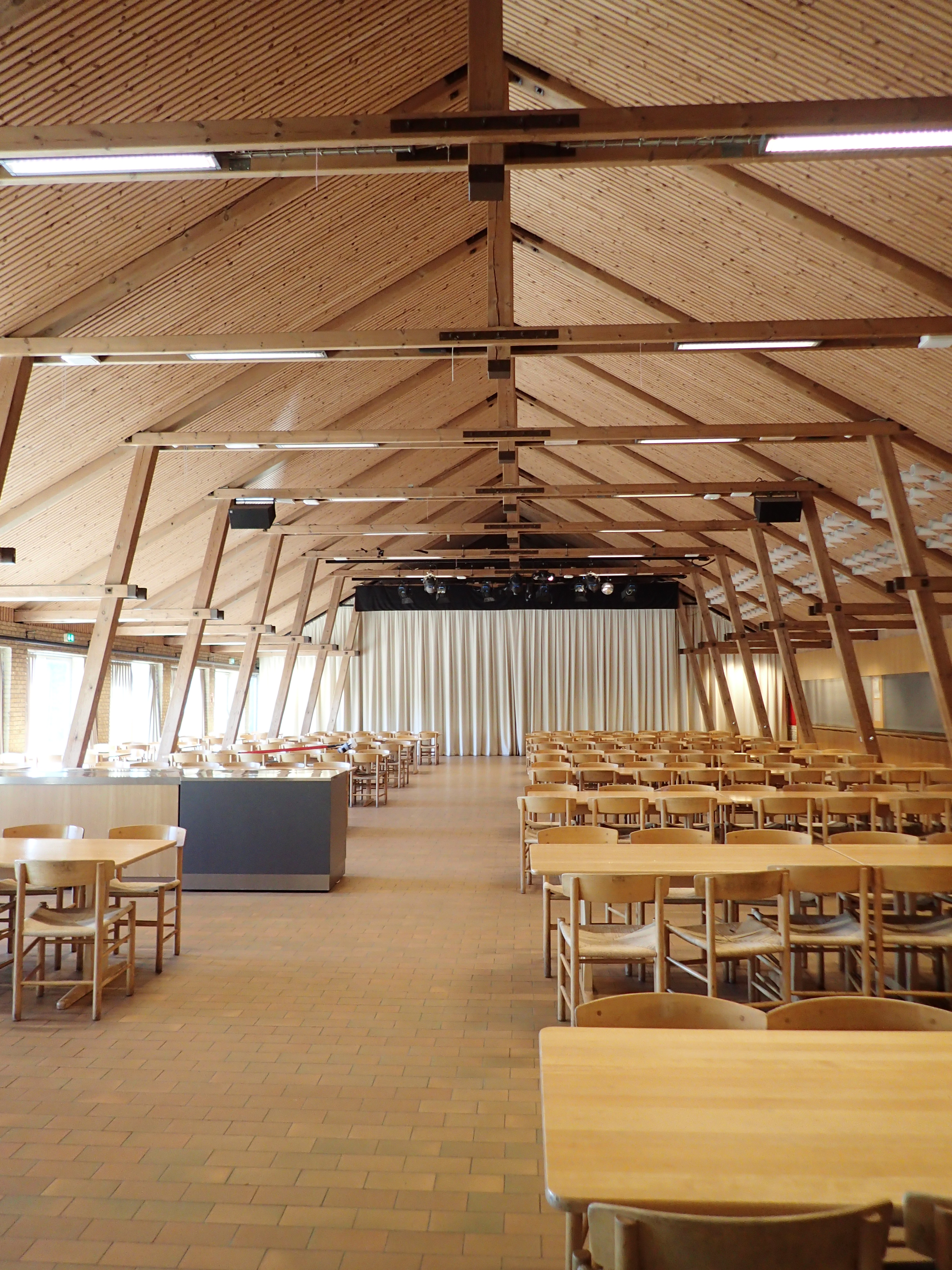
J39 chairs at Aarhus University

== Notable designs ==
Some notable designs originally created for FDB Møbler include the following:

- J16 rocking chair by Hans Wegner (1944) - Now produced by Fredericia
- J39 chair "The People's Chair" by Børge Mogensen (1947): Considered to be Mogensen's most successful chair, it has been in continuous production since its first release. It is now produced by Fredericia.
- J77 dining chair by Folke Pålsson (1947) It is now produced by Hay.
- J52B chair by Børge Mogensen (1952)
- J46 dining chair by Poul Volther (1956). Reported to have sold over 812,000 to 850,000 copies.
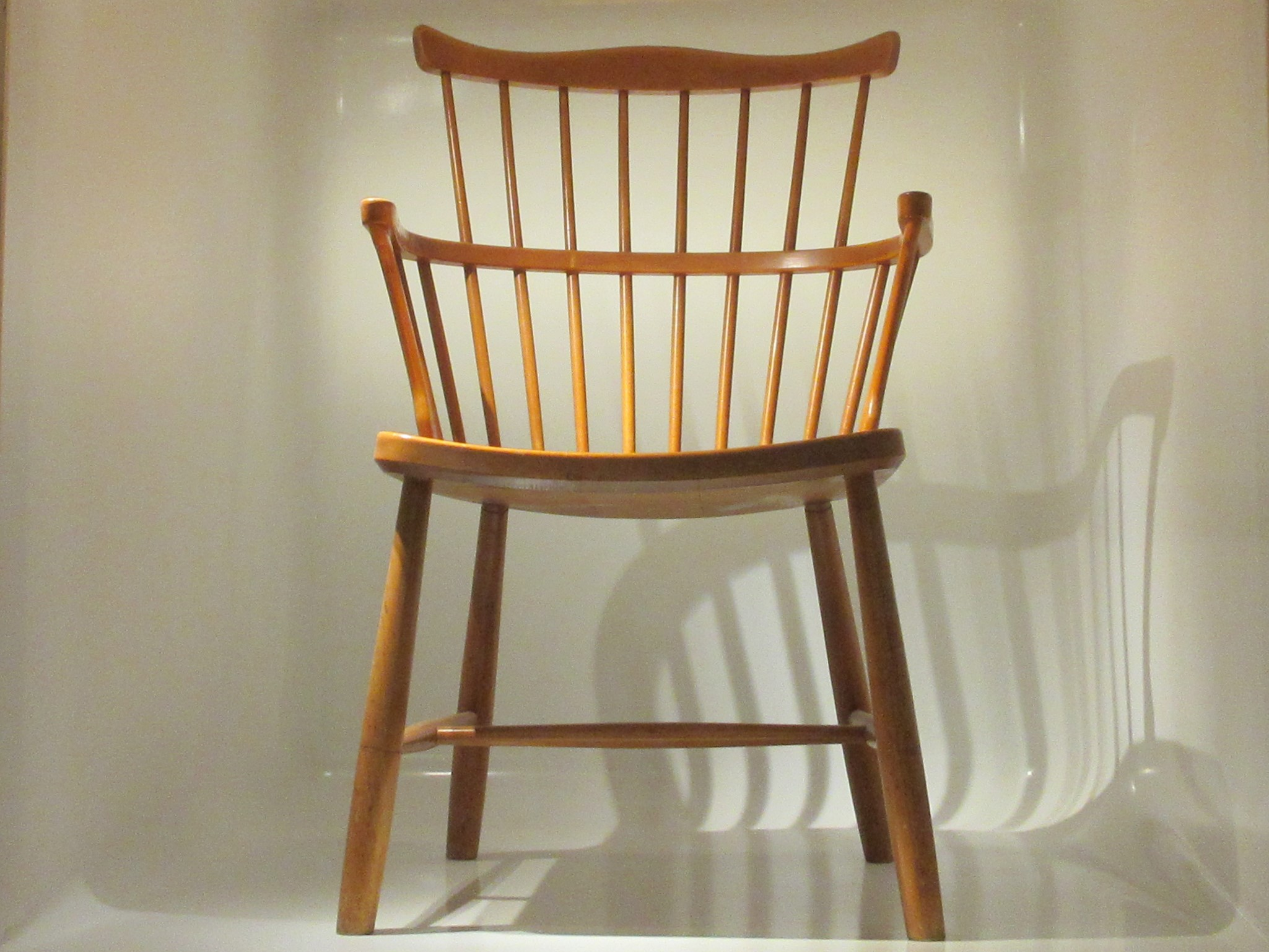
  J52B dining table chair at Designmuseum Danmark
