= August Sandgren =

Danish bookbinder

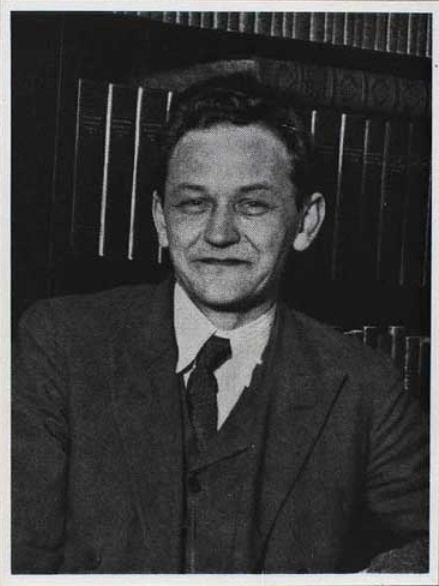
- August Sandgren
- Born: 13 January 1893; Hobro, Denmark
- Died: 13 November 1934 (aged 41); Copenhagen
- Occupation: Bookbinder
- Years active: 1920-1934

August Sandgren (1893 – 1934) was a Danish bookbinder. He was one of the best craftsmen of Denmark and a great designer who never compromised with the techniques of bookbinding.

August Sandgren craft is in its beautiful and simple style in line with the best in Danish design. Sandgren introduced functionalism to the art of bookbinding in Denmark and he was a major innovator in Danish book design. His bindings can naturally be included in the tradition of Danish design as for example the furniture designers Kaare Klint, Hans J. Wegner and Mogens Koch, architect Arne Jacobsen and silversmith Henning Koppel.

== Biography ==
August Sandgren took an apprenticeship in 1907-1911 and in 1912-19 he travelled and worked throughout Europe, including the Netherlands, Germany, Switzerland and France. When he was about to enter Italy, World War I broke out, and people stranded were put a train to Denmark. Sandgren however got off the train in Berlin, where he was joined by his younger brother Oscar Sandgren (1897-1982), also a bookbinder.

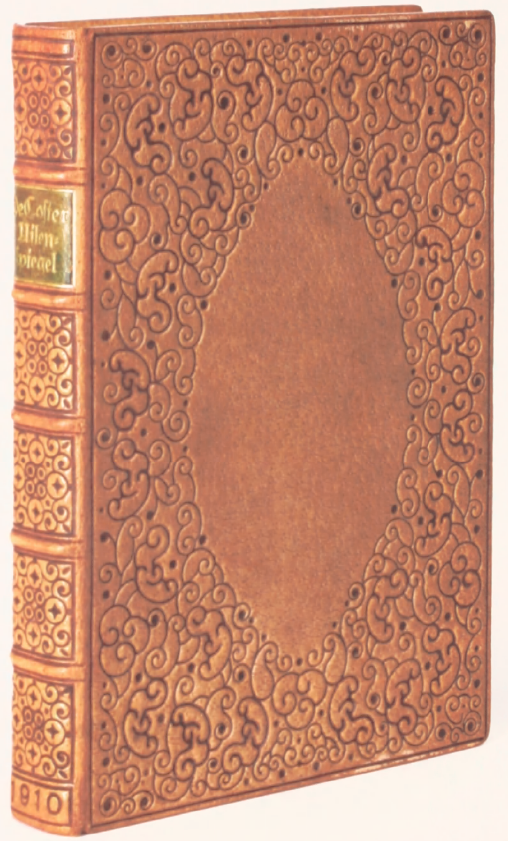
Full leather binding by August Sandgren 1912.

In Berlin August Sandgren perfected his art and took courses in typography and calligraphy. For a time he was enlisted in the Berlin Buchbinder Fachschule and attended in various workshops. In libraries and museums in Berlin he became acquainted with the work of the English bookbinder T.J. Cobden-Sanderson (1840-1922) from the Arts and Crafts movement, an inspiration for him in the first years. Sandgren was taught gilding by the master bookbinder Paul Kersten, and he achieved recognition for his great skills.

August Sandgren returned to Copenhagen in 1919 and set up his own workshop in 1920. Among his many customers were noteworthy Danish artists, including Axel Salto. He had several Danish libraries as customers, including The Royal Library, Denmark, and within a 14-year period he produced around 25,000 bookbindings for the Frederiksberg Library, his biggest customer.

He died from an incurable disease in 1934 and his workshop was continued by his widow and brother and later his son.

== Characteristics and importance ==
August Sandgren was a great artisan and craftsman and he had a very clear idea with his work: The bookbindings are to be beautiful and elegant, bound in the finest materials, while still being highly useful - i.e. they should be easy to recognize and find on the shelf, have titles on the spines that are easy to see and read, the books must be easy to open and keep open, and not easily worn. He was thus an early forerunner of functionalism in Danish design and turned from the previous generation of Danish bookbinders, especially Anker Kyster, who were inspired be the Arts and Crafts movement and Art Nouveau. Sandgren shunned the highly decorated and overloaded style and kept the decoration on his bindings to a minimum and achieved an unprecedented elegance in Danish crafts.

There is a well-formed unity to Sandgren's bindings where all the components – spine, sides, title etc. - are in complete balance. This is achieved by flat rather than rounded spines, flat heads and tails, and boards that are only marginally larger than the text block. The headbands are handmade and often red and green.

The best of Sandgren's bindings are in a simple and timeless design. On his famous full leather bindings, of which he made around 100, the decoration is limited to a gilt frame near the edges of the sides - e.g. a gilt line, pattern or geometric design - and the large central area of the sides are free from decoration, so the quality and colour of the leather is in focus. Sandgren only used the very best in goatskin or Morocco leather with a beautiful, natural structure, and his bindings are in subdued, darker colours, for example brown or red. His principle is not unlike the Danish furniture designers, like Hans Wegner, where the natural colors, textures and flexibility of the wood are highlighted in their furniture.

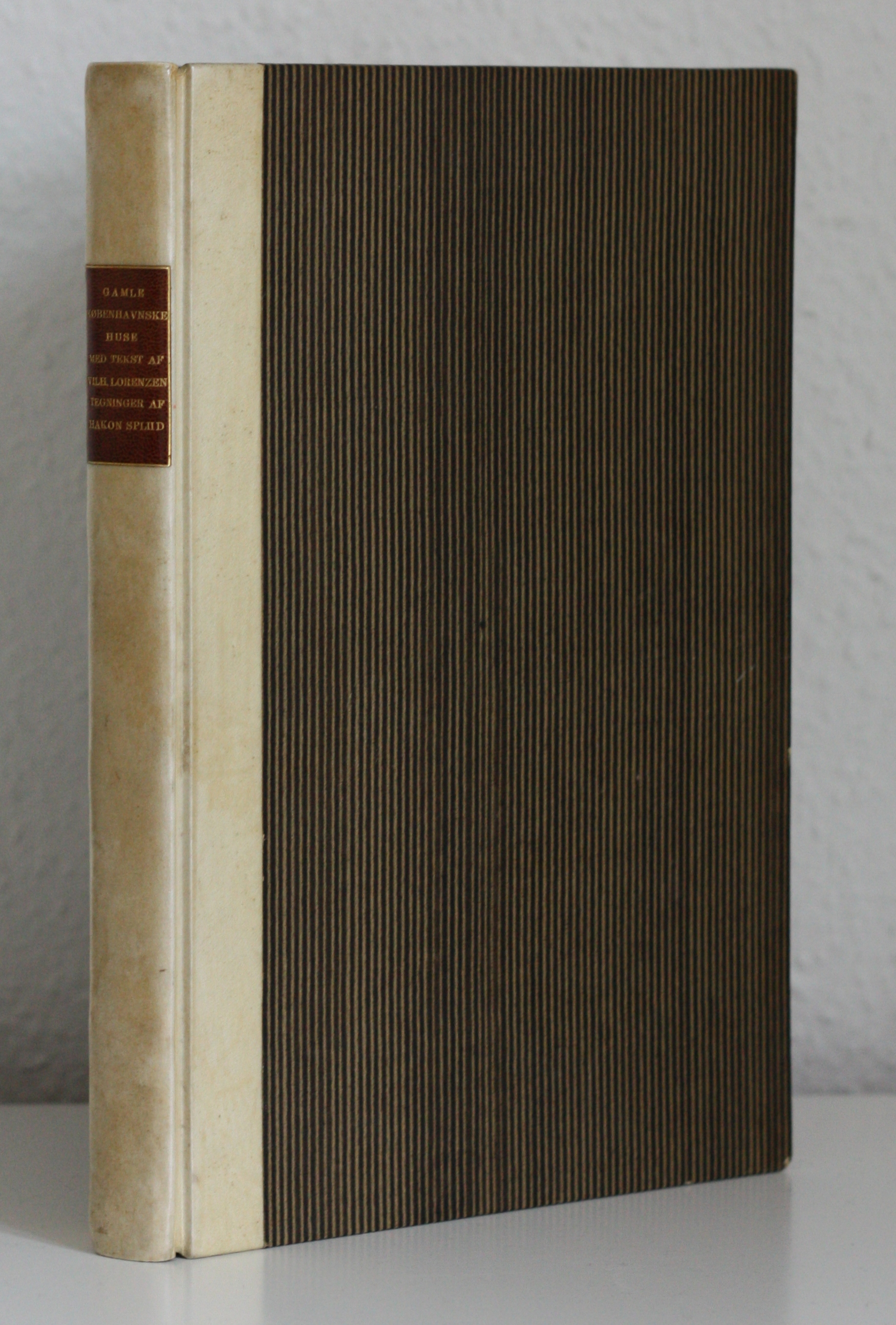
Sidepaper handmade by August Sandgren on a half vellum binding.

August Sandgren only used a small number of stamps to decorate the spines of the bindings, but he used them with great variety. He used marbled sidepaper, handmade by himself, and they were kept in darker colors - brown, black, dark green and blue, and the most beautiful paper has vertical, dense stripes.

August Sandgren transformed simple paper bindings into something luxurious, where he used his own marbled paper or beautiful handmade Italian paper. He reinforced the corners and heads of the paper bindings with vellum – an invention of his.

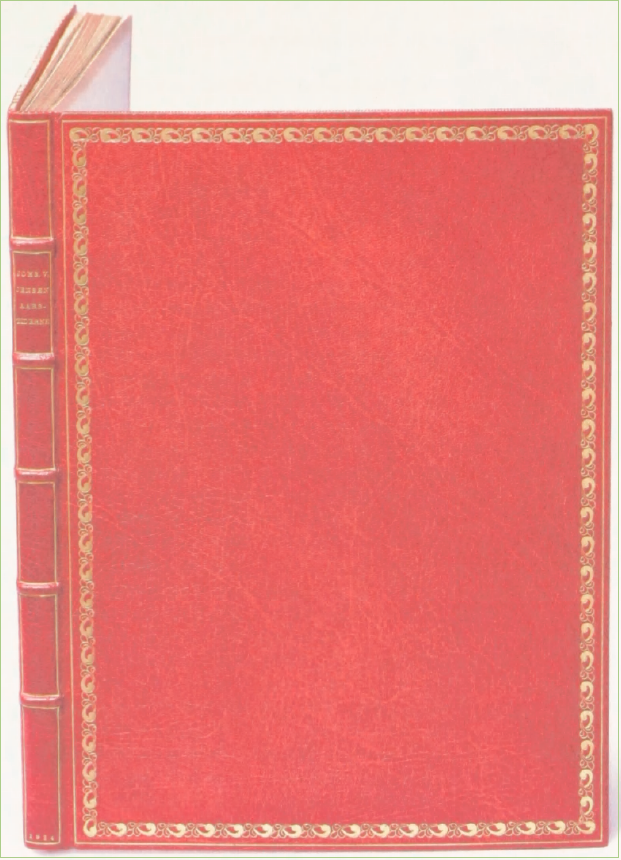
Red full leather binding with gilt decoration near the edges.

Vellum bindings were out of fashion at Sandgren's time, but he reintroduced the strong, white bindings and often calligraphed the titles on the spines in an artistic manner.

August Sandgren believed that the gilt titles on the spines are highly important, because the functionality and the decorative are as one. He was a great master of typography and justification, he preferred to use the same types as the book itself, he rarely used abbreviations, syllabifications or vertical titles. His gilding has rarely been surpassed in Danish bookbinding tradition.

August Sandgren also produced fine boxes and slipcases, and he made several thousand archive boxes for the Danish police.

August Sandgren was a part of the contemporary Danish art scene and worked in cooperation with the Danish artist Jais Nielsen, who did watercolor paintings on the most exclusive of Sandgren's full vellum bindings. In collaboration with Axel Salto he made very beautiful paper designs of geometric patterns and dark shades, which they called Salsan paper.

August Sandgren was part of the golden age of Danish design, he exhibited his bookbindings in the Danish Design Museum and was the founding member of a permanent exhibition of Danish arts and crafts, together with the silversmith Kay Bojesen.

His work and contribution to the Danish bookbinding tradition was celebrated in The Sandgren Society, which was founded in 1940 by the bookbinders Henrik Park, Niels Refsgaard, Bent Andrée, Jens Juul-Lassen and a number of other prominent Danish bookbinders and gilders. The Sandgren Society was an important institution for the discussion and development of Danish book design, the techniques bookbinding, and the more artistic aspects of bookbinding and was influential throughout the 20th century. The Sandgren Society published a book on August Sandgren in 1949.

Today August Sandgren's bookbindings are discussed and admired in various associations in Denmark, including the Danish Bibliophile Society. His bindings can be seen in The Danish Design Museum and in The Royal Library, Denmark.

August Sandgren's bindings are some of the most coveted among Danish and international book collectors and bibliophiles, due to their beauty, high technical quality and stylish design.

== Literature in Danish on August Sandgren ==
- Janner, Oswald (red.): Bogbinder August Sandgren, 1893–1934, Sandgren-Klubben, København 1949.
- Kristensen, Mikael: 'Sandgren, August' in Bogbindernes blå bog. Kunstfærdige danske bogbind ca. 1880–2000, Dansk Forening for Bogbind 2010, p. 552-562.
- Lassen, Birthe: 'August Sandgren' in Bogvennen 2006, Forening for Boghaandværk 2006, pp. 96–133.
- Park, Henrik & Carl Thomsen (red.): Bogbinderen August Sandgren, Forening for Boghaandværk, København 1952.
- Roos, Carl: 'August Sandgren, 13. Januar 1893 – 13. November 1934' in Bogvennen 1935, Forening for Boghaandværk, København 1935, pp. 61–66.
- Sandgren, August: 'Bogbind' i Bogvennen 1935, Forening for Boghaandværk, København 1935, pp. 52–54.
- Strand, Gustav: 'August Sandgren og ”Hjulet” i Bogvennen 1942, Forening for Boghaandværk, København 1942, pp. 129–138.
- Zahle, Erik: 'Danske Bogbinderi i vor Tid', in Bogvennen 1927, Forening for Boghaandværk, København 1927, pp. 54–94.
