= Carl Hansen & Søn =

Danish furniture company (1908)

- Type: Privately held
- Industry: Furniture
- Founded: 1908
- Founder: Carl Hansen
- Headquarters: Gelsted, Denmark
- Area served: Worldwide
- Products: High-end furniture
- Website: carlhansen.com

Carl Hansen & Søn is a family-owned Danish furniture company based on the island of Funen. Carl Hansen & Søn is the company behind many classical furniture designs by leading figures of the Danish modern movement but the company is also collaborating with contemporary designers. Knud Erik Hansen, its current owner and CEO, is the grandson of the founder.

== History ==
The company was founded by master cabinetmaker Carl Hansen when he opened his first workshop in Odense on 28 October 1908. His first real factory opened in 1915, specializing in bed room furniture for the bourgeoisie and landed gentry on the island of Funen.

The global economic crisis which arrived with the 1930s also affected furniture sales in Denmark. It hit Carl Hansen hard and in 1934 his second-oldest son, Holger Hansen, took over the business after his father. A contract with the American sewing machine manufacturer Singer for the production of wooden cases for some of their models helped the company through the difficult times. Hansen Jr. also set up a small-scale export of furniture to Sweden.

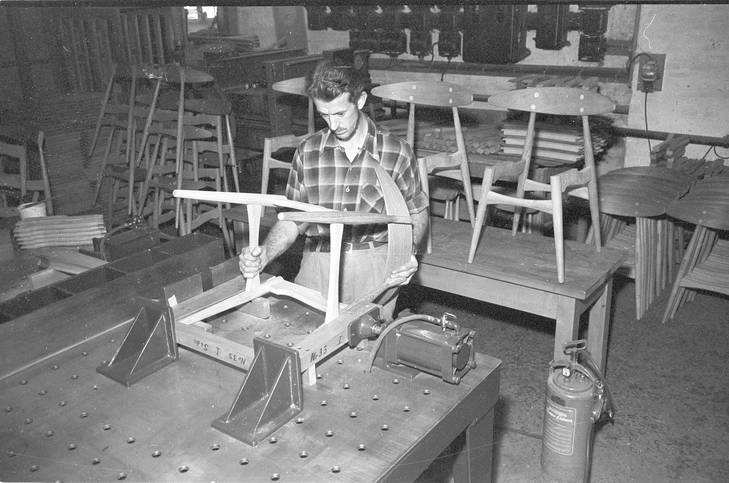
Working constructs Hans Wegner's CH33 chair at factory in 1958

In the years after World War II, a new generation of young Danish furniture designers such as Finn Juhl, Hans J. Wegner and Børge Mogensen. Carl Hansen & Søn as the company was now called entered into a collaboration with the salesman Ejvind Kold Christensen who had an eye for the new trends. In 1949, he set up a meeting between Wegner and Holger Hansen which resulted in a lasting collaboration between the two parties. Instead of just promoting their furniture to retailers, the company also began a comprehensive exhibition and advertisement activity targeted on end consumers.

In the early 1950s, modern Danish furniture design also began to attract attention abroad and especially in the US. Together with four other manufacturers of Wegner furniture, Carl Hansen & Søn established a joint sales company, Salesco, which was responsible for exhibitions and marketing abroad, including on the furniture fairs in Cologne. The Y Chair was a particularly big success for Hansen & Søn, accounting for more than half of its sales. In 1968, a failed exclusivity agreement with a dealer put a temporary end to the success on the US market.

The 1970s and 1980s were generally difficult times for Hansen & Søn. In 1988, Holger Hansen's son, cabinetmaker Jørgen Gerner Hansen, took over the company. He invested in new machines. The early 1990s brought a renewed interest in Danish furniture classics and a Japanese subsidiary was established in 1991. Carl Hansen & Søn relaunched several retired Wegner designs. In 2001, Carl Hansen & Søn purchased Tranekær Furniture, another high-end furniture manufacturer, located at the Tranekjær estate on the neighbouring island of Langeland.

The company's former logo. Active from the mid-1980s to 2014.

In the mid-1980s, the company commissioned Bernt Petersen to design new logo featuring a white C within a blue square.

In 2002, Jørgen Gerners' brother, Knud Erik Hansen, acquired all shares in the company. He built a new factory in Aarup and internationalized the organization, leading to an increase in export from 20% in 1998 to over 50% in 2008.

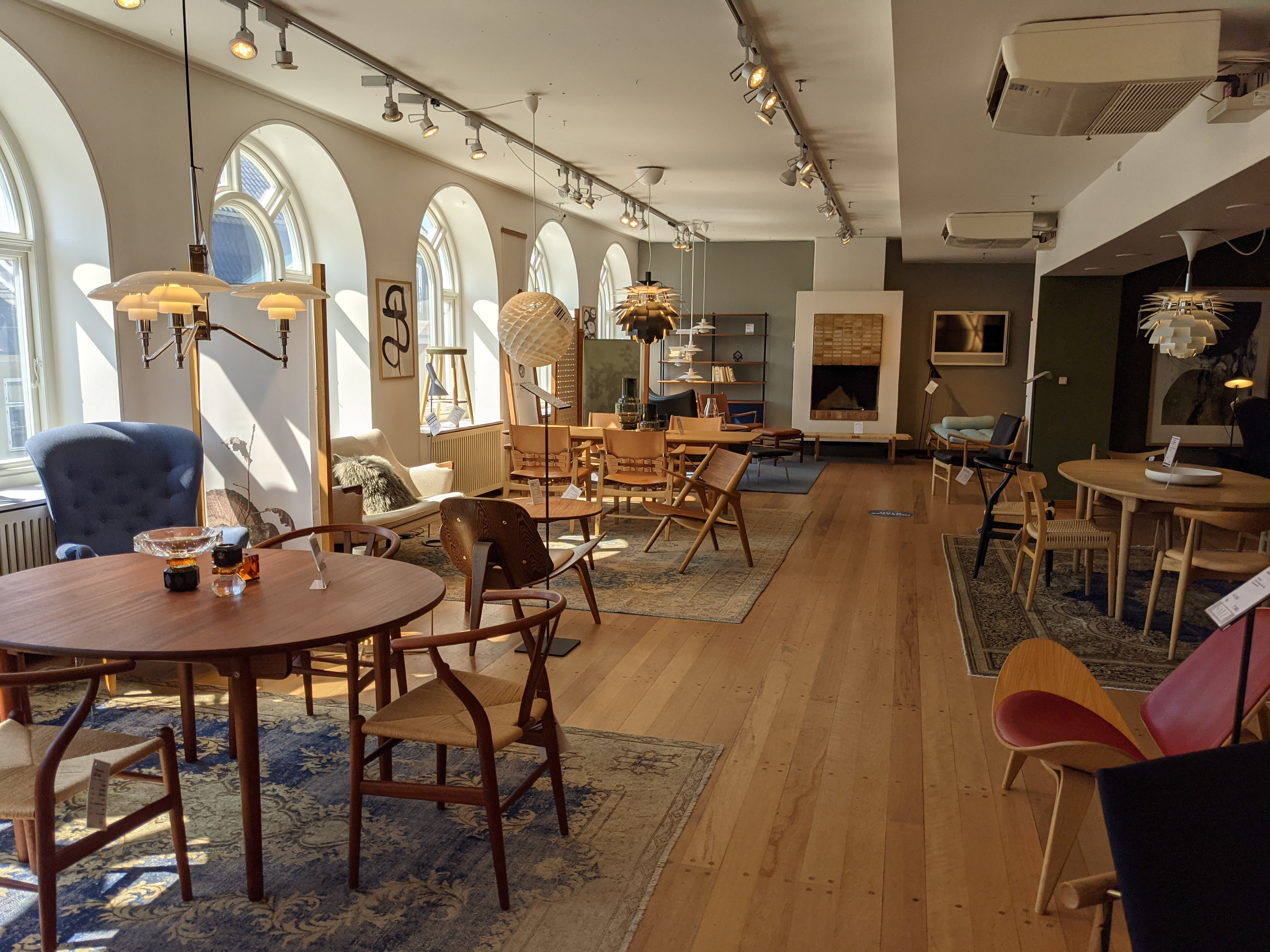
Carl Hansen section at Illums Bolighus

In 2011, Carl Hansen & Søn took over the highend Rud. Rasmussen furniture workshop in Copenhagen, notable for its production of furniture by Mogens Koch and Kaare Klint. An attempt to incorporate luxury products in the product portfolio failed and in 2016 Carl Hansen & Søn abolished Rud. Rasmussen as an independent brand and all employees are dismissed.

in 2014, Carl Hansen & Søn returned to their earlier logo designed by Hans Wegner in 1950. The release of the restored logo coincide with the 100-year anniversary of Wegner's birthday. This replaced the logo created by Bernt Petersen.

== Designers ==
Carl Hansen & Søn is the manufacturer of many classical furniture designs from the period now known as Danish Modern by designers such as Hans J. Wegner, Kaare Klint, Arne Jacobsen, Ole Wanscher, Børge Mogensen and Poul Kjærholm.

The company has also collaborated with contemporary designers such as Tadao Ando, EOOS, Naja Utzon Popov, Anker Bak and Brad Ascalon.

== Location ==
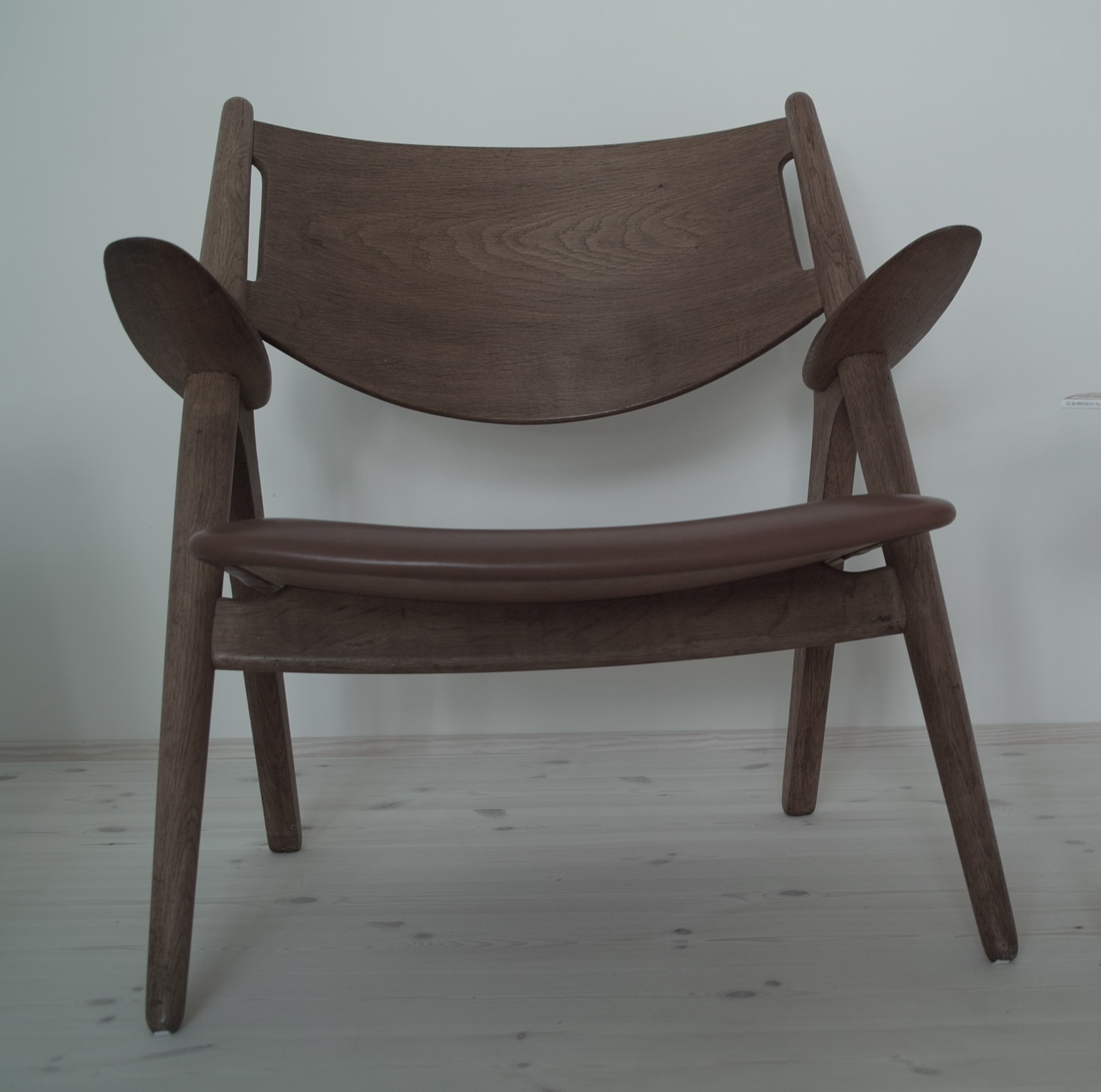
Wegner's Sawhorse Easy Chair (CH28)

Carl Hansen & Søn is headquartered at its factory in Gelsted outside Odense.

=== Flagship stores ===
In 2013, Carl Hansen & Søn opened a new flagship store at Bredgade in Copenhagen. Japan is the company's second most important market outside Scandinavia. It opened a flagship store in Tokyo in 2014 and another one in Osaka in 2018. In 2022 they opened another store in Copenhagen in the Carlsberg.

== Furniture ==
- Elbow Chair (CH20)
- Shell Chair (CH07)
- Easy Chair (CH25)
- Wishbone Chair (CH24)
- Sawbuck Chair (CH29)
