= Wishbone chair =

Type of chair by Hans Wegner

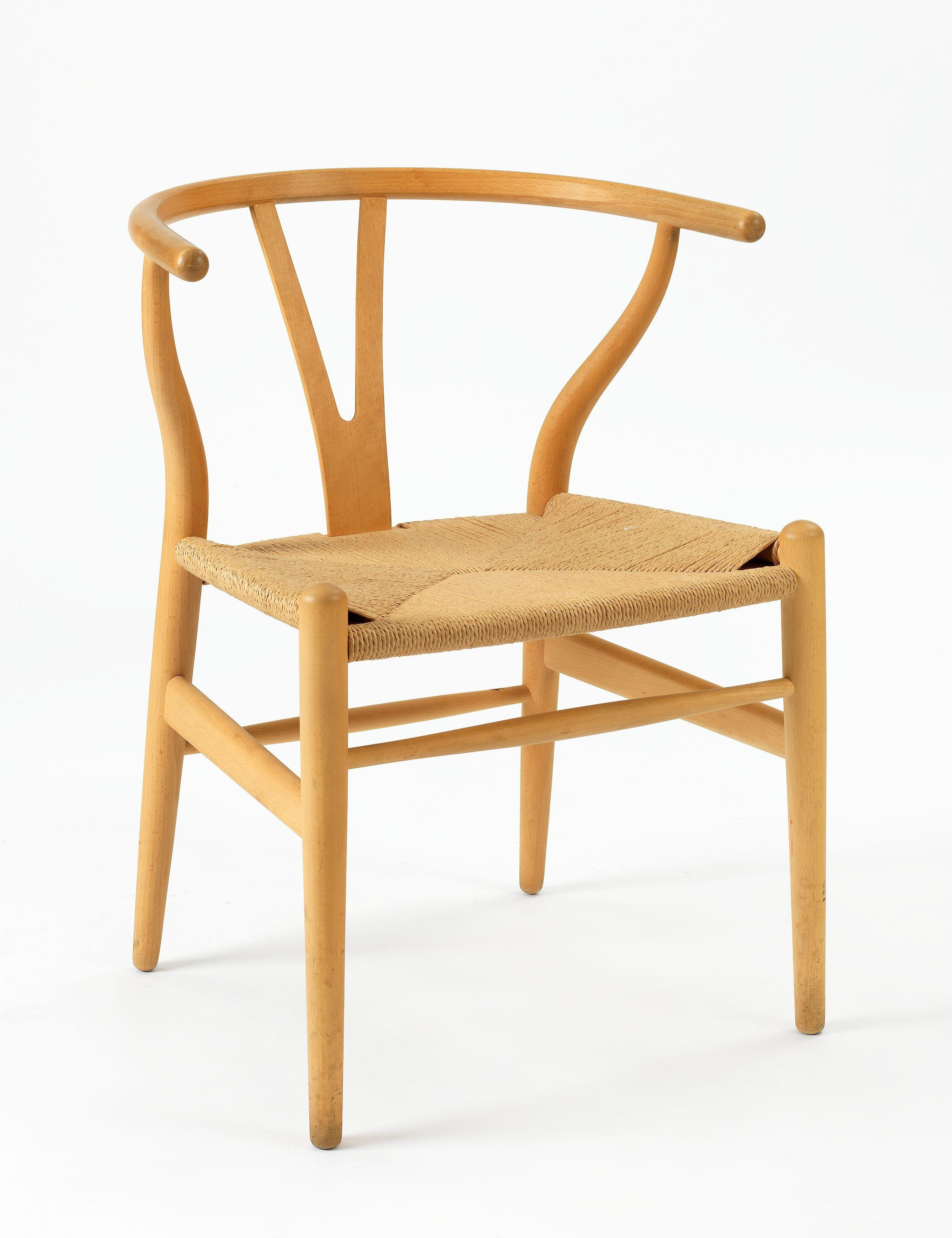
- Designer: Hans Wegner
- Date: 1949
- Made in: Denmark
- Style / tradition: Danish
- Height: 29.5 inches (75 cm)
- Width: 21.75 inches (55.2 cm)
- Depth: 20 inches (51 cm)

The Wishbone Chair, also known as the CH24 Chair or Y Chair, is a chair designed by Hans Wegner in 1949 for Carl Hansen & Søn. The chair features a bentwood armrest and a paper cord rope seat in a woven envelope pattern. The chair is named after the Y or wishbone-shaped backrest. The design was inspired by Ming-era chairs.

The chair, Wegner's best-selling design, is a notable example of Danish furniture design. The chair has been in continuous production since its original release. The chair is especially popular in Japan, where sales in the country account for more than a quarter of the annual production. There is an entire book dedicated to the chair published in the Japanese language.

[The Wishbone chair] is an understated work of simplicity and comfort, its graceful shape hinting at both East Asian design and modernist ideals.

— Hans Wegner's obituary in The New York Times

== History ==
Inspirations for the Wishbone Chair

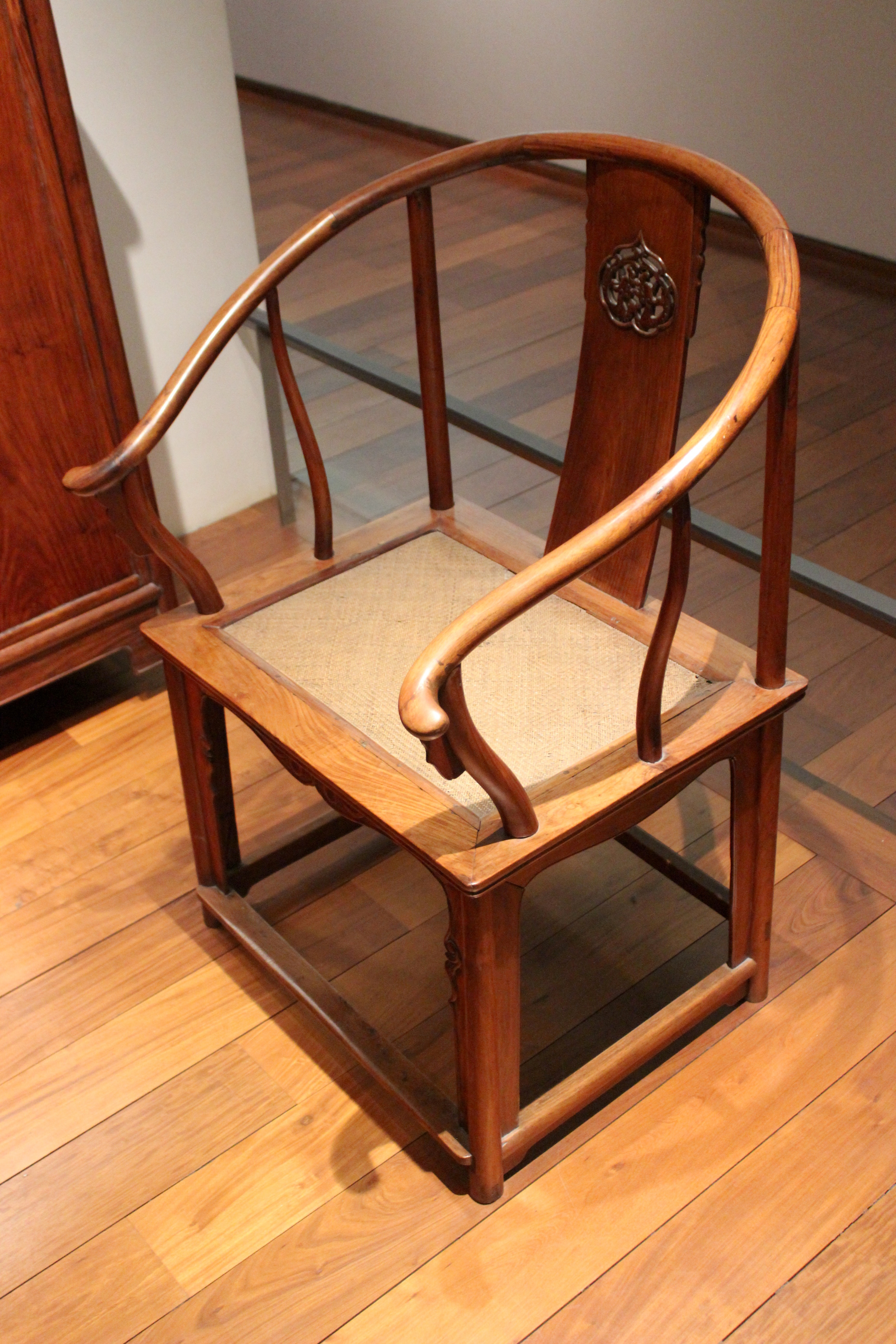
Wooden chairs from the Ming Dynasty

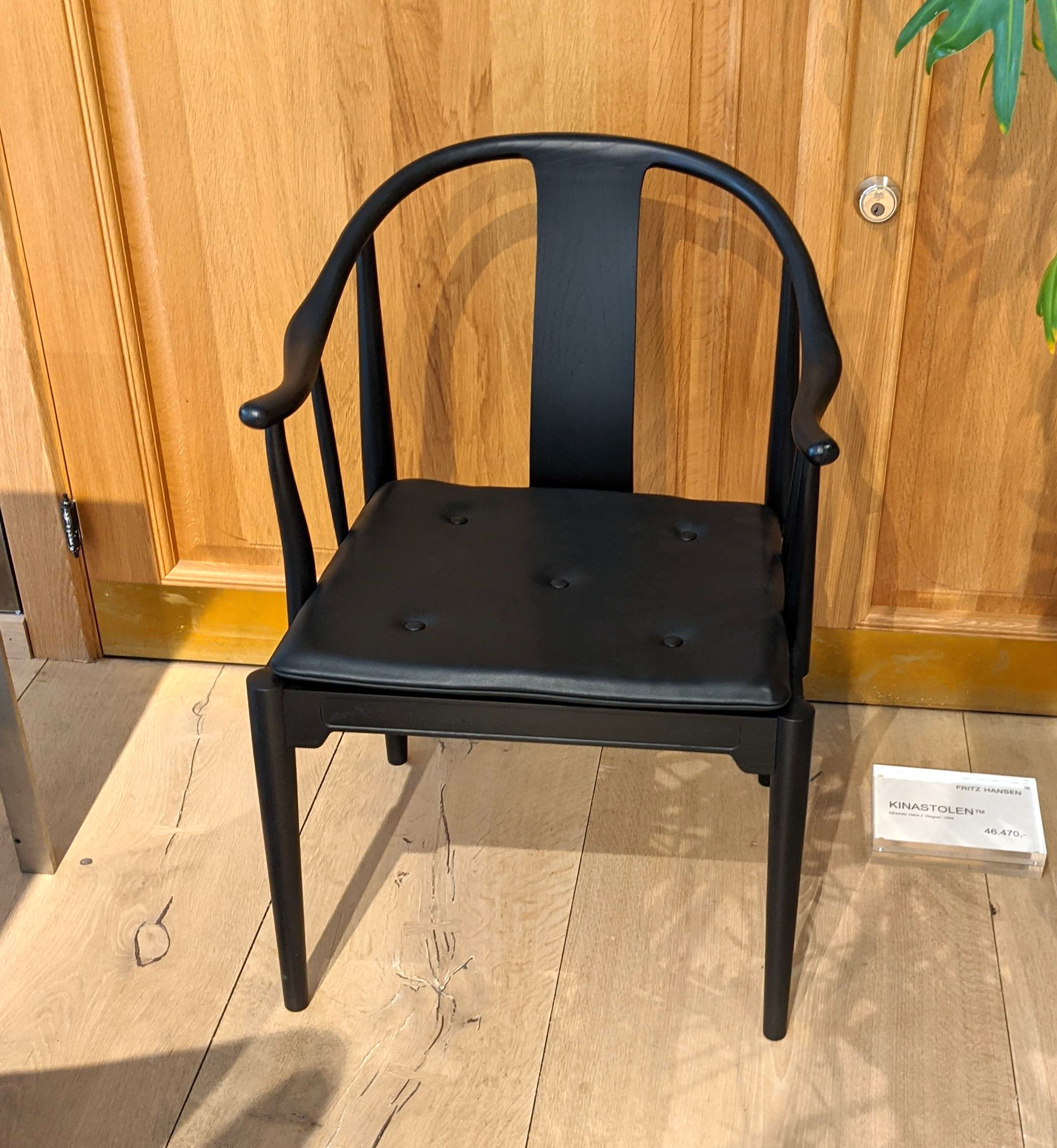
Hans Wegner's first Chinese Chair

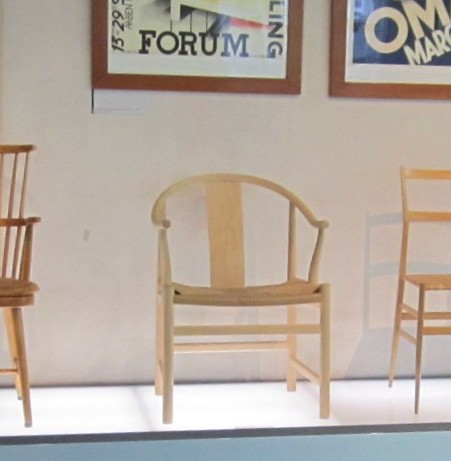
Wegner's Fourth China Chair

In 1948, Holger Hansen of Carl Hansen & Søn and Mogens Tuck of Andreas Tuck co-commissioned Wegner to produce nine pieces of furniture. Wegner would create four tables for Andreas Tuck and four chairs and a sideboard for Carl Hansen & Søn. The companies worked closely together and benefited from jointly marketing their chairs and tables.

Wegner produced CH22, CH23, CH24, and CH25 for the chairs and CH304 for the sideboard. CH24, soon to be known as the Wishbone Chair, was an iteration of Wegner's Chinese Chair series. The Chinese Chairs were produced for Fritz Hansen starting in 1944 and took inspiration from the round wooden seats of Ming China.

Hansen was initially displeased with Wegner's designs, which he felt resembled garden furniture, and the complexity of the manufacturing required to bring the items into production. The manufacturing process was beyond the scope of Carl Hansen & Søn's factory; the back legs of the Wishbone chair had to be turned by a sub-supplier, and the steam bending of the top bar had to be done at an outside factory. Nevertheless, all of the chair designs went into production the following year. The Wishbone Chair became his greatest commercial success and has remained in continuous production. In the mid-1990s, Carl Hansen & Søn increased the seat height of the chair by 2 cm to reflect the increase in height of the European and American populations purchasing the chair. The chair in its original dimensions is still produced and sold in Asia.

Each year, Carl Hansen & Son releases a limited edition of the chair in honor of Wegner's birthday. In 2018, they released a dark oak wood. In 2019, they released a version with a leather seat. In 2020, they released the chair in navy blue.

== Gallery ==
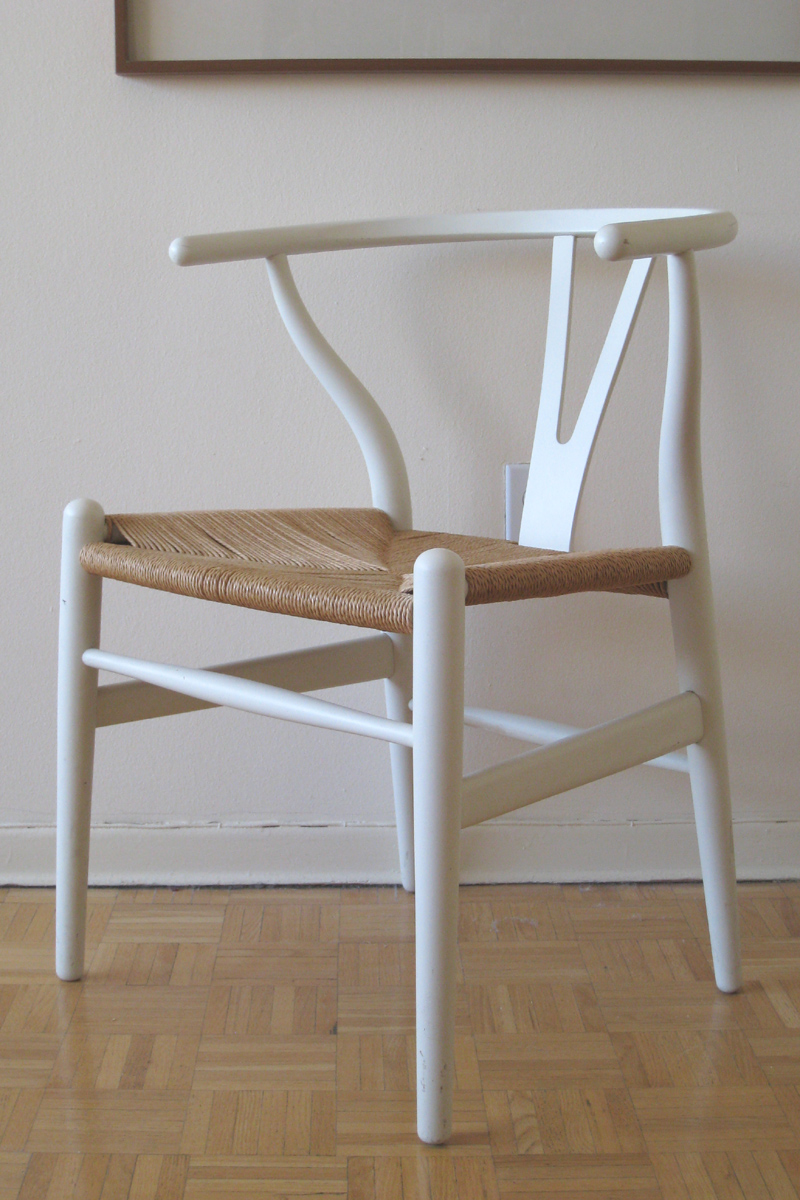
Wishbone Chair in white

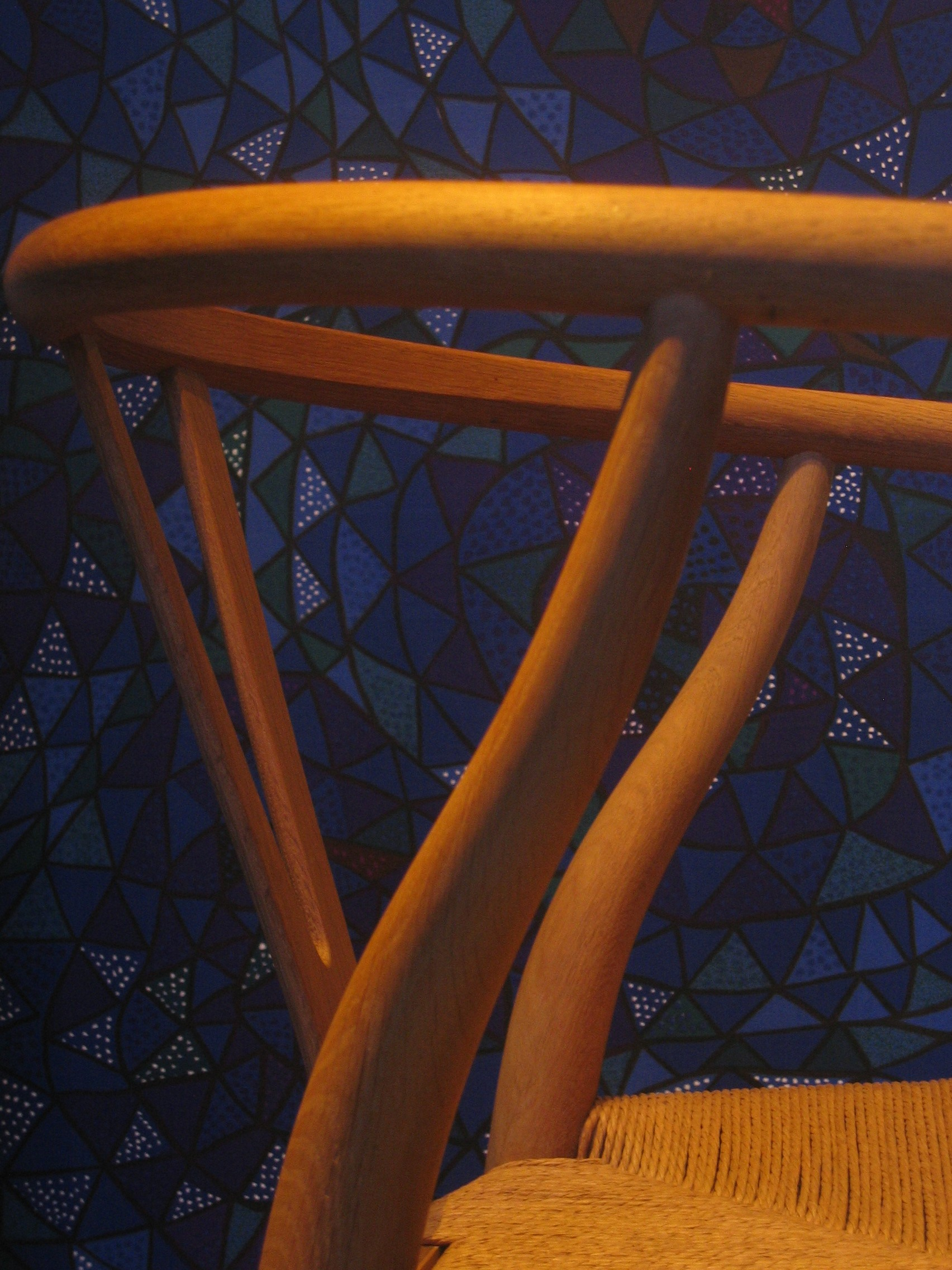
Close-up view

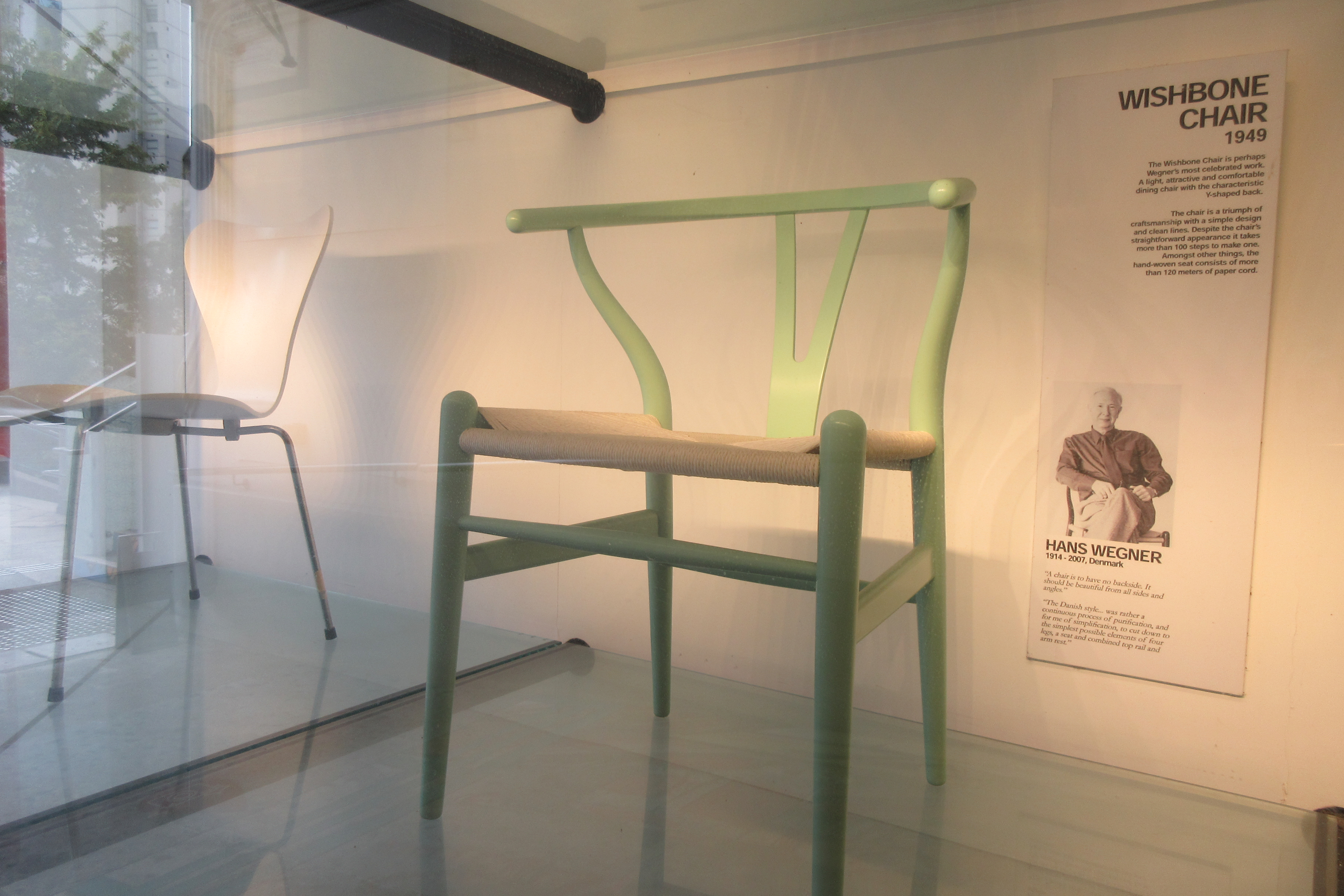
The Wishbone Chair on display

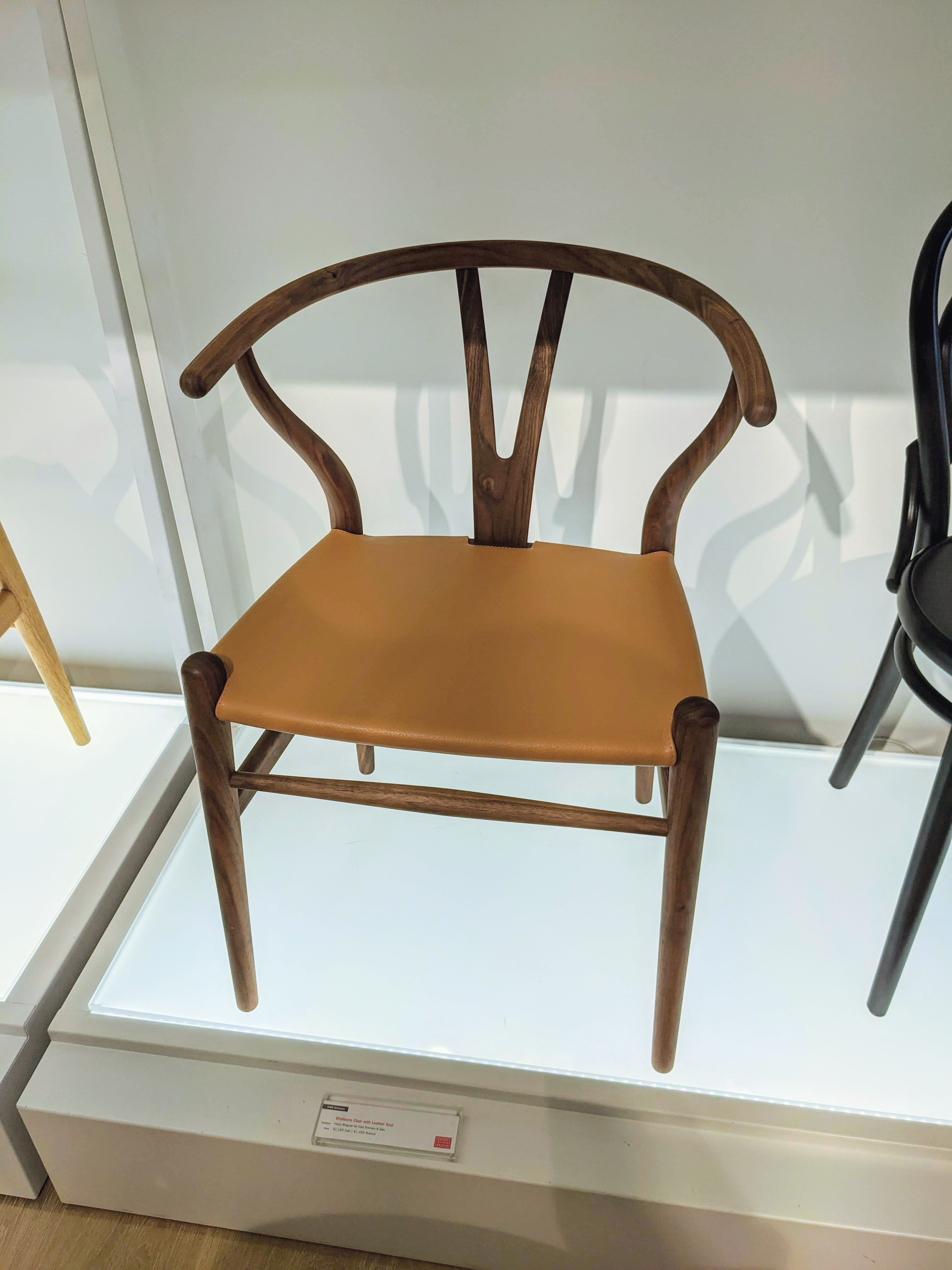
Limited edition Wishbone Chair with leather seat

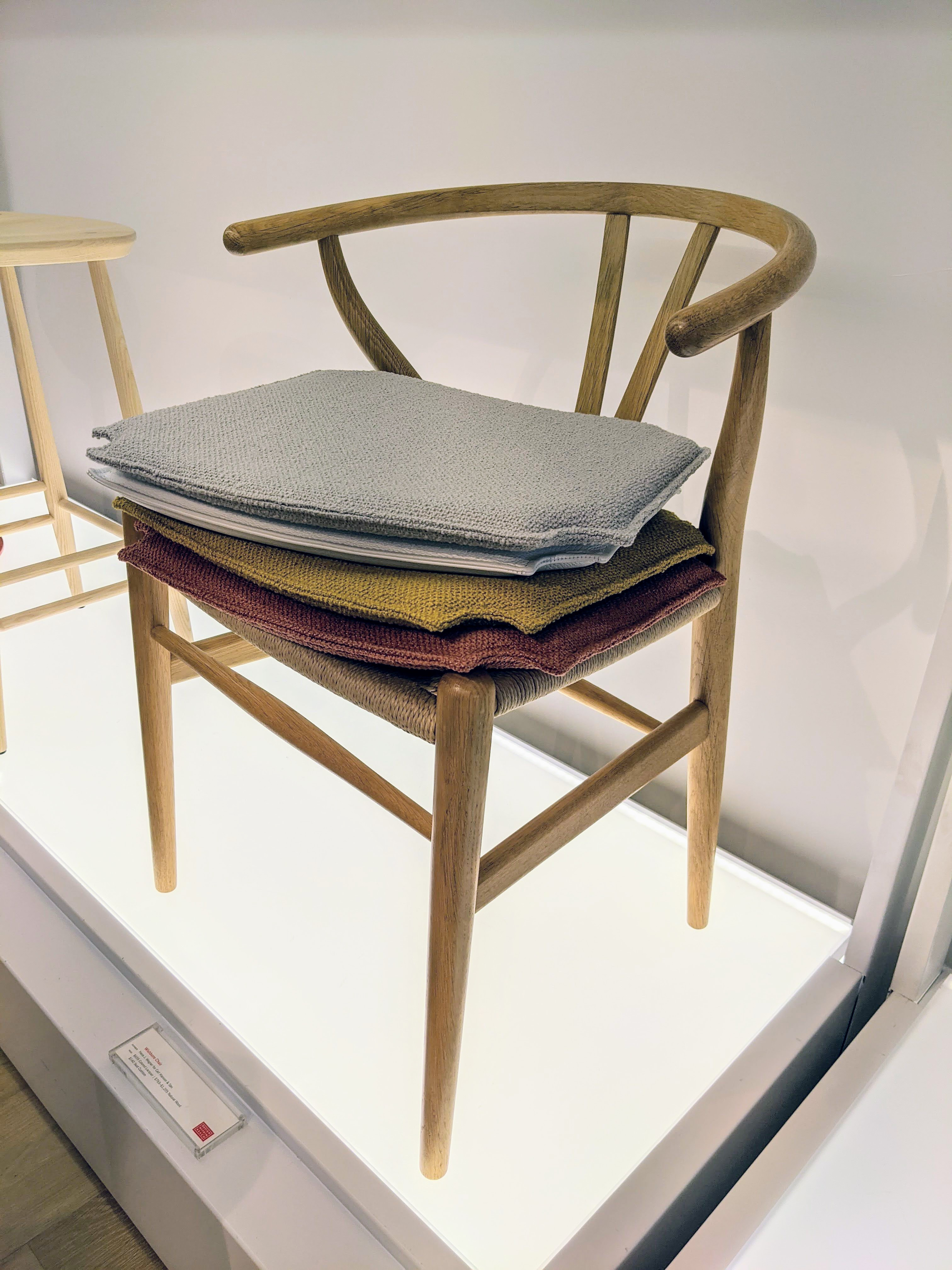
Wishbone Chair with accessory seat covers on display

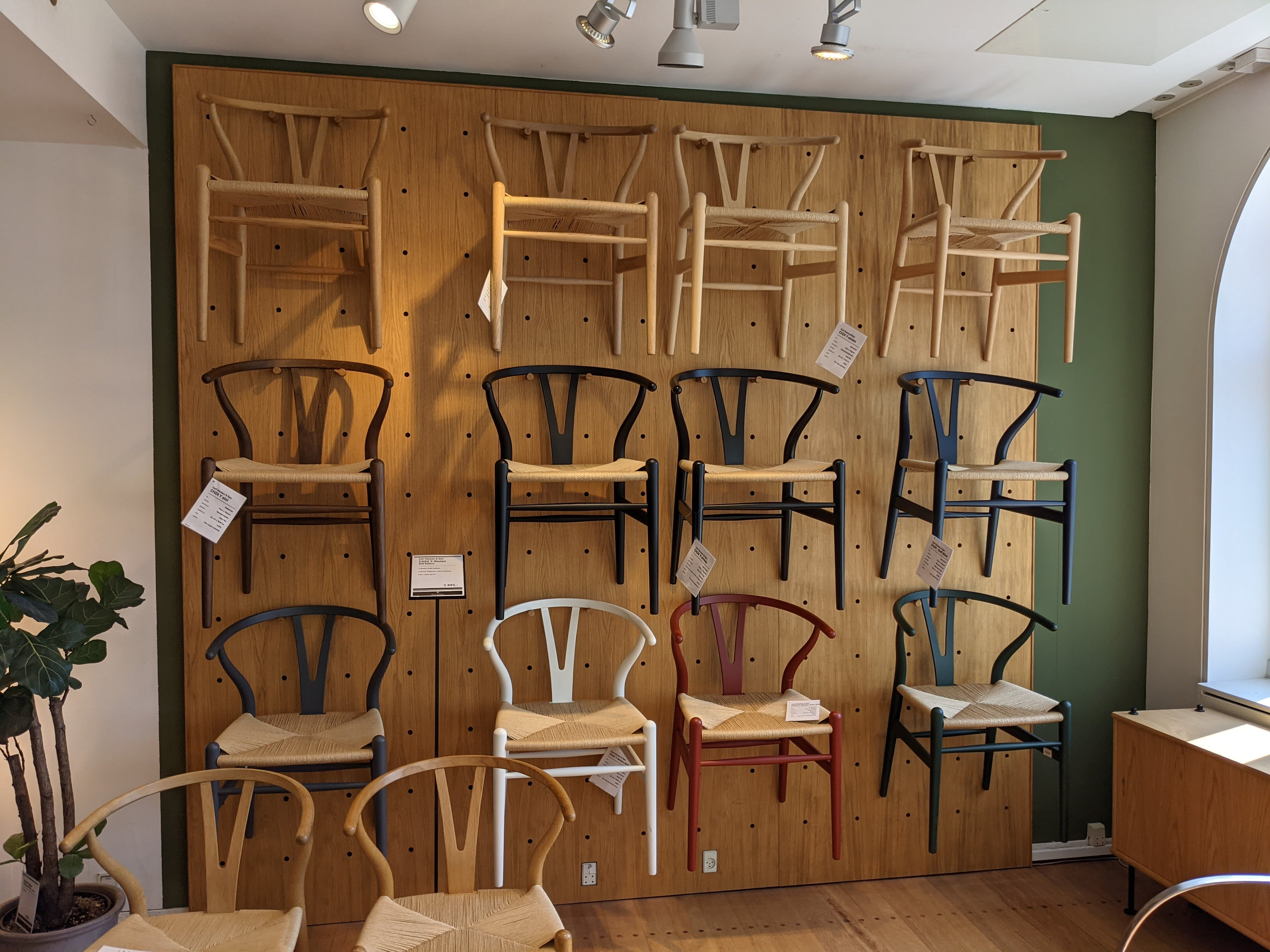
Wishbone Chairs on display at Illums Bolighus
