= Peter Lind =

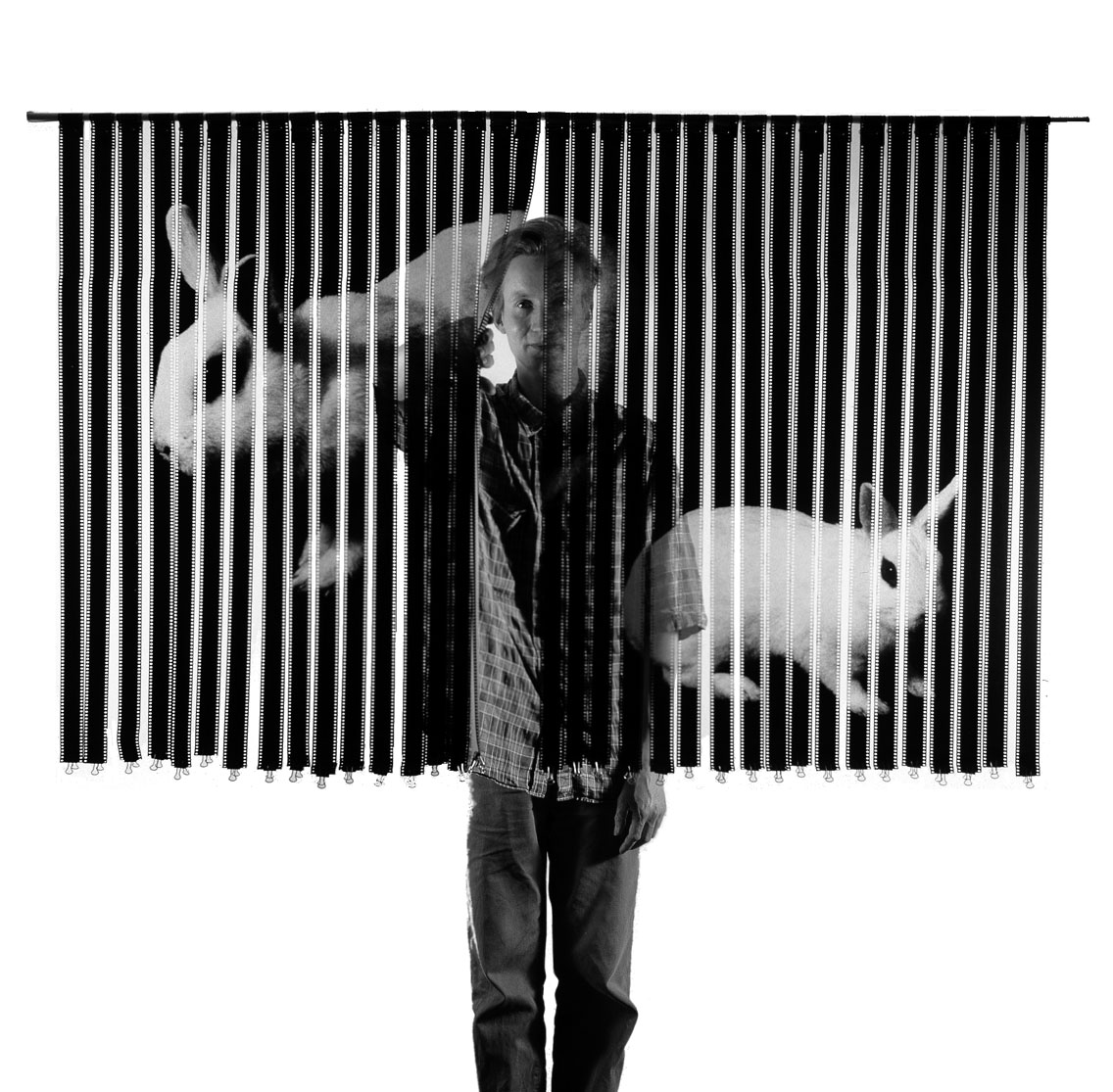
- Born: 1961 (age 64–65); Copenhagen, Denmark
- Website: www.peterlind.org

Peter Lind (born 1961) is a Danish photographer, Contemporary artist and New Media Art artist. Peter Lind's work is based on documentary observations, and stands at the crossroads of conceptual photography, installation and Narrative structure. He has been exhibited in : Austria, Australia, Argentina, Denmark, France, Germany, Greece, USA, Italy, Spain, Poland, Sweden, Vietnam.

Lind was born in Copenhagen. He studied cinematography at the Istituto di Scienze Cinematografiche e Audiovisive in Florence, 1983, and University of Copenhagen 1984. His work is permanently represented in several public collections: Brandts Museum of Photographic Art, National Museum of Photography, The Danish Art Foundation (Statens Kunstfond)

== Publications ==
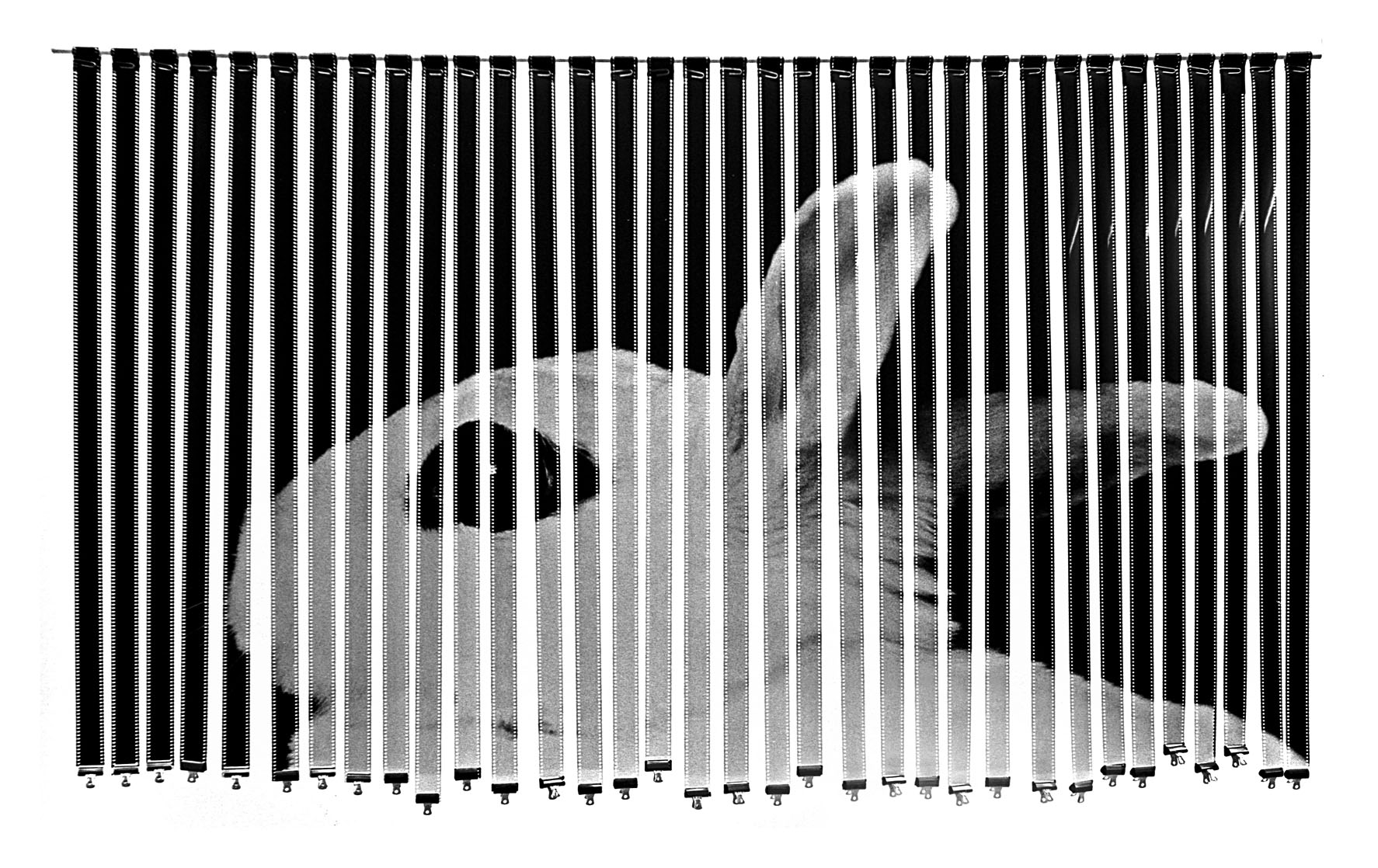
Contemporary artwork by Peter Lind. Acquired by the Danish Art Foundation.

- Film city. Catalogue of an exhibition held at Greenaway Art Gallery, 3–28 February 1999.
- The Royal Library Denmark − CD-ROM: From here to here to there to there to here 2001
- The cat lab, by Peter Lind: Documentation of the exhibition, 27. May – 2. July 2016. ISBN 978-87-987920-1-7
- Reverse collection. 2018ISBN 9788798792031
