= Børge Mogensen =

Danish furniture designer (1914–1972)

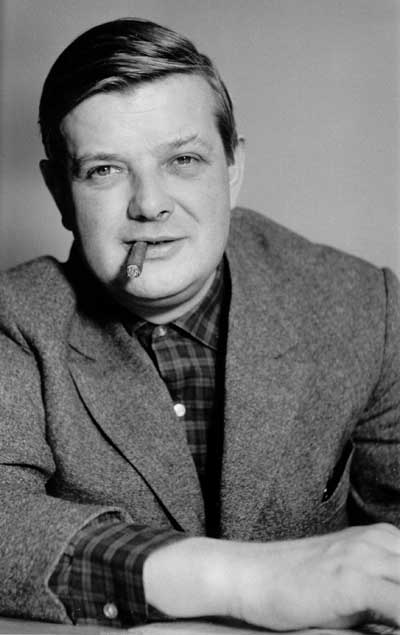
- Born: 13 April 1914; Aarhus, Denmark
- Died: 5 October 1972 (aged 58); Gentofte, Denmark
- Occupation: Architect
- Awards: Honorary Royal Designer for Industry (1972); C. F. Hansen Medal (1972)

Børge Mogensen (13 April 1914 – 5 October 1972), was a Danish furniture designer.

He was a leading figure among a generation of furniture designers who made the concept of “Danish Modern”. Together with colleagues such as Arne Jacobsen and Hans Wegner, Mogensen created international recognition for Danish furniture design, and his designs have for more than half a century enjoyed worldwide demand.

== Early years ==
Børge Mogensen was born in Aarhus, Denmark. He started as a cabinetmaker in 1934, and studied furniture design at the Danish School of Arts and Crafts in Copenhagen from 1936 to 1938, and then trained as an architect (from 1938 to 1942) at the Royal Danish Academy of Fine Arts' School of Architecture graduating in 1942. From 1938 to 1943 he worked at various design studios in Copenhagen, including with Kaare Klint. 1942–1950 he was manager of FDB's furniture design studio, Copenhagen and in 1945 was awarded the Bissen Scholarship, Denmark. 1945–47, he was teaching assistant with Professor Kaare Klint at the Royal Danish Academy of Fine Arts' School of Architecture, Copenhagen. In 1950 he was awarded the Eckersberg Medal and in 1950–1972. In 1950 he left FDB's furniture design studio to found his own design studio. His work has been featured in one-man exhibitions in Zurich, London, New York City, Stockholm, Paris and Copenhagen, and his many awards for design include the Eckersberg Medaillen (1950) and the C.F. Hansen medal (1972). He was married to Alice Mogensen (1916–2011), they had two sons.

== Time with Klint ==
During his time with Kaare Klint, Mogensen fostered a deep commitment to producing classical, simple and highly functional furniture. He also became interested in researching contemporary lifestyles, in order to develop domestic objects that are customized for specific uses. Continuing Klint's innovative studies in how the size and proportion of objects should influence their design, Mogensen, collaborating with Grethe Meyer, produced a project in 1954 called the Boligens Byggeskabe (Construction Cupboards of the House), which introduced the idea of building shelving and storage units as part of a room, rather than purchasing and placing them in the space. Mogensen did studies to determine the standard measures for common objects, such as cutlery and shirts, and how many of each item the average person owned. With this information he developed a set of figures for the base width and depth of drawers and shelves, and his information tables were published as a manual on building storage systems. Between 1955 and 1967 he worked on the related "Øresund" shelving series that took on the mammoth task of solving every storage need that could arise in the modern home.

== Furniture design ==
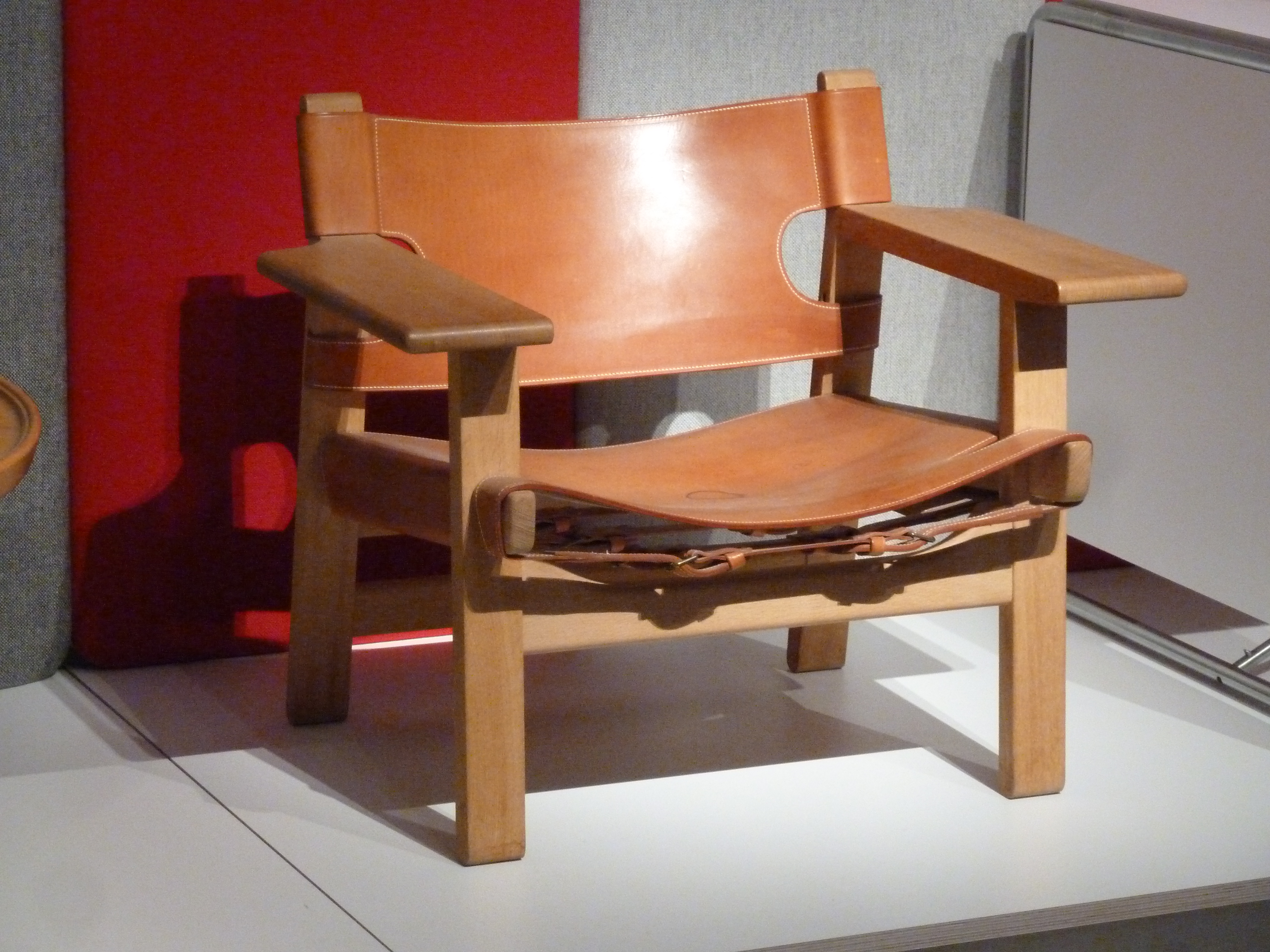
Spanish Chair (1959)

In addition to mapping out the terrain of home storage, Mogensen was a prolific furniture designer, exhibiting almost every year at the Copenhagen Cabinetmaker's Guild Exhibitions. He was also the Head of Furniture Design during the 1940s for FDB Møbler. His furniture, strongly representative of his training as a traditional craftsman, was greatly appreciated by a public who had not yet become interested in modernism and the changes its influence had created on furniture and the decorative arts. Mogensen appeased these sceptics with his classical designs, but also, from the beginning of his career, subtly incorporated new ideas into his revisitation of traditional forms. He designed a sofa in 1945 with leather ties which allowed the sides to be dropped down. A 1949 chair, claimed by critics to be "a model for future chairs," used a curved, slightly sloping backrest, cut out along the spine in an organic dewdrop shape. A 1951 interior for the Cabinetmaker's show combined Danish oak with leather upholstery and slate tiling in a way that articulated a new grouping of materials. "This is Where We Live, " a family room set he designed in 1953, dealt with the new concept of a living room that would contain a workbench and a sewing table, encouraging members of the family to take part in several activities simultaneously.

== Late 50s and early 60s ==
By the end of the decade, however, Mogensen had re-embraced a more straightforward functionalism that Klaus Meedom, writing about the Cabinetmaker's exhibit, said was "so strict that he has to violate his own rules to be able to breathe freely." A redesigned "Spanish" chair in 1959 was praised for its elegance and materials. He designed a set of simple, sturdy and modest furniture for a seaside cottage in 1959, a very traditional oak table and chair set in 1960 and a set in pine to furnish a "husband's study" in 1962. Mogensen also collaborated extensively with weaver Lis Ahlmann on textile designs, and, after Klint's death in 1954, succeeded him as designer to the Danish Museum of Decorative Art.

== Awards and distinctions ==
- 1972 Honorary Royal Designer for Industry, London

== See also ==
- Danish modern
