= Designmuseum Denmark =

Art museum in Copenhagen

Danish Museum of Art & Design
- Designmuseum Danmark
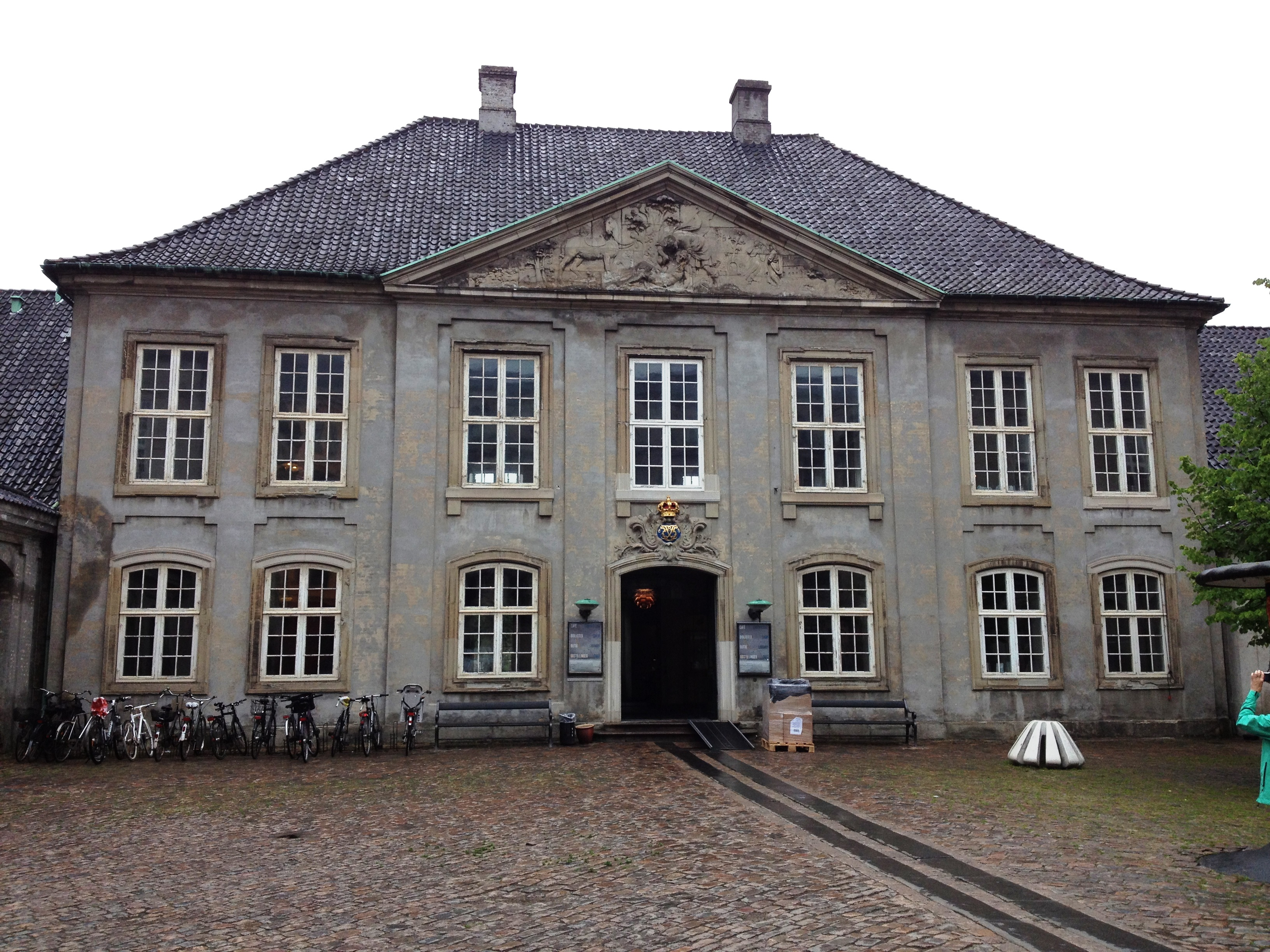
- The facade towards Bredgade
- Established: 1907
- Location: 68 Bredgade; Copenhagen, Denmark
- Coordinates: 55°41′10.95″N 12°35′36.06″E
- Director: Anne-Louise Sommer
- Website: designmuseum.dk/en/

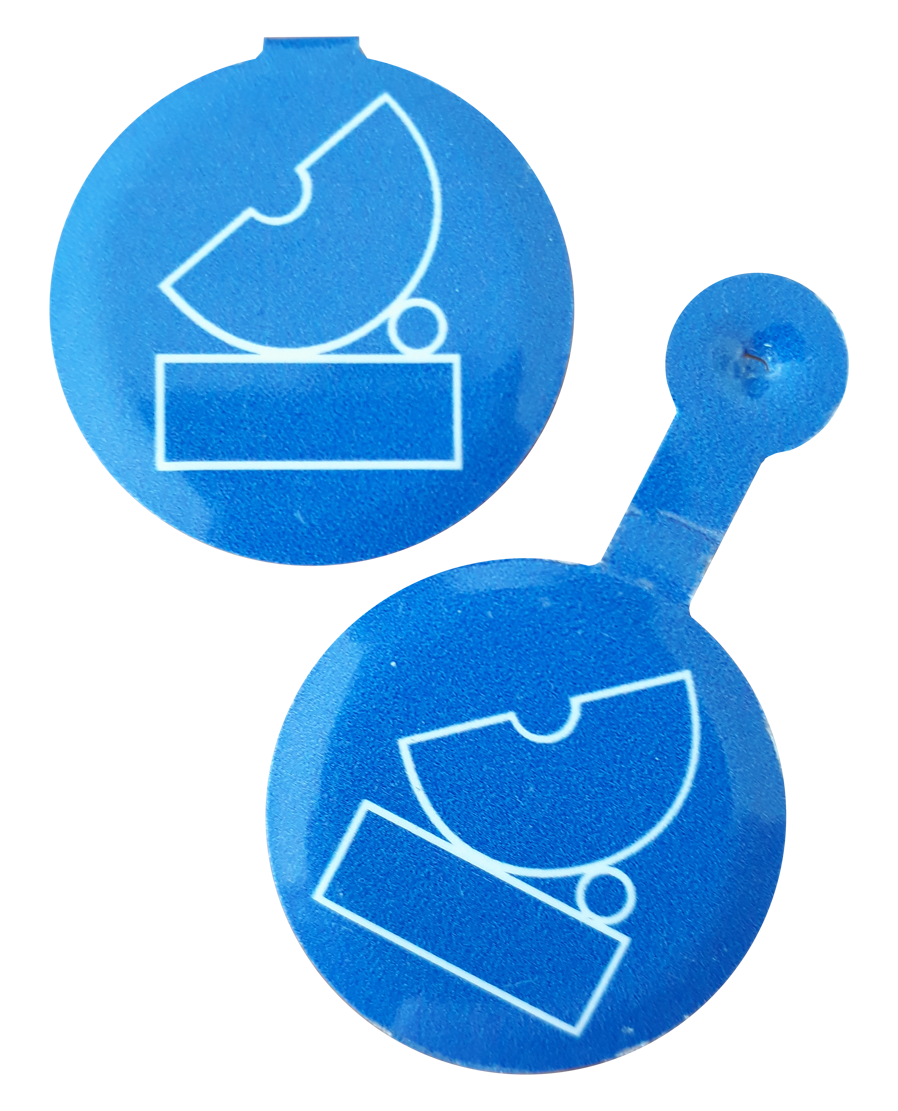
Ticket-pin

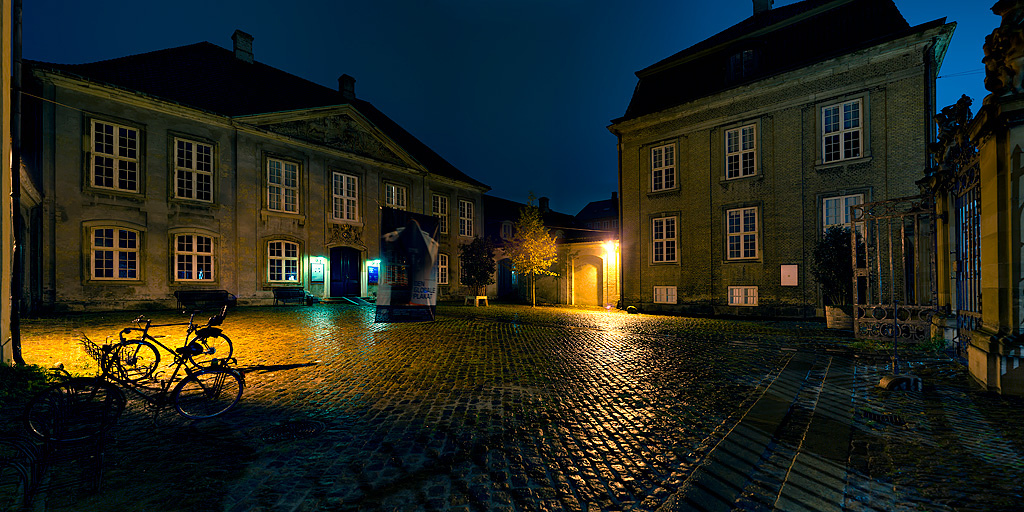
The courtyard in front of the museum by night

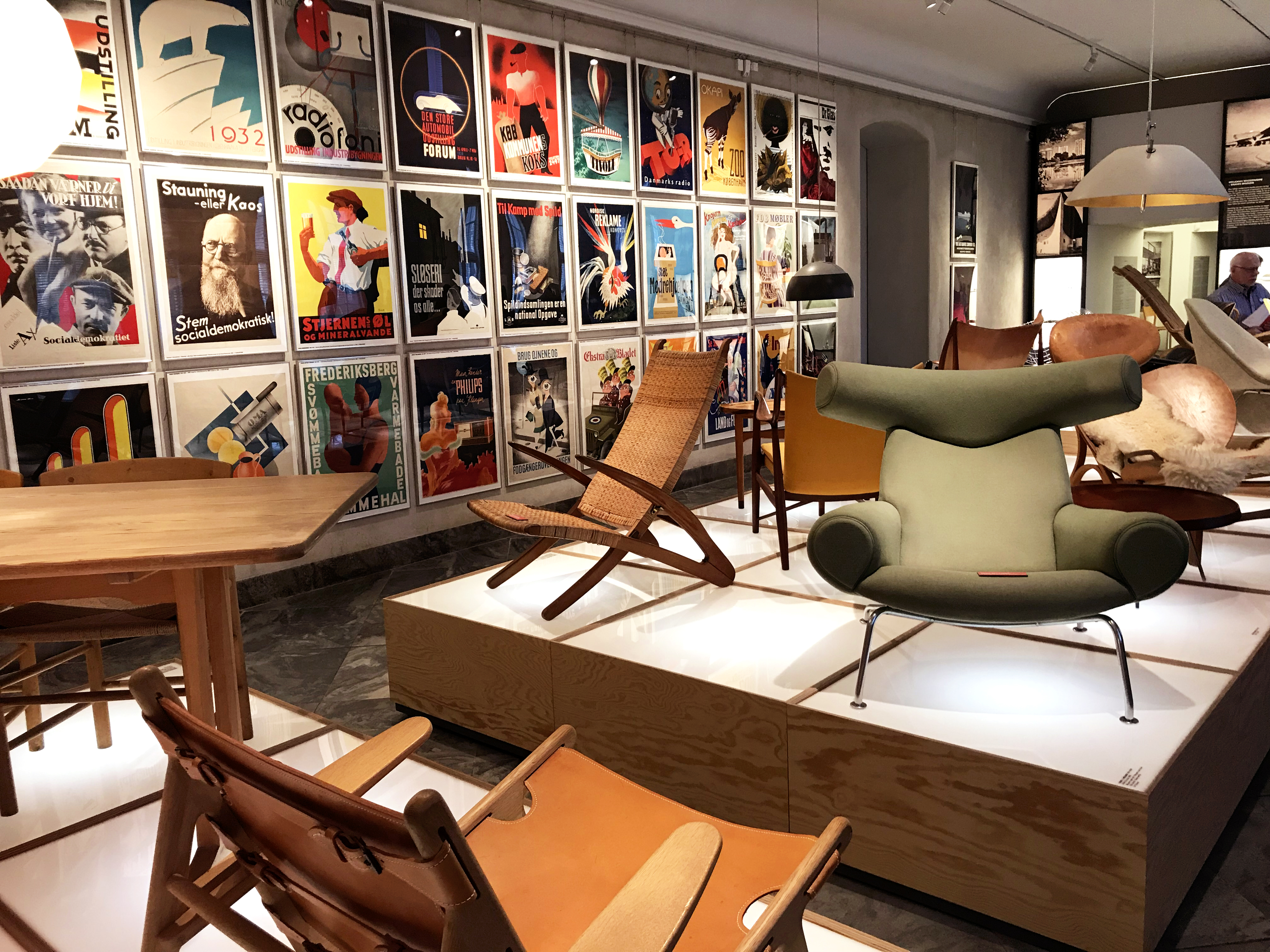
Danish Design Museum

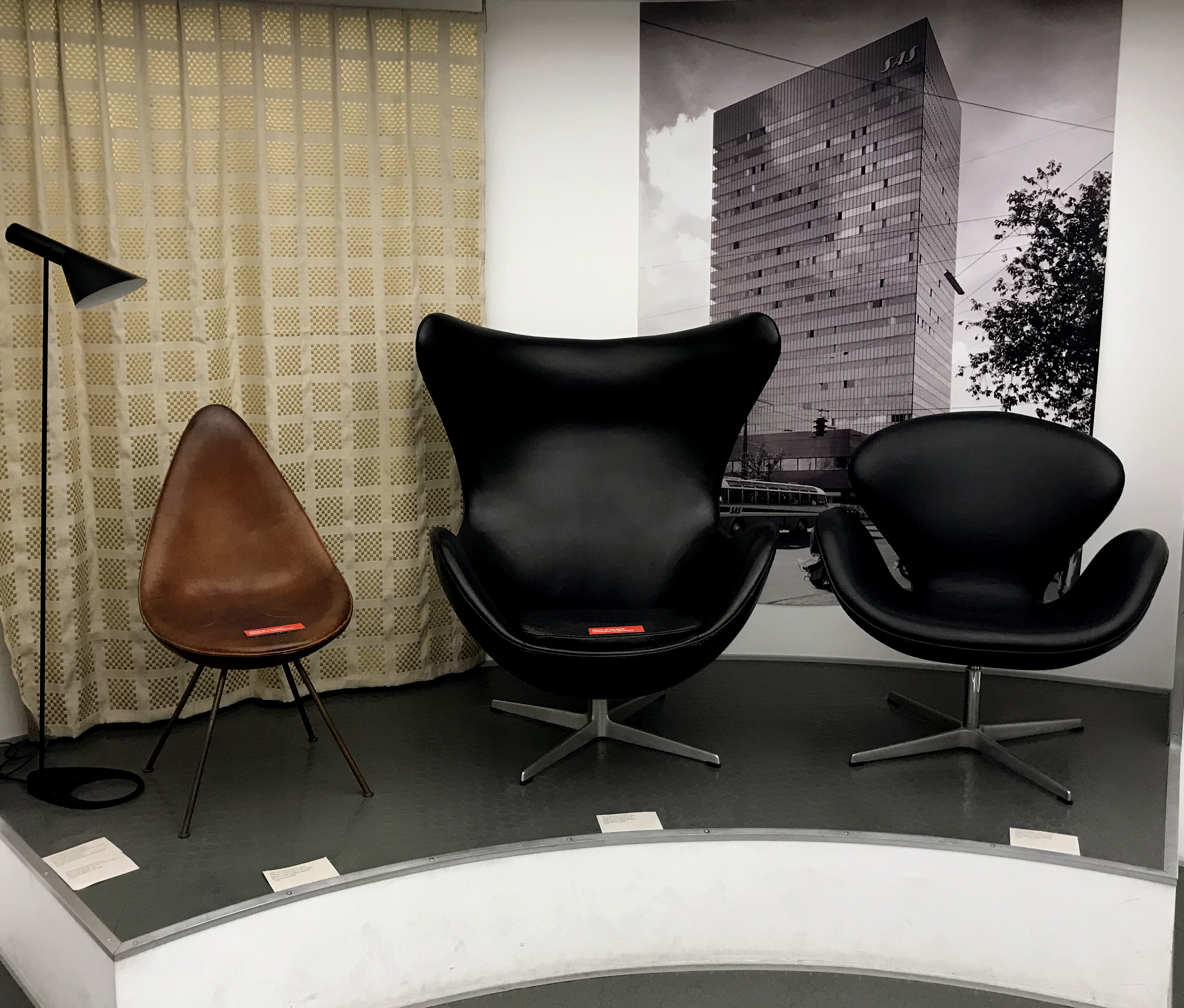
Famous chairs exhibition at Danish Design Museum.

The Designmuseum Denmark (Danish: Designmuseum Danmark) is a museum of Danish and international design and crafts located in Copenhagen. It features works of well known Danish designers including Arne Jacobsen, Jacob Jensen, and Kaare Klint, who was one of the two architects who remodelled the former Frederiks Hospital (built 1752–57) into a museum in the 1920s. The collection also features a variety of Chinese and German porcelain. The museum was known as the Danish Museum of Art & Design (Danish: Kunstindustrimuseet) until 2011, prior to which it was known as the Danish Museum of Decorative Art.

== History ==
The museum was founded in 1890 at the initiative of, among others, Industriforeningen. A purpose-built building designed by Vilhelm Klein and located next to Industriforeningen's premises on City Hall Square was completed in 1894 and opened to the public the following year. The exhibitions were housed in separate galleries, each dedicated to a particular field such as porcelain, faience, silver, furniture, glass and textiles. This arrangement reflected the primary aim of the museum which was to serve as a source of inspiration for craftspeople and manufacturers by highlighting the very best in build quality and design from different ages.

In 1926 the museum moved to its current building, the defunct Frederick's Hospital from 1757, a gift from the banker Emil Glückstadt. The architects Kaare Klint and Ivar Bentsen had undertaken the necessary alterations and furnishings.

== Library and archives ==
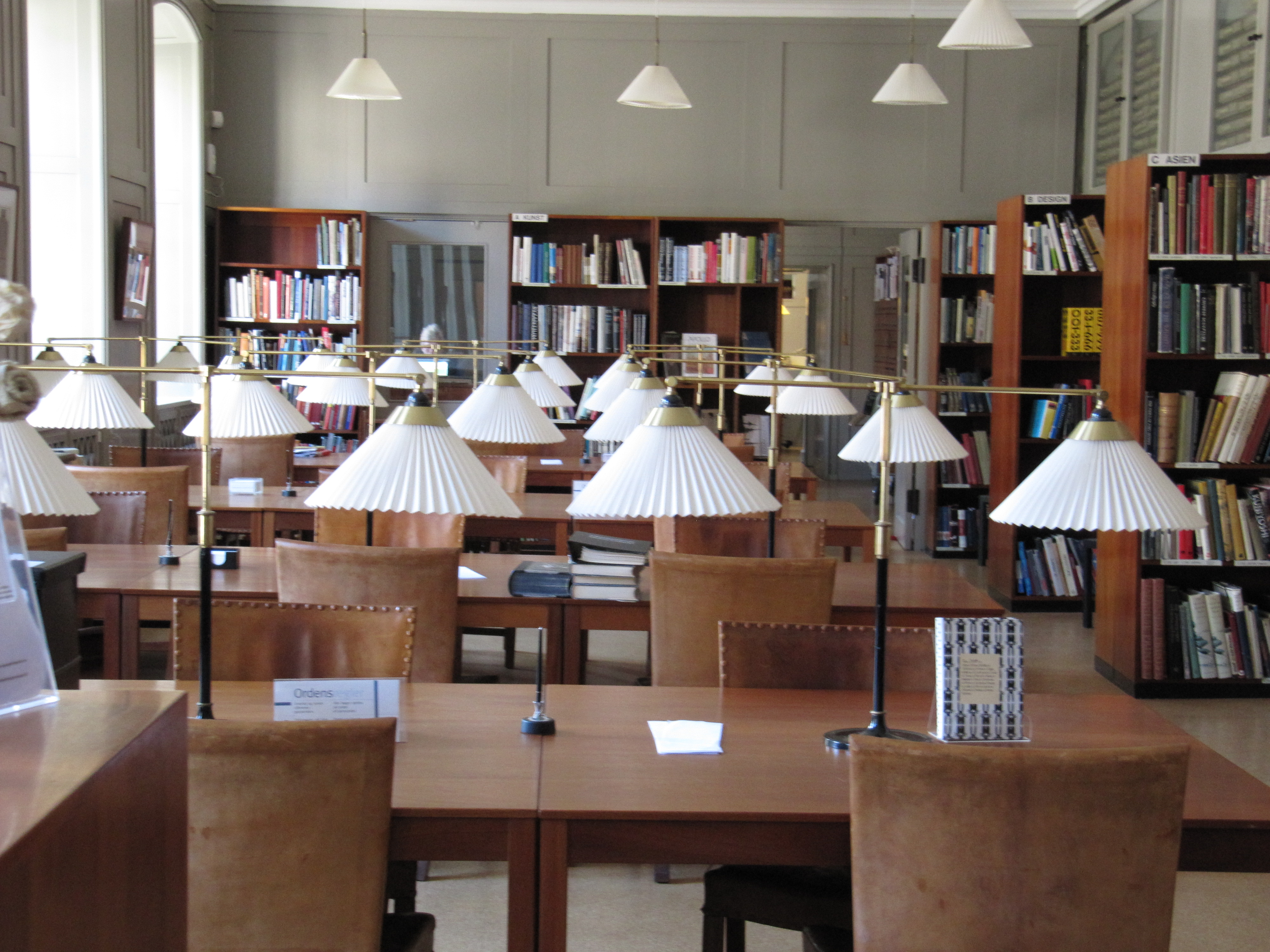
The Kaare Klint-designed reading room

The museum is home to the largest library in Scandinavia dedicated to decorative arts and industrial design. Open to the general public, the library is at once a museum library, research library, and Danish central library within its field. Opening hours are Tuesday–Friday from 11–17. The library contains more than 1,000 journals. The latest issues of the 75 journals and magazines which the museum subscribes to can be read in the library's reading room.

The reading room of the library hosts public lectures on design-related topics which draw upon the collections in both the museum and the library.

The Danish Design Archive and the Poster Collection are located on the museum's first floor.

== Furnitureindex ==
Designmuseum Denmark hosts the Furnitureindex, an online database of Danish furniture from the 20th and 21st centuries. The database is in English and contains over 12,000 records. The database was founded in 2000 by Marilyn and Reese Palley as the Palley Index Of Danish Furniture: 1900-2000. Designmuseum Denmark made the database publicly available online in 2003 after it was acquired by the Realdania Foundation.

== Auditorium ==
The museum has a small auditorium on the first floor seating 120 people. It is rented out for lectures, concerts, receptions and other events.

== Cultural references ==
In the first Olsen Gang film, Bredgade 68 is where the Olsen Gang steals the golden statue.

== See also ==
- List of design museums
- List of museums in Denmark
- Danish design
- Danish Design Centre
- Danish modern
- David Collection
