= List of Danish architects =

Following is a list of notable architects from Denmark.

== A ==
- Lauritz Petersen Aakjær (1883–1959)
- Charles Abrahams (1838–1893)
- Eggert Achen (1853–1913)
- Vilhelm Ahlmann (1852–1928)
- Merete Ahnfeldt-Mollerup (born 1963)
- Svend Albinus (1901–1995)
- Gregers Algreen-Ussing (born 1938)
- Cornelis Altenau (died 1558)
- Hans Christian Amberg (1837–1919)
- Cornelis Altenau (died 1558)
- Einar Ambt (1877–1928)
- Carl Thorvald Andersen (1835–1916)
- Carl Andersen (1879–1967)
- Einar Andersen (1881–1957)
- Hans Carl Andersen (1871–1941)
- Ib Andersen (born 1954)
- John Andersen (born 1943)
- Ludvig Andersen (1861–1927)
- Marinus Andersen (1895–1985)
- Rigmor Andersen (1903–1995)
- Thorvald Andersen (1883–1935)
- Stig Lennart Andersson (born 1957)
- Hans von Andorf (1570–1600)
- Georg David Anthon (1714–1781)
- Fredrik Appel (1884–1962)
- Thomas Arboe (1837–1917)
- Philip Arctander (1916–1994)
- Jens Thomas Arnfred (born 1947)
- Christian Arntzen (1852–1911)
- Niels Arp-Nielsen (1887–1970)
- Erik Asmussen (1913–1998)
- Feodor Asmussen (1887–1961)
- Svend Axelsson (born 1937)

== B ==
- Domenicus Badiaz (flourished 1607)
- Julius Bagger (1856–1934)
- Jacob Eiler Bang (1899–1965)
- Niels Banner Mathiesen (1696–1771)
- Jean-Jacques Baruël (1923–2010)
- Nicolai Basse (flourished 1738–42)
- Nicolaus Sigismund Bauer (1720–1777)
- Povl Baumann (1878–1963)
- Thor Beenfeldt (1878–1954)
- Kristian von Bengtson (born 1974)
- Andreas Bentsen (1839–1914)
- Ivar Bentsen (1876–1943)
- Axel Berg (1856–1926)
- Richard Bergmann (1919–1970)
- Jens Bertelsen (born 1952)
- Hans Dahlerup Berthelsen (1881–1939)
- Mathias Bidstrup (1852–1929)
- Curt Bie (1896–1989)
- Michael Gottlieb Bindesbøll (1800–1856)
- Thorvald Bindesbøll (1846–1908)
- Valdemar Birkmand (1873–1930)
- Holger Bisgaard (born 1952)
- Claus Bjarrum (born 1947)
- Theo Bjerg (1936-2019)
- Acton Bjørn (1910–1992)
- Knud Blach Petersen (1919–2008)
- Mogens Black-Petersen (1917–1999)
- Leonhard Blasius (died 1644)
- Jacob Blegvad (1921–2010)
- Emil Blichfeldt (1849–1908)
- Andreas Blinkenberg
- Kay Boeck-Hansen (1920–1992)
- Christian August Bohlsmann (c. 1740–1794)
- Helge Bojsen-Møller (1874–1946)
- Ove Boldt (1905–1969)
- Ole Ejnar Bonding (1910–1989)
- Caspar Leuning Borch (1853–1910)
- Christen Borch (1883–1972)
- Martin Borch (1852–1907)
- Gehrdt Bornebusch (1925–2011)
- Knud Borring (1838–1915)
- Ole Boye (1856–1907)
- Ellen Braae (born 1965)
- Jean Brahe (1951-2016)
- Johan Henrich Brandemann (1736–1803)
- Ernst Brandenburger (1689–c. 1713)
- Philip Brandin (1562–1594)
- Christian Brandstrup (1859–1937)
- Alfred Brandt (1873–1937)
- Gudmund Nyeland Brandt (1878–1945)
- Peter Bredsdorff (1913–1981)
- David Bretton-Meyer (1937–2015)
- Mogens Breyen (1932–2003)
- Henrik Vilhelm Brinkopff (1823–1900)
- Carl Brummer (1864–1953)
- Max Brüel (1927–1995)
- Cosmus Bræstrup (1877–1944)
- Aage Bugge (1874–1949)
- Ole Buhl (1912–1987)
- Axel Bundsen (1768–1832)
- Andreas Burmeister (1782–1815)
- Ernst Burmeister (1774–1806)
- Jørgen Buschardt (1923–2005)
- Martin Bussert (died c. 1552)
- Peter Christian Bønecke (1841–1914)
- Frederik Bøttger (1838–1920)

== C ==
- Antoine de Bosc de la Calmette (1752–1803)
- Charles Christensen (1886–1959)
- Hans Ove Christensen (1886–1971)
- Niels Christian Christensen (1867–1939)
- Sigurd Christensen (1888–1972)
- Per Christiansen (1919–2002)
- Christian Hjerrild Clausen (1866–1941)
- Jens Christian Clausen (1835–1886)
- Ludvig Clausen (1851–1904)
- Rudolf Frimodt Clausen (1861–1950)
- Andreas Clemmensen (1852–1928)
- Karen og Ebbe Clemmensen (1917–2001) (1917–2003)
- Mogens Clemmensen (1885–1943)
- Alf Cock-Clausen (1986–1983)
- Bo Cock-Clausen (1920–2012)
- Birgit Cold (born 1936)
- August Colding (1874–1941)
- Johan Christian Conradi (1709–1779)

== D ==
- Vilhelm Dahlerup (1826–1907)
- Andreas Dall (1886–1959)
- Hans Dall (1937–2009)
- Johan Jacob Deuntzer (1808–1875)
- John Dich (1865–1947)
- Hans von Diskow (1541–1563)
- Hans Dissing (1926–1998)
- Marten van Dochum (c. 1705–1769)
- Viggo Dorph-Petersen (1851–1937)
- Cay Dose (1702–1768)
- Frederik Draiby (1877–1966)
- Harald Drewsen (1836–1878)
- Thorvald Dreyer (1895–1980)
- Ejnar Dyggve (1887–1961)
- Palle Dyreborg (born 1938)

== E ==
- Jens Eckersberg (1822–1891)
- Gert Edstrand (born 1929)
- Nicolai Eigtved (1701–1754)
- Axel Ekberg (1882–1935)
- Knud V. Engelhardt (1882–1931)
- Johan Conrad Ernst (1666–1750)
- Troels Erstad (1911–1949)
- Erik Erstad-Jørgensen (1871–1945)
- Hector Estrup (1854–1904)
- Marco Evaristti (born 1963)
- Inger and Johannes Exner (born 1926) (1926–2015)

== F ==
- Tobias Faber (1915–2010)
- Jørn Fabricius (1936–2023)
- Joachim Fagerlund (1859–1933)
- Ole Falkentorp (1886–1948)
- Jean Fehmerling (1912–1978)
- Joseph Carl Julien de Feignet (1698–1771)
- Sven Felding (1944)
- Axel Feldinger (1893–1967)
- Ludvig Fenger (1833–1905)
- Dan Fink (1908–1998)
- Jep Fink (1882–1973)
- Arne Finsen (1890–1945)
- Helge Finsen (1897–1976)
- Egil Fischer (1878–1963)
- Vilhelm Fischer (1868–1914)
- Kay Fisker (1893–1965)
- Emanuel Christel Fleischer (1850–1911)
- Christian Flindt (born 1972)
- Jacob Fortling (1711–1761)
- Svend Fournais (1907–1984)
- Georg Juul Frankel (1893–1955)
- Otto Frankild (born 1918)
- Anton Frederiksen (1884–1967)
- Erik Ellegaard Frederiksen (1924–1997)
- Johannes Frederiksen (1881–1960)
- Vilhelm Friederichsen (1841–1913)
- Frederik Ferdinand Friis (1793–1865)
- Knud Friis (1926–2010)
- Jacob Wilhelm Frohne (1832–1909)
- Ove Funch-Espersen (1883–1964)
- Andreas Fussing (1871–1958)
- Christian Fussing (1852–1907)
- Christian Fussing (1878–1930)
- Hans Fussing (1838–1914)

== G ==
- Arne Gaardmand (1926–2008)
- Harald Gad (1884–1940)
- Frode Galatius (1890–1977)
- Harald Garde (1861–1933)
- Hans Christopher Gedde (1738–1817)
- Samuel Christoph Gedde (1691–1766)
- Jan Gehl (born 1936)
- Albert Gjellerup (1845–1935)
- Carl Ludvig Gjellerup (1796–1876)
- Carl Oluf Gjerløv-Knudsen (1892–1980)
- Carl Einar Glahn (1884–1971)
- Henrik Christopher Glahn (1850–1931)
- Otto Glahn (1813–1879)
- Edvard Glæsel (1858–1915)
- Henri Glæsel (1853–1921)
- Johannes Emil Gnudtzmann (1837–1922)
- Kristen Gording (1880–1950)
- Niels Gotenborg (1878–1964)
- Kaj Gottlob (1887–1976)
- Olaus Gram (1779–1827)
- Peter Andreas Rosenkilde Gram (1883–1968)
- Peder Gram (1885–1937)
- Sophus Greiffenberg (1876–1940)
- Vilhelm Groth-Hansen (1898–1967)
- Ragna Grubb (1903–1961)
- Flemming Grut (1911–1987)
- Torben Grut (1871–1945)
- Ejner Graae (1914–1989)
- Lorentz Poul Gudme (1861–1934)
- Joseph Guione (1746–1808)
- Thorvald Gundestrup (1869–1931)
- Oscar Gundlach-Pedersen (1886–1960)
- Niels Peter Pedersen Gundstrup (1877–1949)
- Halldor Gunnløgsson (1918–1985)
- Nicolai Gyntelberg (1626–1661)

== H ==
- Henrik Hagemann (1845–1910)
- Peter Heinrich Christoph Hagemann (1810–1853)
- Gustav Bartholin Hagen (1873–1941)
- Ole Hagen (1913–1984)
- Andreas Hagerup (1856–1919)
- Andreas Hallander (1755–1828)
- Valdemar Hansen Hammer (1866–1943)
- Christian Frederik Hansen (1756–1845)
- Christian Hansen (1803–1883)
- Claudius Hansen (b. 1888–?)
- Frederik Carl Christian Hansen (1858–1923)
- Hans Hansen (1899–1958)
- Hans Christian Hansen (1901–1978)
- Hans Henning Hansen (1916–1985)
- Hans Munk Hansen (1929–2021)
- Heinrich Hansen (1860–1942)
- Henning Hansen (1880–1945)
- Isaak Hansen (1788–1852)
- Matthias Hansen (1781–1850)
- Nicolai Hansen (1870–1899)
- Preben Hansen (1908–1989)
- Theophilus Hansen (1813–1891)
- Carl Harild (1868–1932)
- Christoffer Harlang (born 1958)
- Caspar Frederik Harsdorff (1735–1799)
- Philip Hartmann (1710–1779)
- Jørgen Hartmann-Petersen (1920–2012)
- Eigil Hartvig Rasmussen (1905–1980)
- Harald Hauberg (1883–1956)
- Niels Hauberg (1885–1952)
- Hans Andreas Wilhelm Haugsted (1832–1912)
- Anton Haunstrup (1862–1926)
- Elias David Häusser (1687–1745)
- Malene Hauxner (1942–2012)
- Lambert van Haven (1630–1695)
- Thomas Havning (1891–1976)
- Alan Havsteen-Mikkelsen (1938–2002)
- Edvard Heiberg (1911–2000)
- Henning Helger (1912–1989)
- Bent Helweg-Møller (1883–1956)
- Poul Henningsen (1894–1967)
- Simon P. Henningsen (1920–1974)
- Thorkild Henningsen (1884–1931)
- Michael Johan Herbst (1699–1762)
- Johan Daniel Herholdt (1818–1902)
- Gustav Friedrich Hetsch (1788–1864)
- Therkel Hjejle (1884–1927)
- Elliot Hjuler (1893–1968)
- Johann Gottfried Hödrich (baptized 1697–c. 1745)
- Povl Ernst Hoff (1903–1992)
- Gottfried Hoffmann (1630–1687)
- Vilhelm Holck (1856–1936)
- Georg Holgreen (1795–1843)
- Hans Jørgen Holm (1835–1916)
- Mads Schifter Holm (1800–1874)
- Knud Holscher (born 1930)
- Niels Peder Christian Holsøe (1826–1895)
- Poul Holsøe (1873–1966)
- Christian Bernhard Hornbech (1772–1855)
- Ove Hove (1914–1993)
- Gunnar Hoydal (1941–2021)
- Vilhelm Hvalsøe (1883–1958)
- Tyge Hvass (1885–1963)
- Peter Hvidt (1916–1986)
- Louis Hygom (1879–1950)
- Axel Høeg-Hansen (1877–1947)

== I ==
- Anna Maria Indrio (born 1943)
- Bjarke Ingels (born 1974)
- Bernhard Ingemann (1789–1862)
- Poul Ingemann (born 1952)
- Valdemar Ingemann (1840–1911)
- Jens Ingwersen (1871–1956)
- Mogens Irming (1915–1993)
- Kristian Isager (born 1946)

== J ==
- Arne Jacobsen (1902–1971)
- Holger Jacobsen (1876–1960)
- Lorentz Jacobsen (1721–1779)
- Mogens Jacobsen (1911–1970)
- Niels Jacobsen (1865–1935)
- Ewert Janssen (died 1692)
- Nicolas-Henri Jardin (1720–1799)
- Peder Vilhelm Jensen-Klint (1853–1930)
- Albert Jensen (1847–1913)
- Ferdinand Vilhelm Jensen (1837–1890)
- Ib Martin Jensen (1906–1979)
- Jens Jensen (1860–1951)
- Louis Jensen (1943–2021)
- Peder Boas Jensen (1935–2024)
- Rasmus Jensen (1863–1924)
- Emil Jeppesen (1851–1934)
- Louis Jeppesen (1876–1944)
- Carsten Juel-Christiansen (1944–2019)
- Boye Junge (1697–1778)
- Johan Boye Junge (1735–1807)
- Helle Juul (born 1954)
- Alf Jørgensen (1878–1923)
- da:Emil Jørgensen (1858–1942)
- Eugen Jørgensen (1858–1910)
- Frode Jørgensen (1903–1988)
- Henning Jørgensen (1883–1973)
- Thorvald Jørgensen (1867–1946)
- Waldemar Jørgensen (1883–1955)

== K ==
- Andreas Dobert Kalleberg (1772–1827)
- Christian Kampmann (1890–1955)
- Hack Kampmann (1856–1920)
- Hack Kampmann (1913–2005)
- Hans Jørgen Kampmann (1889–1966)
- Otto Käszner (1938–2019)
- Andreas Kirkerup (1749–1810)
- Frederik Kiørboe (1878–1952)
- Marius Kjeldsen (1924–2004)
- Hjalmar Kjær (1872–1933)
- Werner Kjær (1924–1998)
- August Klein (1870–1913)
- Viggo Klein (1850–1913)
- Vilhelm Klein (1835–1913)
- Kaare Klint (1888–1954)
- Naur Klint (1920–1978)
- Jens Klok (1889–1974)
- Kenneth Knudsen (born 1946)
- Ludvig Knudsen (1843–1924)
- Sylvius Knutzen (1870–1939)
- Fritz Koch (1857–1905)
- Hans Koch (1893–1945)
- Jørgen Hansen Koch (1787–1860)
- Mogens Koch (1898–1992)
- Peter Koch (1905–1980)
- Valdemar Koch (1852–1902)
- Jens Christian Kofoed (1864–1941)
- Eva og Nils Koppel (1916–2006) (1914–2009)
- Peter Kornerup (1794–1875)
- Ole Kornerup-Bang (1917–2000)
- Erik Korshagen (1926–2005)
- Johan Cornelius Krieger (1683–1755)
- Svenn Eske Kristensen (1905–2000)
- Arnold Krog (1856–1931)
- Gunnar Krohn (1914–2005)
- Anders Kruuse (1745–1811)
- Ernst Kühn (1890–1948)
- Sophus Frederik Kühnel (1851–1930)

== L ==
- Osvald Rosendahl Langballe (1859–1930)
- Carl Lange (1828–1900)
- Philip Lange (1756–1805)
- Philip de Lange (1705–1766)
- Aage Langeland-Mathiesen (1868–1933)
- Hans Erling Langkilde (1906–1997)
- Christen Larsen (1857–1930)
- Henning Larsen (1925–2013)
- Karl Larsen (1892–1958)
- Flemming Lassen (1902–1984)
- Mogens Lassen (1901–1987)
- Aage Sigurd Kjeldgaard Lauritzen (1871–1961)
- Vilhelm Lauritzen (1894–1984)
- Jens Laustsen (1890–?)
- David Wilhelm Leerbeck (1855–1904)
- Alfred Oscar Leffland (1848–1924)
- Søren Lemche (1864–1955)
- Carl Lendorf (1839–1918)
- Vincents Lerche (1666–1742)
- Frederik Lauritz Levy (1851–1924)
- Joseph Christian Lillie (1760–1827)
- Jens Lindhe (born 1958)
- Hans von Linstow (1787–1851)
- Ernst Lohse (1944–1994)
- Jean Baptiste Descarriéres de Longueville (1699–1766)
- Knud Andersen Ludvigsen (1866–?)
- Annemarie Lund (born 1948)
- Frederik Christian Lund (1896–1984)
- Lene Dammand Lund (born 1963)
- Søren Robert Lund (1962)
- Ib Lunding (1895–1983)
- Carl Lundquist (1891–1916)
- Tage Lyneborg (1946-2020)
- Curt von Lüttichau (1897–1991)
- Charles Æmilius von Lützow (1683–1749)
- Gunnar Laage (1876–1948)
- Julius Bentley Løffler (1843–1904)
- Harald Lønborg-Jensen (1871–1948)
- Aage Lønborg-Jensen (1877–1938)

== M ==
- Einar Madvig (1882–1952)
- Boye Magens (1748–1814)
- Peder Malling (1865–1952)
- Dorte Mandrup (born 1961)
- Christian Mandrup-Poulsen (1865–1952)
- Ove Mandrup-Poulsen (1899–1984)
- Poul Mangor (1918–2007)
- Johan Ludvig Mansa (1740–1820)
- Sophus Marstrand (1860–1946)
- Vilhelm Marstrand (1810–1873)
- Kent Martinussen (born 1960)
- Albertus Mathiesen (1660-1668)
- Pia Bech Mathiesen (1962-2016)
- Paul Staffeldt Matthiesen (1891–1979)
- Ferdinand Meldahl (1827–1908)
- Heinrich Meldahl (1776–1840)
- Grethe Meyer (1918–2008)
- Sonja Meyer (1898–1981)
- Peter Meyn (1749–1808)
- Knud Millech (1890–1980)
- Ejnar Mindedal (1892–1975)
- Alfred Mogensen (1900–1986)
- Tyge Mollerup (1888–1953)
- Ole Peter Momme (1854–1899)
- Emanuel Monberg (1877–1938)
- Niels Christensen Monberg (1856–1930)
- Johann Hermann von Motz (1743–1829)
- Knud Munk (1936-2016)
- Otto Johann Müller (1692–1762)
- Axel Maar (1888–1978)
- Orla Mølgaard-Nielsen (1907–1993)
- Axel Møller (1862–1943)
- C. F. Møller (1898–1988)
- Elna Møller (1913–1994)
- Erik Møller (1909–2002)
- Georg Ebbe Wineken Møller (1840–1897)
- Thorkel Møller (1868–1946)
- Viggo Sten Møller (1897–1990)
- Jens Møller-Jensen (1869–1948)
- Viggo Møller-Jensen (1907–2003)
- Ejvind Mørch (1873–1962)
- Volmer Johannes Mørk-Hansen (1856–1929)
- Christian Jensen Mørup (1732–1800)

== N ==
- Børge Nagel (1921–2004)
- Johan Henrik Nebelong (1817–1871)
- Niels Sigfred Nebelong (1806–1871)
- Skjold Neckelmann (1854–1903)
- August J. Nielsen (1890–1960)
- Christian Vilhelm Nielsen (1833–1910)
- Christian Frühstück Nielsen (1878–1956)
- Hans Peter Svendler Nielsen (born 1954)
- Jens Nielsen (1937–1992)
- Johan Nielsen (1863–1952)
- Johannes Magdahl Nielsen (1862–1941)
- Kim Herforth Nielsen (born 1954)
- Peter Nielsen (1886–1969)
- Viggo Berner Nielsen (1889–1966)
- Viggo Norn (1879–1967)
- Einar Johannes Norup (1875–1951)
- Cajus Novi (1878–1965)
- Victor Nyebølle (1862–1933)
- Stephan Peter Nyeland (1845–1922)
- Martin Nyrop (1849–1921)
- Hans Næss (1723–1795)

== O ==
- Anthonis van Obbergen (1543–1611)
- Hercules von Oberberg (1517–1602)
- C.E.D. von Oetken (c. 1691–1754)
- Tage Olivarius (1847–1905)
- Christian Olrik (1881–1944)
- Johannes Martin Olsen (1881–1959)
- Albert Oppenheim (1879–1956)
- Einar Ørnsholt (1887–1978)
- Henning Ortmann (1901–1976)

== P ==
- Einar Packness (1879–1952)
- Georg Palludan (1889–1964)
- Hother A. Paludan (1871–1956)
- Johannes Paludan (1912–2001)
- Marius Pedersen (1888–1965)
- Domenico Pelli (1657–1728)
- Jørgen Pers (1933–2021)
- Aksel Petersen (1897–1953)
- Carl Petersen (1874–1923)
- Ernst Petersen (1883–1953)
- Gunnar Biilmann Petersen (1897–1968)
- Harald Petersen (1890–1954)
- Jens Vilhelm Petersen (1851–1931)
- Knud Arne Petersen (1862–1943)
- Knud Lehn Petersen (1890–1974)
- Ludvig Petersen (1848–1935)
- Ove Petersen (1830–1892)
- Vilhelm Petersen (1830–1913)
- Olaf Petri (1875–1946)
- Ernst Peymann (1737–1823)
- Georg Pfaff (1886–1954)
- Christian Carl Pflueg (1728–1809)
- Andreas Pfützner (1741–1793)
- Johan Andreas Pfützner (1708–1764)
- Holger Pind (1899–1988)
- Wilhelm Friedrich von Platen (1667–1732)
- Bent von Platen-Hallermund (1922–2013)
- Ulrik Plesner (1861–1933)
- Ulrik Adolph Plesner (1861–1933)
- Camilla Plum (born 1956)
- Harald Plum (1881–1929)
- Georg Ponsaing (1889–1981)
- Gerhardt Poulsen (1883–1918)
- Axel Preisler (1871–1930)
- Alexis J. Prior (1877–1955)
- Vilhelm Puck (1844–1926)
- Vilhelm Puck (1882–1954)
- Hans van Paeschen (1561–1582)

== Q ==
- Johan Martin Quist (1755–1818)

== R ==
- Aage Rafn (1890–1953)
- Hans Rahlff (1897–1975)
- Børge Rammeskow (1911–2009)
- Svend Ramsby (1902–1976)
- Carl Ferdinand Rasmussen (1831–1903)
- Holger Rasmussen (1871–1952)
- Ib og Jørgen Rasmussen (1931-2017)
- Poul C. Rasmussen (1885–1965)
- Steen Eiler Rasmussen (1898–1990)
- Alfred Råvad (1848–1933)
- Jørgen Henrich Rawert (1751–1823)
- Johan Richter (1925–1998)
- Nicolaus Hinrich Rieman (died 1759)
- Sven Risom (1880–1971)
- Gerhard Rønne (1879–1955)
- Anton Rosen (1859–1928)
- Georg Erdman Rosenberg (1739–1788)
- Johann Gottfried Rosenberg (1709–1776)
- Niels Rosenkjær (1886–1928)
- Einar Rosenstand (1887–1953)
- Rudolph Rothe (1802–1877)
- Aage Roussell (1901–1972)
- Rasmus Rue (1863–1944)
- Henrik Rysensteen (1624–1679)
- Hans Rustad (1759–1832)

== S ==
- Harald Salling-Mortensen (1902–1969)
- Valdemar Sander (1876–1975)
- Hans Scheving (born 1958)
- Erik Schiødte (1849–1909)
- Carl Schiøtz (1877–1938) (1877–1938)
- Frits Schlegel (1896–1965)
- Ole Jørgen Schmidt (1793–1848)
- Valdemar Schmidt (1864–1944)
- Olaf Schmidth (1857–1927)
- Charles I. Schou (1884–1973)
- Rolf Schroeder (1872–1948)
- Hans Wilhelm Schrøder (1810–1888)
- Johan Schrøder (1836–1914)
- Kay Schrøder (1877–1949)
- Emil Schwanenflügel (1847–1921)
- Ib Schwanenflügel (Flourished 1960)
- Christian Seemann (1840–1920)
- Knud Tanggaard Seest (1879–1972)
- Bernhard Seidelin (1820–1863)
- Conrad Seidelin (1809–1878)
- Jørgen Selchau (1923–1997)
- Bent Severin (1925–2012)
- Henrik Steffens Sibbern (1826–1901)
- Svend Sinding (1881–1929)
- Alfred Skjøt-Pedersen (1897–1979)
- Hans Georg Skovgaard (1898–1969)
- Poul Erik Skriver (1918-2016)
- Morten Skøt (1886–1937)
- Carl Martin Smidt (1872–1947)
- Philip Smidth (1855–1938)
- Julius Smith (1861–1943)
- Johann Adam Soherr (1706–1778)
- Carl Theodor Sørensen (1893–1979)
- Erik Christian Sørensen (1922–2011)
- Holger Sørensen (1913–1981)
- Theodor Sørensen (1825–1867)
- Thorvald Sørensen (1902–1973)
- Johan Otto von Spreckelsen (1929–1987)
- Claus Stallknecht (1681–1734)
- Hans van Steenwinckel the Elder (1550–1601)
- Hans van Steenwinckel the Younger (1587–1639)
- Hans van Steenwinckel the Youngest (1639–1700)
- Povl Stegmann (1888–1944)
- Hakon Stephensen (1900–1986)
- Jon Stephensen (born 1959)
- Harald Conrad Stilling (1815–1891)
- Willads Stilling (1752–1831)
- J.A. Stillmann (1822–1875)
- Hermann Baagøe Storck (1839–1922)
- Dan Stubbergaard (born 1974)
- Theodor Stuckenberg (1835–1901)
- Jørgen Stærmose (1920–2007)
- Palle Suenson (1904–1987)
- Christian Sylow (1866–1930)

== T ==
- Johannes Strøm Tejsen (1878–1950)
- Hans-Georg Tersling (1857–1920)
- Leopold Teschl (1911–1989)
- Andreas Thejll (1852–1908)
- Ferdinand Thielemann (1803–1863)
- T.A. Thierry (1873–1953)
- Lars Juel Thiis (1955–2005)
- Julius Tholle (1831–1871)
- Alfred Thomsen (1853–1934)
- C.F. Thomsen (1855–1926)
- Edvard Thomsen (1884–1980)
- Carl Thonning (1855–1926)
- Christian Frederik Thorin (1801–1829)
- William August Thulstrup (1820–1898)
- Laurids de Thurah (1706–1759)
- Christian L. Thuren (1846–1926)
- Ejnar Thuren (1877–1936)
- Christian Tyge Tillisch (1903–1992)
- Holger Tornøe (1881–1967)
- Lene Tranberg (born 1956)
- Ibi Trier Mørch (1910–1980)
- Niels Frithiof Truelsen (born 1938)
- Georg Tschierske (1699–1753)
- Georg Dietrich Tschierske (Flourished 1749–1780)
- Kai Turin (1885–1935)
- Marcus Tuscher (1705–1751)
- Gotfred Tvede (1863–1947)
- Jesper Tvede (1879–1934)
- Vilhelm Tvede (1826–1891)
- Christian Tybjerg (1815–1879)

== U ==
- Bertel Udsen (1918–1992)
- Frits Uldall (1839–1921)
- Rudolf Unmack (1834–1909)
- Kjeld Ussing (1913–1977)
- Susanne Ussing (1940–1998)
- Jørn Utzon (1918–2008)

== V ==
- Henrik Valeur (born 1966)
- Kristoffer Varming (1865–1936)
- Michael Varming (1939–2008)
- Søren Vig-Nielsen (1876–1964)
- Kjeld Vindum (born 1950)
- Mogens Voltelen (1908–1995)

== W ==
- Allan de Waal (1938–2012)
- Jens Peter Jensen Wærum (1855–1926)
- Arne Wagner Smitt (1910–1976)
- Frederik Wagner (1880–1946)
- Vilhelm Theodor Walther (1819–1892)
- Niels Wamberg (born 1938)
- Axel Wanscher (1902–1973)
- Ole Wanscher (1903–1985)
- Theodor Wedén (1848–1931)
- Robert Wehage (1900–?)
- Otto Weitling (1930–?)
- Heinrich Wenck (1851–1936)
- Carl Emil Wessel (1831–1867)
- Noah Danø Whitehorn (born 1975)
- Lone Wiggers (born 1963)
- Claudius August Wiinholt (1855–1905)
- Hans Wilhardt (1907–1985)
- Bennet Windinge (1905–1986)
- Laurits Albert Winstrup (1815–1889)
- Arthur Wittmaack (1878–1965)
- Georg Wittrock (1843–1911)
- Vilhelm Wohlert (1920–2007)
- Vilhelm Carl Heinrich Wolf (1833–1893)
- Henning Wolff (1828–1880)
- Carl Wolmar (1876–1957)
- Hans Wright (1854–1925)

== Z ==
- Hans Christian Zeltner (1826–1889)
- Otto F. Zeltner (1858–1923)
- Theodor Zeltner (1822–1904)
- Samuel Zimmermann (Flourished 1748–1757)
- Jens Giødvad Zinn (1836–1926)
- Christian Joseph Zuber (1736–1802)
- Joseph Zuber (1705–1771)
- Martin Zumpe (1697–1753)
- Christian Zwingmann (1827–1891)

== See also ==
- Architecture of Denmark
- Bibliography of Danish architecture
- List of architects
- List of Danish architectural firms
- List of Danes
