= Thorvald Andersen (disambiguation) =

Thorvald Andersen may refer to:

- Thorvald Andersen (1883–1935), Danish architect
- Carl Thorvald Andersen (1835–1916), Danish architect

== See also ==
- List of Danish architects
