= 2025 Hørsholm municipal election =

Municipal election in Denmark

- 18 November 2025

All 19 seats to the Hørsholm municipal council 10 seats needed for a majority
- Turnout: 15,215 (76.0%) ▲0.7%
| | First party | Second party | Third party |
|---|---|---|---|
| | C | V | I |
| Party | Conservatives | Venstre | Liberal Alliance |
| Last election | 7 seats, 36.9% | 7 seats, 26.5% | 0 seats, 3.2% |
| Seats won | 7 | 3 | 3 |
| Seat change | 0 | ▼4 | ▲3 |
| Popular vote | 4,988 | 2,635 | 2,044 |
| Percentage | 33.2% | 17.6% | 13.6% |
| Swing | ▼3.7% | ▼8.9% | ▲10.4% |
| | Fourth party | Fifth party | Sixth party |
| | B | A | E |
| Party | Social Liberals | Social Democrats | Listen Anne Ehrenreich |
| Last election | 1 seat, 6.0% | 2 seats, 11.3% | Did not stand |
| Seats won | 1 | 1 | 1 |
| Seat change | 0 | ▼1 | ▲1 |
| Popular vote | 1,180 | 1,128 | 778 |
| Percentage | 7.9% | 7.5% | 5.2% |
| Swing | ▲1.8% | ▼3.8% | New |
| | Seventh party | Eighth party | Ninth party |
| | T | F | Q |
| Party | Borgerlisten Hørsholm | Green Left | SocialKonservative |
| Last election | Did not stand | 1 seat, 4.2% | 1 seat, 5.8% |
| Seats won | 1 | 1 | 1 |
| Seat change | ▲1 | 0 | 0 |
| Popular vote | 724 | 715 | 635 |
| Percentage | 4.8% | 4.8% | 4.2% |
| Swing | New | ▲0.5% | ▼1.5% |
Mayor before election
Morten Slotved
Conservatives
Mayor after election
Morten Slotved
Conservatives

The 2025 Hørsholm Municipal election was held on November 18, 2025, to elect the 19 members to sit in the regional council for the Hørsholm Municipal council, in the period of 2026 to 2029. Morten Slotved from the Conservatives, would secure re-election.

== Background ==
Following the 2021 election, Morten Slotved from Conservatives became mayor for his fourth term. He would run for a fifth term. Former handball player Joachim Boldsen, would be a candidate for the Conservatives in the election, and was elected

== Electoral system ==
For elections to Danish municipalities, a number varying from 9 to 31 are chosen to be elected to the municipal council. The seats are then allocated using the D'Hondt method and a closed list proportional representation. Hørsholm Municipality had 19 seats in 2025.

== Electoral alliances ==
=== Electoral Alliance 1 ===
| Party | | Political alignment |
|---|---|---|
| A | Social Democrats | Centre-left |
| Q | SocialKonservative | Local politics |

=== Electoral Alliance 2 ===
| Party | | Political alignment |
|---|---|---|
| B | Social Liberals | Centre to Centre-left |
| F | Green Left | Centre-left to Left-wing |

=== Electoral Alliance 3 ===
| Party | | Political alignment |
|---|---|---|
| C | Conservatives | Centre-right |
| M | Moderates | Centre to Centre-right |

=== Electoral Alliance 4 ===
| Party | | Political alignment |
|---|---|---|
| E | Listen Anne Ehrenreich | Local politics |
| T | Borgerlisten Hørsholm | Local politics |

=== Electoral Alliance 5 ===
| Party | | Political alignment |
|---|---|---|
| I | Liberal Alliance | Centre-right to Right-wing |
| V | Venstre | Centre-right |

== Results by polling station ==
| Division | A | B | C | E | F | I | L | M | Q | T | V |
| Division | % | % | % | % | % | % | % | % | % | % | % |
|---|---|---|---|---|---|---|---|---|---|---|---|
| Hørsholm Skole | 8.3 | 7.1 | 34.1 | 4.8 | 5.5 | 11.3 | 0.1 | 1.1 | 5.3 | 4.7 | 17.7 |
| Usserød | 9.5 | 8.4 | 30.3 | 4.4 | 6.1 | 11.9 | 0.2 | 1.1 | 5.1 | 5.3 | 17.6 |
| Rungsted | 3.7 | 6.1 | 38.2 | 5.6 | 2.4 | 19.0 | 0.3 | 1.3 | 1.4 | 4.5 | 17.7 |
| Grønnegade | 5.6 | 13.9 | 28.3 | 5.2 | 4.0 | 19.1 | 0.0 | 1.6 | 2.8 | 3.2 | 16.3 |
| Vallerød | 7.6 | 8.9 | 32.0 | 6.0 | 4.6 | 13.3 | 0.2 | 0.7 | 4.5 | 4.9 | 17.3 |

== Results ==
| Party | | Votes | % | +/- | Seats | +/- |
Hørsholm Municipality
| C | Conservatives | 4,988 | 33.23 | -3.66 | 7 | 0 |
| V | Venstre | 2,635 | 17.55 | -8.93 | 3 | -4 |
| I | Liberal Alliance | 2,044 | 13.62 | +10.44 | 3 | +3 |
| B | Social Liberals | 1,180 | 7.86 | +1.82 | 1 | 0 |
| A | Social Democrats | 1,128 | 7.51 | -3.77 | 1 | -1 |
| E | Listen Anne Ehrenreich | 778 | 5.18 | New | 1 | New |
| T | Borgerlisten Hørsholm | 724 | 4.82 | New | 1 | New |
| F | Green Left | 715 | 4.76 | +0.51 | 1 | 0 |
| Q | SocialKonservative | 635 | 4.23 | -1.54 | 1 | 0 |
| M | Moderates | 157 | 1.05 | New | 0 | New |
| L | Ib Lunde's Liste | 27 | 0.18 | New | 0 | New |
| Total | | 15,011 | 100 | N/A | 19 | N/A |
| Invalid votes | | 64 | 0.32 | +0.16 | | |
| Blank votes | | 140 | 0.70 | +0.21 | | |
| Turnout | | 15,215 | 75.98 | +0.74 | | |
Source: valg.dk

== Opinion polls ==
| Polling firm | Fieldwork date | Sample size | C | V | A | B | Q | F | I | E | L | M | T | Others | Lead |
|---|---|---|---|---|---|---|---|---|---|---|---|---|---|---|---|
| Epinion | 4 Sep - 13 Oct 2025 | 526 | 34.7 | 16.0 | 9.1 | 3.6 | – | 7.3 | 20.4 | – | – | 1.7 | – | 7.1 | 14.3 |
| 2024 european parliament election | 9 Jun 2024 | | 17.7 | 22.7 | 8.5 | 8.3 | – | 9.2 | 14.3 | – | – | 9.6 | – | – | 5.0 |
| 2022 general election | 1 Nov 2022 | | 13.2 | 20.6 | 13.4 | 5.1 | – | 4.0 | 17.0 | – | – | 14.0 | – | – | 3.6 |
| 2021 regional election | 16 Nov 2021 | | 41.7 | 22.7 | 11.7 | 7.5 | – | 3.3 | 3.1 | – | – | – | – | – | 19.0 |
| 2021 municipal election | 16 Nov 2021 | | 36.9 (7) | 26.5 (7) | 11.3 (2) | 6.0 (1) | 5.8 (1) | 4.2 (1) | 3.2 (0) | – | – | – | – | – | 10.4 |
