= List of Danish architectural firms =

This is a list of architectural firms based in Denmark. For a list of individual Danish architects, see the list of Danish architects.

== List ==
=== Active ===
Company	Location	Founded	Principal architect
3XN	Copenhagen, Stockholm	1986	
Aart Architects	Aarhus		
Arkitema	Aarhus Copenhagen, Stockholm, Oslo	1969	
BBP Arkitekter	Copenhagen	1992	Eva Jarl Hansen
Bjarke Ingels Group	Copenhagen, New York City, London	2005	Bjarke Ingels
Bystrup Architecture Design Engineering	Copenhagen	1994	
C. F. Møller Architects	Aarhus, Copenhagen, Aalborg, Oslo, Berlin, Stockholm, Malmö, Göteborg	1924	
Christensen & Co	Copenhagen	2006	Michael Christensen
CEBRA	Aarhus	2001	
Cobe	Copenhagen	2006	Dan Stubbergaard
Cubo Architects	Aarhus	1992	
Dissing + Weitling	Copenhagen	1971	
Dorte Mandrup Arkitekter	Copenhagen	1999	Dorte Mandrup
Entasis	Copenhagen	1996	
Friis & Moltke	Aarhus, Aalborg, Copenhagen	1955	
Gehl Architects	Copenhagen	2000	Jan Gehl
Gottlieb Paludan Architects	Copenhagen	1901	
Henning Larsen Architects	Copenhagen, Munich, Riyadh, Istanbul	1959	Henning Larsen
JDS Architects	Copenhagen, Brussels	2006	Julien De Smedt
Juul Frost Arkitekter	Copenhagen, Malmö	1990	
KHR Arkitekter	Copenhagen	1946	
Kjær & Richter	Aarhus, Copenhagen	1967	
Lenschow & Pihlmann	Copenhagen	2015	Kim Lenschow Andersen, Søren Thirup Pihlmann
Lundgaard & Tranberg	Copenhagen	1983	
Mikkelsen Architects	Copenhagen	2012	Stig Mikkelsen
Nord Architects	Copenhagen	2003	
PLH Architects	Copenhagen	1977	
Rørbæk & Møller Arkitekter	Charlottenlund	1950	
Schmidt Hammer Lassen	Copenhagen, Aarhus, Shanghai, Singapore	1986	
Tegnestuen Vandkunsten	Copenhagen	1970	
Vilhelm Lauritzen Arkitekter	Copenhagen	1922	
White Architects	Stockholm, Copenhagen, Næstved		

=== Defunct ===
Company	Location	Years	Principal architect
Hvidt & Mølgaard	Copenhagen	1944-2009	

== See also ==
- List of Danish architects
