= Sven Risom =

Danish architect

Sven Julius Risom (Born in Copenhagen, 3 November 1880, died 24 March 1971) was a Danish architect who worked mainly in the style of Nordic Classicism.

== Biography ==
Sven Risom was born in Copenhagen on 3 November 1880, the son of Johan Maria Risom (d. 1915) and Thalia Rothe (d. 1918). His father was a doctor at the Royal Danish Theatre. Risom began his studies in Birkerød in 1899, becoming a journeyman carpenter in 1902. After time at the Technical University of Denmark (during which he studied under Gustav Vermehren and Emil Blichfeldt), he later attended the Royal Danish Academy of Fine Arts, graduating with a degree in architecture in 1909.

In the meantime, Risom had been employed in a number of architectural projects. From 1905 to 1906, he was employed by Hermann Baagøe Storck as co-supervisor (along with Andreas Clemmensen and Ulrik Plesner) of the restoration of St. Bendt's Church in Ringsted. Risom then worked for the Association of 3 December 1892, a group dedicated to historic preservation, leading a 1906 survey of older Danish architecture. In 1907, he worked with Hother A. Paludan as co-supervisor of surveying and repair of old granite churches in Jutland. Risom opened his own architectural office in 1908.

Risom spent 1911–1913 at the French School at Athens, during which time he participated in the excavation of ancient Greek artifacts. He spent 1914 touring Greece, Norway, and Sweden. He would later tour France in 1920.

On 31 March 1915 Risom married Inger Henriques (Copenhagen, 29 March 1888 — Hillerød, 29 August 1978), daughter of the writer Axel Henriques and Adelheid Fred Meyer. One of their sons, Jens Risom (b. Copenhagen, 8 May 1916), would later emigrate to the United States and become a renowned furniture designer.

Upon his return to Denmark, Risom assisted Thorvald Jørgensen in renovating the Royal Reception Rooms at the Christiansborg Palace from 1915 to 1916.

In addition to his work as a practicing architect, Risom served as an external examiner of the Royal Danish Academy of Fine Arts from 1917; was a member of the board of the Architects' Association of Denmark 1920–21; and from 1933, oversaw the inventories of items at the inhabited residences of the Danish monarch, for which service, he was made a Knight of the Order of the Dannebrog.

== Works ==
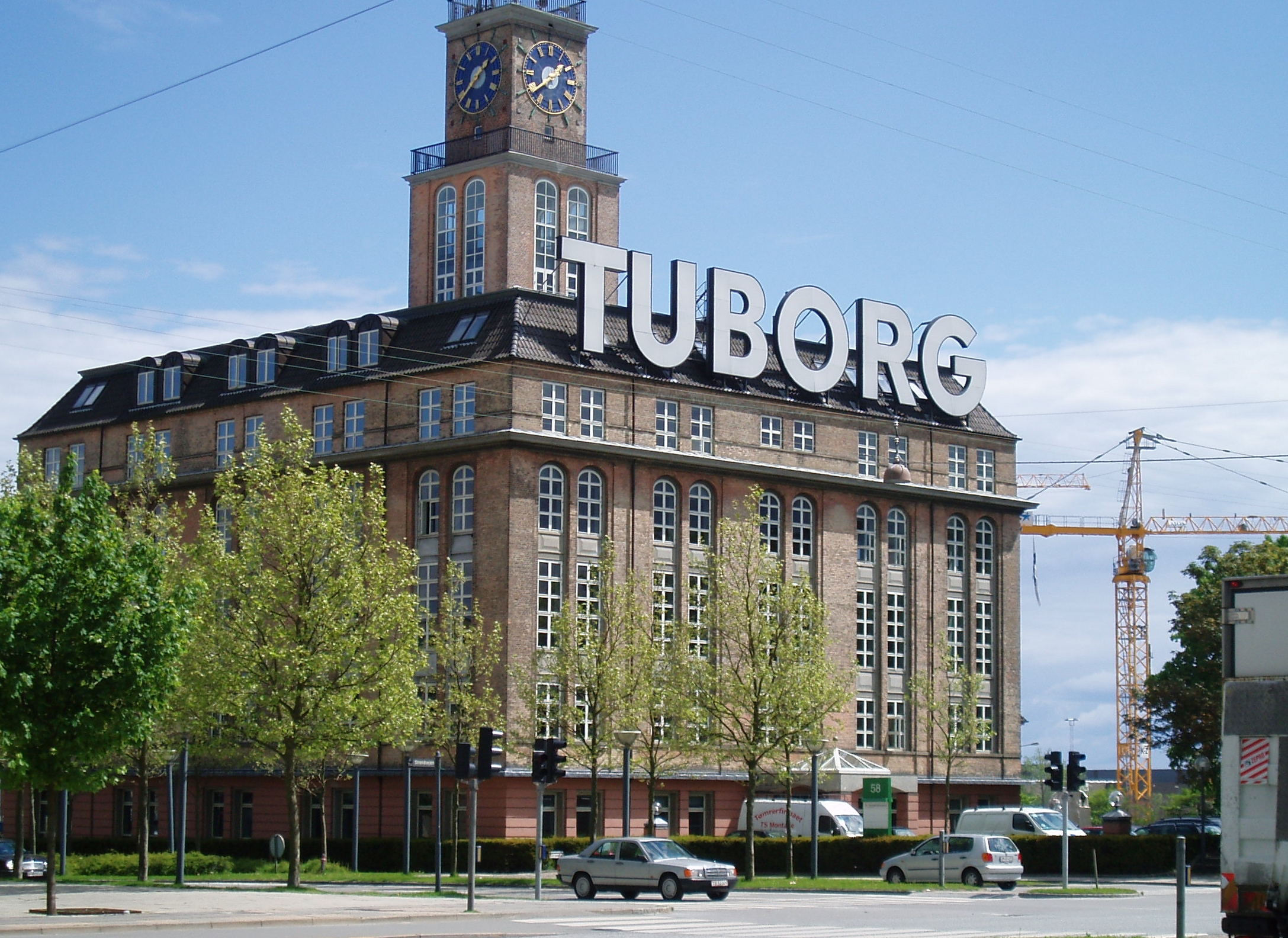
The Tuborg Brewery's Mineral Water Bottling Plant in Hellerup prior to its demolition.

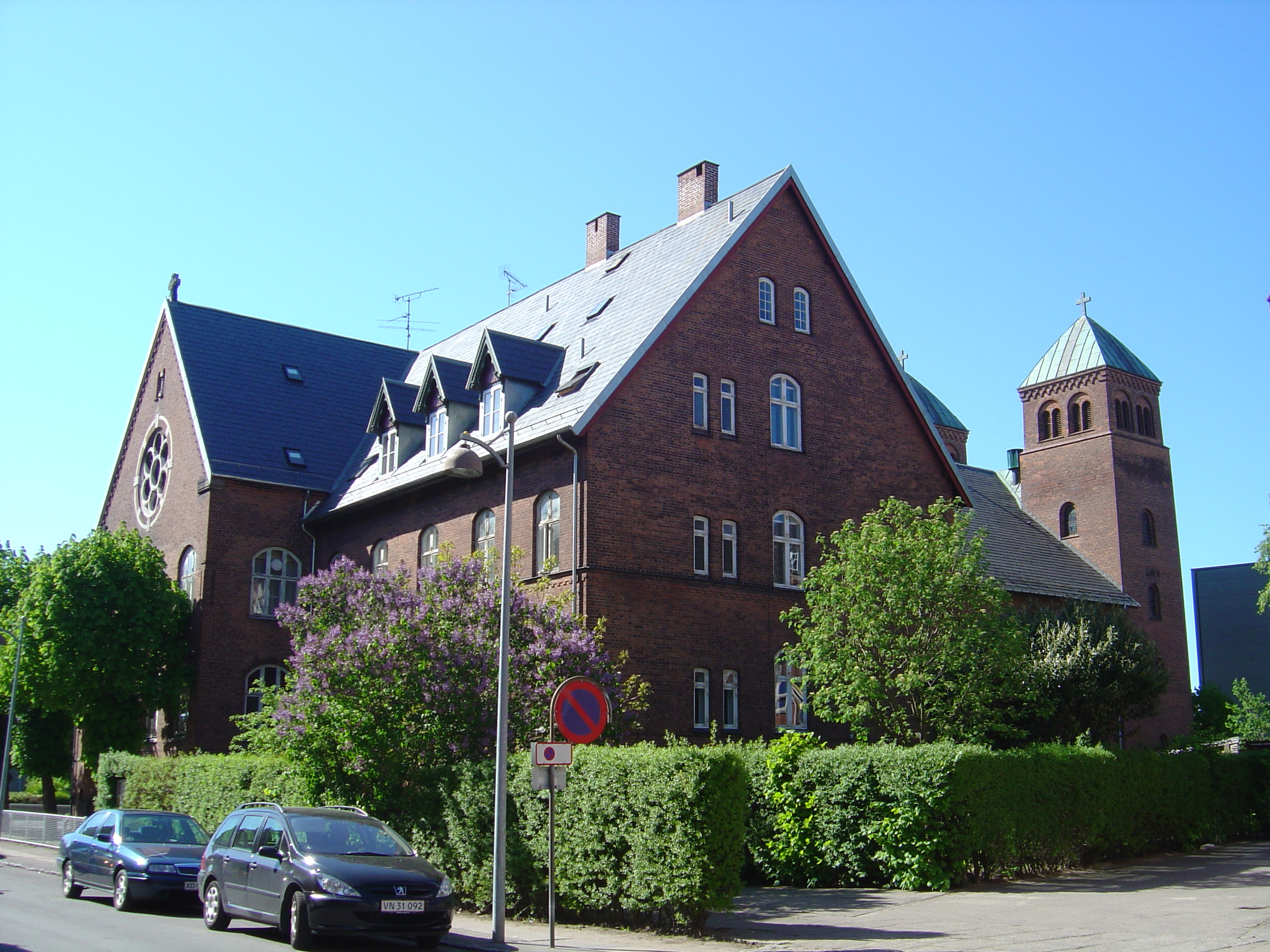
St. Anne's Church, Copenhagen (1936).

- Hunting Lodge, Salten Langsø (1908)
- Village Hall, Ballum (1909–11)
- Village Hall, Jejsing (1909–11)
- Knudsvej Villa, Rungsted, Hørsholm Municipality (1917)
- Villa for lawyer Axel Simonsen, Rungsted, Hørsholm Municipality (1917)
- Ankerhus, Blokhus (1917)
- House at Svanemøllevej 16, Copenhagen (1917)
- Søbæk Overgaard, Mørdrupvej 69–75, Espergærde (1918)
- Villa RosenlundVedbæk Strandvej 328, FC (later merged with Trørød) (1919)
- Villa Clovelly, Vallerød by Rungsted, Hørsholm Municipality (1920)
- Extensions of brew houses on Tuborg and Kongens Bryghus (1920, demolished)
- Development plan for 2 sites in Hørsholm Municipality (1922, together with JP Andersen)
- Old Folks' Home, Hørsholm (1922)
- Mineral Water Bottling Plant owned by Tuborg Brewery, Strandvejen 54, Hellerup (1923)
- Grain Silo at Tuborg (1924, together with Carl Jensen, demolished)
- Tuborg's Headquarters, Svanemøllevej 57–61, Copenhagen (1925, rebuilt)
- Villa, Grut Allé 10, Hellerup (1927)
- Villa Christiansholmsvej 23, Klampenborg (1928)
- Villa, Brodersens Allé 13, Hellerup (1928)
- Villa Ålholmvej 46, Valby (1930)
- Estates Clarasvej 5–13, Charlottenlund (1930–31), awarded by Gentofte Municipality
- Villa Maglemosevej 51, Hellerup (1934, together with Christian Tyge Tillisch)
- Villa Parkovsvej 5, Gentofte (1934, with the same award from Gentofte Municipality)
- Villa, Swan Vænget 21, Copenhagen (1935)
- Estates Nordhavn Yard, Østbanegade 145–61, Copenhagen (1934, together with Christian Tyge Tillisch)
- Business Offices, Nørregade 15, Copenhagen (1934–35)
- Hotel Frederik IV and Store Kro in Fredensborg (1936)
- Housing, Plantevej / Vangedevej (1948–49, together with Svend Albinus)

=== Restorations and renovations ===
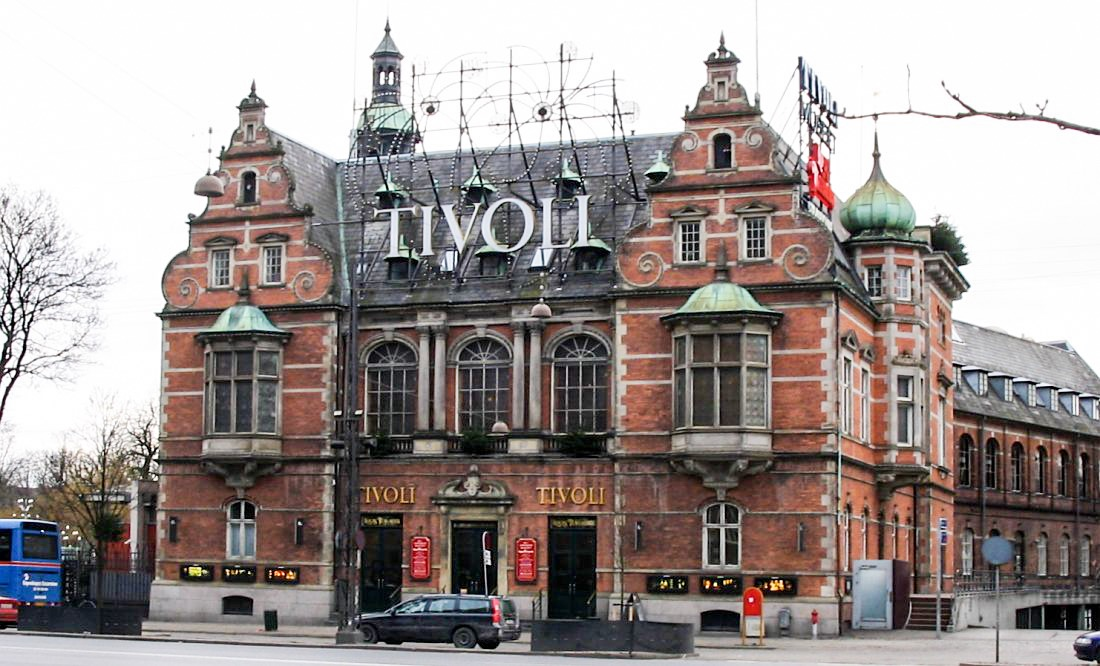
Hans Christian Andersen Castle, renovated by Risom in 1923.

- United Breweries Headquarters, now known as Hans Christian Andersen Castle, Tivoli Gardens, Copenhagen (1923)
- Langeliniepavillonen restaurant, Copenhagen (1933)
- Main Building, Øbjerggård (1938)
- Store Kro, Fredensborg (1936, together with CT Tillisch)
