= Lohse (disambiguation) =

Lohse is a German-language surname.

Lohse may also refer to:

- Lohse (lunar crater)
- Lohse (Martian crater)
