= Niels Arp-Nielsen =

Danish architect

Niels Arp-Nielsen (28 May 1887 – 23 May 1970) was a Danish architect.

Niels Peter Edvard Arp-Nielsen was born at Frederiksberg, Denmark. From 1903 to 1906, he attended Technical University of Denmark in Copenhagen and was trained at the Royal Danish Academy of Fine Arts from 1906 to 1915. Arp-Nielsen had an independent firm from 1915. He exhibited at Charlottenborg Spring Exhibition 1920–1922. Building designs include the Nordisk Film Company's office and factory in Copenhagen Freeport (1915) and the Trade and Agriculture Bank in Slagelse (1922).

== See also ==
- List of Danish architects
