= Arnfred =

Arnfred is a surname. Notable people with the surname include:

- Jens Thomas Arnfred (born 1947), Danish architect
- Morten Arnfred (1945–2025), Danish film director and screenwriter
