= Altenau (disambiguation) =

Altenau is a town in Lower Saxony.

Altenau may also refer to:

- Altenau (Oker), a tributary of the Oker in eastern Lower Saxony
- Altenau (Alme), a tributary of the Alme in eastern North Rhine-Westphalia
- Altenau, a part of Mühlberg, Brandenburg, Germany

== People with the surname ==
- Cornelis Altenau (died 1558), Danish-German builder

== See also ==
- Altnau
- Altena (disambiguation)
- Altona (disambiguation)
