= Peter Kjær =

Peter Kjær may refer to:

- Peter Kjær (footballer) (born 1965), Danish footballer, television commentator and sporting director
- Peter Kjær (architect) (1949–2021), rector of Umeå School of Architecture
