= Ernst Antoft =

Danish architect

- Born: 1901
- Died: 1985 (aged 83–84)
- Occupation: Architect

Ernst Antoft (1901–1985) was a Danish architect. His works include Tjæreby Parish School.

== See also ==
- List of Danish architects
