= Aarhus School of Architecture =

Architecture school in Aarhus, Denmark

- Arkitektskolen Aarhus
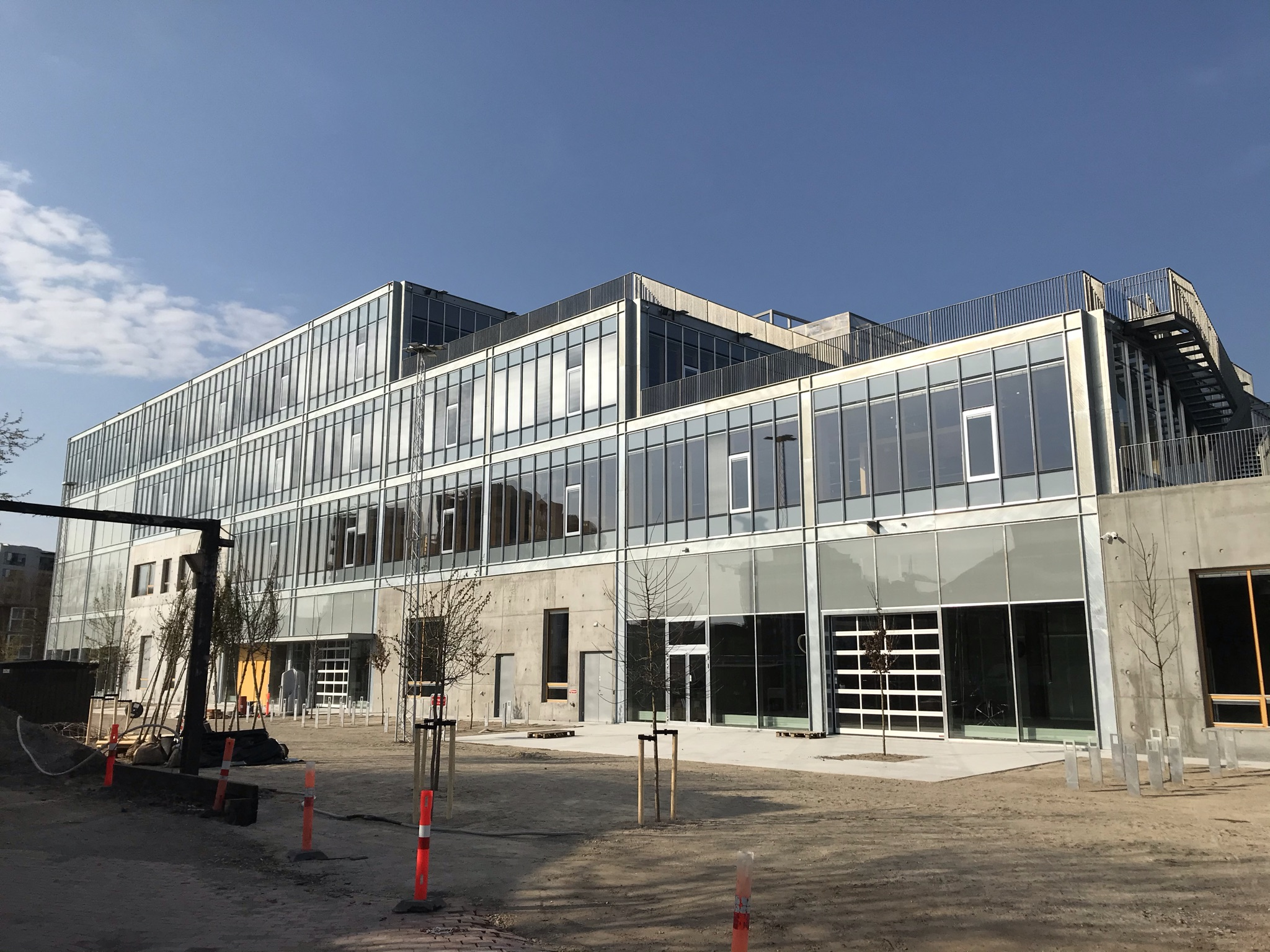
- Type: Public university
- Established: 1965; 61 years ago
- Rector: Torben Nielsen
- Students: 750
- Location: Aarhus, Denmark; 56°09′40″N 10°12′45″E
- Campus: Aarhus
- Website: Aarhus School of Architecture

The Aarhus School of Architecture (Arkitektskolen Aarhus) was founded in 1965 in Aarhus, Denmark. Along with the Royal Danish Academy of Fine Arts, School of Architecture in Copenhagen, it is responsible for the education of architects in Denmark. The school has approximately 750 students.

== Educational structure and content ==
Teaching at the Aarhus School of Architecture is studio-based, emphasising group work and project work. The school places an emphasis on practice-based teaching, while maintaining an artistic approach to architecture. Teaching is organised around a number of research labs, based on on-going and close dialogue with teachers. Workshop facilities allow students to explore their ideas in 3D and in 1:1. Other resources include a specialised library, a materials shop and a robot lab.

In 2016 the school's research was restructured as three research labs:

Research Lab 1: Territories, Architecture, and Transformation

Research Lab 2: Technology and Building Cultures

Research Lab 3: Radical Sustainable Architecture

Research is carried out within the school’s three focus areas: habitation, transformation, and sustainability – as well as in the field of research by design.

Besides Bachelor’s, Master’s and PhD programmes the school offers supplementary education for architects and similar professional groups at various levels. Research at the school is also to a high degree practice-based, i.e. based on cooperation with architectural practices located internationally and locally. The high concentration of architectural practices in Aarhus provides a sound basis for this cooperation.

The Aarhus School of Architecture is an educational institution under the Danish Ministry for Science, Innovation and Higher Education.

== School buildings ==
The school is situated in the Nørre Stenbro neighborhood on Nørreport. The campus comprises the listed building known as Raae's House (Danish: Raaes Gård) from 1798 and a newer building from 1997 with auditorium and an exhibition hall.

Raae's House is a brick building in Neoclassical style built by Hans Fridrich Raae, one of the foremost merchants in the city during the 18th century. It was originally built on the northern edge of the city by the city walls on what was at the time Studsgade. It is one of the best examples of Neoclassical architecture in Aarhus and one of the last remaining brick built merchant's houses of that time. The building is in 4 wings with a courtyard in the middle but only the house facing the street is constructed in brick with the remaining being half-timbered structures with Baroque elements. The building was listed in 1919.

In 1997 the architects firm Kjaer & Richter built an addition on an adjacent plot of land. It was designed in a modernistic style of concrete with glass facade. It is structured as a rectangular, black box with a dominating glass facade facing the street, intentionally contrasting the old building next to it. The design is modelled as a house-in-house with the auditorium appearing like an interior island that divides the building in an exhibition hall and foyer.

In 2021, the Aarhus School of Architecture moved to a new building in the Godsbanearealerne/Godsbanen area in Aarhus. It is Denmark’s first new-built school of architecture.

== Notable faculty members ==
Some notable rectors and teachers include:

- Christian Frederik Møller, the schools first rector (1965–69).
- Arne Karlsen (Architect), teacher in furniture design from 1965, rector (1968–72) and professor (1984–93).
- Johannes Exner, teacher in architectural restoration from 1965 and professor (1984–92).
- Sven Hansen, teacher in landscape architecture and gardening from 1965 and professor (1976–80).
- Johan Richter, teacher from 1965.
- Ray Okamoto, teacher in urban planning from 1965.
- Peter Kjær, rector (1999–2005)
- Kristine Jensen, teacher (1996–2002)
- Adrian Carter, teacher (2000–?)
- Michael Sorkin professor (unknown)
- Chris Thurlbourne, teacher and head of the Master's Program (?).

== Notable alumni ==
- Helle Juul (grad. 1981)
- Kim Herforth Nielsen (grad. 1981)
- Kristine Jensen, landscape architect (grad. 1983)
- Michael Christensen (grad. 1989)
- Lone Wiggers (grad. 1989)
- Ellen Braae, landscape architect (grad. 1991)
- Lene Dammand Lund (grad. 1991)
- Dorte Mandrup (grad. 1991)
