= Domenicus Badiaz =

Danish architect

Domenicus Badiaz (fl. 1607) was a Danish architect probably of Italian origin in Renaissance Denmark. His name can be attached to various castles in Denmark including Lykkesholm Castle and Nyborg Castle (1607).

== See also ==
- List of Danish architects
