= Paludan =

Paludan is a surname. Notable people with the surname include:

- Ann Paludan (1928–2014), British scholar of Chinese history, sculpture, and architecture
- Frederik Paludan-Müller (1809–1876), Danish poet
- Hans Paludan Smith Schreuder (1817–1882), Norwegian 19th century missionary to Zulu
- Jens Theodor Paludan Vogt (1830–1892), Norwegian engineer
- Johannes Paludan (1912–2001), Danish architect
- Knud Paludan (1908–1988), Danish ornithologist
- Phillip S. Paludan (1938–2007), historian
- Rasmus Paludan (bishop) (1702–1759), Norwegian theologian and priest
- Rasmus Paludan (born 1982), Danish politician
