= Christian Arntzen =

Norwegian-Danish architect

Christian Arntzen (8 August 1852 – 14 February 1911) was a Norwegian-Danish architect.

Arntzen was born at Alstahaug Municipality in Nordland county, Norway. In 1875, he was admitted to the Royal Danish Academy of Fine Arts. Arntzen worked as a designer with Hermann Baagøe Storck, Ludvig Fenger, and Valdemar Ingemann.

He designed villas and commercial buildings, including the customs house at the Freeport of Copenhagen.

He died in Copenhagen and was buried at Assistens Cemetery.

== See also ==
- List of Danish architects
