= Per Johan Svendsen =

Danish artist

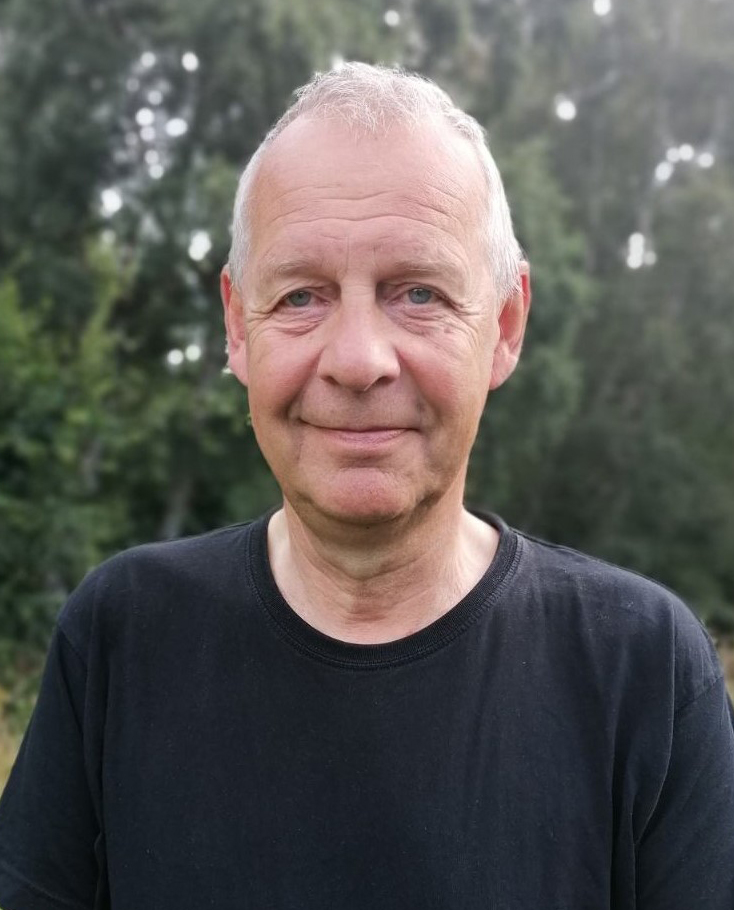
- Born: 13 March 1953
- Citizenship: Danish
- Education: Royal Danish Academy of Fine Arts
- Occupation(s): painter, illustrator
- Years active: 1979–present
- Website: www.perjohansvendsen.dk

Signature
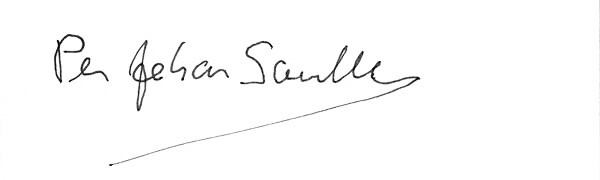

Per Johan Svendsen (born 1953 in Copenhagen) is a Danish painter. He was educated at The Royal Danish Academy of Fine Arts from 1974 to 1981.

In the 1980s and 1990s, Per Johan Svendsen was active in the Danish art group Syntese, which he founded in 1983 together with Steen Krarup Jensen and Flemming Vincent. The group's activities were wide-ranging and included exhibitions, societal debates, a lawsuit against Unibank (Denmark), happenings, professional art debates, as well as a collective application for a professorship at the Royal Danish Academy of Fine Arts. Syntese sparked significant debate.

In 2022, Per Johan Svendsen received the Henry Heerup Honorary Grant.

Beside his work as an artist, Per Johan Svendsen has held the following teaching positions:

- Aarhus Art Academy, experimental painting (1989–1990).
- Skolen for Billedkunst, classical drawing, painting, art history (1990–2002).
- Designskolen, modern form (2000–2001).

== Selected decorations ==
- Four large gable paintings in Ahlefeldts Street, Copenhagen (1989).
- National Library of Nicaragua Rubén Darío (1988).
- A school in the Matagalpa mountains, Nicaragua (1988).
- International artist hotel in Managua, Nicaragua (1988).
- Havremarken Skole (1987).

== Selected illustrations ==
- Peter Laugesen's poetry collection "Plettede Plusfours" (1993).
- The anthology "Forsvar for fornuften – om oplevelse og virkelighed" (1987).
- Various illustrations for the magazine Kunst, the magazine Giraffen, among others.

== Exhibitions ==
Over the years, Per Johan Svendsen has exhibited in many different places, including Musikhuset Aarhus, the Easter exhibition in Århus, various spring and autumn exhibitions, Bergen's Kulturbygning, and Oslo Kulturfabrik.
