= Lene Dammand Lund =

Danish architect and educator

Lene Dammand Lund is a Danish architect and educator.

== Early life and education ==
Lene Dammand Lund studied architecture at the Aarhus School of Architecture, where she graduated in 1991. In 2004, she earned an MBA from the Copenhagen Business School.

== Career ==
After working with Danish and international design studios, Dammand Lund was editor of the Danish architecture journal Arkitekten (1995-2002). She has also served as managing director of the SLA urban development consultancy (2006–12). She has been a member of the board of Freja Ejendomsforeningen since 2004 and of Signal Arkitektur since 2005.

In April 2012 she was appointed rector of the schools of architecture, design, and conservation at the Royal Danish Academy of Fine Arts.

== Published works ==
- Dammand Lund, Lene (2003). 3 X Nielsen. Danish Architectural Press. ISBN 978-87-7407-278-2.
