= Feodor Asmussen =

Danish architect

- Born: Feodor Alexander Asmussen; 18 June 1887
- Died: 1961 (aged 73–74)

Feodor Alexander Asmussen (18 June 1887–1961) was a Danish architect. His works ranged from villas, to bank buildings and factories. He designed the City Hall in Hjorring in 1919 winning 3rd prize in a competition.

== See also ==
- List of Danish architects
