= Svend Axelsson =

Danish modernist architect

Svend Axelsson (born 5 May 1937 in Hadsund) is a Danish modernist architect, who for many years was a partner in KHR Architects along with Knud Holscher.

Axelsson has won numerous projects and architectural competitions in Copenhagen and the Danish Pavilion for the World Exhibition Expo 92 in Seville in 1992, for which he won the Nykredit Architecture Prize. He also won a prize in 1989 for his design of Terminal B in Copenhagen Airport. He is a member of the Federation of Danish Architects.

== Major works ==
Architecture:with Knud Holscher

- Odense University, Denmark. Competition 1967, construction 1971 onwards
- Royal Theatre, Copenhagen, Denmark. 1. prize, competition 1979. Not built.
- Bahrain National Museum, Bahrain, 1982–1988
- Copenhagen Airport, Terminal B, Denmark, 1986
- Copenhagen Airport, Domestic Terminal, Denmark, 1988–1989

== See also ==
- List of Danish architects
