= Lohse =

Lohse is a German-language surname. Notable people with the name include:

- Adolf Lohse (1807–1867), Prussian master builder and architect
- Anna Lohse (1866–1942), Danish teacher and women's rights activist
- Bobby Lohse (born 1958), Swedish sailor
- Brian Lohse (born 1968), American politician
- Bruno Lohse (1911–2007), German art dealer and looter during World War II
- Detlef Lohse (born 1963), German physicist
- Elfriede Lohse-Wächtler (1899–1940), German artist
- Ernst Lohse (1944–1994), Danish architect and designer
- Gustav Lohse (1911–1999), German film editor
- Hinrich Lohse (1896–1964), Nazi German politician and war criminal
- Ingelore Lohse (born 1945), German sprinter
- Kyle Lohse (born 1978), American baseball pitcher
- Marleen Lohse (born 1984), German actress
- Martin Lohse (born 1971), Danish composer and artist
- Martin J. Lohse (born 1956), German physician and pharmacologist
- Oswald Lohse (1845–1915), German astronomer
- Otto Lohse (1859–1925), German conductor and composer
- René Lohse (born 1973), German ice dancer
- Richard Paul Lohse (1902–1988), Swiss painter and graphic artist
- Selma Lohse (1883–1937), German politician
