= Helle Juul =

Danish architect (born 1954)

- Born: 29 June 1954 (age 72); Vester Hjermitslev
- Education: Aarhus School of Architecture; Royal Danish Academy of Fine Arts
- Occupation: Architect
- Practice: Juul Frost Arkitekter

Helle Juul (born 1954) is a Danish architect. Together with her husband and partner Flemming Frost (born 1953) she has worked mainly in the area of urban planning and development. In 1990, she and Frost founded Juul Frost Arkitekter in Copenhagen.

== Biography ==
Born on 29 June 1954 in Vester Hjermitslev in the north west of Jutland, Juul attended the Aarhus School of Architecture where she graduated in 1981. Since her graduation, Juul has cooperated with fellow-graduate Flemming Frost. From 1984 to 1989, she was head of the Skala Architecture Gallery and co-editor of the journal Skala. Thereafter she headed the Danish Architecture Centre. In 1994, she earned a PhD in architecture at the Royal Danish Academy of Fine Arts with a thesis on architectural shifts in time and space. In 1996, she was one of the primary organizers of the Charlottenborg exhibition "Overlooking the city : Copenhagen as it is perceived".

At Juul Frost Arkitekter established in 1990, Juul has been closely associated with urban and campus work, especially the development of public spaces. She has taught both in Denmark and abroad, curated exhibitions, contributed numerous articles and books and has participated in discussions on how to improve urban space.
