= Nyborg Slot =

Medieval castle in Funen, Denmark

Coordinates: 55°18′50″N 10°47′16″E

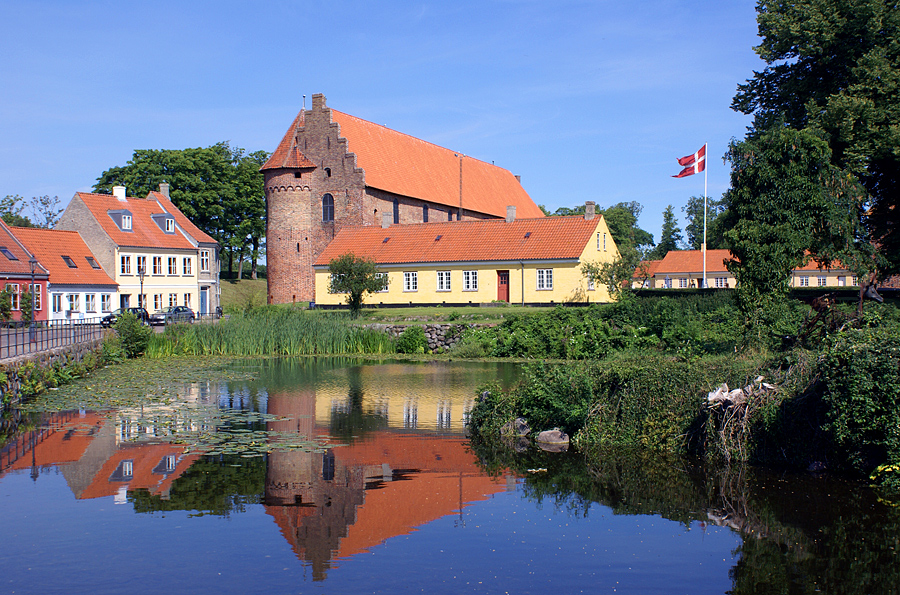
Nyborg Castle

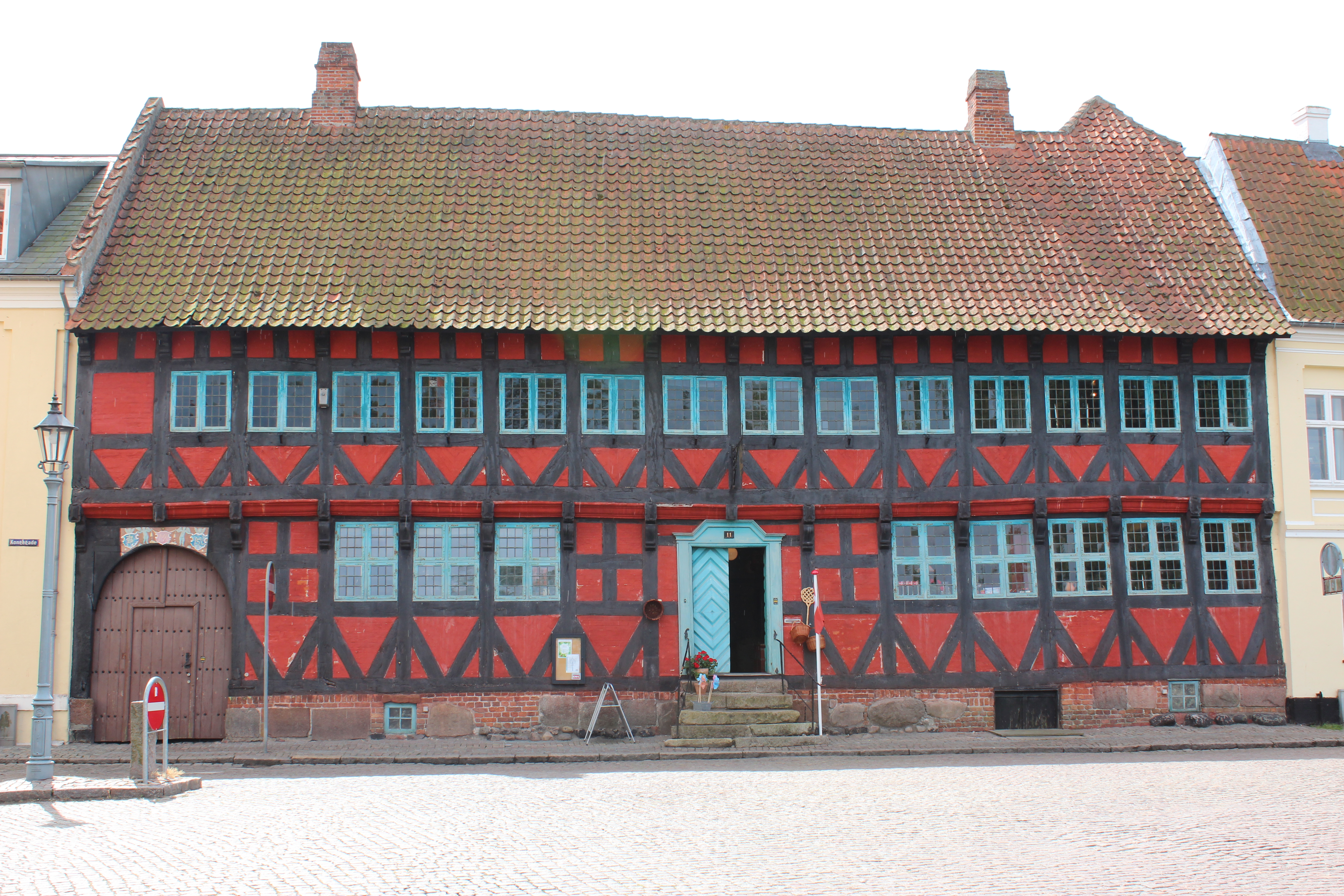
Borgmestergården in Mads Lerches Gård, Nyborg

Nyborg Slot is a restored medieval castle in Nyborg on the Danish island of Funen. The castle figures prominently in Danish history. It was here that King Eric V Klipping signed Denmark's first constitution in 1282. The castle was also the venue for the Danehof, the country's first parliament. The castle is operated as a part of Østfyns Museum (Østfyns Museer) which also includes Borgmestergården in Mads Lerches Gård.

== History ==
Established around 1170, the moated castle was originally square-shaped with corner towers connected by a curtain wall. A residential building (palatium) was constructed next to the west wall in the mid-13th century and a strong defensive tower was built on the east wall. It was here that King Eric V signed Denmark's first constitution in 1282. Until 1413, the palatium was the main venue for the Danehof or medieval parliament.

King Christian III, who frequently stayed in the building, created a new banqueting hall and a tower in the 1540s. Under King Christian IV, additional work was performed by the Italian architect Domenicus Badiaz in 1607, when the main tower (Knudstårnet) received a spire similar to that of Copenhagen's Blåtårn. The castle was seriously damaged during the Dano-Swedish War (1657–58). Thereafter, most of the buildings were torn down, the stone being used from 1722 for the construction of Odense Palace. The buildings still standing were used to store grain or gunpowder. The castle was restored from 1917 to 1923 by Mogens Clemmensen. It then became a museum.

== Restoration ==
The castle was in a sorry state when the garrison left Nyborg in 1913. Nevertheless, encouraged by local interest in the building, the National Museum of Denmark decided to undertake extensive restoration work under the leadership of Mogens Clemmensen. On the basis of carefully conducted archaeological investigations, the work proceeded for some 10 years but in 1925 the funding was exhausted. While most of the building had been restored, work was not completed on much of the north wing or on some of the interior details. In general, Clemmensen based his work on the state of the castle under Christian III but he also added numerous details he discovered in other sources, not always clearly documenting them.

After the restoration, the rooms were fitted out with furniture acquired from various historic manor houses. There are three banqueting halls, each representing an important period in Danish history: the Danehof Room (Danehofsalen) hosted parliamentary meetings, court representatives of the Kalmar Union met in Margrethe's Hall (Margrethes riddersal) while in Christian III's Hall (Christian 3's riddersale) there is a display depicting the period when Nyborg served as the nation's capital until 1560.

Located at Slotsgade 34, the castle is open to visitors from 10 am to 3 pm in April, May, September and October and every day from 10 am to 4 pm in June, July and August.

== Østfyns Museum ==
Østfyns Museum was formed in 2009 by a merger between Kerteminde Museum and Nyborg Museum. The museum had three primary operations: Nyborg Slot including Borgmestergården, Johannes Larsen Museet and the Vikingmuseum Ladby.

== Literature ==
- Hornbeck, Knud; Clemmensen, Mogens; Statens Museumsnævn: Nyborg og Omegns Museer (1996). Nyborg Slot: undersøgelser og restaurering 1914-1925 v/Mogens Clemmensen : rapport til Statens Museumsnævn. Nyborg og Omegns Museer.
