= Ludvig Andersen =

Danish architect

Ludvig Andersen (1861–1927) was a Danish architect. Works include the City and Environs Savings Bank, Løgstør (1891) and Pilegården, Pilestræde, Copenhagen (1897–98).

== See also ==
- List of Danish architects
