= Hans von Andorf =

Danish architect

Hans von Andorf (died 11 March 1600) was a Danish architect. He is first recorded in the historical record in 1570, having been given permission to live in Copenhagen. He was admitted to a guild in 1580, and supervised the rebuilding works at Kronborg circa 1595. He masoned his own gravestone, which was subsequently inscribed incorrectly with the name "Hans von Antwerp". von Andorf married Marine Peters von Alckmor (died 19 March 1600), and the two were buried next to each other in Helsingør.

== See also ==
- List of Danish architects
