= 2021 Hørsholm municipal election =

- 16 November 2021

All 19 seats to the Hørsholm Municipal Council 10 seats needed for a majority
- Turnout: 14,655 (75.2%) ▼1.5pp
	First party	Second party	Third party
	C	V	A
Party	Conservatives	Venstre	Social Democrats
Last election	8 seats, 41.7%	5 seats, 21.8%	3 seats, 10.4%
Seats won	7	7	2
Seat change	▼1	▲2	▼1
Popular vote	5,357	3,846	1,638
Percentage	36.9%	26.5%	11.3%
Swing	▼4.8%	▲4.7%	▲0.9%
	Fourth party	Fifth party	Sixth party
	B	Q	F
Party	Social Liberals	SocialKonservative	Green Left
Last election	1 seat, 6.8%	Did Not Stand	0 seats, 2.8%
Seats won	1	1	1
Seat change	0	▲1	▲1
Popular vote	877	838	617
Percentage	6.0%	5.8%	4.2%
Swing	▼0.8%	New	▲1.4%
	Seventh party	Eighth party
	I	O
Party	Liberal Alliance	Danish People's Party
Last election	1 seat, 6.5%	1 seat, 4.6%
Seats won	0	0
Seat change	▼1	▼1
Popular vote	461	423
Percentage	3.2%	2.9%
Swing	▼3.3%	▼1.7%
Mayor before election
Morten Slotved
Conservatives
Mayor after election
Morten Slotved
Conservatives

Ever since 1970, (Note: the most recent year where the municipality was altered) the Conservatives had held the mayor's position in Hørsholm Municipality. The municipality is one of the strongest areas of the blue bloc, having voted for parties of the bloc by 69.3% in the 2019 Danish general election, the highest percentage of any municipality.

In the 2017 election, Morten Slotved had led the Conservatives to 8 seats, and had eventually won the mayor's position.

In this election, Venstre would write local history, having won 7 seats the same as the Conservatives, marking the first time that the Conservatives would not become the sole largest party in the municipal council. With both parties being equally large, a dramatic battle over the mayor's position was possible. The result would see the Conservatives once again secure the mayor's position, however they used the support of the red bloc.

== Electoral system ==
For elections to Danish municipalities, a number varying from 9 to 31 are chosen to be elected to the municipal council. The seats are then allocated using the D'Hondt method and a closed list proportional representation. Hørsholm Municipality had 19 seats in 2021

Unlike in Danish General Elections, in elections to municipal councils, electoral alliances are allowed.

== Electoral alliances ==
=== Electoral Alliance 1 ===
Party		Political alignment
B	Social Liberals	Centre to Centre-left
F	Green Left	Centre-left to Left-wing
K	Christian Democrats	Centre to Centre-right

=== Electoral Alliance 2 ===
Party		Political alignment
D	New Right	Right-wing to Far-right
I	Liberal Alliance	Centre-right to Right-wing
O	Danish People's Party	Right-wing to Far-right
Q	SocialKOnservative	Local politics
V	Venstre	Centre-right

== Results by polling station ==
Division	A	B	C	D	F	I	K	O	Q	V
Division	%	%	%	%	%	%	%	%	%	%
Hørsholm	12.9	5.5	37.9	2.1	4.0	3.0	0.3	3.0	6.2	25.0
Usserød	13.9	6.0	33.6	2.5	5.4	2.6	0.4	3.5	7.9	24.2
Rungsted	5.3	6.2	41.7	3.4	2.5	5.2	0.1	0.8	2.3	32.5
Grønnegade	4.9	8.7	34.6	6.5	3.8	1.5	1.1	1.5	5.7	31.6
Vallerød	12.0	6.3	35.8	3.1	4.7	2.5	0.5	3.9	5.9	25.3

== Results ==
Party		Votes	%	+/-	Seats	+/-
Hørsholm Municipality
C	Conservatives	5,357	36.89	-4.80	7	-1
V	Venstre	3,846	26.49	+4.68	7	+2
A	Social Democrats	1,638	11.28	+0.83	2	-1
B	Social Liberals	877	6.04	-0.75	1	0
Q	SocialKonservative	838	5.77	New	1	New
F	Green Left	617	4.25	+1.40	1	+1
I	Liberal Alliance	461	3.17	-3.29	0	-1
O	Danish People's Party	423	2.91	-1.70	0	-1
D	New Right	413	2.84	+1.12	0	0
K	Christian Democrats	51	0.35	-0.26	0	0
Total		14,521	100	N/A	19	N/A
Invalid votes		32	0.16	+0.01		
Blank votes		102	0.52	-0.09		
Turnout		14,655	75.24	-1.43		
Source: valg.dk
