= Thorvald Andersen =

Danish architect

Thorvald Andersen (8 April 1883 – 3 May 1935 ) was a Danish architect. He contributed to Rigshospitalet in Copenhagen in the 1920s.

== Family ==
Carl Christian Thorvald Andersen was born in the parish of Årup on the island of Funen in Assens Municipality, Denmark. He is the son of Hans Ditlev Andersen and Petra Vilhelmine Johanne Louise Andersen. He attended Odense Technical School, with a graduation in 1903; He was admitted to the Royal Danish Academy of Fine Arts in 1904 and left in 1910. He worked from 1907 to 1912 with Martin Borch (1852-1937) at Rigshospitalet which, starting in 1910, was relocated to its present location consisting of buildings surrounding a central garden. He worked for a number of years from 1912 with Kristoffer Varming (1865-1936).

He died in 1975 in the Frederiksberg district of Copenhagen and was interred at Søndermark Cemetery.

== See also ==
- List of Danish architects
