= Danehof =

Danish medieval parliament

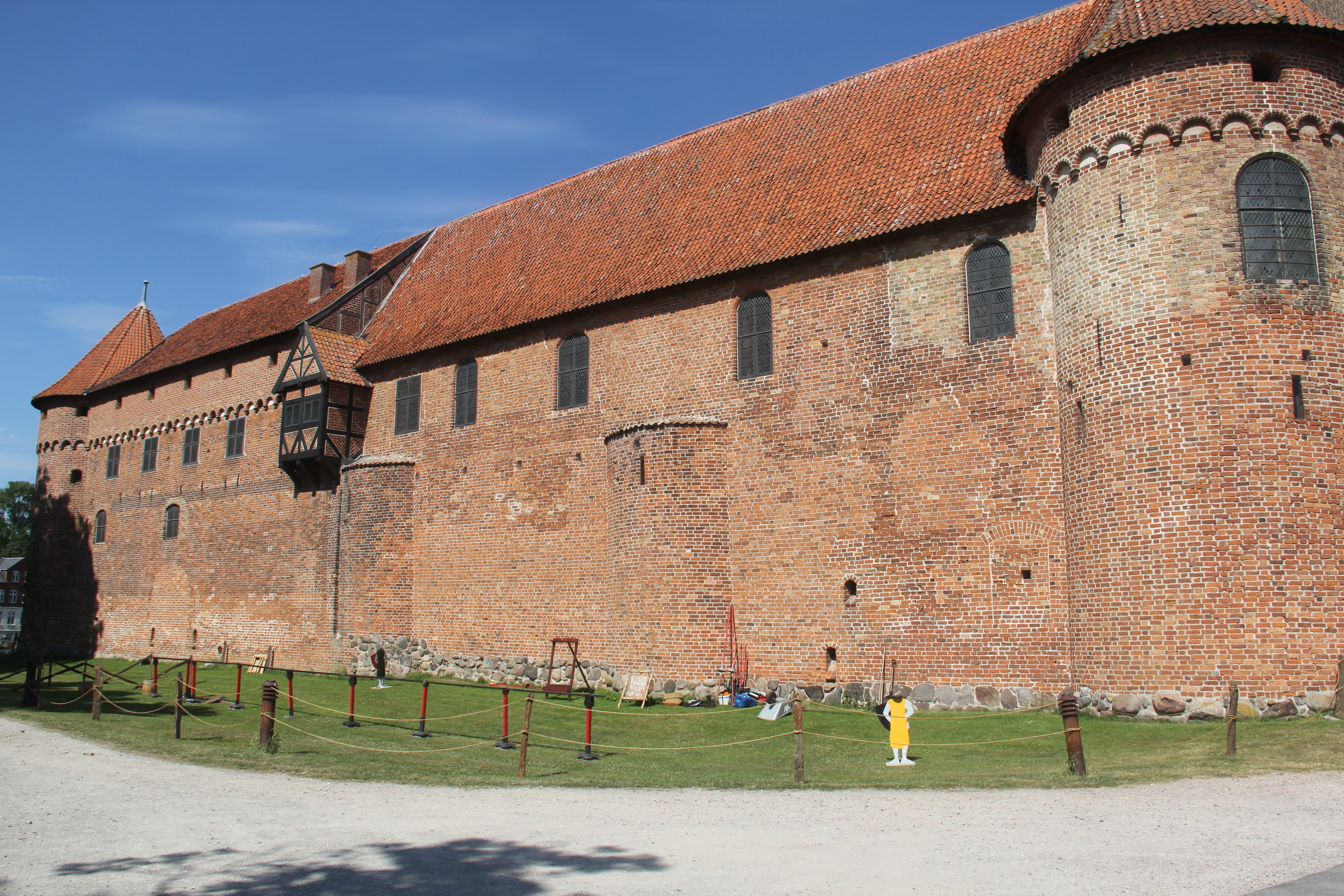
Nyborg Castle, Denmark

Danehof ("Danish Court") was the name of the Danish medieval parliament, which played a certain role between c. 1250 and 1413.

The precondition of the Danehof – like that of the Haandfæstning – was the growing power and opposition among Danish magnates after 1250. They wanted limitations of the royal power, especially of its right of legislation and taxation. The political weakness of the royal house during this period seems to have promoted its development. By 1282, King Eric V of Denmark had so offended the nobles throughout Denmark that he was forced to accept a Royal Charter (Håndfæstning), which limited his authority and guaranteed the ancient rights and customs that preserved the power of the nobles.

About the details of the establishment and form of the Danehof, surprisingly little is known. It had to be gathered at a central site, which was often Nyborg Castle on Funen, centrally located within the Lands of Denmark, but nothing is known of elections or procedures. Its members consisted only of magnates, clergy, and noblemen. The king was to consult this parliament before he took greater steps, especially of an economic character. However, in several cases, the kings ignored the Danehof by omitting to summon it. By the creation of the first Haandfæstning in 1282, more defined rules were established. However, in reality, the Danehof was only summoned on special occasions.

The disasters and chaos in Denmark during the 14th century did not strengthen the authority of the Danehof. Step by step, it was ousted by not only the royal power but also by the Danish Council of the state (Rigsraadet), the Privy Council or inner circle of magnates that often controlled the king. Dating from the 1320s, it became the role of the Rigsraad to rule together with the king and to manage the affairs of the state.
