= Magnus Steendorff =

Swedish architect

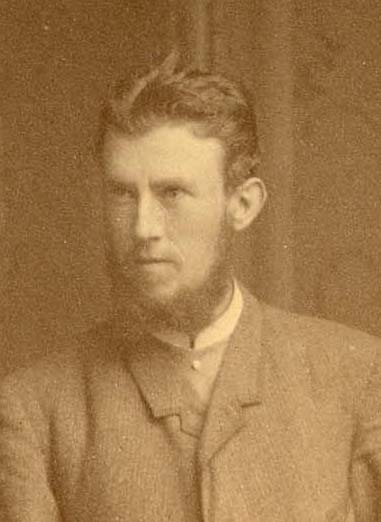
Magnus Steendorff circa 1885

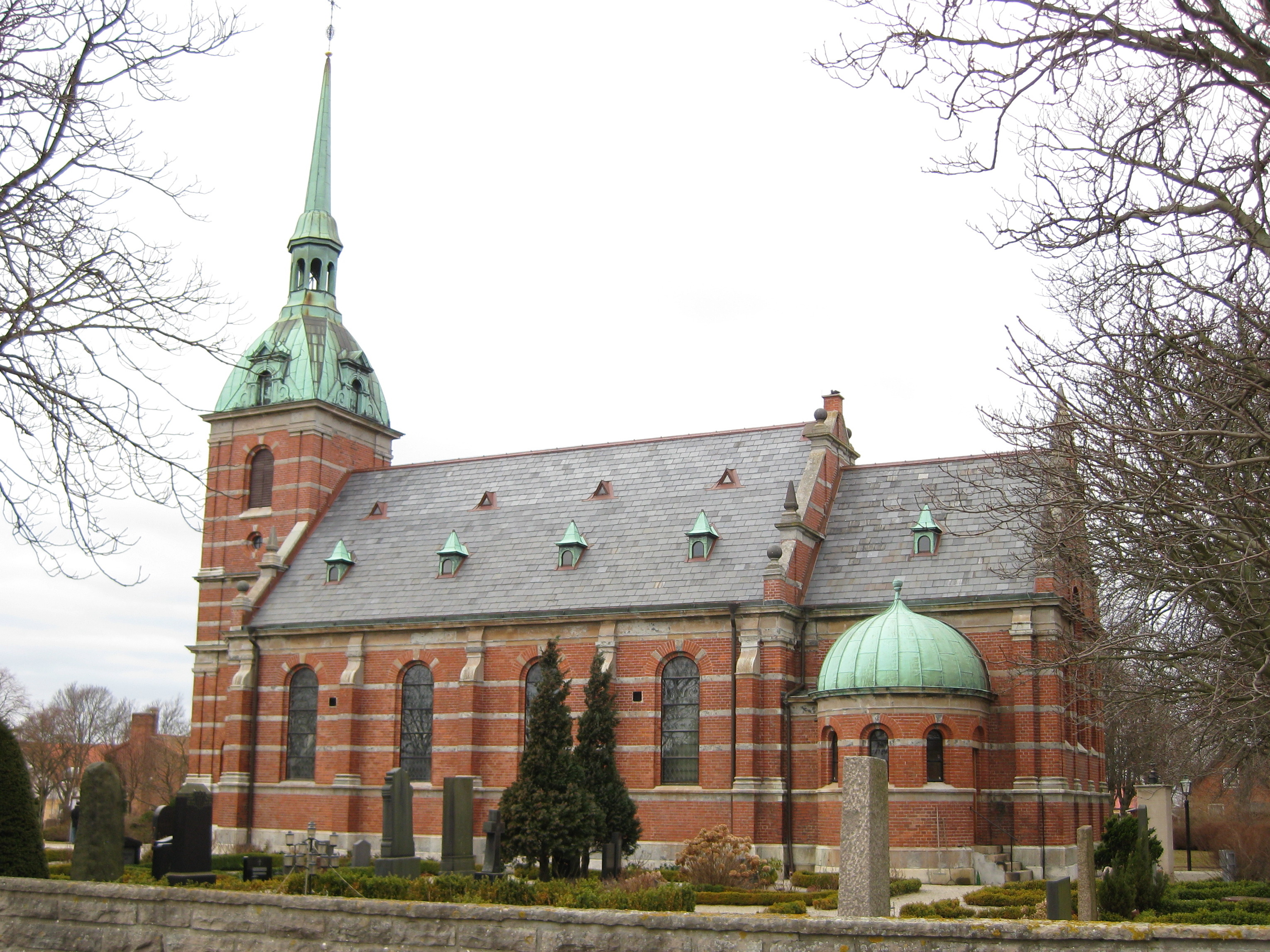
Stora Hammars Church, erected 1891-1895

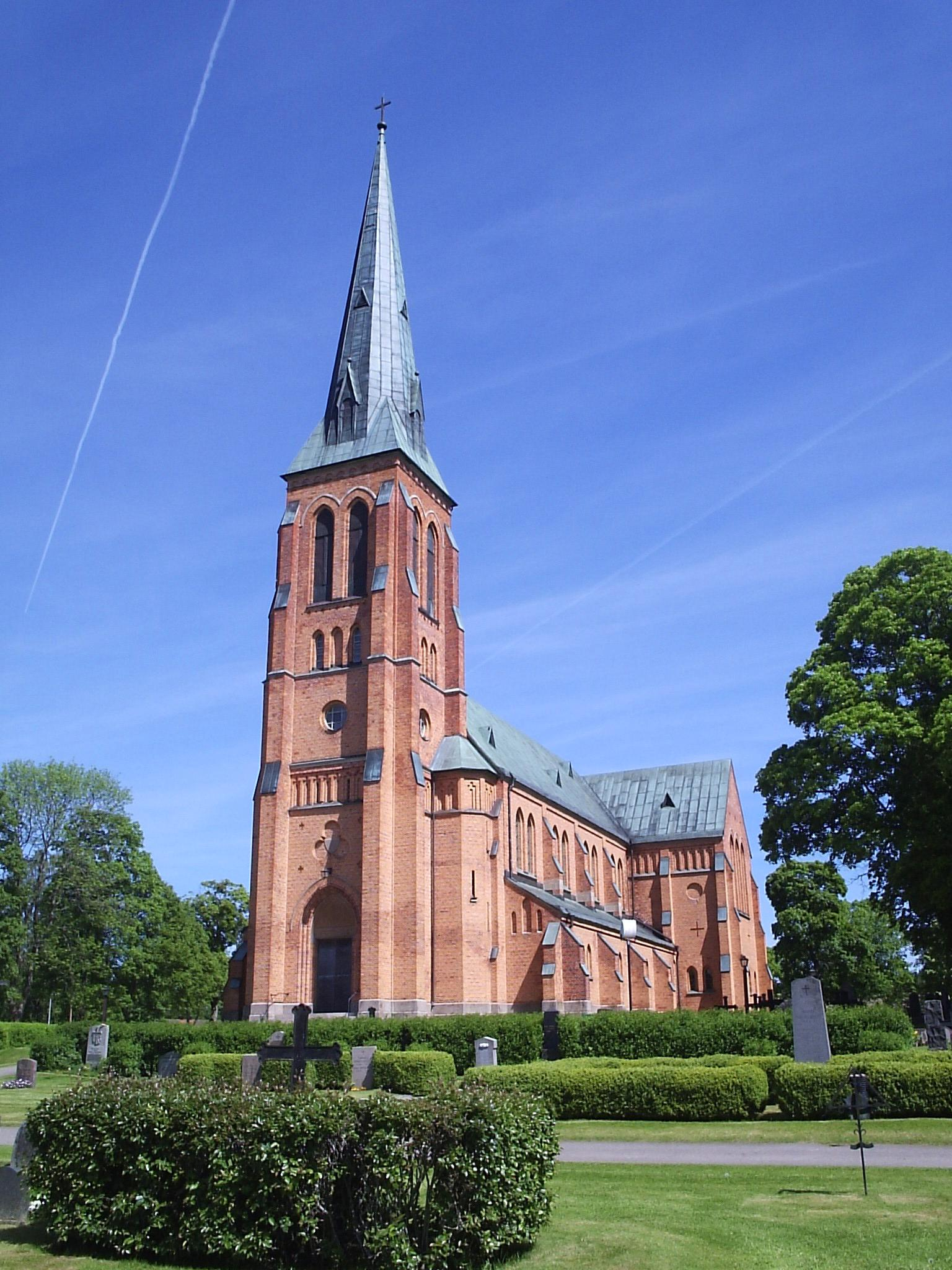
Undenäs Church, erected 1892-1894

Magnus Gottfrid Steendorff (25 November 1855 – 26 April 1945) was a Swedish architect.

== Background ==
Magnus Steendorff was born in Copenhagen as the only son of Danish painter Christian Wilhelm Steendorff (1817–1904) and his wife Swedish Anna Ulrica Öhrström (1816–1891). His sister Anna Marianne Steendorff (1853-1941) was married to Swedish-American linguist, professor, and author August Hjalmar Edgren (1840–1903).

He studied at the Royal Danish Academy of Art in Copenhagen, but settled in Sweden in 1887 becoming a Swedish citizen three years later. He was employed by the Swedish government agency for the administration of state buildings (Överintendentsämbetet).

== Career ==
Notable buildings by Steendorff include two churches: the majestic neogothic Undenäs Church (Undenäs kyrka), also known as the "Cathedral of Tiveden" (Tivedens katedral) from 1892–1894 and the new Stora Hammar Church (Stora Hammars kyrka ) in Höllviken from 1891–1895 designed in Danish Renaissance style.

Steendorff also designed the Institution of Johannesberg, an asylum located outside Mariestad from 1875. Other designed include a bank building in Skövde (1893–1894) and the new library of the University College of Jönköping (originally built as the foundry of a mechanical company in 1914).

== Personal life ==
Steendorff was married to Sofie Brunskog (1855–1948).

== Other Sources ==
- Svenskt porträttgalleri (Swedish portrait gallery), Vol. XX, Stockholm. 1901
