= Marinus Andersen =

Danish architect

Marinus Andersen (19 April 1895, Aalborg - 14 March 1985) was a Danish architect.

== See also ==
- List of Danish architects
