= Juul Frost Arkitekter =

Danish architectural firm

Juul Frost Arkitekter (JFA), often styled Juul | Frost Arkitekter, is a Danish architectural firm headquartered in Copenhagen, Denmark. A branch office, JFA Studio, is located in Malmö, Sweden.

== History ==
Juul Frost Arkitekter was founded in 1990 by Helle Juul and Flemming Frost. The firm opened an office in Malmö in 2012.

Søren Arildskov joined the firm as partner in 2014 and Søren Askehave became partner in 2017. Hanna Svensson, Line Stybe Vestergaard and Philip Krogh became asspcoated partners in 2016.

== Selected projects ==
- Max Bank, Næstved, Denmark (2012)
- Media Evolution City, Malmö, Sweden (2012)
- DTU Skylab, Technical University of Denmark, Copenhagen, Denmark (2015)
- Campus Örebro/Nova House, Örebro University, Örebro, Sweden (2015)
- Sjöjungfrun, Malmö, Sweden (2016)
- Northern Harbour, Sønderborg, Denmark (2016)
