= Lykkesholm Castle =

Manor house in Nyborg Municipality, Denmark

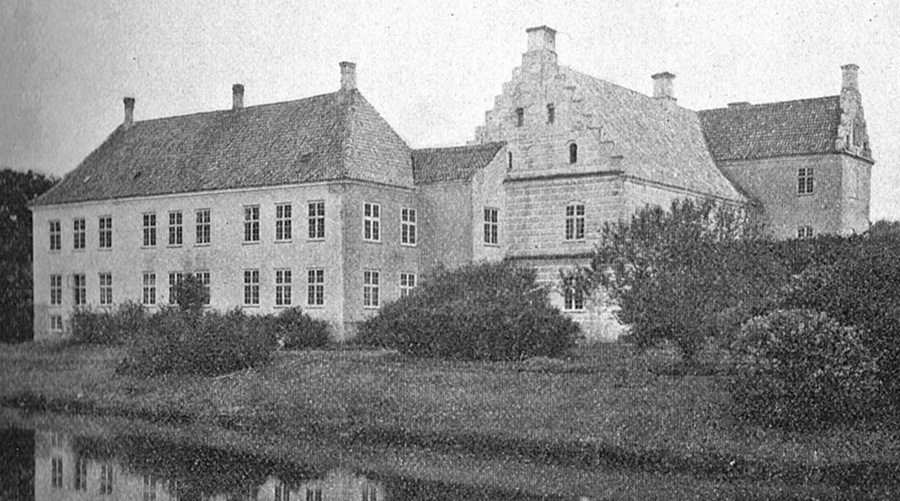
A photo of Lykkesholm Castle

Lykkesholm Castle (Lykkesholm Slot) is a manor house located in the parish of Ellested in Nyborg Municipality, Denmark. The estate is situated about 3 km southwest of the Funen town of Ørbæk and approx. 21 km southeast of Odense.

The main building was built in 1600 under designed by architect Domenicus Badiaz (c. 1591-c. 1607). It was remodeled in 1668 and during 1784–1786. Today it resembles a large manor house painted bright yellow. The property is currently a hotel with conference facilities and breeding farm.
