= Knud Holscher =

Danish architect and industrial designer (1930–2025)

Knud Helmuth Holscher (6 May 1930 – 27 June 2025) was a Danish architect and industrial designer. For many years he was a partner in KHR Architects with Svend Axelsson and designed many of their works together.

== Life and career ==
Holscher studied with Erik Christian Sørensen and professor Arne Jacobsen at the Royal Danish Academy of Fine Arts, School of Architecture, graduating in 1957. He joined the office of Arne Jacobsen in 1960 and moved to England to oversee construction of Jacobsen's St Catherine's College, Oxford in 1962. Holscher was awarded the British Design Award in 1965 and 1966 for work done in collaboration with Alan Tye before accepting a partnership in established Danish architectural office Krohn and Hartvig Rasmussen, later renamed KHRAS. Knud Holscher retired from KHRAS in 1995 and has since headed his own office Knud Holscher Design.

Though starting out as an architect, it is his work as industrial designer which has brought Knud Holscher international attention and recognition. His designs have been linked to the Hochschule für Gestaltung Ulm and to the work of HfG Ulm student Dieter Rams. In 2003, he said of his work: "Design should be like buttons on a shirt. With character to catch your attention, but no more so than you can use it without thinking about it".

He was professor of architecture at the Royal Danish Academy of Fine Arts from 1968 to 1988 and professor of design from 1994. He has received numerous awards for his work and is an Honorary RDI, Royal Designer for Industry since 2004. Dynamic, creative and aware, Knud Holscher's design mantra revolves around constant innovation, with his efforts directed at satisfying the end user's needs. Knud believes that nothing should be created for the sake of beauty alone. In his own words, "Design should not be defined; it formulates itself in the creative process…"

Holscher's designs centered around household items such as cutlery, electric appliances, stationary, or mugs. His style has been described as being “uniformly crisp, clear, simple and light.”

Holscher died on 27 June 2025, at the age of 95.

== Major works ==
Architecture

- Odense University, Denmark. Competition 1967, construction 1971 onwards
- Royal Theatre, Copenhagen, Denmark. 1. prize, competition 1979. Not built.
- Bahrain National Museum, Bahrain, 1982–1988
- Copenhagen Airport, Terminal B, Denmark, 1986
- Copenhagen Airport, Domestic Terminal, Denmark, 1988–1989

Industrial Design

- d line, architectural hardware, since 1971
- ERCO track lights Quinta, since 1990

== Awards ==
- 2001 Dreyer Honorary Award
