= Ellen Braae =

Danish landscape architect

- Born: 1965 (age 60–61)
- Education: Aarhus Cathedral School
- Alma mater: Aarhus School of Architecture
- Occupation: architect
- Years active: 2003-present
- Known for: landscape design

Ellen Marie Braae (born 1965) is a Danish landscape architect and, since April 2014, the first professor of landscape architecture at Copenhagen University.

== Biography ==
Braae was brought up on a farm near Rønde in central Jutland. After matriculating from Aarhus Cathedral School, she followed the family tradition and attended Viborg Gymnastikskole. From there, she went on to study landscape architecture at the Aarhus School of Architecture, graduating in 1991 and earning a PhD in 2003. From 2003 to 2006, she taught urban design at Aarhus University, specializing in landscape architecture until 2009. In 2009, she moved to Copenhagen University where, since April 2014, she has been the university's first professor of theory and methods in landscape architecture. The new position is intended to strengthen landscape architecture as a discipline in its own right. She is also a member of the Danish Council for Independent Research for Culture and Communication. Her research is focused on urban development and open spaces.

Ellen Braae has also gained experience in the private sector. She co-founded the Berg & Braae studio in 1995, Metopos, By- og landskapsdesign in 2005 and Ikaros Press in 2009.

== Family ==
Braae was married to a lecturer from the Aarhus School of Architecture, Kristian Berg Nielsen, who died in 2013. The couple had worked together in their architectural firms and together had founded Ikaros Press where research results have been published, including an extensive work on Inger and Johannes Exner. Ellen Braae lives in Risskov with her two teenage sons.

== Selected publications ==
- Braae, Ellen (March 2015). Beauty Redeemed: Recycling Post-Industrial Landscapes. Ikaros Press. ISBN 978-3-0356-0346-0.
