= Carl Thorvald Andersen =

Danish architect

Carl Thorvald Andersen (Note: In sources mostly mentioned by his initials C. T. Andersen) (9 March 1835 – 10 September 1916) was a Danish carpenter, who became the structural engineer and architect at the Holmen Naval Base in the second part of the 19th century. In this position, he designed a number of buildings for the use of the Royal Danish Navy in line with the accelerating technological development of the day. Today, these buildings are used by, among others, the Kunstakademiets Arkitektskole and the Rhythmic Music Conservatory. Andersen was succeeded in the position of architect by Olaf Schmidth in 1899.

== Buildings designed ==
- Bådeværftet (lit. 'The Boatyard') (1865, listed building)
- Søminevæsenets Værksteder (The Naval Workshops) on Nyholm (1878–93)
- Kobbersmedjen (The Coppersmithy) on Frederiksholm (1884, after the draft by Ferdinand Meldahl, listed building)
- Kedelsmedjen (The Steam Boiler Smithy) on Frederiksholm (1887–88, listed building)
- Artilleriværkstedet (The Artillery Workshop) on the Arsenal Island (1888–94, demolished)
- Beklædningsmagasinet (The Clothing Magazine) on Frederiksholm (1888, listed building)
- Arresthuset (The Jailhouse) on Nyholm (1890, listed building)
- Exercer- og gymnastikhuset (lit. 'The Exercise and Gymnastics House') on Frederiksholm (1890–92, listed building)
- Modelkammeret (lit. 'The Model Chamber') on Frederiksholm (1893, listed building)

== Gallery ==
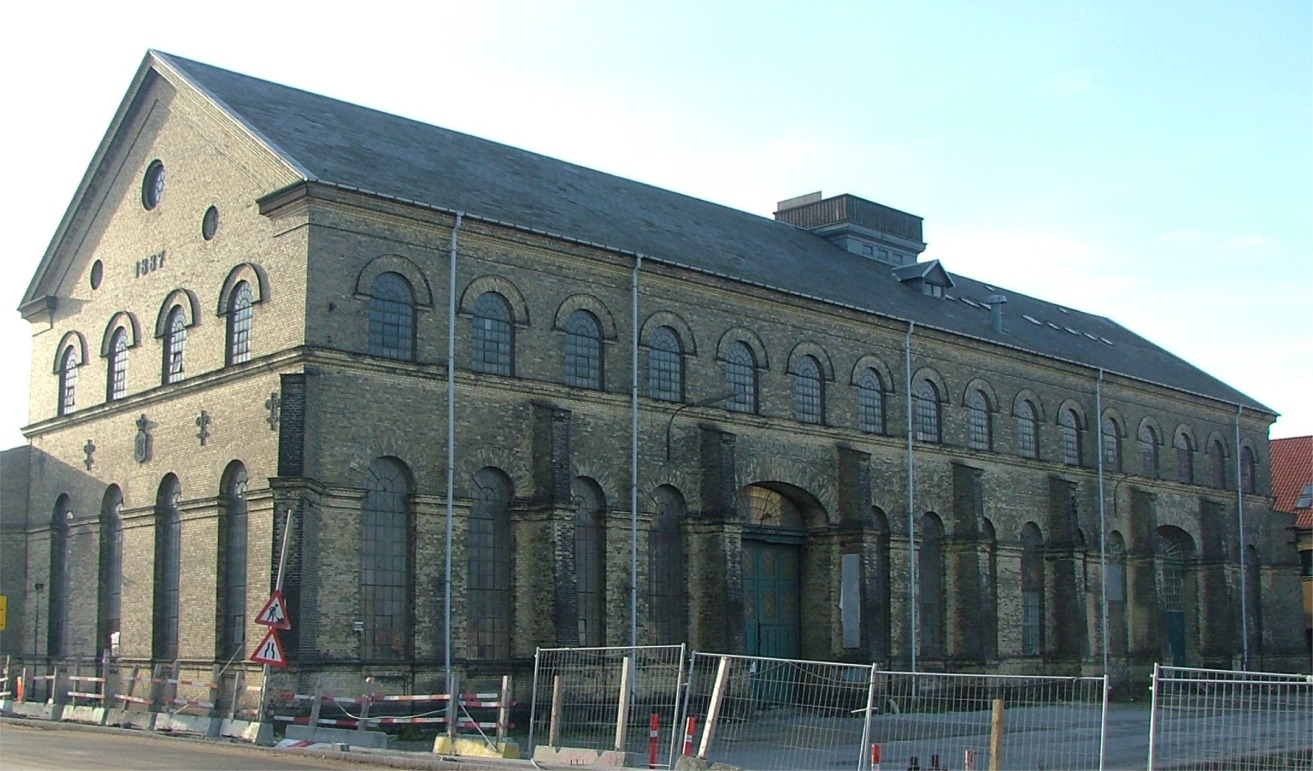
The Steam Boiler Smithy (1887–88)

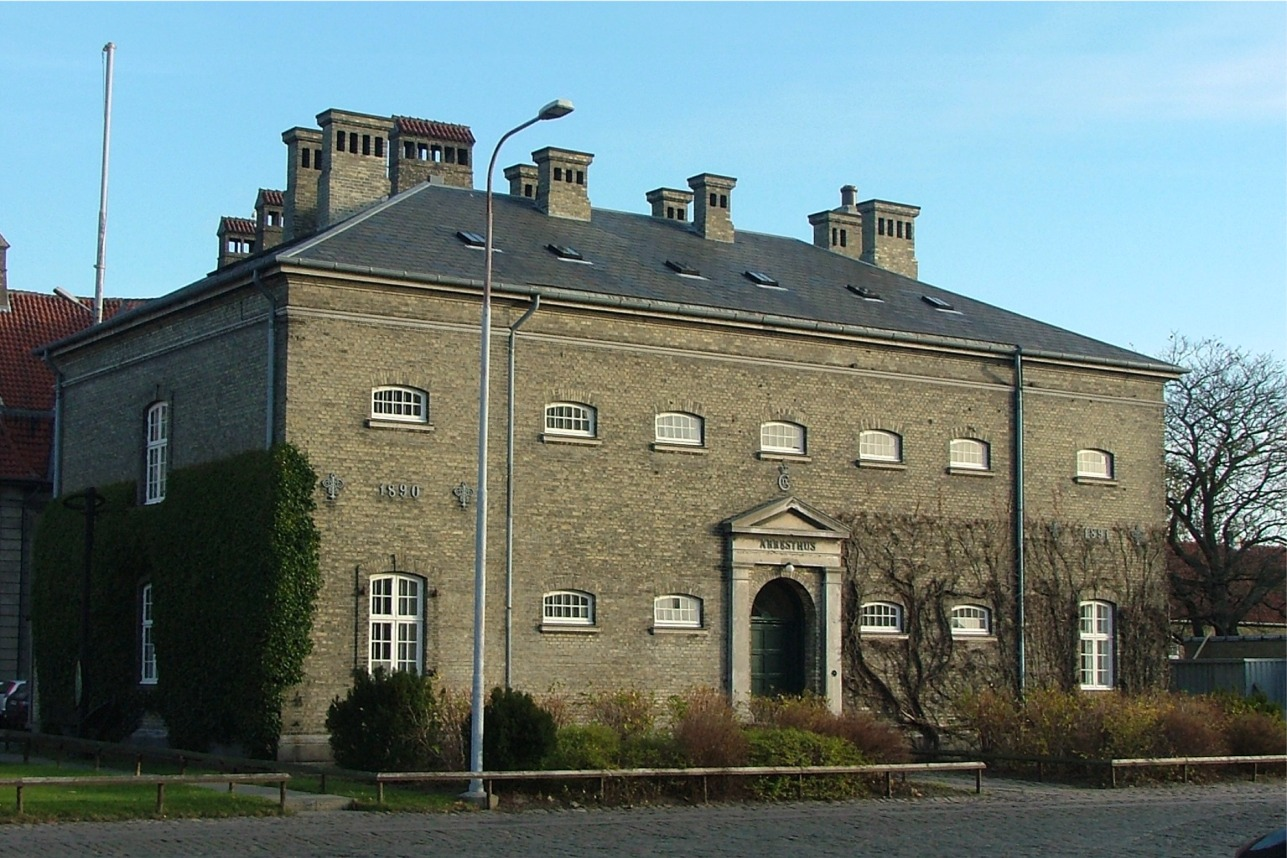
The Jailhouse on Nyholm (1891)

The Exercise and Gymnastics House (1892)

The Model Chamber (1893)

== See also ==
- List of Danish architects
