= Peter Kjær (architect) =

Danish architect and academic (1949–2021)

Peter Krarup Kjær (1949–2021) was a Danish architect. He became director of North Carolina State University's Prague Institute in 2014. Until 2013, he was rector of Umeå School of Architecture and a part of Umeå Arts Campus at Umeå University in Umeå, Sweden, founded in 2009, when the new architecture programme started.

Between 1999 and 2005 Peter Kjær was rector of the Aarhus School of Architecture, Denmark.
