= Jens Thomas Arnfred =

Danish architect (born 1947)

Jens Thomas Arnfred (born 1947) is a Danish architect. He has been external examiner at the School of Architecture since 1981 and Professor at Chalmers University of Technology, since 1986.

== See also ==
- List of Danish architects
