= Johannes Paludan =

Danish architect

Johannes Paludan (3 August 1912 in Viborg – 23 April 2002 in Gentofte) was a Danish architect.

== Biography ==
Paludan was the son of a prominent developer in Viborg, and graduated from the Royal Danish Academy of Fine Arts in Copenhagen in 1938 after having completed a degree as a constructor in Århus.

In 1942, during the occupation of Denmark, he established an architectural practice in Virum north of Copenhagen. In the following decades he left a stamp on buildings in contiguously built-up urban areas of Copenhagen. He was behind the highrise blocks on Sorgenfrivang, the single-family houses on Klosterbakken and the renovation of Virum School among others.
