= Svend Albinus =

Danish architect

Svend Albinus (28 August 1901 - 16 February 1995 in Copenhagen) was a Danish architect. From 1930 - 39 he worked at Kaj Gottlob design studio. Albinus received the Neuhausen Prize in 1927 and the Prize of the City of Frederiksberg in 1943. He was the leader of KABS architect department from 1939 to 1954, head of the SBI building research committee from 1954 to 1956 and was then chief architect of the Ministry of Housing from 1956 - 71.

== See also ==
- List of Danish architects
