= Birgit Cold =

Norwegian architect and educator

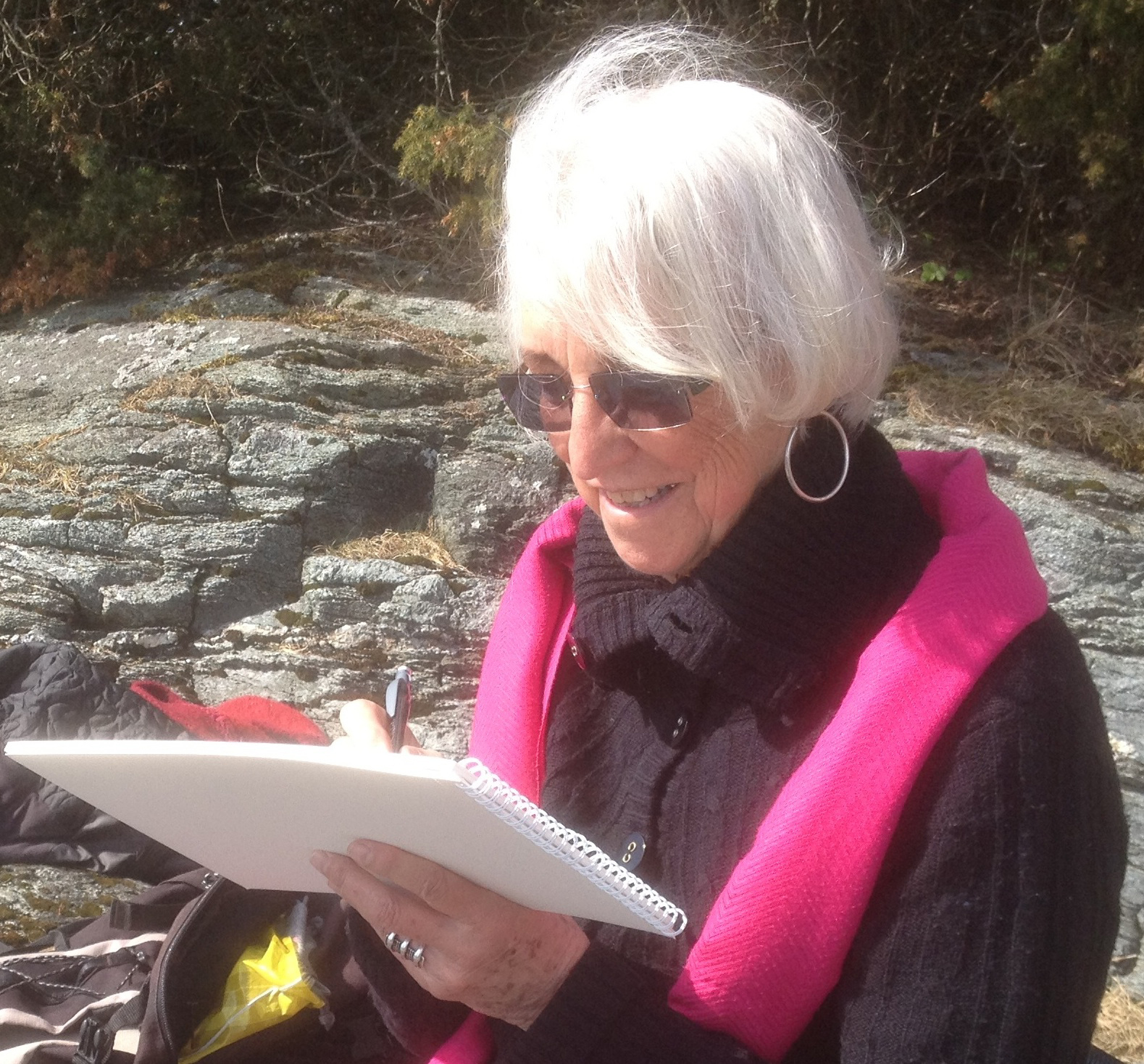
- Born: 8 April 1936; Copenhagen
- Died: December 16, 2022 (aged 86); Trondheim, Norway
- Education: Royal Danish Academy of Fine Arts
- Occupation: Architect
- Spouse: Tore Brantenberg
- Practice: Brantenberg, Cold and Hiorthøy, Norwegian University of Science and Technology

Birgit Cold (8 April 1936 – 16 december 2022) was a Danish-born Norwegian architect and educator. She established her own practice in Trondheim together with Tore Brantenberg and Edvard Hiorthøy in 1964 and became a professor at the Norwegian University of Science and Technology in 1985. Her main areas of interest included the school environment and concern for well-being and health. Cold is also known for her sketching which she often used to express her understanding of architecture.

== Biography ==
Born in Copenhagen on 8 April 1936, Cold studied architecture at Royal Danish Academy of Fine Arts, graduating in 1961. She then spent a period working with the Danish architect and designer Verner Panton. In 1964, she moved to Norway. There, together with her husband Tore Brantenberg and the Norwegian architect Edvard Hiorthøy, she established the architectural firm Brantenberg, Cold and Hiorthøy in Trondheim and ran it until 2000. The firm is known above all for collective housing developments in new residential areas, earning first prize for designing the housing cooperative in Trondheim Risvollan in 1967.

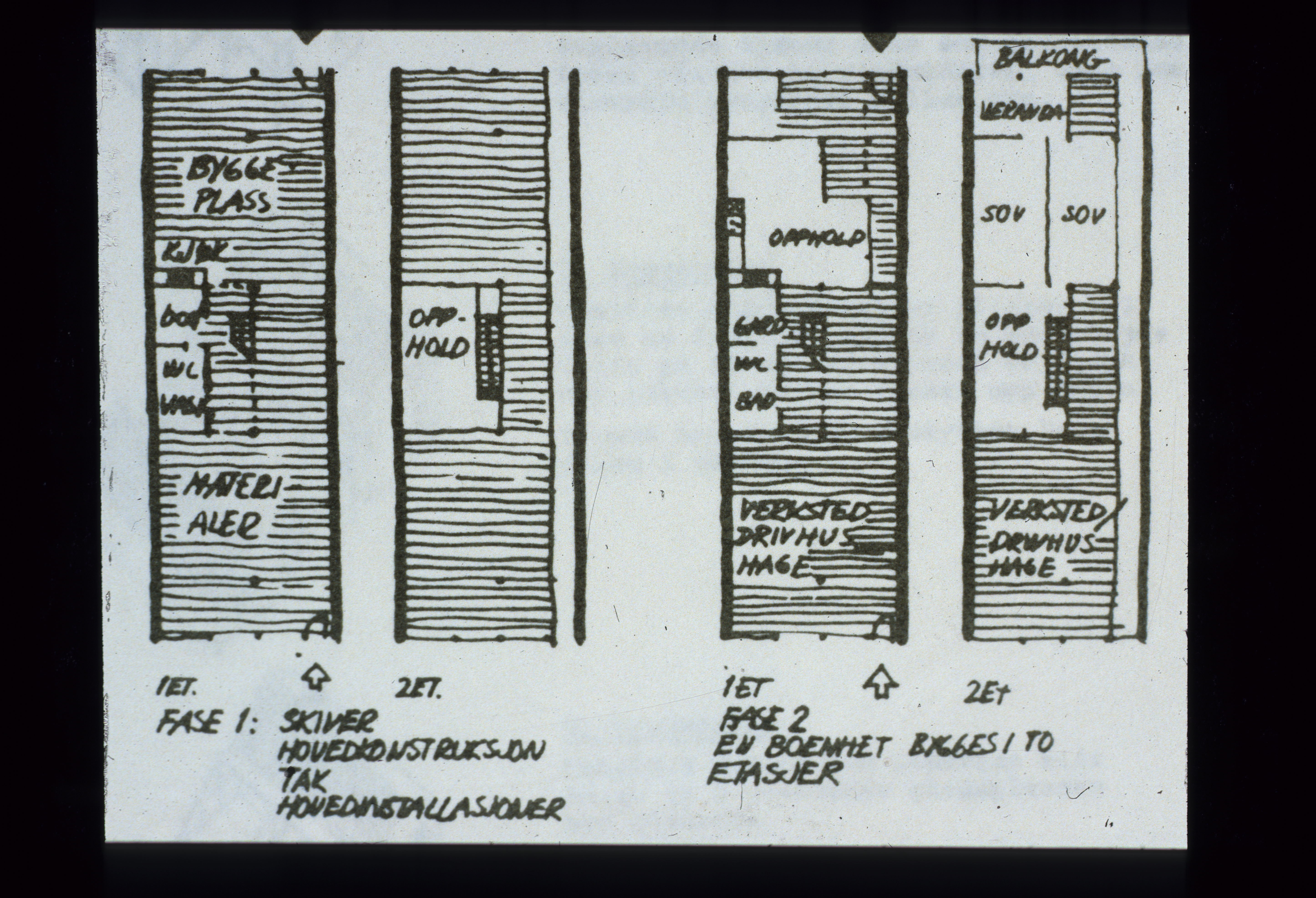
Design for Skiboli (c. 1981)

From 1980 to 2010, she was professor of the Department of Architectural Design and Management at Norwegian University of Science and Technology. She became a member of the university's research team which developed the Skiboli prototype, an experimental attempt at producing energy-saving low-cost housing with high flexibility. A modified version on the university campus is still in use today.

Cold is also known for her sketches, often created with her own architecture project. She also used her sketches as an aid to teaching. In 2008, many were published in her book Skissen som santale (The Sketch for Discussion), published by Tapir Akademisk Forlag.

== Recognition ==
Cold was a member of the Norwegian Academy of Technological Sciences.

== Family ==
Birgit Cold was the daughter of Sigurd Cold and Kirsten Alma Agga. In 1961, she married the architect Tore Brantenberg. The couple have two children.

== Selected publications ==
- Cold, Birgit (1995). Within the humanistic tradition: Six perspectives on quality. Research Magazine / Oslo School of Architecture.
- Cold, Birgit (2001). Aesthetics, Well-being and Health, Essays within architecture and environmental aesthetics. Ashgate. ISBN 0-7546-1856-0.
- Cold, Birgit (2001). On the Aesthetics of Architecture. A Psychological Approach to the Structure and Order of Perceived Architectural Space. Journal of Architectural and Planning Research. vol. 18 (2).
- Cold, Birgit (2008). Skissen som samtale (in Norwegian). Tapir. ISBN 9788251922920.
