= Nord Architects =

Nord Architects Copenhagen, often styled NORD Architects, is an architectural company based in Copenhagen, Denmark.

== History ==
The company was established in 2003 by founding partners Johannes Molander Pedersen (born 1974) and Morten Rask Gregersen (born 1974). In 2015, NORD Architects received the Droga Architect in Residence in Sydney Australia.

== Selected projects ==
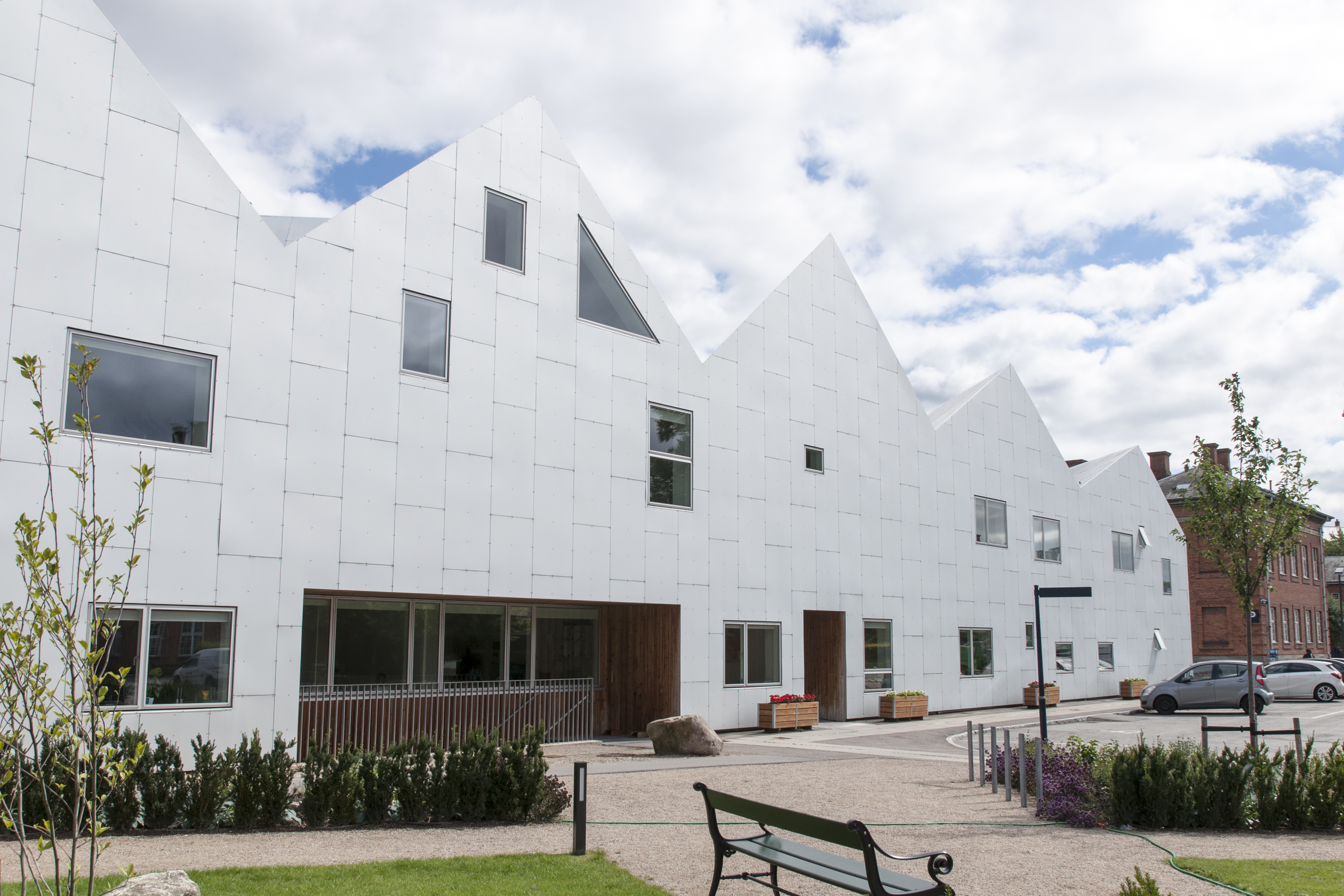
Copenhagen Centre for Cancer and Health

=== Buildings ===
Completed

- Natural Science Center, Bjerringbro, Denmark
- Copenhagen Centre for Cancer and Health, Copenhagen, Denmark
- Urban Hospice, Copenhagen, Denmark

In progress

- Nye Vardheim Healthcare Center(together with 3RW), Randaberg, Norway (2013)
- Marine Educational Centre, Malmö, Sweden (competition win, November 2014)
- European School, Copenhagen, Denmark (competition win, November 2015)
- Alzheimer village, Dax, France (competition win, September 2016)

=== Masterplans ===
- Godsbanen, Aarhus, Denmark
- Tankefuld, Svendborg, Denmark
- Gellerup masterplan, Aarhus, Denmark

=== Urban spaces ===
- Guldbergs Byplads, Copenhagen, Denmark
- BaNanna Park, Copenhagen, Denmark
