= Cornelis Altenau =

Cornelis Altenan (died 19 September 1558) was a Danish-German builder. He was employed by Christian III of Denmark as a bricklayer and carpenter, and was responsible for building the King's fortress in Holstein.

He was also known as the king's architect and helped design Copenhagen Castle shortly before his death. He died on 19 September 1558, when a Flensburg magistrate convicted him in a succession battle between his widow and his daughter Gertrud of his first marriage.
