= Ernst Lohse =

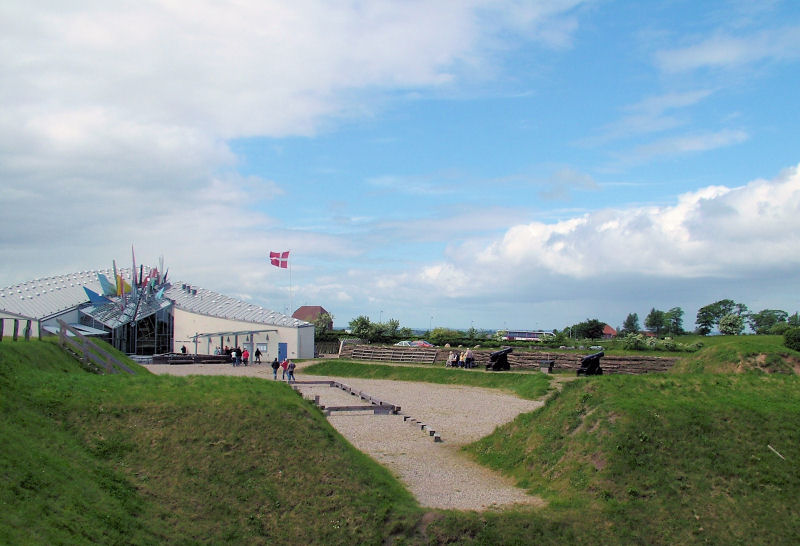
History Centre Dybbøl Banke, Denmark by Ernst Lohse 1992

Ernst Lohse (14 February 1944 – 23 October 1994) was a Danish architect and designer known for his colourful post-modernistic style as well as stylised country and cityscapes of quintessential Danish motifs. Together with architect Bente Schaltz (a.k.a. Bente Lohse) he ran the design studio The Green Studio from 1973 until 1990 (Grønne Studie Aps).

He is especially known for his architectural fantasies – in watercolour – of post-modernistic buildings, often based on mythology. He was also commissioned for architectural design work e.g. poster for Kodak or the yearly poster for DSB – the National Danish Railways. In 1985 he designed a temporary city gate to Copenhagen, which stood at the beginning of the famous pedestrianised shopping street Strøget on the main Copenhagen Town Hall square.

In 1987 he designed a 26 meters long 3D frieze for the central Palace Square for the town of Randers, Denmark (the frieze was restored and rehung in 2013). He also designed posters, postcards, furniture, textiles, jewellery, interior design and theatre scenography (Maria Stuart).

From 1989 until 1992 he designed and built the History Centre Dybbøl together with architect Michael E. Freddie (b. 1946), which was opened by Queen Margrethe II of Denmark 18 April 1992.

His work was commissioned and exhibited in numerous modern art museums, including the Centre Georges Pompidou, Paris, in 1984 and commissioned work for Homo Decorans at the Louisiana Museum of Modern Art, Denmark 1985. Lohse published numerous articles on the topic of architecture (see Publications section below) and with author Mette Winge co-authored the book Hvor smiler fager, a literary guide to Denmark, 1994.
