= Vallerød =

Neighbourhood in Hørsholm, Denmark

Vallerød is a former village and current neighbourhood in Hørsholm, Denmark. It is located in the parishes of Rungsted and Kokkedal. The greenspace Nattergaleengen (literally "The Nightinggale Meadow") separates Vallerød from the Hørsholm neighbourhood.

== History ==
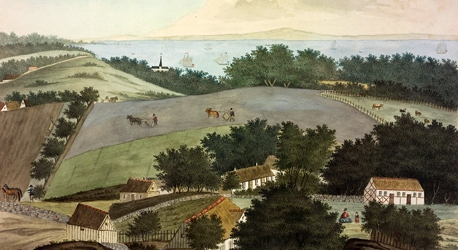
Vallerød's fields painted by in c. 1800

Several large burial mounds were created in the area in the Bronze Age. The village of Vallerød was probably established in a clearing in the vast forest of North Zealand some time during the 13th century. The first known reference to the name is from 1375. In 1800, Vallerød consisted of eight farms.

The Coast Line opened in 1887 and after the turn of the century, several of the farms in Vallerød sold off their land in lots. In 1939, Hørsholm Municipality began to purchase land in the area which was later developed with single family detached homes. The Helsingør Motorway opened in 1958, increasing the demand for housing in the area even more. In 1959, Hørsholm Municipality launched a masterplan competition for the area between Vallerød, Usserød and Hørsholm. It was won by Gerdht Bornebusch, Max Brüel and Jørgen Selchau.

== Landmarks ==
Kirstineparken is a dense-low development from 1960 designed by the architect Jørgen Bo and Vilhelm Wohlert. It consists of 50 terraced houses arranged around a hill with views of Kokkedal Skov. It is registered with a SAVE value of 3. A total of 11 single family detached homes are also registered with a SAVE value of 3: Constantiavej 2A, Constantiavej 6, Louise Petersensvej 1, Højskolevej 11, Højskolevej 12, Højskolevej 14–16, Gl. Vallerødvej 26, Gl. Vallerødvej 28, Gl. Vallerødvej 29, Sanskevej 9B and Sanskevej 15C. Villa Clovelly is from 1920 and was designed by Sven Risom. The public primary school Vallerødskolen is located at Stadionallé 12. Hørsholm Sports Park is also located in the Vallerød area.

== Nattergaleengen ==
In the 1941 Development Plan for Hørsholm, it was decided to maintain greenspaces between the historic centres of the municipality. Nattergaleengen, which separates Vallerød from Hørsholm, creates a green corridor between Folehaven and the Kokkedal estate.
