= Royal Danish Academy of Fine Arts =

Art school in Copenhagen, Denmark

The Royal Danish Academy of Fine Arts - Schools of Architecture, Design and Conservation
- Det Kongelige Danske Kunstakademis Skoler for Arkitektur, Design og Konservering - Arkitektskolen
- Type: Public university
- Established: 1754; 272 years ago
- Rector: Lars Bent
- Students: 200 (2022)
- Location: Copenhagen, Denmark; 55°40′49″N 12°35′14″E
- Campus: Urban
- Website: Schools of Visual Arts of the Royal Danish Academy of Fine Arts

The Royal Danish Academy of Fine Arts (Danish: Det Kongelige Danske Kunstakademi - Billedkunst Skolerne) has provided education in the arts for more than 250 years, playing its part in the development of the art of Denmark.

== History ==
The Royal Danish Academy of Portraiture, Sculpture, and Architecture in Copenhagen was inaugurated on 31 March 1754, and given as a gift to the King Frederik V on his 31st birthday.

Its name was changed to the Royal Danish Academy of Painting, Sculpture, and Architecture in 1771. At the same event, Johann Friedrich Struensee introduced a new scheme in the academy to encourage artisan apprentices to take supplementary classes in drawing so as to develop the notion of "good taste". The building boom resulting from the Great Fire of 1795 greatly profited from this initiative.

In 1814 the name was changed again, this time to the Royal Danish Academy of Fine Arts. It is still situated in its original building, the Charlottenborg Palace, located on the Kongens Nytorv in Copenhagen. The School of Architecture has been situated in former naval buildings on Holmen since 1996.

It teaches and conducts research on the subjects of painting, sculpting, architecture, graphics, photography, performance, and video, as well as in the history of those subjects.

The academy is under the administration of the Danish Ministry of Culture.

The School of Architecture, Design and Conservation is separated from Schools of Visual arts and therefore is a different institution(KADK)

== Institutions ==
- Kunstakademiets Billedkunstskoler, The School of Visual Arts
- Kunstakademiets Arkitektskole, The School of Architecture
- Kunstakademiets Designskole, The School of Design
- Kunstakademiets Konservatorskole, The School of Conservation
- Det Kongelige Akademi for de Skønne Kunster

== Awards ==
- C. F. Hansen Medal
- Thorvaldsen Medal
- Eckersberg Medal
- Thorvald Bindesbøll Medal
- N. L. Høyen Medal

== Notable alumni and faculty ==
The School of Visual Arts

- Carl Bloch
- C. C. A. Christensen
- Lili Elbe
- Olafur Eliasson
- Andreas Emenius
- Caspar David Friedrich (1794–1798)
- Vilhelm Hammershøi (1864-1916)
- Oluf Hartmann
- Jeppe Hein
- Bettina Heinen-Ayech (1937-2020)
- Georg Jensen
- Asger Jorn
- Jane Jin Kaisen
- Karl Kvaran
- Thorald Læssøe
- Johan Ludwig Lund
- Alf Rolfsen (1895-1979)
- Philipp Otto Runge (1799–1801)
- Heidi Maria Schwarck
- Nína Sæmundsson
- Per Johan Svendsen
- Bertel Thorvaldsen

The School of Architecture

- Jan Gehl
- Birgit Cold
- Knud Holscher
- Bjarke Ingels
- Victor Isbrand
- Arne Jacobsen
- Finn Juhl
- Kaare Klint
- Henning Larsen
- Alex Popov
- Steen Eiler Rasmussen
- Verner Panton
- Johann Otto von Spreckelsen
- Magnus Steendorff
- Lene Tranberg
- Jørn Utzon
- Kristian von Bengtson
- Martin Nyrop

== Directors of the Royal Academy schools ==
From	To	Director
1754	1754	Nicolai Eigtved
1754	1771	Jacques-François-Joseph Saly
1771	1772	Carl Gustaf Pilo
1772	1777	Johannes Wiedewelt
1777	1779	Caspar Frederik Harsdorff
1780	1789	Johannes Wiedewelt
1789	1791	Nicolai Abildgaard
1791	1792	Andreas Weidenhaupt
1793	1795	Johannes Wiedewelt
1796	1797	Jens Juel
1797	1799	Peter Meyn
1799	1801	Jens Juel
1801	1809	Nikolaj Abraham Abildgaard
1809	1810	Christian August Lorentzen
1811	1818	Christian Frederik Hansen
1818	1821	Nicolai Dajon
1821	1827	Christian Frederik Hansen
1827	1829	Christoffer Wilhelm Eckersberg
1830	1833	Christian Frederik Hansen
1833	1844	Bertel Thorvaldsen
1844	1849	Jørgen Hansen Koch
1850	1853	Herman Wilhelm Bissen
1854	1857	Wilhelm Marstrand
1857	1863	Jens Adolf Jerichau
1863	1873	Wilhelm Marstrand
1873	1890	Ferdinand Meldahl
1890	1892	Otto Bache
1893	1896	Theobald Stein
1896	1899	Otto Bache
1899	1902	Ferdinand Meldahl
1902	1905	Vilhelm Bissen
1905	1906	Otto Bache
1906	1908	Vilhelm Bissen
1908	1911	Martin Nyrop
1911	1914	Viggo Johansen
1914	1917	Carl Aarsleff
1917	1920	Hermann Baagøe Storck
1920	1825	Joakim Skovgaard
1925	1925	Anton Rosen
1925	1928	Einar Utzon-Frank
1928	1931	Poul Holsøe
1931	1934	Aksel Jørgensen
1934	1937	Einar Utzon-Frank
1937	1940	Poul Holsøe
1940	1943	Sigurd Wandel
1943	1946	Johannes Bjerg
1946	1949	Edvard Thomsen
1949	1952	Kræsten Iversen
1952	1955	Johannes Bjerg
1955	1956	Svend Møller
1956	1965	Palle Suenson
1965	1974	Tobias Faber
1974		Individual directors for the schools

== Gallery ==
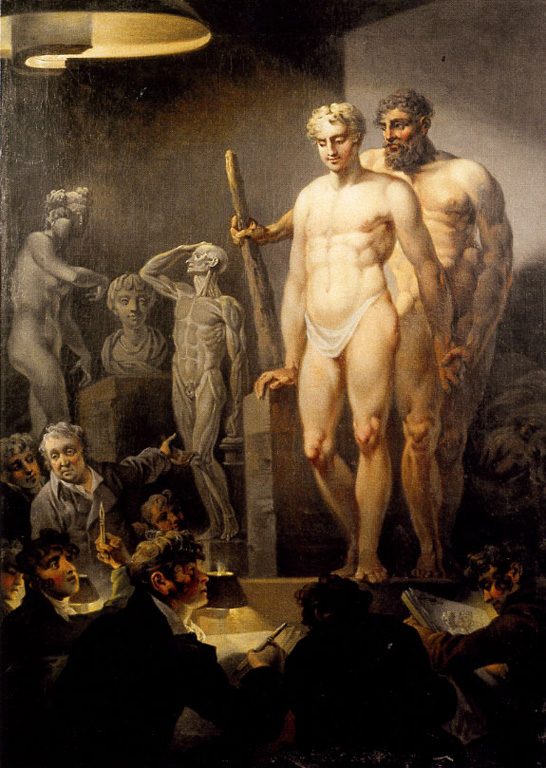
Model Class at the academy c. 1824 (Lorentzen)

Model Class at the academy 1826 (Bendz)

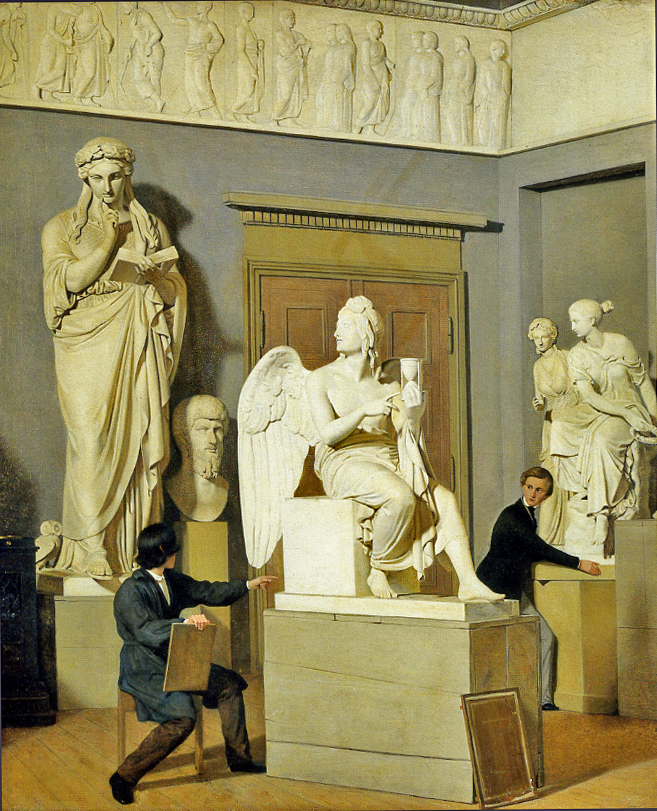
Plaster cast collection 1843 (Exner)

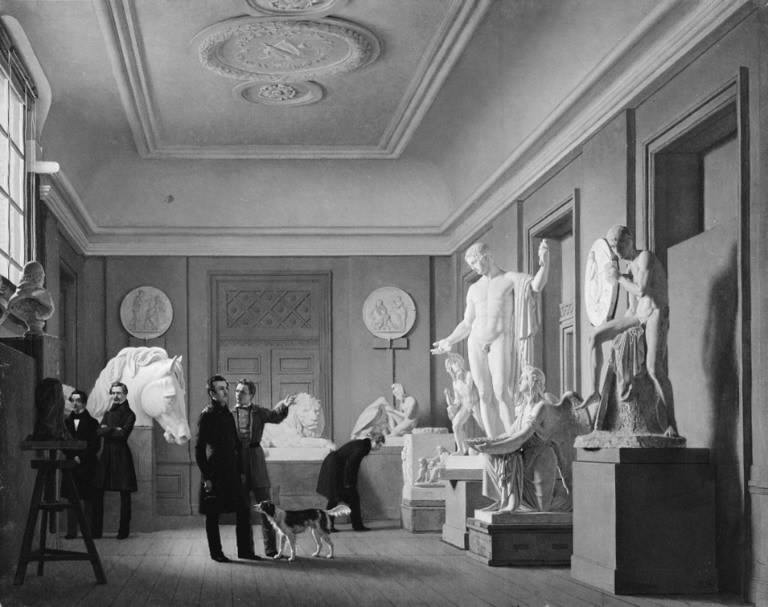
Thorvaldsen's studio at Charlottenborg, painted by Johan Vilhelm Gertner while he was still a student at the academy (1836)

== See also ==
- Architecture of Denmark
- Arne Ranslet
- Danish art
- List of Danish painters
- Open access in Denmark
