= Ulrik Plesner (architect, born 1930) =

Danish architect

- Born: 13 July 1930; Florence, Italy
- Died: 2 June 2016 (aged 85)
- Education: Herlufsholm School
- Occupation: Architect
- Awards: Nykredit Architecture Prize (1987) Eckersberg Medal (1987)

James John Ulrik Plesner (13 July 1930, Florence – 2 June 2016, Tel Aviv) was a Danish architect who has mainly worked abroad, most notably in Sri Lanka and Israel.

== Early life ==
Ulrik Plesner was born in Florence, Italy, the son of a Danish historian and a Scottish painter. He is the grandnephew of Danish architect Ulrik Adolph Plesner. The family moved to Denmark when he was four.

== Career ==
Plesner graduated from Herlufsholm School in 1955 and was employed by Kay Fisker between 1956 – 57.

As a newly qualified architect Plesner won 5 prizes, alone and in collaboration with others. After winning 3rd prize in a competition for a Buddha monument in India and thus gaining a name for himself in Asia, he was invited to Sri Lanka (at the time Ceylon) in 1958 and stayed there till 1967. He first worked for Sri Lankan architect Minnette de Silva and then was made partner in Geoffrey Bawa's studio in Colombo. Together they built Ekala Industrial Estate, Good Shepherd Chapel Bandarawela, Polontolawa house, St. Thomas Preparatory School, and many other buildings, mainly schools, factories, private houses and hotels. The buildings bear witness to an understanding of the local building traditions and the tropical climate while using modern building techniques.

In 1967 he went to London, where he was at Arup Associates until 1972. At Arup Plesner was responsible for the Oxford Mail and Times 'building, Kensington and Chelsea New Central Depot and Housing and was architectural consultant on highway bridges. 1972 he moved to Israel and established his own office in Jerusalem in the same year. Plesner was city architect in Jerusalem 1976 – 77, where he worked on a new urban plan, and architect of the World Bank 1980 – 87. He has designed Bet Gabriel cultural centre, adopting elements of the regional building traditions. For a short period, he moved his studio to Copenhagen in 1987 and joined forces with Dan Wajnman. In the competition for Copenhagen harbor, he attended 1985 with an acclaimed project. His most important work in Denmark is the Slotsarkaderne shopping mall in Hillerød.

From 1972 until his death, he lived in Tel Aviv and ran an architectural firm, Plesner Architects, with his two daughters, architects Daniela Plesner and Maya Plesner.

== Awards ==
Ulrik Plesner has received the Jerusalem Prize for Architecture 1982, Margot and Thorvald Dreyer's Honorary Award 1985, Nykredit Architecture Prize and Eckersberg Medal in 1987. In 2011, he was awarded the C.F. Hansen Medal.

== Private life ==
Plesner was married on 7 January 1966 in Colombo, Sri Lanka, to Israeli journalist and lecturer Tamar Liebes, born on 28 September 1943 in Jerusalem to classical philologist, professor at the Hebrew University of Jerusalem, Joseph Gerhard Julius Liebes (1910–1988) and ceramicist Miriam Leibowitz. Their son, Yohanan Plesner, is an Israeli political scientist and former politician who served in the Knesset between 2007 and 2013. Their two daughters, Daniela and Maya Plesner, both graduated the Bezalel Academy of Architecture (in 1994 and 1997 respectively), and continue leading, and working at, the Tel Aviv architecture firm founded by their father in 1972.

== Works ==
=== Written work ===
- Articles on architecture and planning architect, 1957–78.
- The Port of Copenhagen's future in politics 17 January 1982; 9 June 1984; 16 June 1984; 23 June 1984; 30 June 1984 and June–July 1987th
- In Situ. An architectural memoir from Sri Lanka. An autobiography published in Denmark in 2013 in both English and Danish. Aristo Publishing, 451 pages, illustrated.
