= Henning Larsen =

Danish architect (1925–2013)

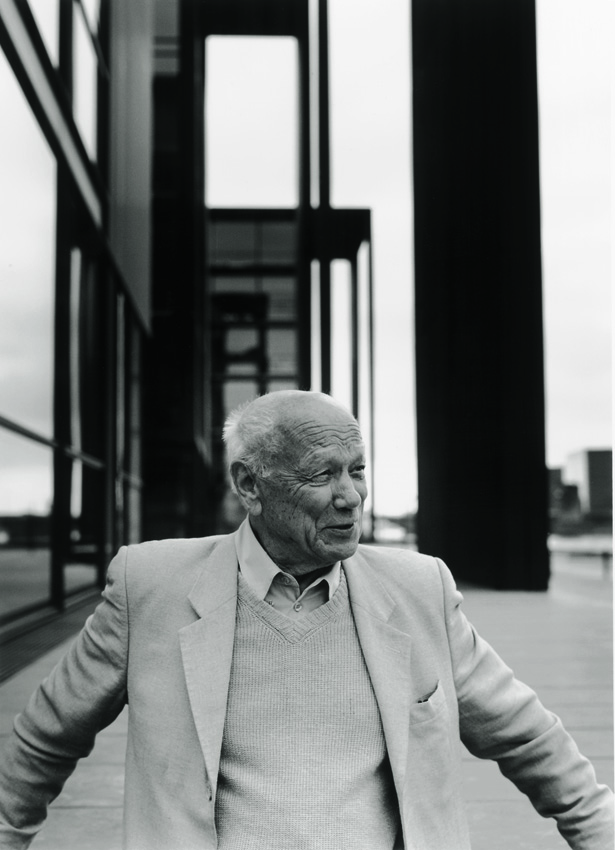
- Henning Larsen, 2012
- Born: 20 August 1925; Opsund, Denmark
- Died: 22 June 2013 (aged 87); Copenhagen, Denmark
- Education: Royal Danish Academy of Fine Arts
- Occupation: Architect
- Awards: Praemium Imperiale
- Practice: Henning Larsen Architects
- Buildings: Ministry of Foreign Affairs (Saudi Arabia)

Henning Larsen Hon. FAIA (20 August 1925 – 22 June 2013) was a Danish architect. He is internationally known for the Ministry of Foreign Affairs building in Riyadh and the Copenhagen Opera House.

Larsen studied at the Royal Danish Academy of Fine Arts, from which he graduated in 1952. He continued studies subsequently at the Architectural Association School of Architecture and the Massachusetts Institute of Technology. His mentors included Arne Jacobsen and Jørn Utzon.

Larsen founded an architectural firm that bears his name, Henning Larsen Architects (formerly Henning Larsens Tegnestue A/S). From 1968 to 1995, he was a professor of architecture at the Royal Danish Academy of Fine Arts. In 1985, he established the SKALA architecture gallery and the parallel SKALA architecture journal, both entities of which continued until 1994.

== Buildings ==
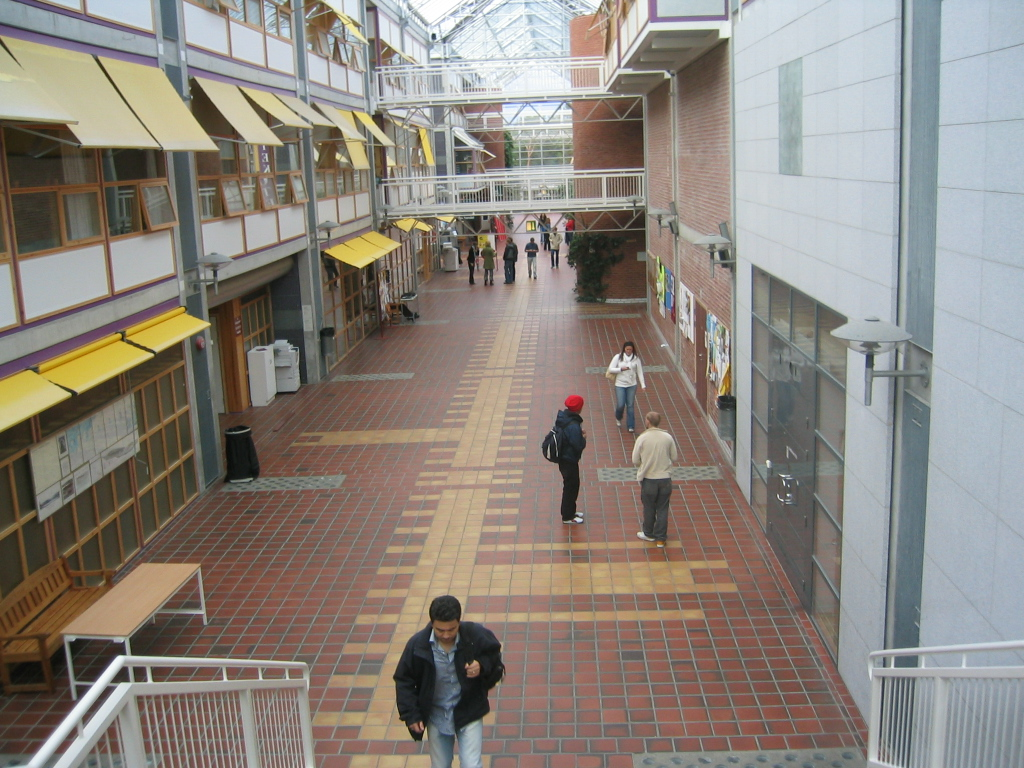
The campus center in Dragvoll

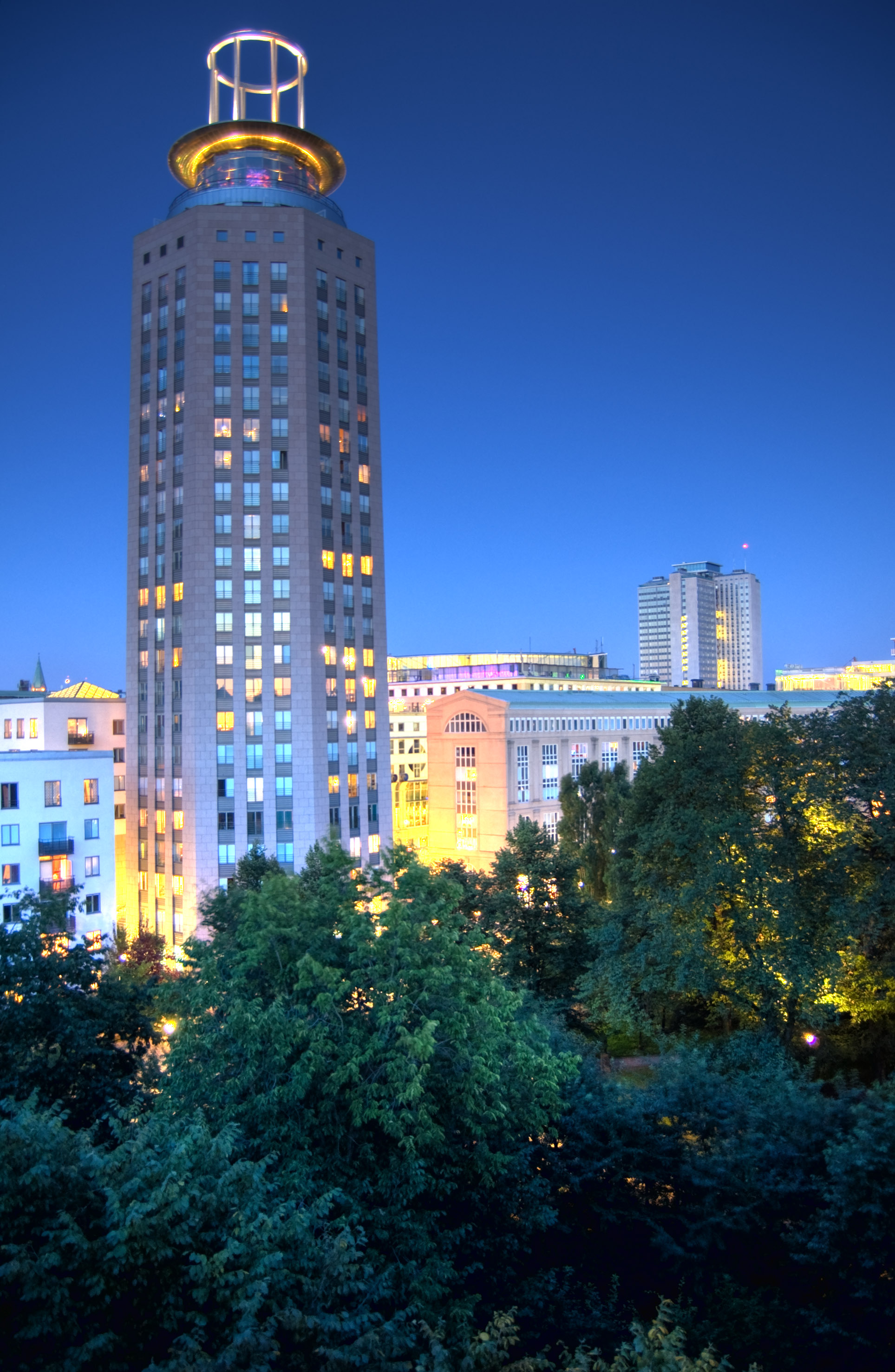
Söder Torn, an 86-meter-tall building near Medborgarplatsen. Built in 1997, designed by Henning Larsen.

- 1968 The campus center in Dragvoll at the Norwegian University of Science and Technology, Trondheim
- 1979 The Danish embassy, Riyadh
- 1982–87 Commercial college and residences, Frederiksberg
- 1982–84 Ministry of foreign affairs, Riyadh
- 1984–85 Gentofte library
- 1992 The Møller Centre for Continuing Education, Churchill College, Cambridge
- 1997 Extension of Ny Carlsberg Glyptotek
- 1995 Egebjerggård, Ballerup
- 1994–1999 Extension of Malmö City Library
- 1999 Head office of Nordea, Copenhagen
- 2004 Copenhagen Opera House
- 2004 IT University of Copenhagen
- 2007 Musikens Hus (The house of music), Uppsala, Sweden
- 2004–2007 The Roland Levinsky Building as part of Plymouth University, England
- 2008–2011 Der Spiegel headquarters, HafenCity, Hamburg, Germany
- 2008-2011 Harpa (Concert hall and conference center), Reykjavík, Iceland

== Distinctions ==
- 1965 Eckersberg Medal
- 1981 Norwegian Concrete Award for Excellent Building, for the Dragvoll complex in Trondheim
- 1985 Honorary member of the American Institute of Architects
- 1985 C.F. Hansen Medal
- 1986 Prince Eugen Medal
- 1987 The Daylight and Building Component Award
- 1987 Nykredit Architecture Prize
- 1987 International Design Award, United Kingdom
- 1989 Aga Khan Award for the Ministry of Foreign Affairs in Riyadh
- 1991 Honorary member of the Royal Institute of British Architects
- 1997 Kasper Salin Prize, Sweden
- 1999 Dreyer Honorary Award
- 2001 Stockholm Award
- 2012 Praemium Imperiale
