= Nykredit Architecture Prize =

Danish architecture prize

The Nykredit Architecture Prize is the largest Danish architecture prize. Founded by the Nykredit Foundation (an arm of the Nykredit Group), it is awarded annually to a person, or group of people, who have personally, or through their work, made a significant contribution to the building industry in the form of architecture or planning, etc. The recipient receives DKK 500,000, making it one of the largest architecture prizes in the world in terms of prize money.

In 1991 the Nykredit Foundation began awarding the Motivational Award/Encouragement Prize to talented young architects who have made an impact on the architecture scene.

== Recipients ==
Year	Recipient(s)
1987	Henning Larsen; Jørn Utzon; Ulrik Plesner
1988	Johan Otto von Spreckelsen; Erik Reitzel (engineer); 3XN; Carsten Hoff; Susanne Ussing
1989	Sys Hartmann (art historian); Poul Ingemann; Erik Einar Holm; Tegnestuen Kvisten
1990	Tegnestuen Vandkunsten; Arkitektgruppen Århus
1991	Ib and Jørgen Rasmussen; Inger and Johannes Exner; Klaus Eggers Hansen (editor)
1992	Erik Christian Sørensen; KHR Arkitekter; Mogens Brandt Poulsen
1993	Tegnestruen Jørgen og Inge Vesterholt; Torben Schønherr (landscape); Jeppe Aagaard Andersen (landscape)
1994	Troels Hasner; Ole Justesen
1995	Boje Lundgaard
1996	Søren Robert Lund
1997	Schmidt Hammer Lassen
1998	DOMUS arkitekter
1999	Dissing+Weitling
2000	Knud Friis; Gehrdt Bornebusch; Vilhelm Wohlert
2001	Sven-Ingvar Andersson (landscape)
2002	Julien De Smedt; Bjarke Ingels
2003	Malene Hauxner (landscape)
2004	Olafur Eliasson (visual artist)
2005	Lene Tranberg
2006	C. F. Møller Architects
2007	Dorte Mandrup
2008	CEBRA
2009	Entasis
2010	Stig Lennart Andersson
2011	CUBO
2012	COBE
2013	Gehl Architects
2014	Kristine Jensens Tegnestue
2015	Gottlieb Paludan Architects
2016	Carsten Engtoft Holgaard
2017	Praksis Arkitekter
2018	Bjarke Ingels, Sheela Maini Søgaard, Finn Nørkjær, Andreas Klok Pedersen, Jakob Lange, Thomas Christoffersen, Ole Elkjær-Larsen, David Zahle, Cat Huang, Brian Yang, Jakob Sand, Kai-Uwe Bergmann, Martin Voelkle, Leon Rost, Agustin Perez Torrez, Beat Schenk and Daniel Sundlin (Bjarke Ingels Group)

== Motivational Award ==
- 2015: Cornelius+Vöge
- 2014: Svendborg Architects
- 2013: Effekt
- 2012: Powerhouse Company
- 2011: JAJA Architects
- 2010: Mette Lange
- 2009: Polyform
- 2008: ONV Arkitekter
- 2007: Dan Stubbergaard
- 2006: TRANSFORM/Lars Bendrup

== Encouragement Prize ==
- 2005: NORD Arkitekter
- 2004: Henrik Valeur
- 2003: Kollision/Andreas Lykke-Olesen, Rune Nielsen and Tobias Løssing
- 2002: Hanne Birk and Merete Lind Mikkelsen
- 2001: Christina Capetillo
- 2000: Sergio George Fox
- 1999: Hotel Proforma
- 1998: Arkitekturtidsskrift B
- 1997: Jens Lindhe
- 1996: Inge Mette Kirkeby
- 1995: Pluskontoret
- 1994: none awarded
- 1993: Kristine Jensen, Otto Käszner and Jens Rørbech
- 1992: Merete Ahnfeldt-Mollerup and Thomas Wiesner
- 1991: Suzanne Eben Ditlevsen

== See also ==
- Architecture of Denmark
- C. F. Hansen Medal
