= Getama =

Danish furniture company

Getama was a furniture company based in Gedsted, Denmark.

Getama's administration building and production hall were completely burned down on 9 February 2024 and the company was sold to Danish furniture firm Carl Hansen & Son.

== History ==
The company was founded in 1899 as Gedsted Tang- og Madratsfabrik when the young carpenter Carl Pedersen started a production of seaweed mattresses in his home town. The seaweed harvested in the Limfjord was also sold to other companies. The company moved into furniture production in 1910. In 1949, it launched a collaboration with Hans Wegner. The furniture factory grew to become the largest employer in the small town of Gedsted with a work force of around 100. The name of the company was changed to Getama in 1953.

== Designers ==
Getama produced furniture designed by designers such as Hans Wegner, Nanna Ditzel and Mogens Koch.
