= Dreyers Fond =

Danish foundation

- Founded: 1976
- Type: charity
- Location: Copenhagen, Denmark
- Region served: Denmark
- Website: www.dreyersfond.dk

Dreyers Fond (English: The Dreyer Foundation) is a Copenhagen-based Danish foundation founded by husband and wife Thorvald and Margot Dreyer in 1976. Thorvald was an architect, and Margot was a lawyer. The foundation supports projects and activities aimed at promoting the development of the architects' and lawyers' professions, and their interaction with society. The annual Dreyer Honorary Award honors excellence in architecture as well as law. The foundation is also active in the market for real estate investments.

== Real estate portfolio ==
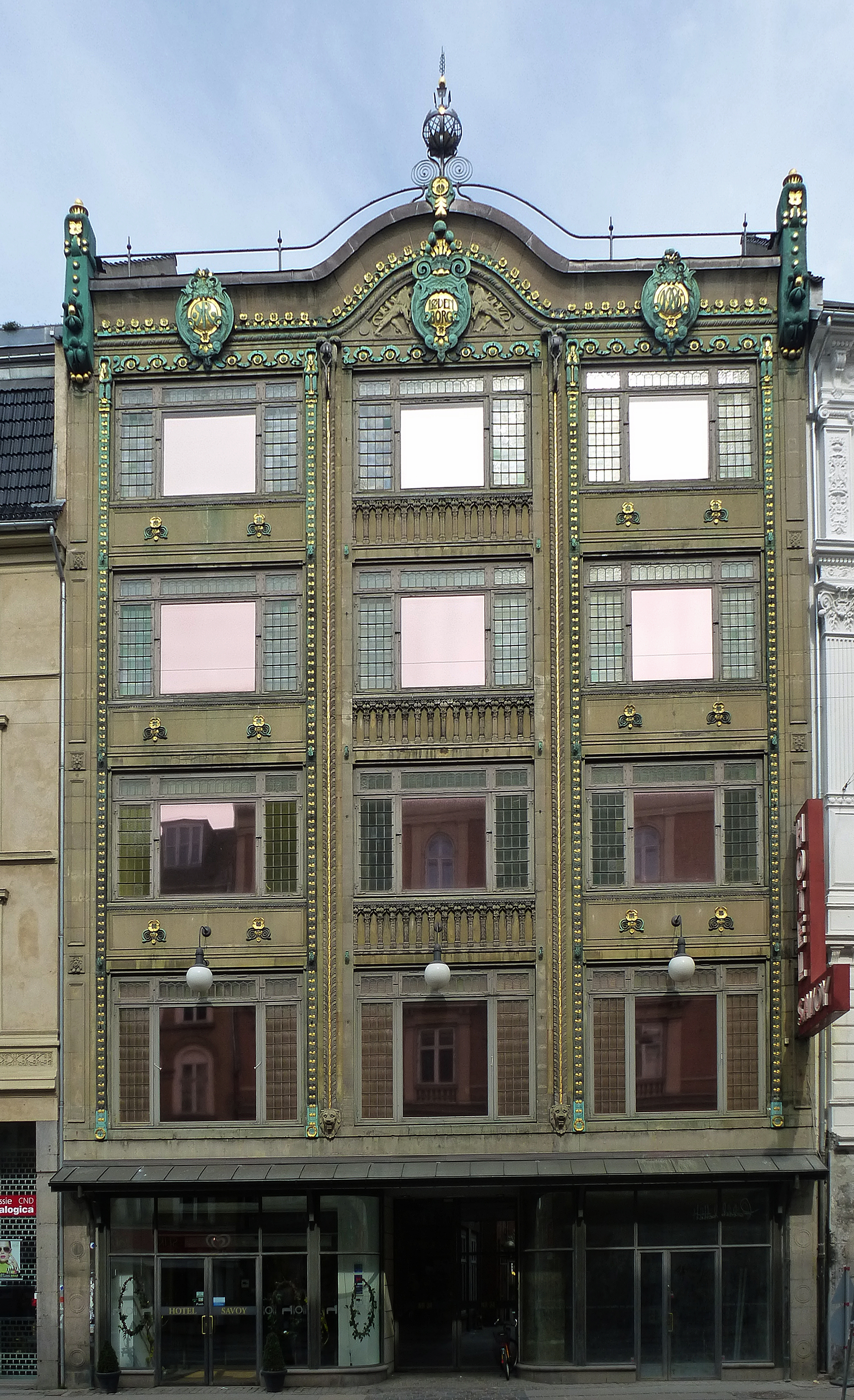
Løvenborg

=== Løvenborg ===
Dreyers Fond is based in the Løvenborg building on Vesterbrogade in Copenhagen. The building is from 1906 and was designed by Anton Rosen. Dreyers Fond acquired the building in 2000 and subsequently undertook a renovation which received the Europa Nostra Award in 2004.

=== Vesterbrogade 32: Valencia Building ===
In September 2012, Dreyers Fond acquired the building at Vesterbrogade 32 in the Vesterbro district of Copenhagen. It first opened in 1858 to a design by H. S. Stilling under the name Thors Ølhal, and later developed into the largest cabaret in the Nordic region under the name Valencia. The complex has been renovated by Dorte Mandrup Architects and now houses the Association of Danish Law Firms.

=== Højbro Plads 3: Warburg House ===
In October 2012, Dreyers Fond acquired the listed Warburg House on Højbro Plads in central Copenhagen. It contains the coffee chain Baresso's first coffee bar. Other tenants include Toga Vinstue and a cocktail bar.

=== Fælledvej 19 ===
In 2014, Dreyers Fond acquired two buildings on Fælledvej at No. 19 in the Nørrebro district of Copenhagen - a residential building on the street dating from 1858, and an industrial building from 1908 in the courtyard. In 2015, Holscher Nordberg Architects completed a renovation of the industrial building, which now contains six apartments.

== Dreyer Honorary Award recipients ==
=== Architecture ===
Year	Recipient	Motivation
2024	Building Diversity	for their commitment to increase diversity in the built environment
2016	Praksis Arkitekter	for elaborate works that produce urban place bound architecture with concern to traditions
2016	Kristine Jensen	
2015	Dan Stubbergaard	for the studio's ability to embrace the city's daily life in unpretentious and animating frames
2014	Frank Maali and Gemma Lalanda	for their empathetic and imaginative transformations of historic buildings and urban spaces
2012	Marianne Levinsen	for her poetic and empathetic works with landscape and urban space
2011	Bjarke Ingels	for his dauntless and surprising way of thinking how to build and live
2010	Helle Søholt and Jan Gehl, Gehl Architects	for the couple's compelling way to bring focus on the human dimension of urban planning worldwide, with the slogan: Cities for people
2009	Richard Leplastrier	for his genuine understanding of the true meaning of sustainability, based on a philosophy best summed up by the motto: "Let’s cultivate less!"
2008	Steen Høyer	for his inspiring work in developing the art of landscaping and establishing overall quality settings for a sustainable development of open land
2007	Erik Christian Sørensen	for his lifelong contribution to architecture and his unique work as an instructor and professor at the School of Architecture
2006	Jørn Utzon	because he managed through his way of working with architecture to clarify the connection between inspiration, ideas, creation and work in such way so he will always be an educative and inspiring role model for others
2005	Signe and Christian Cold, Entasis	for its sensitive and calculated completion of its projects that are carried out with brilliance, magic, unusually high quality and great awareness of architectural methods
2003	Stig Lennart Andersson	for unusual sensitivity, discipline and respect for details and materials
2003	Dorte Mandrup	for her ability to maturely, originally and independently interpret time
2002	Lene Tranberg and Boje Lundgaard	for their significant artistic work on many beautiful buildings in a very broad spectrum
2001	Knud Holscher	for his talent for styling, from overall planning and architecture, to design
2001	Nils-Ole Lund	for his way of engaging in questions surrounding architecture and for being one of the principal organizers in the establishment of the Århus School of Architecture
2001	Marianne Ingvartsen	for her engagement in teaching and practical work and competitions within urban renewal and housing
2001	Jens Fredslund	for his considerate and high quality work with the restoration of buildings
2001	Knud Fladeland	for his talented architecture work in many competitions with forward-looking and promising results
1999	Henning Larsen	for his ability to create outstanding architecture that brings greater experiences than the assignments require
1998	David Bretton-Meyer	for his significant contribution to raise the consideration to care and respect of our architectural heritage, including his restoration of neoclassical buildings such as for example the University Copenhagen
1997	Knud Friis and Elmer Moltke	for a thorough approach to strength and quality regardless of the task or the budget – as well as the skill, professionalism and architectural nerve that supports the quality
1995	Tobias Faber	for his importance to Danish architecture and for the quality of education within architecture and the development of the discipline
1992	Mogens Koch	for demonstrating a level of quality that has been of enormous importance for Danish industrial design throughout his long life. The honorary award is a portrait bust for “Kuppelsalen” in Charlottenborg made by sculptor Knud Nellemose
1989	The architecture prize was given to a publication about architect Johan Otto Spreckelsen’s structure La Grande Arche de la Défence in Paris.	
1988	Hanne Kjærholm	for her high level of quality and individuality as well as her alignment of continuity and modernity
1985	Ulrik Plesner	for his contributions as an architect and a teacher outside Denmark. in Sri Lanka and Israel
1984	Johan Fog and Per Følner	for the Wasa project in Stockholm
1982	Vilhelm Wohlert	for his restoration of Copenhagen's Cathedral
