= Mogens Koch =

Danish architect and furniture designer (1898–1992)

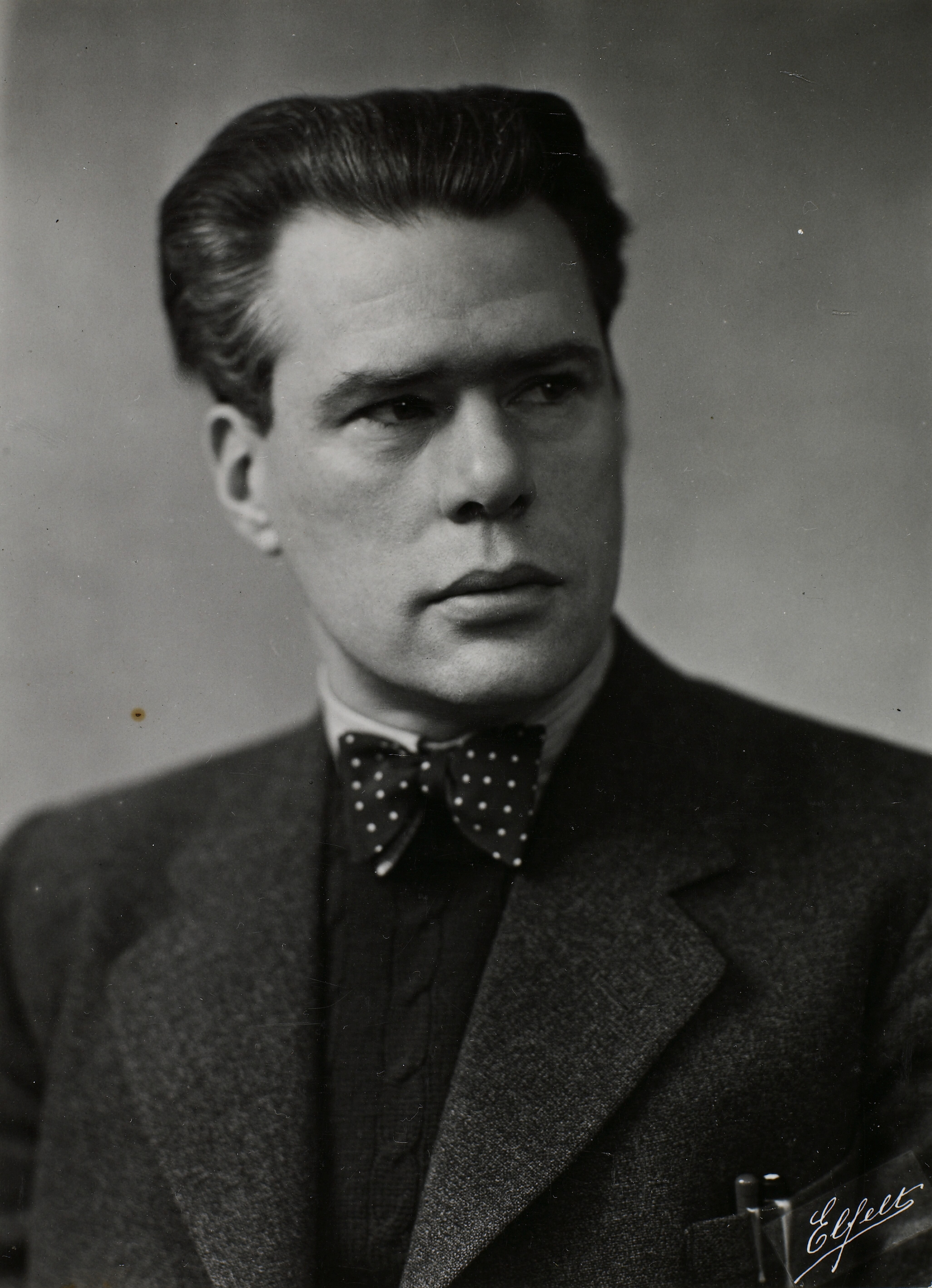
- Born: 2 March 1898; Frederiksberg, Denmark
- Died: 16 September 1992 (aged 94); Copenhagen, Denmark
- Occupation: Architect
- Awards: Eckersberg Medal (1938), C. F. Hansen Medal (1963)

Mogens Koch (2 March 1898 – 16 September 1992) was a Danish architect and furniture designer and, from 1950 to 1968, a professor at the Royal Danish Academy of Fine Arts.

== Early life and education ==
Mogens Koch was born in the Frederiksberg district of Copenhagen. He attended the architecture school at the Royal Danish Academy of Fine Arts in Copenhagen, and between 1925 and 1932 worked for Carl Petersen, Ivar Bentsen and Kaare Klint, where he was trained in the Danish functional tradition.

== Career and designs ==
As a furniture designer Mogens Koch is known for the Folding Chair (1932), the Wing Chair No. 50 and the Armchair No. 51 in mahogany and leather (1936) and the Book Case (1928).

Prior to teaching at the Royal Academy, Koch had the good fortune to be a student of noted architect and Professor Kaare Klint. Klint challenged Koch to draw everlasting designs; not only furniture architect, but also in the designing of monuments, buildings, textiles and silverware. Klint was obviously impressed with Mogens Koch talent as a student, and after Koch graduated he went on to be employed at Carl Petersen, Ivar Bentsen and Kaare Klint architect studio. Koch worked at this studio from 1925 until 1932. It was here where he learned to work with the principles behind the Danish functionalism tradition.

The furniture designed by Mogens Koch is some of the most elegant and practical solutions to the demands of comfort, functionality and aesthetics. Koch's designs have been the central feature of the Rud Rasmussen Company since 1932, and many of his furniture designs are still in production today. In 1934 Koch opened his own studio.

Like Klint, Koch often used previous generations experience in furniture design and implemented these experiences into his own designs. Some of Koch's best known works include the extension of the Royal Veterinary and Agricultural University in Frederiksberg. This was a joint project with Steen Eiler Rasmussen. Koch's released a highly successful sectional bookcase in 1928. A ‘Folding Chair’ which was designed in 1933, but was not manufactured until 1959, yet is still being manufactured today. Koch is also known for renovation of churches.

Mogens Koch's professional direction changed a little in the 1950s, and he began spending much of his time renovating churches and other buildings. He was involved in converting the former Frederiks Hospital in Copenhagen for use by the Danish Museum of Art & Design.

Koch's most famous piece of furniture is the square book case which was designed for his own home in 1928. It has a particularly flexible, space saving designed, and it was adjustable for the book formats of the future. Like Kaare Klint, Mogens Koch spent much time studying mathematics and human proportions as well as studying historical furniture items to help his own designs. Koch's practical and natural furniture is usually made of indestructible maintenance free materials. Mogens Koch is one of the few Danish architects who have completely succeeded in implementing Kaare Klint's teachings of functionalism.

Morgens Koch was awarded the Eckersberg Medal in 1938 and C. F. Hansen Medal in 1963. he was awarded the Cabinet-Makers’ Guild annual prize in 1964 and the Danish Furniture Manufacturers Association's Furniture Award in 1982.

== Personal life ==
In 1927, he married Danish weaver Edel “Ea” Varming (1905-1987). Morgens Koch died in 1992.

== Legacy ==
Mogens Koch's design legacy is today owned by Mogens Koch Design. Mogens Koch furniture was for many years produced by Carl Hansen & Søn. In 2020, Mogens Koch Design launched a new collaboration with Getama.

=== Notable designs ===
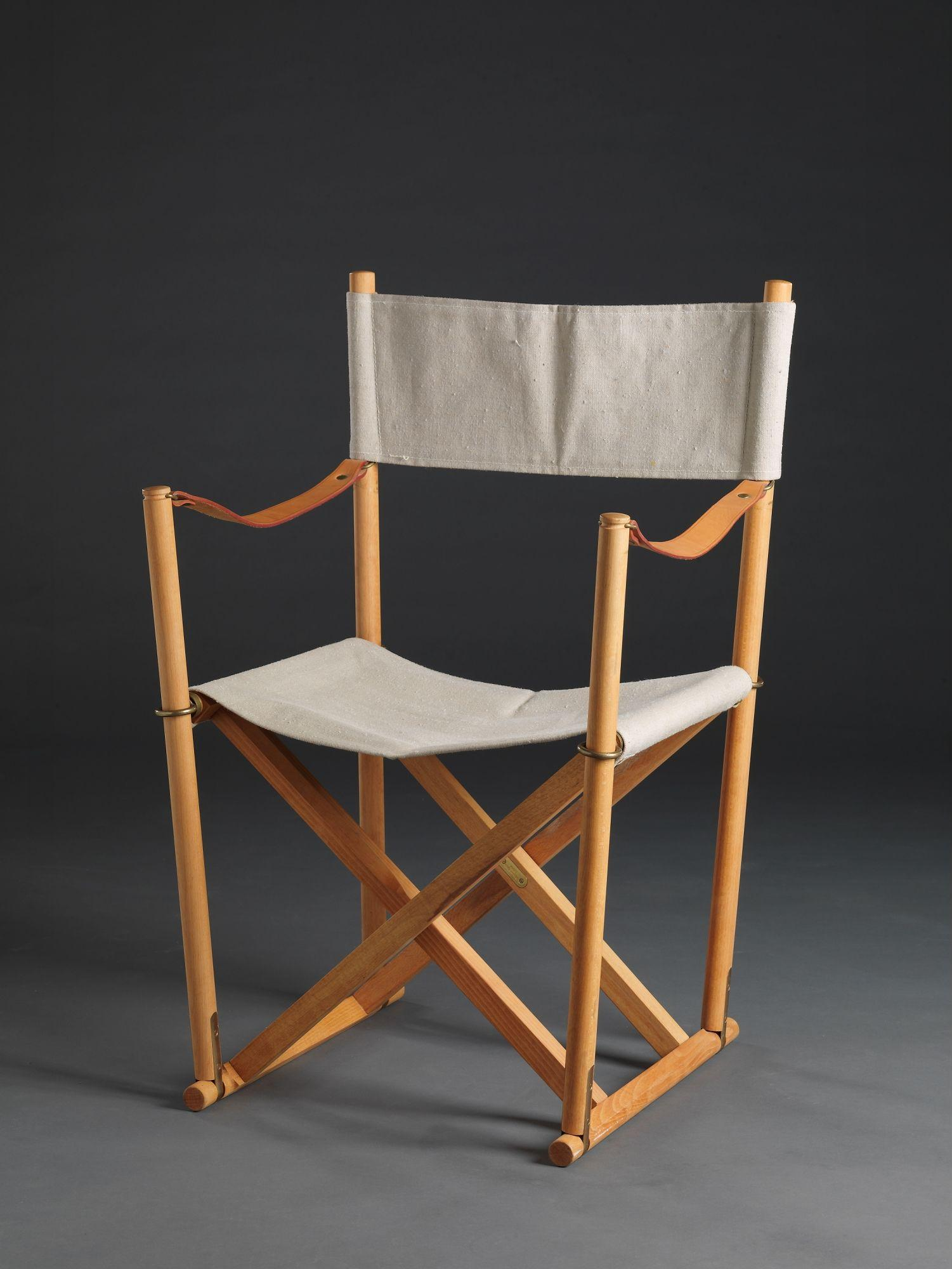
MK-16 folding chair for Carl Hansen & Søn

- MK-9 Yin Yang tabke
- MK-16 folding chair
- MK-76 stativ til 6 foldestole;
- MK-23 Embassy table
- MK-30 folding stool
- MK-48 tray

== Awards ==
- 1938 Eckersberg Medal
- 1963 C. F. Hansen Medal
- 1990 Danish Design Center's Classic Award
- 1990 Denmark's National Bank's Anniversary Award
- 1992 Dreyer Honorary Award
