= CEBRA =

Danish architecture firm

- Type: Architectural office
- Founded: 2001
- Founder: Mikkel Frost, Carsten Primdahl, Kolja Nielsen
- Headquarters: Aarhus, Denmark,
- Services: Building design, landscape design, interior design, urban planning, transformation, new construction, circularity strategies, strategies for sustainable design management, low-emission architecture
- Number of employees: 65+
- Website: https://cebra.dk/

CEBRA is a Danish architectural office founded in 2001 by architects Mikkel Frost, Carsten Primdahl, and Kolja Nielsen, who head the studio's creative work and strategic development with partner Mikkel Schlesinger. The studio maintains a solid international portfolio, including projects across Scandinavia, Europe, the Middle East, and North America and has received several national and international awards for its work in various countries.

The multidisciplinary studio is recognised for combining artistic ambition with contextual understanding and sensory design approaches. Their work spans a broad range of architectural typologies and scales, with particular emphasis on how architectural expression influences well-being, cultural interaction, and long-term adaptability. CEBRA's design approach combines its aesthetic commitment with research-informed methods to support learning environments, reduce environmental impact, and reinforce architecture as an evolving art form.

In 2025, CEBRA's European positioning and international profile earned a merger with Canadian architecture firm, Lemay. Being part of Lemay Group, CEBRA expand its international network while maintaining its own identity, leadership, and strategic focus and existing markets, including Denmark.

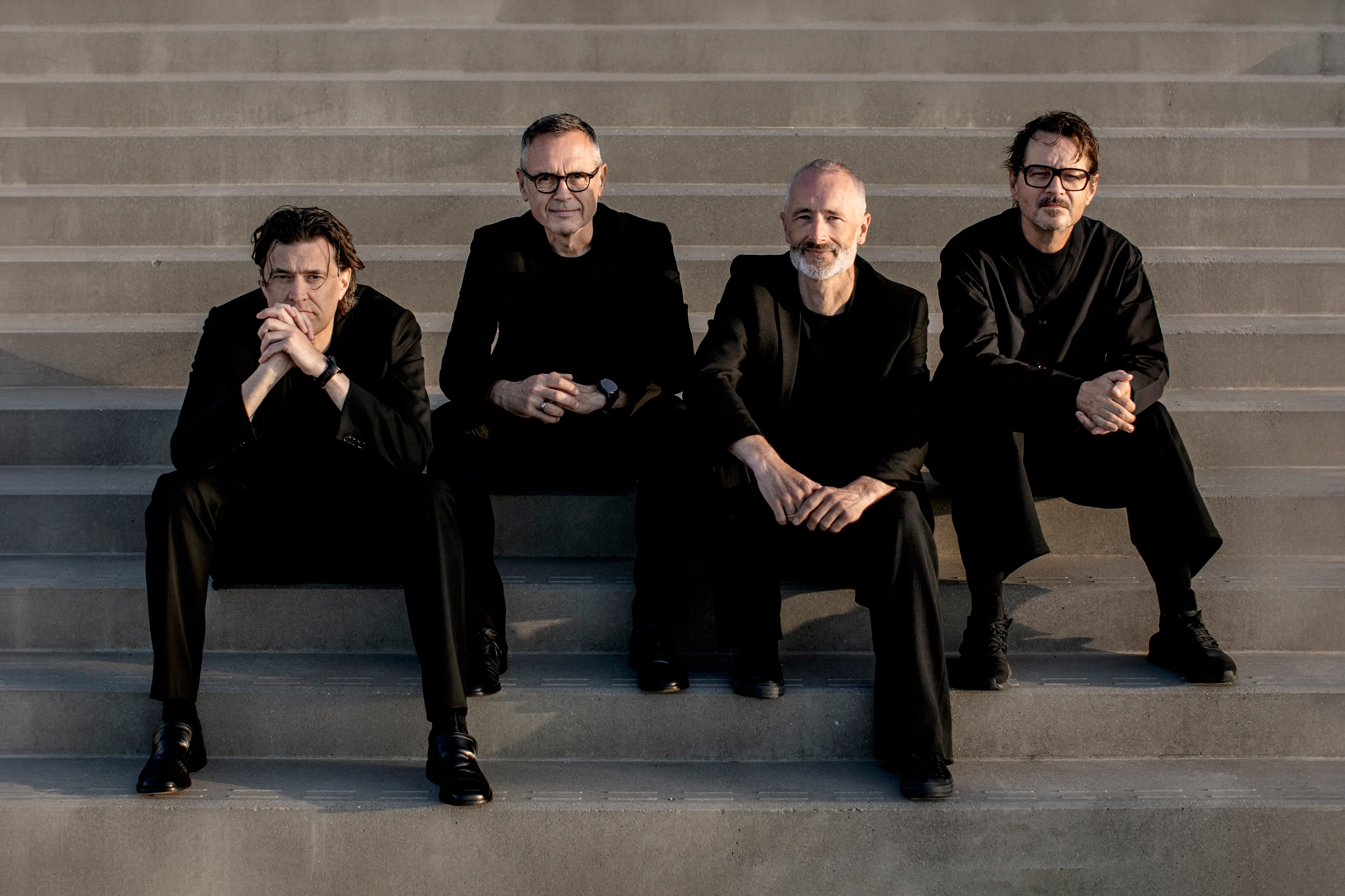
Partners, CEBRA

== History ==
Mikkel Frost, Carsten Primdahl, and Kolja Nielsen met while studying architecture at the Aarhus School of Architecture, where they collaborated on academic projects and developed a lasting creative partnership. All three graduated with a Master of Architecture (M.Arch) in 1996 from Aarhus School of Architecture.

Following graduation, Frost and Nielsen worked at Schmidt Hammer Lassen Architects, while Primdahl joined Arkitema. Despite pursuing individual careers, they stayed in close contact and continued to discuss the idea of starting their own studio.

In 2001, the three co-founded CEBRA in Aarhus. The studio's early years were shaped by their shared experience, close collaboration, and a desire to establish an alternative to the conventional architecture firm.

Architect Mikkel Hallundbæk Schlesinger, who earned his M.Arch in 1999, joined CEBRA from 3XN early on and was the first hire of the studio. Schlesinger became a partner in 2017 following his commitment to the firm and his efforts in the establishment of a branch office in Abu Dhabi in 2015, leading e.g. the Al Hosn master plan project.

== Architectural works ==
=== The Iceberg ===
The Iceberg, situated on the outer harbour front of Aarhus' Aarhus Ø district, is a residential project completed between 2008 and 2015, featuring 208 apartments designed to revitalize the former container port into a lively community. Designed in collaboration between CEBRA, JDS, and SEARCH - and Louis Paillard in the project's conceptual phase - and completed by CEBRA, JDS, and SEARCH, this award-winning project (MIPIM Award 2013, Architizer A+ Award 2013, ArchDaily Building of the Year 2015) is notable for its four L-shaped wings and varying roof heights, optimizing daylight and views of the bay for most apartments. The Iceberg is constructed by NCC and engineering by Tækker and Hamiconsult.

=== Æbeløgade ===
Æbeløen, situated in Aarhus' Øgade neighbourhood, was developed by CEBRA from 2016 to 2020 for a private group of investors, earning the MIPIM Award 2022 for Best Residential Development and the Aarhus Municipality Architecture Award 2021. Named after the small Danish island Æbelø, Æbeløen is a reinterpretation of Øgadekvarteret's characteristic architectural elements and is located around Æbeløgade (Æbelø Street), which is the first expansion of Øgaderne since around the year 1900. The project introduces a new street designed to connect the development with the city's botanical garden and the additional historical Øgade neighbourhood, employing a design strategy that diverges from conventional residential layouts by incorporating a communal and public accessible street space. The architectural approach reflects the character of the surrounding area through elements like varied roof pitches, dormer windows, and brick facades, aiming to blend traditional local styles with contemporary design.

=== Skamlingsbanken Visitor Centre ===
The Skamlingsbanken Visitor Centre, a project led by CEBRA and completed from 2016 to 2021 for Kolding Municipality and associated organizations, is located in Sjølund, Kolding, Denmark. The natural resort Skamlingsbanken in southern Denmark holds a special place in Danish contemporary history. Over time, it has been a setting and natural stage for debates about democracy, the border country, women's suffrage, and the celebration of the ending of World War II. Awarded the Kolding Municipality Architecture Award in 2021 and the Popular Choice at the Architizer A+Awards 2024 the centre is designed to blend into the natural moraine landscape, offering panoramic views of the Little Belt strait. Its architecture, inspired by the surrounding hills and meadows formed during the last ice age, features a design that integrates the building with the landscape and Skamlingsbanken's historical significance as a meeting place.

=== The Experimentarium ===
The Experimentarium in Hellerup, Denmark, underwent a significant adaptive reuse and renovation from 2011 to 2018 as an adaptive reuse project, led by CEBRA. The project repurposed the science centre, doubling its exhibition space to include 16 interactive displays, and added a large roof terrace, modern staff facilities with views of the visitor areas, a café, a picnic area, a convention centre, teaching spaces, and workshops. The redesign further transformed the former soft-drink bottling plant and closed-off existing facilities into a welcoming, interactive science centre. This change was achieved within the existing building's footprint, requiring the expansion to be carried out within and above the original structure.

Covered in 10 tons of cobber, the widely recognised Helix staircase is a key feature of the Experimentarium, named one of the world's most spectacular staircases by The Architectural Digest. Spiralling through four floors of cafes, terraces, and exhibition spaces, the staircase's shape is inspired by a DNA chain, reflecting scientific development.

The Experimentarium was inaugurated in February 2017. The same year, the adaptive reuse of the Experimentarium was shortlisted at the World Architecture Festival.

=== Nye Masterplan ===
Nye, a new suburb designed to accommodate 13,500 inhabitants north of Aarhus, is an urban development project by Tækker Group, focusing on sustainability-driven urban planning. CEBRA has designed the master plan, which forms the foundation for developing the entire 150-hectare site. The urban planning project aims to merge the advantages of the dense, urban city centres with the open nature landscapes of green suburban areas, guided by principles of Variety, Life, and Balance. With construction ongoing since 2014, this development emphasizes a balanced approach to urban design, incorporating diverse living spaces, community living, close proximity to nature, and sustainable practices to strengthen well-being, urban living, biodiversity and improve how resources are used and reused.

In 2022, The project has received the Byplanprisen (The Urban Planning Prize) by The Danish Town Planning Institute for the visionary and nature-based collaborative urban project. The planning of Nye began in 2006 and will continue for generations.

=== LEGO Innovation Campus ===
Designed by CEBRA for KIRKBI, LEGO's new Innovation Campus in Billund is an office building on a 4-hectare site that combines a distinct architectural expression with ambitious climate impact reductions. The innovative building consists of six interwoven modules of up to four storeys, featuring play areas, open atria, and a dynamic central spine – the PlayWay – that weaves through the building to link people and functions. Generous green spaces and abundant natural daylight are key elements in fostering creativity, all within a structure built entirely from timber. The timber-built campus will accommodate approximately 1,700 employees across a range of functions. As part of the project, the building will also house the world's largest library of bricks – around 20,000 different types in 70 colours.

=== Skovbakke School ===
The Skovbakke School in Odder, Denmark, completed between 2015 and 2018, serves as both a school for 650 students and a daycare center for 100 children. This project aimed to replace outdated buildings with a unified, modern facility that supports contemporary educational methods by fostering interaction among different learning areas and incorporating physical activity into daily routines. The architectural layout features four staggered sections oriented around a central common space and themed plazas for creative, sports, and science-related activities.

=== Children’s Home of the Future ===
The Children's Home of the Future in Kerteminde, Denmark, completed between 2012 and 2014, is an 24-hour care center designed for marginalized children. Embracing the concept of "Our House," CEBRA merged the comforting aspects of traditional homes with fresh perspectives on children's care needs, drawing inspiration from the familiar forms of Danish domestic architecture, such as pitched roofs and dormer windows. The facility is divided into four interconnected sections to maintain a human scale and foster intimate, adaptable living spaces, with distinctive dormer designs.

== International works ==
=== Al Hosn master plan, UAE ===
The Al Hosn master plan in Abu Dhabi is a comprehensive revitalization project that integrates the historic Qasr Al Hosn fort with the surrounding urban landscape. Completed in 2019, the plan spans 140,000 square meters, transforming the area into a public cultural park that bridges the past and future. The design is characterized by a diagonal division of the site, creating a contrast between a soft, open desert landscape around the fort and a more urban, planted area surrounding the Cultural Foundation. A key feature of the master plan is the Al Musalla prayer hall, a series of interconnected, cave-like structures partially submerged in a central water feature. The Al Hosn projects have garnered significant international recognition, receiving a range of awards from respected outlets, including the World Architecture Festival and the Architizer A+Awards.

=== Mount Tirana, Albania ===
The Mount Tirana project, developed by CEBRA for Nova Construction 2012 and currently under construction, is set to become a prominent urban landmark in Tirana, Albania. Drawing inspiration from the country's rugged mountains, this multifunctional tower aims to reflect Albania's national identity and cultural heritage. Envisioned to be one of the tallest building in Albania at 206 meters, Mount Tirana will include residential spaces, commercial areas, a boutique hotel, business offices, parking, and dining venues, embodying the natural beauty.

=== The Sam Ibrahim Building, Canada ===
The Sam Ibrahim Building at the University of Toronto Scarborough is conceived as an inclusive academic hub, blending diverse learning environments with sensory-forward spaces that support engagement, collaboration, and well-being. The instructional center serves as a central building at UTSC, housing the Sam Ibrahim Centre for Inclusive Excellence, Student Services, and the Department of Computer and Mathematical Sciences. The learning environments are informed by CEBRA's comprehensive R&D unit, WISE, which draws on neuroarchitecture: the study of how spatial design influences cognition and well-being. 20 varied classrooms accommodate different ways of thinking, and support inclusive learning and social exchange. These spaces range from a campfirelike theatre-in-the-round to a collaborative auditorium of geometric banquettes.

=== Vjosa Wild River Visitor Centres, Albania ===
The visitor centre in Tepelenë and information stations in Përmet and Vlorë are being developed as part of the new 13,000-hectare Vjosa Wild River National Park in Albania, Europe's first protected wild river area. The designs, inspired by the natural landscape of soil and water, feature concrete slabs and natural rocks to mimic the river's surroundings. At each site, the architecture merges with the park, providing a distinctive perspective on wild nature in the interior and the landscape design. In and across the buildings, the interior offers a variety of spatial experiences. From controlled, closed areas around the open common spaces and framed views of the river to high ceilings and cave-like spaces. The buildings and landscape include facilities, which strengthen initiatives to create and share knowledge about the protection of wild nature environments, attracting eco-tourism, locals, schools, and researchers.

=== New Skenderbeu Stadium, Albania ===
In Korça, Albania, an adaptive reuse and urban development project, is underway to redevelop the existing football stadium into the new Skenderbeu Stadium. This development, part of a broader master plan, aims to transform the area into a lively neighborhood and a stadium capacity of 10,000 seats. CEBRA plans to extend the park across the Bulevardi Rilindasit and through the plot to form a green and shaded space at the very centre of the site. In the proposed master plan, the building mass is divided into city blocks as the proposal extends adjacent streets from the surrounding neighbourhoods into the area. Each block should then be filled with individual buildings of varying sizes and functions. Thus, new streets and alleys are formed that will lead through the neighbourhood and right to the arena. While some surrounding buildings will rise above the arena roofline, smaller structures are arranged around the stadium to reduce the perceived scale of the large arena and integrate it with the established architectural character and built environment of Korça.

=== Smart School, Russia ===
The Smart School project in Irkutsk, Russia, completed from 2015 to 2020, merges educational buildings and natural landscapes into a cohesive learning environment. It serves 1,040 students aged 3 to 18, featuring a variety of educational and public facilities, including a special section for orphans and children with disabilities. Rather than creating a single block, CEBRA arranged the facilities in a ring of connected buildings with overhanging eaves and a landscaped "meadow" in the centre. Together, the buildings create a total floor area of 31,100 square metres. A white ridged roof will unite the structures, creating sheltered spaces in between. The varying heights of the ridges and sizes of the eaves are intended to indicate the different functions of the buildings.

== Artworks ==
=== Architectural hand drawings by Mikkel Frost ===
Hand drawing is a consistent element of CEBRA's design methodology, used as an exploratory and communicative tool throughout the architectural process.

The approach combines quick, expressive sketches with detailed visualizations to capture ideas early, test spatial concepts, and establish a shared understanding between designers, clients, and collaborators.

In Power of the Pen, a film produced by the Louisiana Museum of Modern Art, he describes drawing as a practice that “prints what I already have built in the mind,” positioning it as a superior tool for spontaneous, clear communication with clients and collaborators.

The FRAME publication We Build Drawings showcases more than 200 sketches and watercolours from across CEBRA's portfolio, illustrating drawing as an active, iterative process that shapes architecture rather than just recording it.

=== Watercolours by Mikkel Frost ===
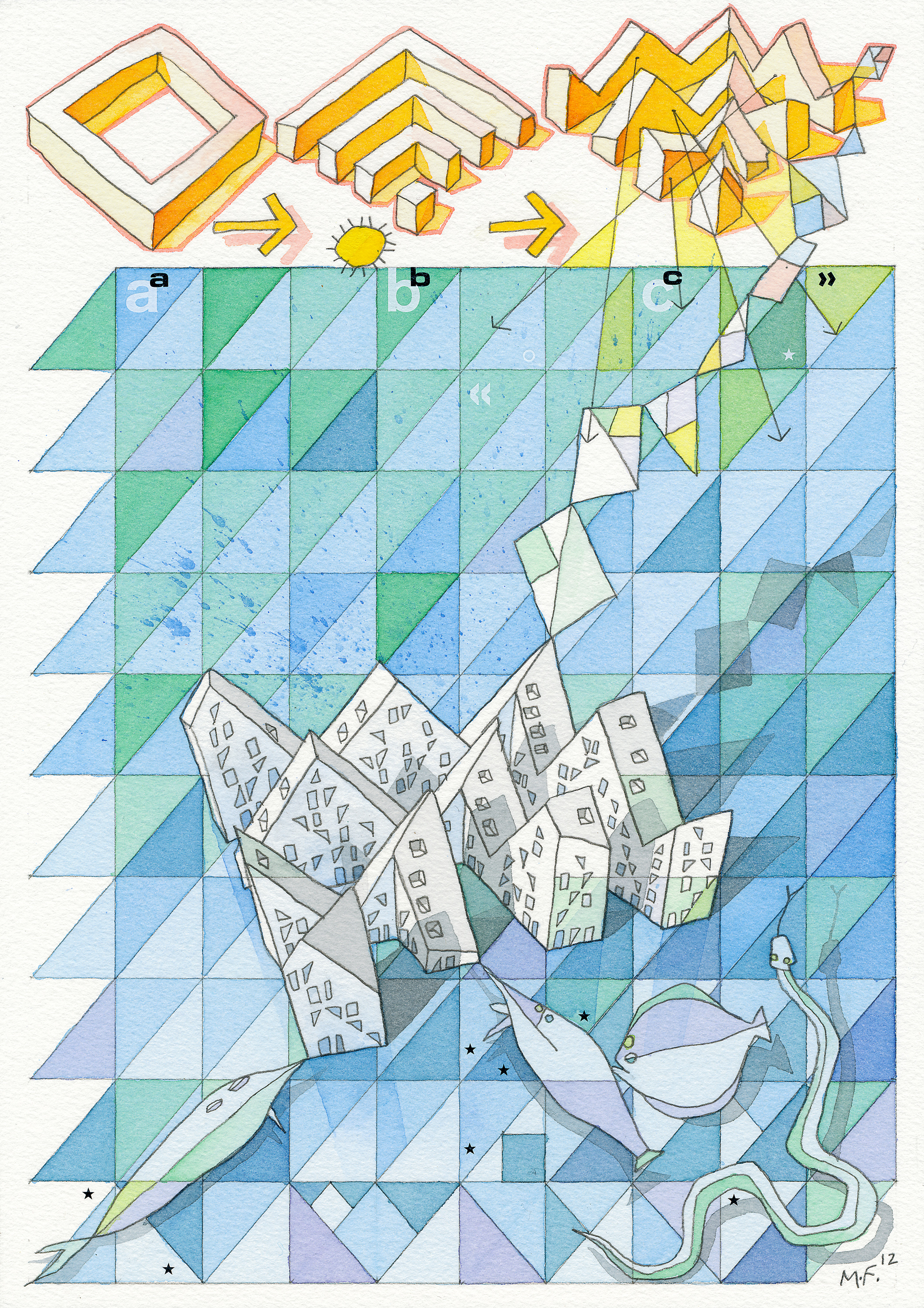
''The Iceberg'' (watercolor by Mikkel Frost, CEBRA)

Founding partner, Mikkel Frost, often paints in watercolours cartoonish concepts of some of CEBRA's projects. In the autumn of 2016, two of these watercolours were acquired by the Museum for Architectural Drawing in Berlin, Germany. In 2023, Mikkel Frost's watercolour of The Iceberg received the Architizer Vision Award in the Hand Drawn Drawing category. The award recognises the industry leaders in the art of architectural drawing. The Iceberg watercolour, much like Frost's other watercolours, merges ancient techniques with playful contemporary styles, uniting problem-solving with artistic ambition, reminding architects of the art form's potential beyond clients’ demands.

=== Publication: “We build drawings” ===
In 2019, Mikkel Frost published the book "We Build Drawings," showcasing over 200 drawings across 20 sections, each dedicated to a specific CEBRA project. The book includes an index with color photos and renders, demonstrating how these drawings come to life in their architectural works. Additionally, it features a written adaptation of Frost's TEDx talk, "Let Your Fingers Do the Talking," highlighting the importance of drawing as a fundamental tool for creation and communication.

== R&D projects ==
=== WISE ===
In 2019, CEBRA launched a research and development program named WISE (Work, Innovation, Space and Education), focusing on exploring the sensory and emotional impact of architecture on the human mind and behavior. WISE aims to integrate the evolving dynamics of workspace and education sectors to guide the architectural design of spaces that foster learning and technologies. Additionally, it seeks to link architectural practices with leading concepts from education and entrepreneurship, incorporating insights from sensory stimuli, cognitive psychology, and behaviorism research.

=== Reduction Roadmap ===
The Reduction Roadmap was launched in 2022 to align the Danish construction sector with the safe operating space of planetary boundaries, as determined by research. This initiative aims to ensure activities remain within international frameworks like the UN Paris Agreement or the Montreal Biodiversity Framework with yearly, gradual targets.

The Reduction Roadmap 1.0, based on the 2021 global CO₂ budget, set a 2036 target of 0.4 kg CO₂/m^{2}/year for new housing to stay within safe climate limits.

Reduction Roadmap 2.0, released in 2023, expanded to cover over 90% of new construction and set a 2030 climate impact target of 0.3 kg CO₂/m^{2}/year. Backed by 630+ firms, municipalities, and organisations, the industry pushed for a 2025 target of 5.8 kg CO₂/m^{2}/year in the national building code, significantly influencing the final legislation despite partial adoption. The carbon cap was lowered by 40%. This earned the initiative the Lille Arne, Børsen's selected green cases, and Energiforum Danmark's Impact Award.

In 2024, Reduction Roadmap became a non-profit association to continue developing research-based targets for a timely green transition. Its first publication, Beyond the Roadmap, introduces a butterfly framework combining CO₂ reduction and biodiversity regeneration goals for a regenerative construction sector beyond 2030.

All publications are open source and designed for international scalability. The Reduction Roadmap has been adopted in e.g. Sweden, Germany, and Australia.

=== Low-carbon case study buildings ===
==== MiniCO2 Multi-Storey Building CONCRETE ====
The Danish project, MiniCO₂ Etagehus BETON, is a five-storey, mono-material apartment building initiated by Realdania By & Byg, serving as a case study in low-emission concrete construction. Through structural optimisation, reuse, and low-cement concrete, it demonstrates how early design choices can reduce CO₂ within a conventional budget. The building will provide five rental homes and target a climate impact below 5 kg CO₂e/m^{2}/year for materials and 7.3 including energy, well below the Danish 2024 average footprint for housing, around 9.6. It also aims for DGNB Gold certification. By reducing the concrete use and optimising the structure, ‘MiniCO₂ Etagehus BETON’ serves as a scalable model for low-emission concrete construction. The mono-material apartment building takes part in a material-focused case study designed of comparing the low-emission potentials for concrete, wood and brick buildings respectively.

==== Villa 1 ====
Villa 1 is a project featuring single-family and detached houses, with a focus reducing on utilizing bio-based materials including wood, clay, seagrass, and straw. Villa 1 aims to reduce emissions from newly constructed homes to around 25 % of the average – from 9.6 kg CO₂e/m^{2}/year to just 2.5. The key to this significant reduction in CO₂ has been to carefully consider all elements of the design – from material choices to living space and business model. The ambition of building Villa 1 is to replace the excessively large carbon footprint per person with architecture oriented towards quality, health, community, and life in better harmony with nature. Once Villa 1 is put into use, and based on careful evaluation, a cluster of single-family and duplex houses will be built.

== Selected awards ==
CEBRA has received a number of international awards. Among them:

- 2025 – Al Hosn Musalla receives Gold at the WAN Awards, Public Realm – Over 10,000
- 2025 – Al Hosn Masterplan receives Silver at the WAN Awards, Publicly Accessible Buildings – Over 10,000
- 2025 – Reduction Roadmap receives Energiforum Danmark's Impact Award 2025 for an outstanding initiative
- 2024 – Malling Dampmølle wins the Popular Choice at the Architizer A+Awards, Best Low Rise Multi-unit Housing
- 2024 – Skamlingsbanken Visitor Centre wins the Popular Choice at the Architizer A+Awards, Best Cultural and Expo Center
- 2024 – The Reduction Roadmap receives the Lille Arne for an outstanding architectural initiative
- 2023 – Randers Municipality Architecture Award for Danish Crown HQ
- 2023 – Founding Partner Mikkel Frost receives the Architizer Vision Award
- 2022 – Al Hosn Masterplan receives Architizer A+Awards 2022, Urban and Masterplan
- 2022 – Æbeløen receives MIPIM Awards 2022, Best Residential Development
- 2022 – The Reduction Roadmap receives The Sustainable Element Collaboration Award 2022 by Building Green DK
- 2021 – Al Hosn masterplan receives WAF 2021, Landscape – Urban Context
- 2021 – Al Hosn masterplan receives WAN Award 2021, Mixed Use
- 2021 – Kolding Municipality Architecture Award for Skamlingsbanken
- 2021 – Aarhus Municipality Architecture Award for Æbeløgade
- 2021 – Aarhus Municipality Architecture Award for Strandvillaen
- 2020 – Al Hosn Masterplan receives AIA Middle East 2020, Urban Landscape
- 2020 – Al Hosn Masterplan receives AIA Middle East 2020, Culture
- 2020 – Al Hosn Masterplan receives Identity Design Award 2020, Urban Landscape
- 2020 – Al Hosn Musalla wins Identity Award 2020, Best Cultural Building
- 2020 – Al Hosn Musalla receives Architizer Award 2020, Architecture + Ceilings
- 2020 – Kolding Municipality Architecture Award for Koldinghave
- 2019 – Al Hosn Musalla receives Completed Building Religion at the World Architecture Festival
- 2018 – Skovbakke School nominated for School Building of the Year in Denmark
- 2018 – Experimentarium receives Danish Aluminium Prize 2018
- 2017 – Shortlisted at World Architecture Festival (Higher Education and Research) for the Experimentarium
- 2015 – Odense Municipality Architecture Award for HF & VUC Fyn
- 2015 – ArchDaily Building of the Year 2015, best housing project for the Icebergk
- 2015 – The Children's Home of the Future is on the top 40 shortlist for the Mies van der Rohe Award
- 2013 – MIPIM Award 2013, best residential development for the Iceberg
- 2013 – Architizer A+ Award, best residential mid-rise for the Iceberg
- 2008 – CEBRA receives the Nykredit's Architecture Award
- 2006 – Golden Lion Award at the Venice Biennale for Architecture for Best National Pavilion
- 2006 – The Bakkegaard School is nominated for the Mies van der Rohe Award

== Gallery ==
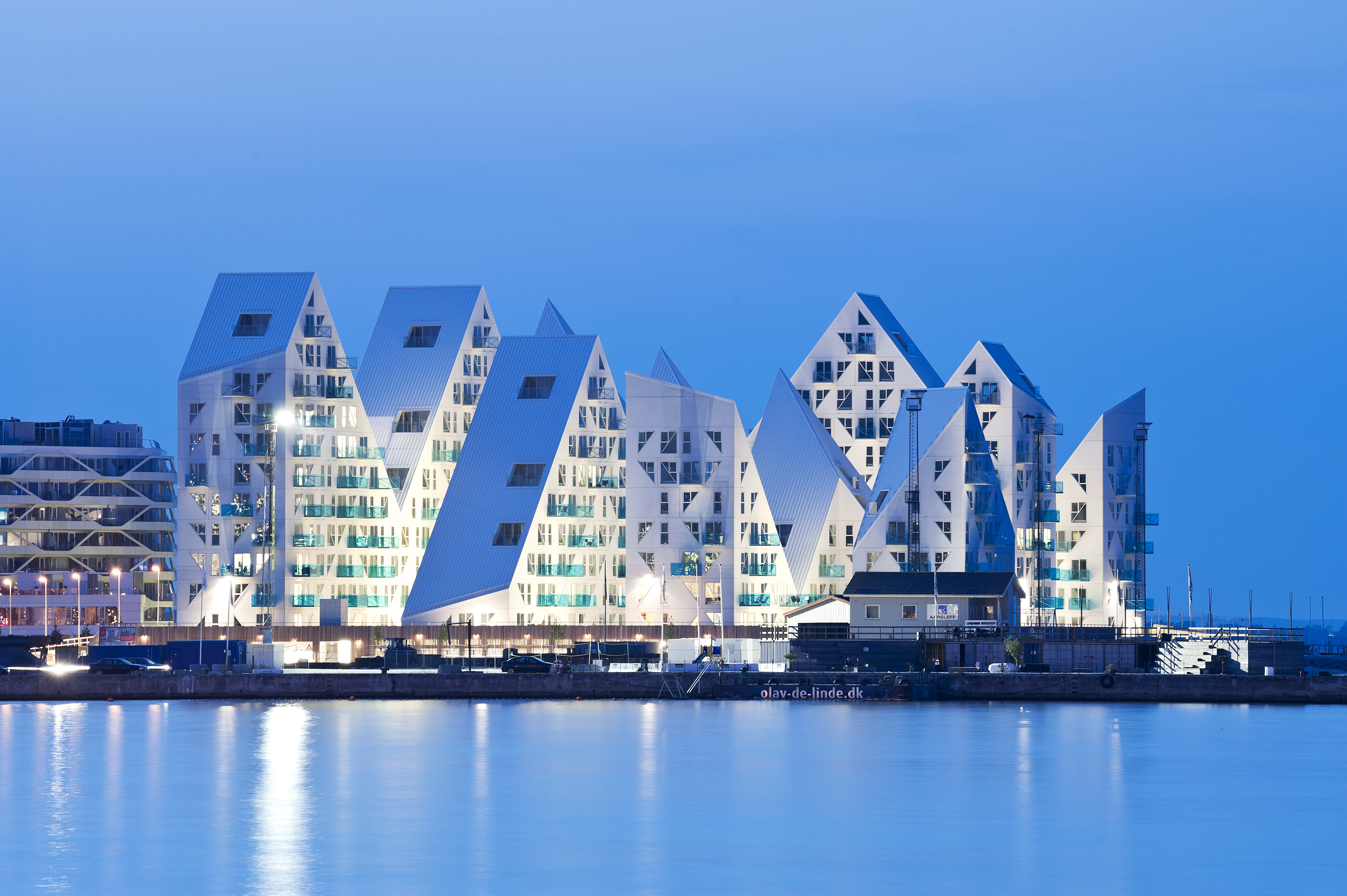
The Iceberg

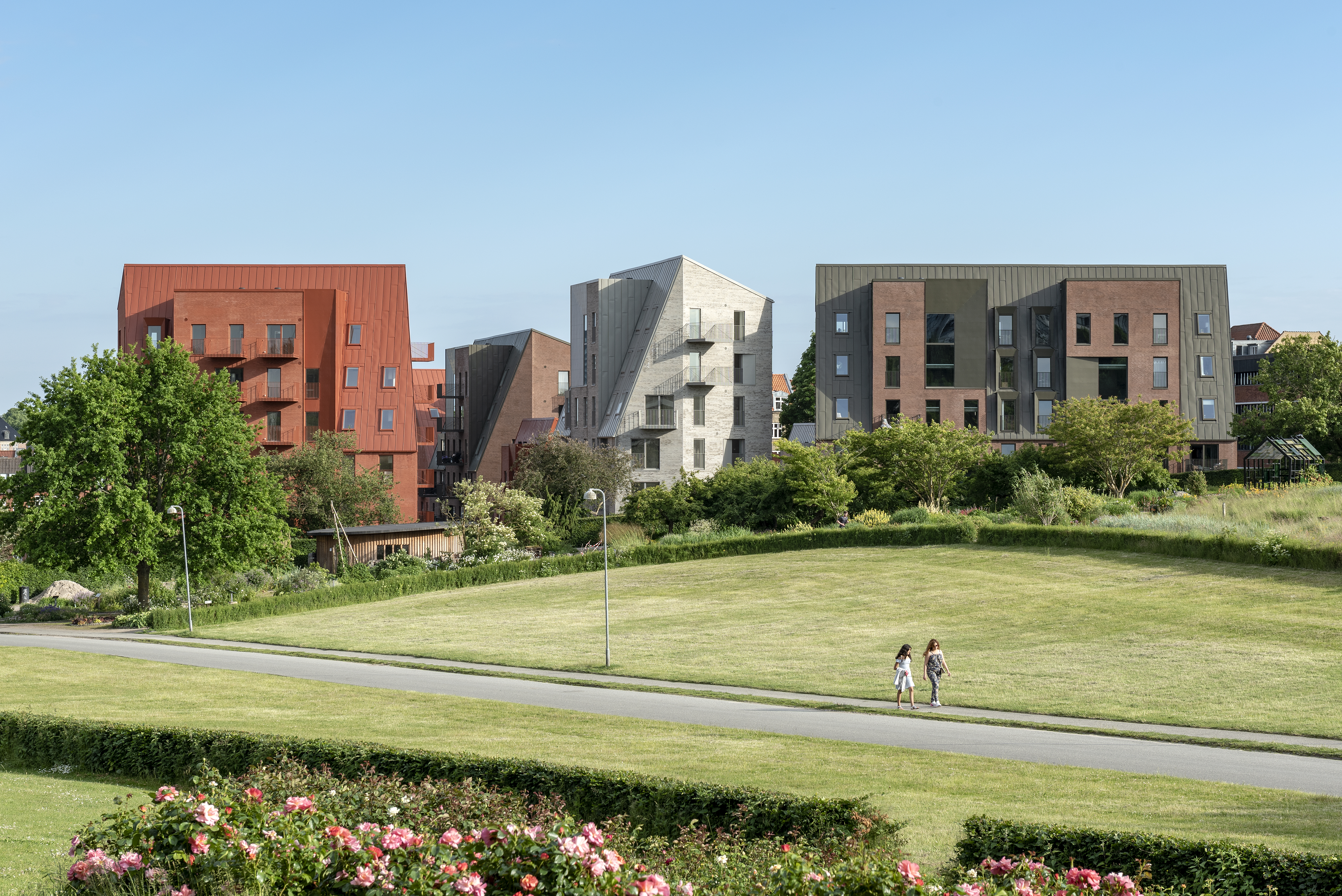
Æbeløen – photo by Mikkel Frost / CEBRA

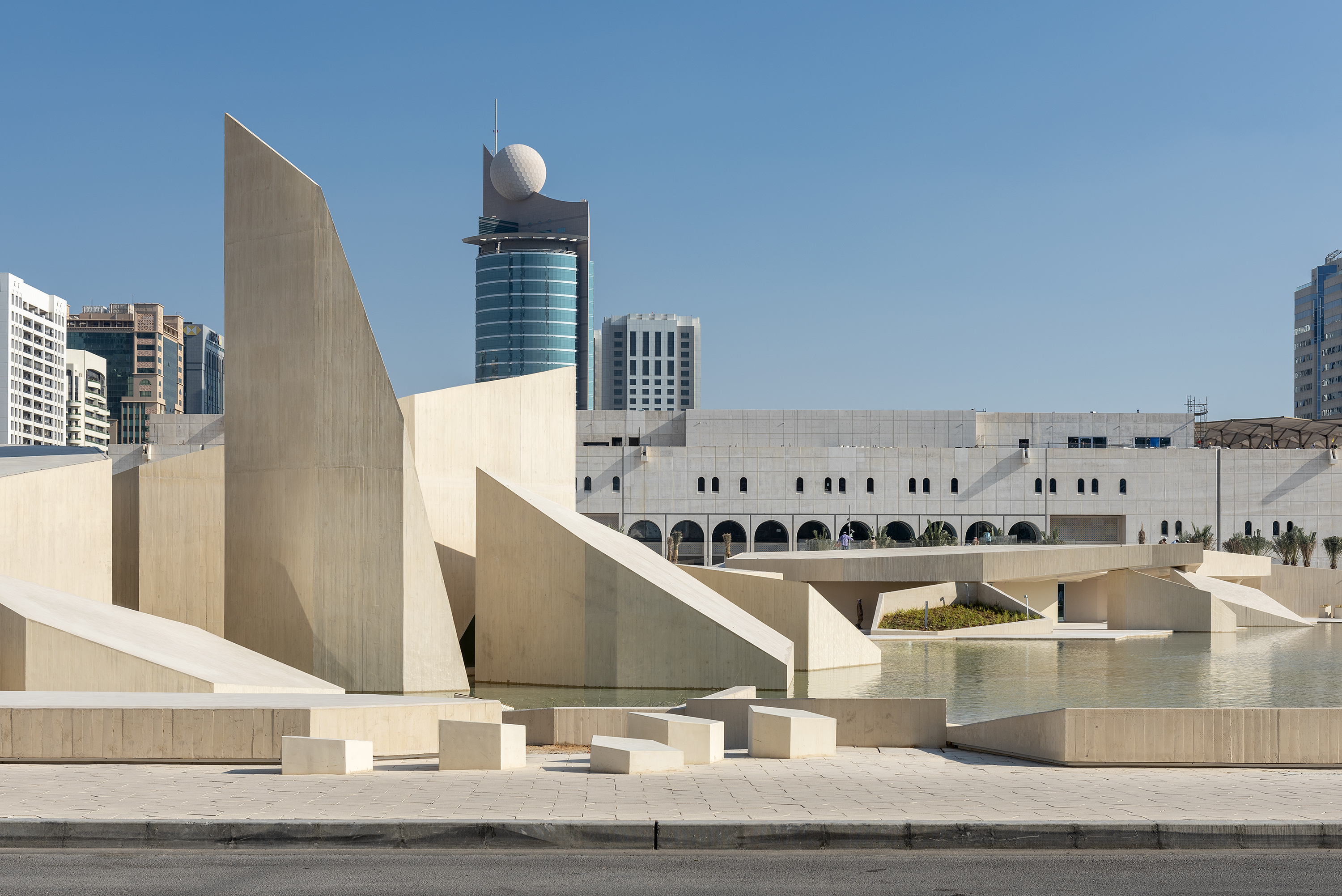
Al Hosn Musalla

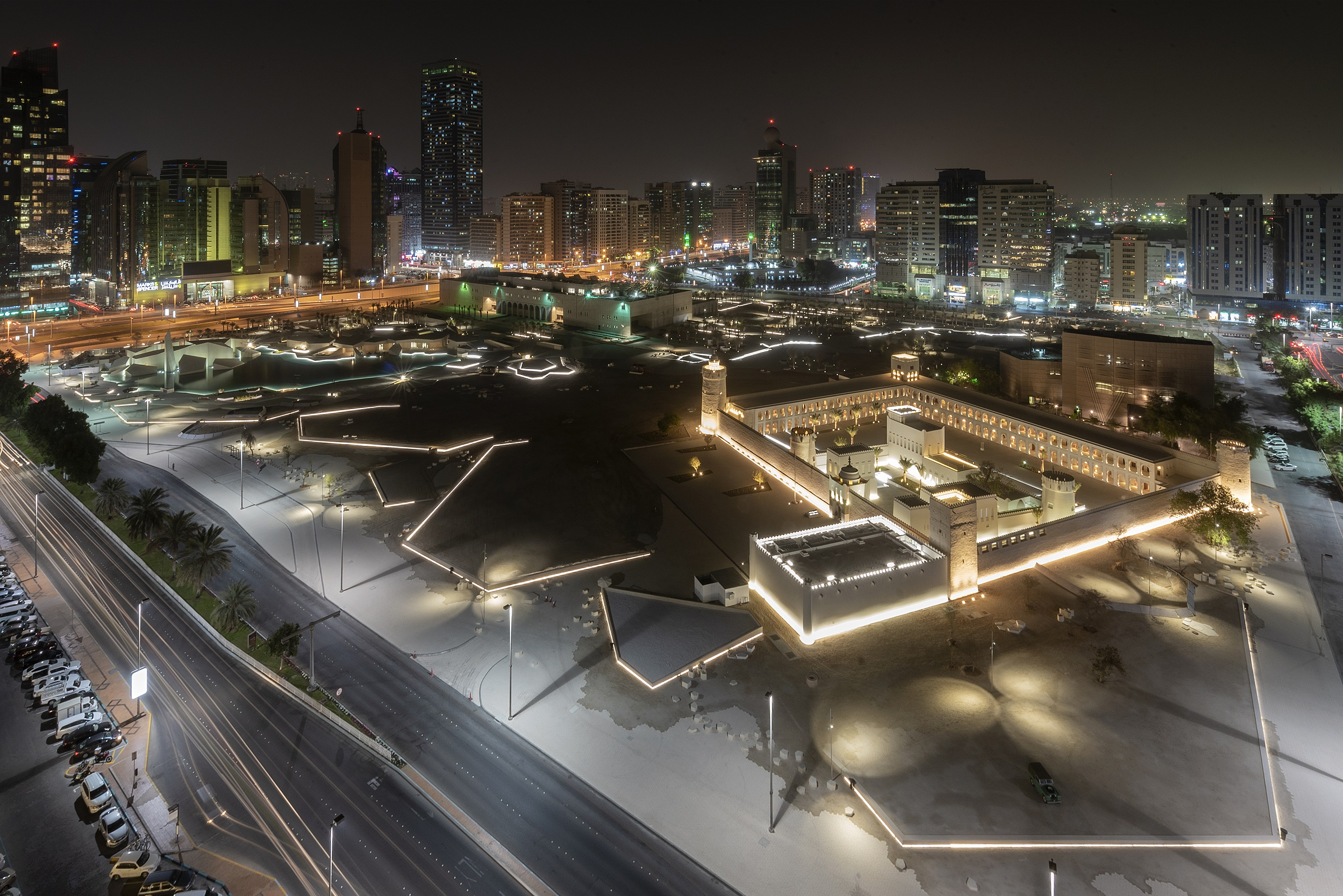
Al Hosn site

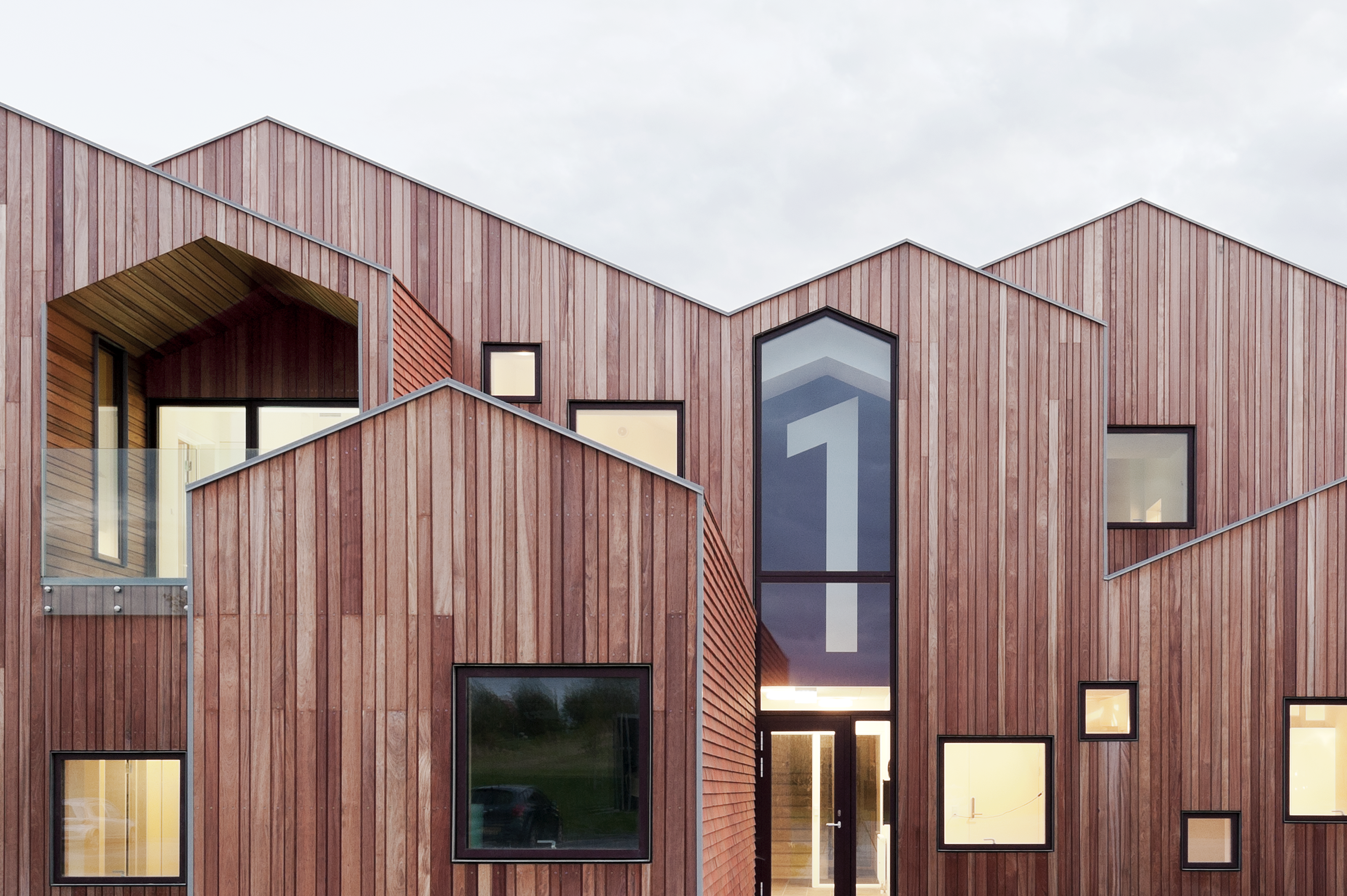
Children’s Home of the Future

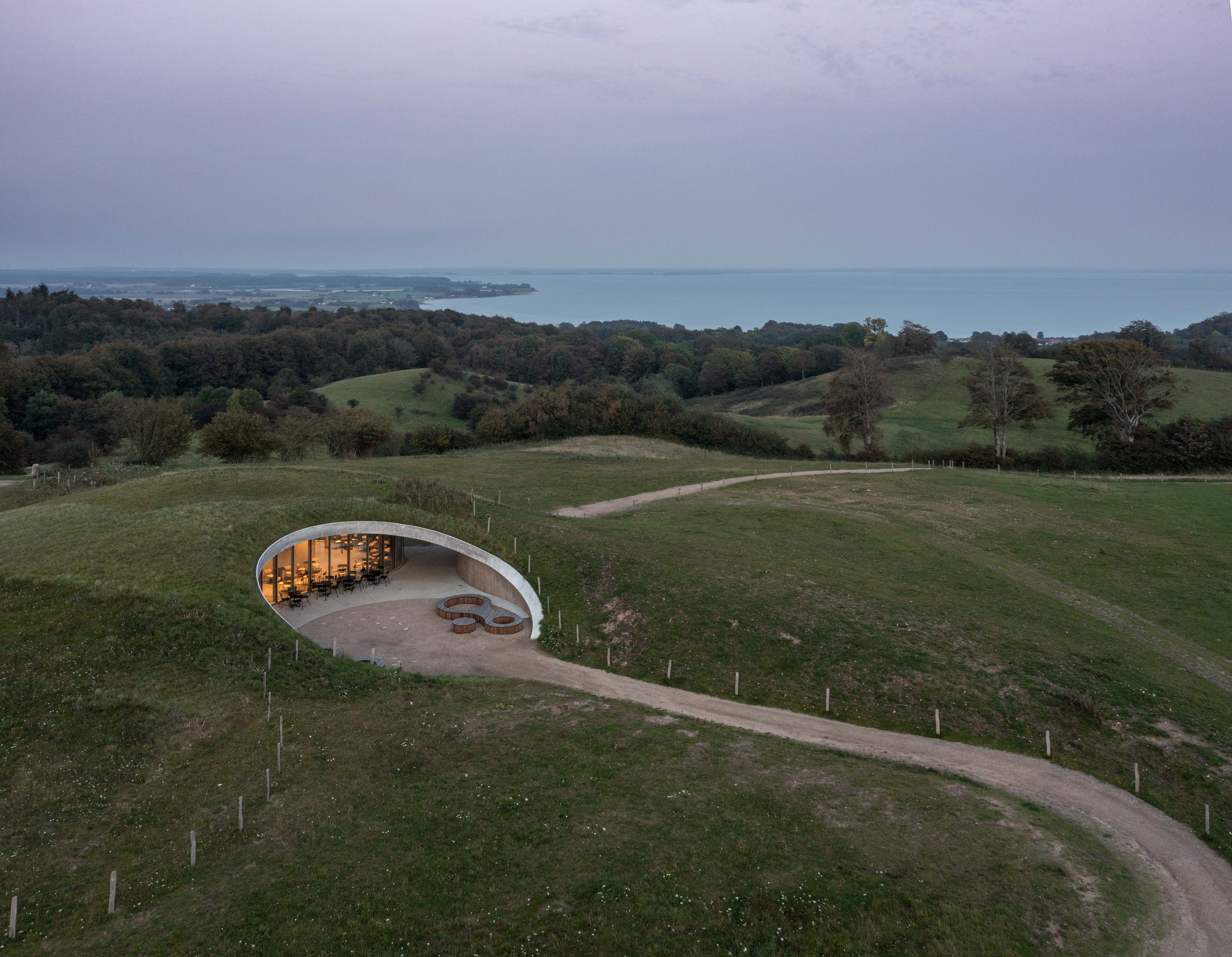
Skamlingsbanken

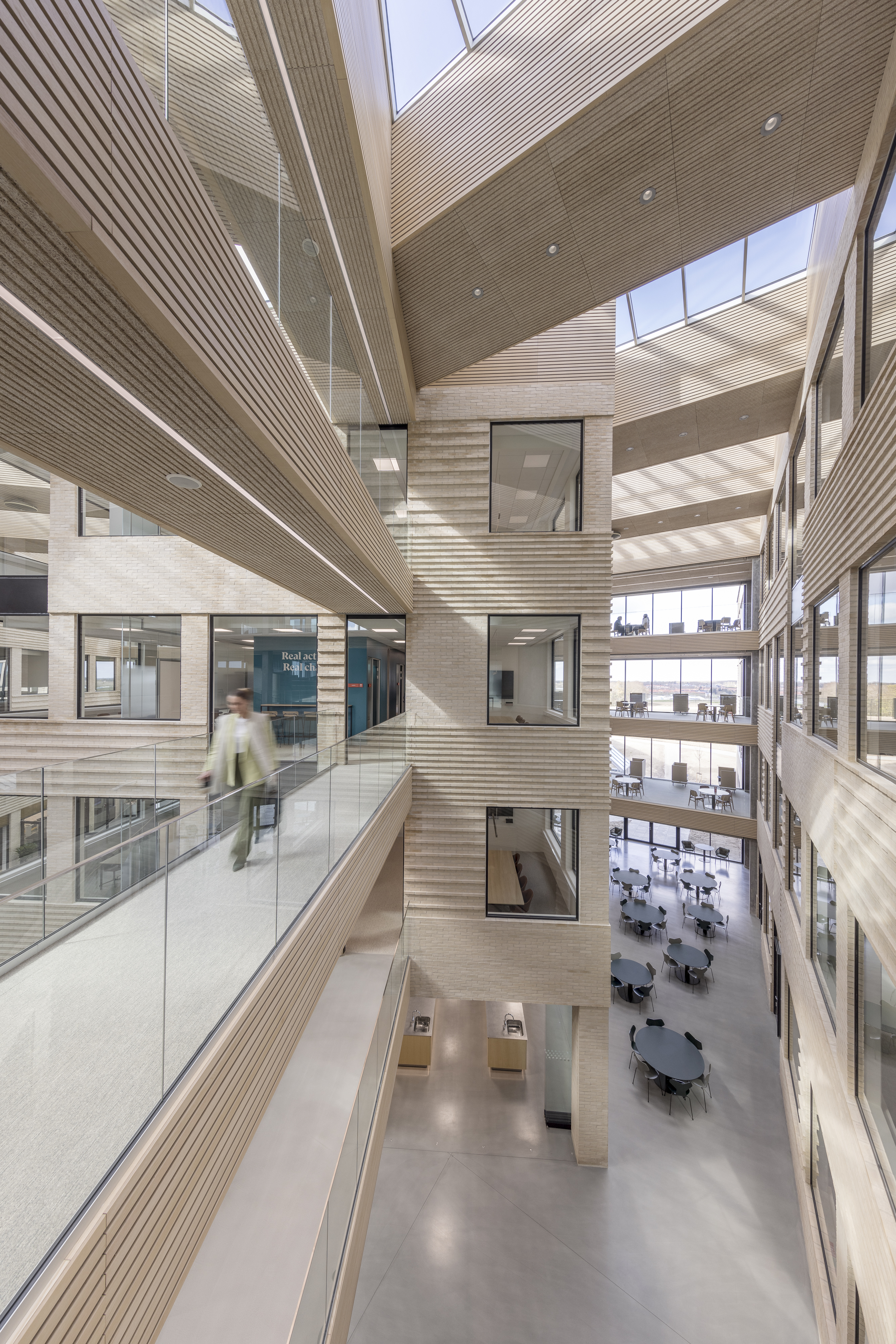
Danish Crown Headquarters

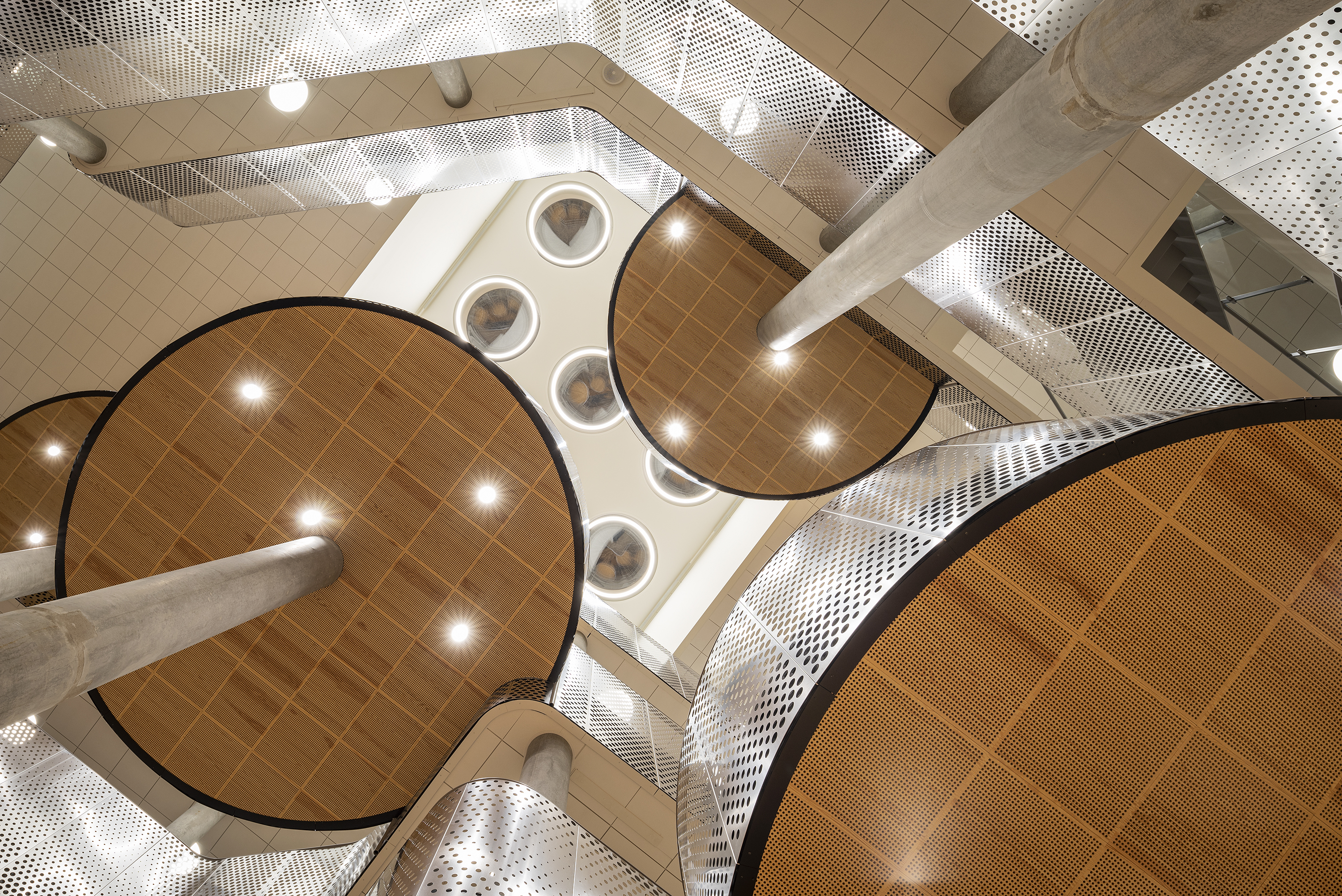
Aarhus Vand

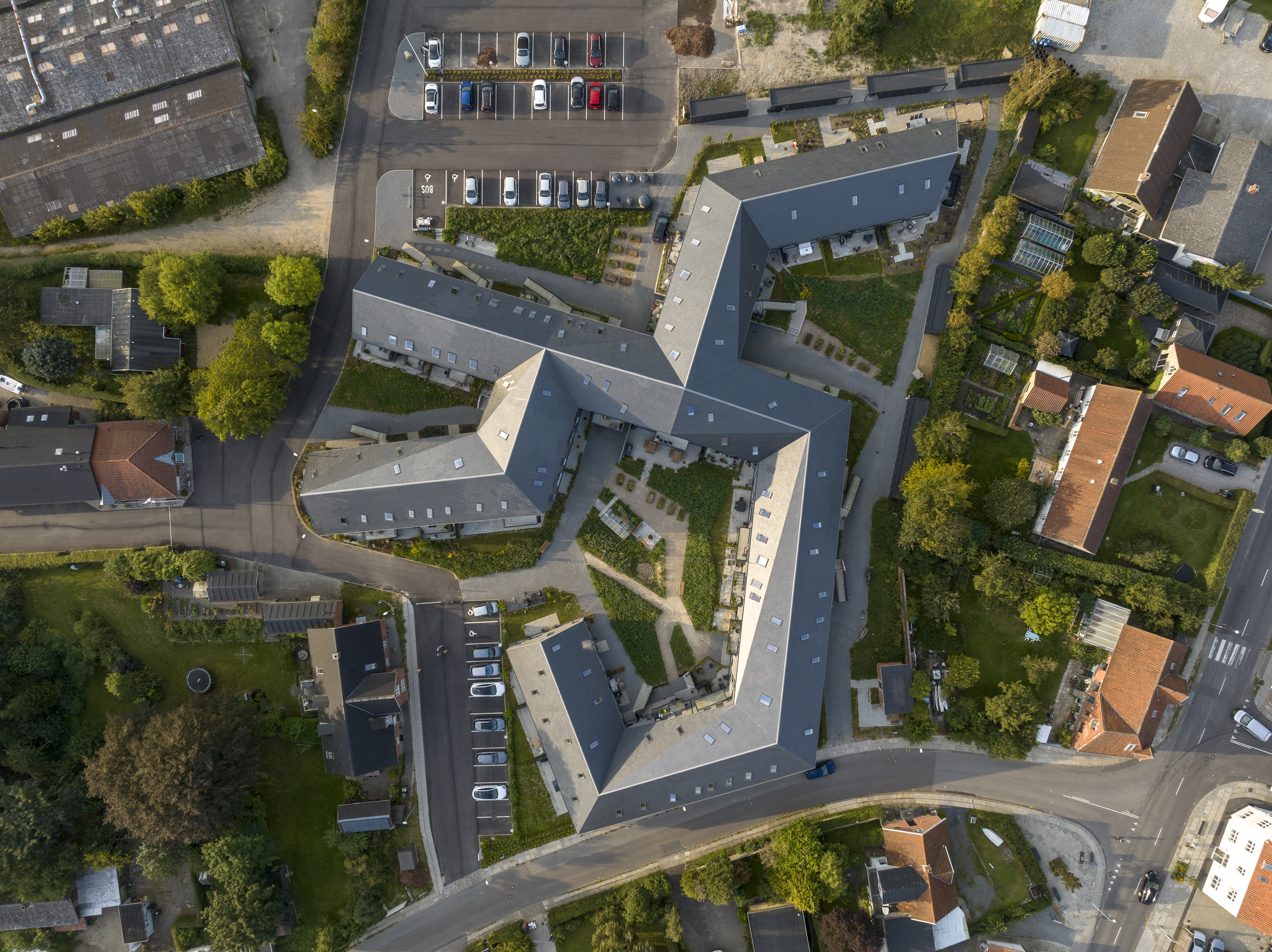
Malling Dampmølle

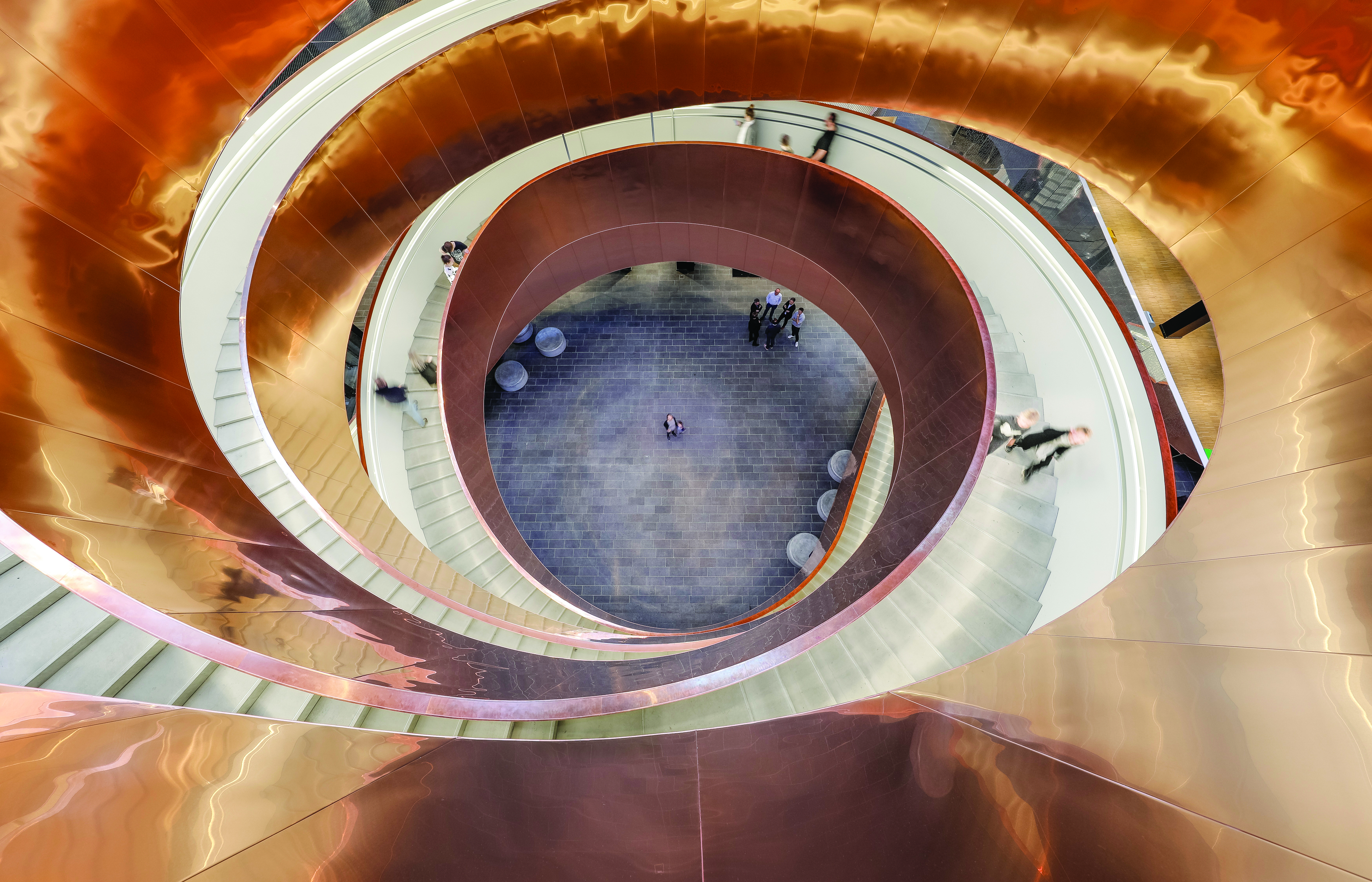
Experimentarium

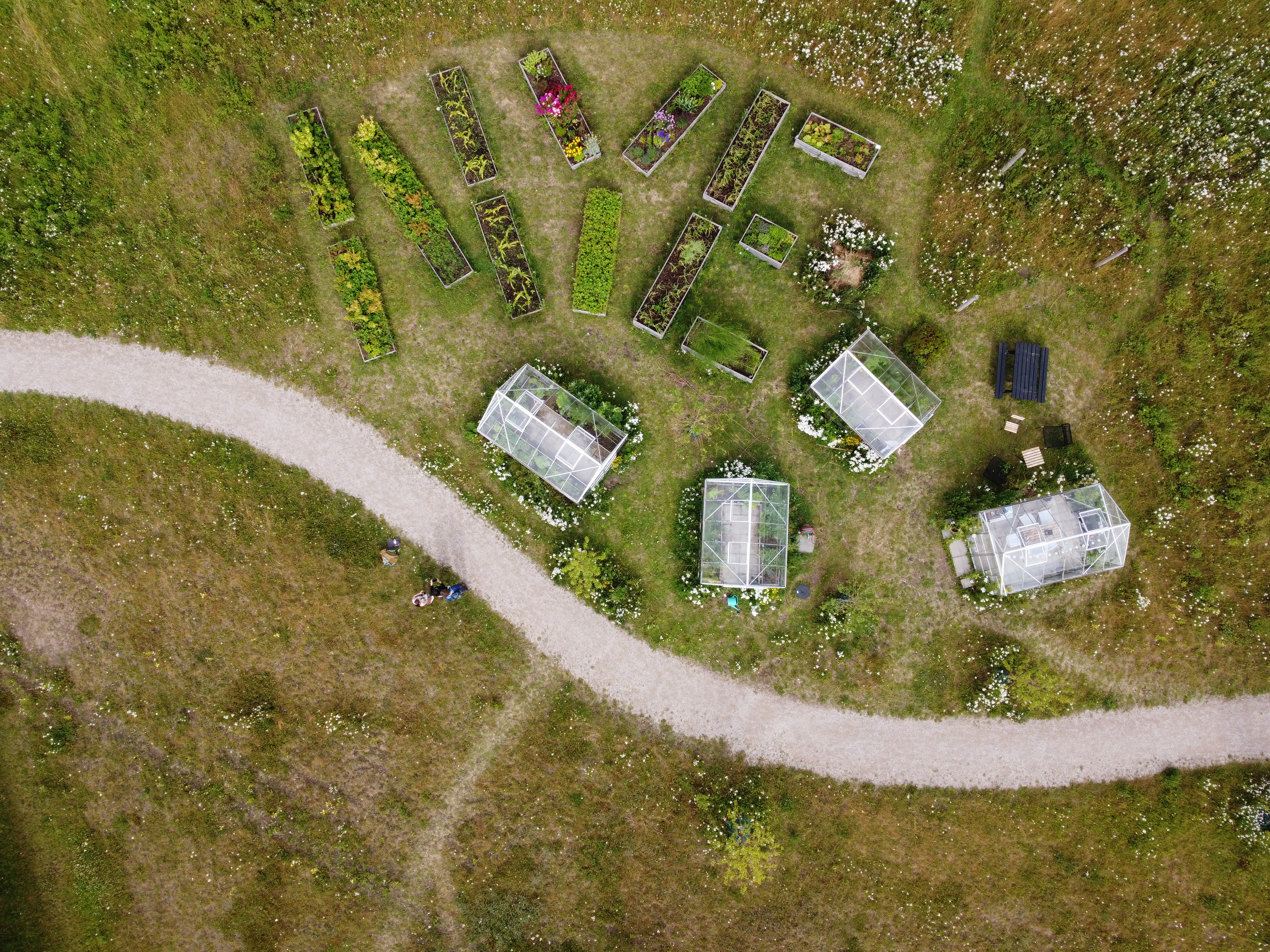
Nye

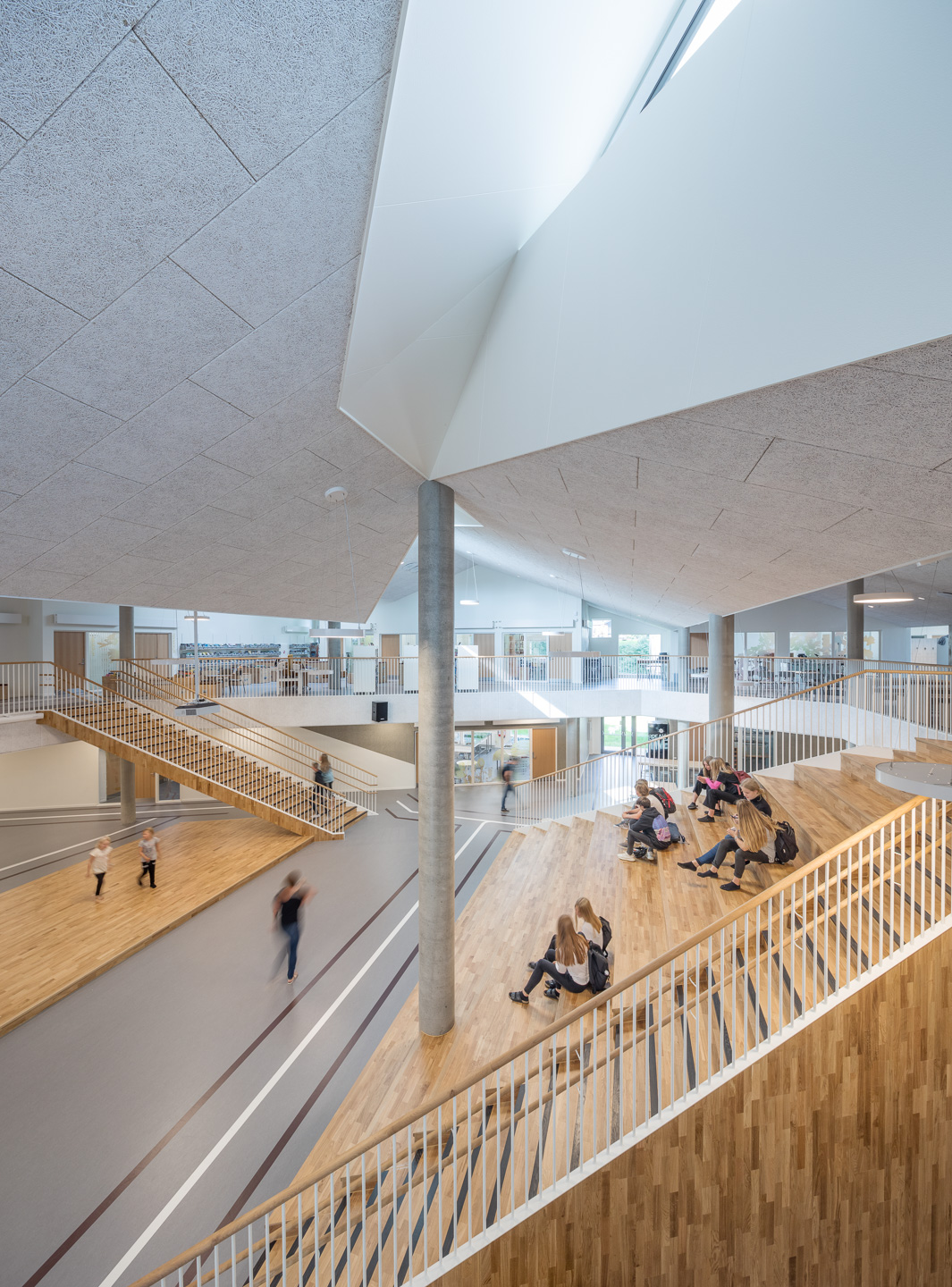
Skovbakkeskolen

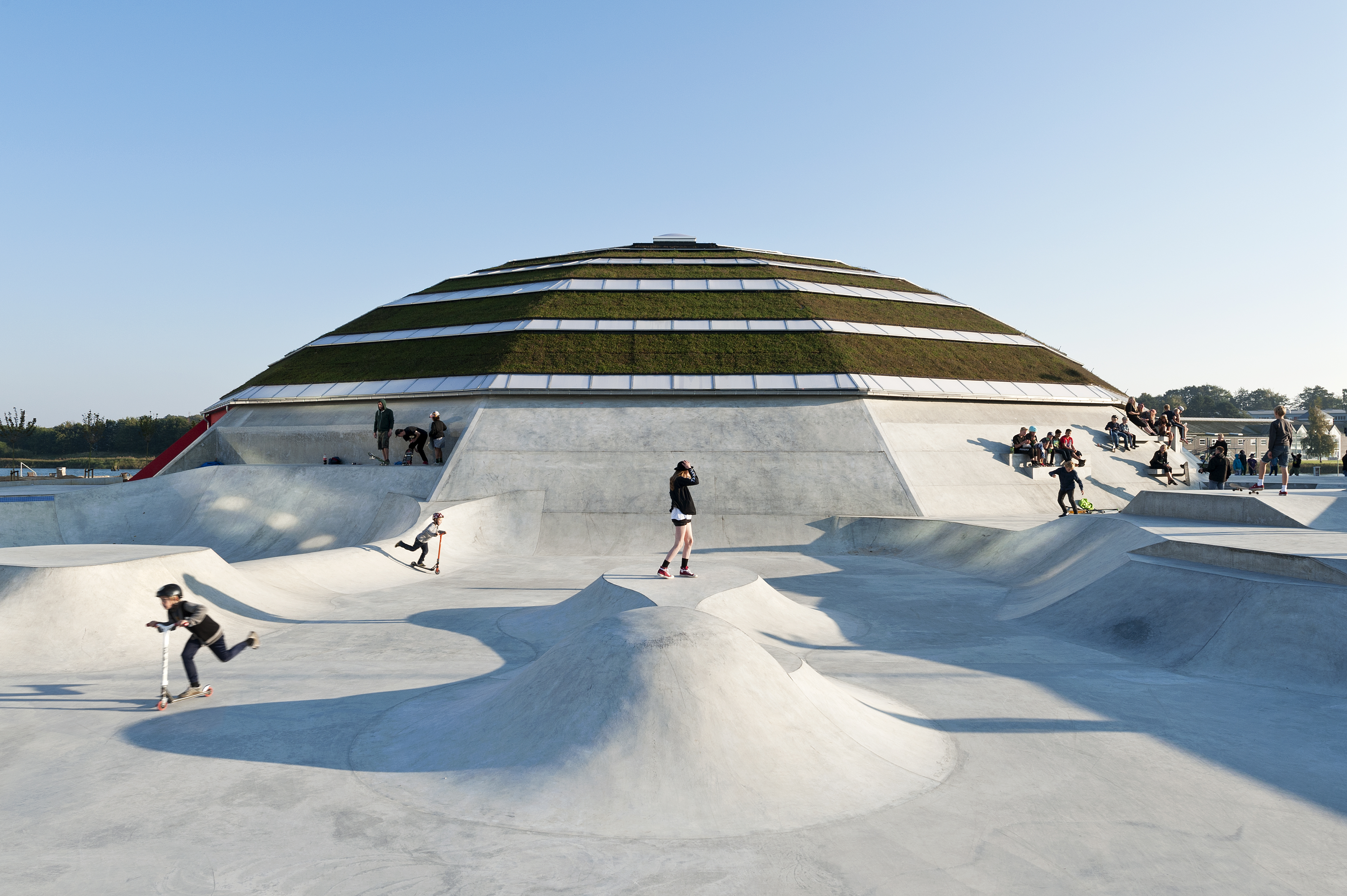
Street Dome

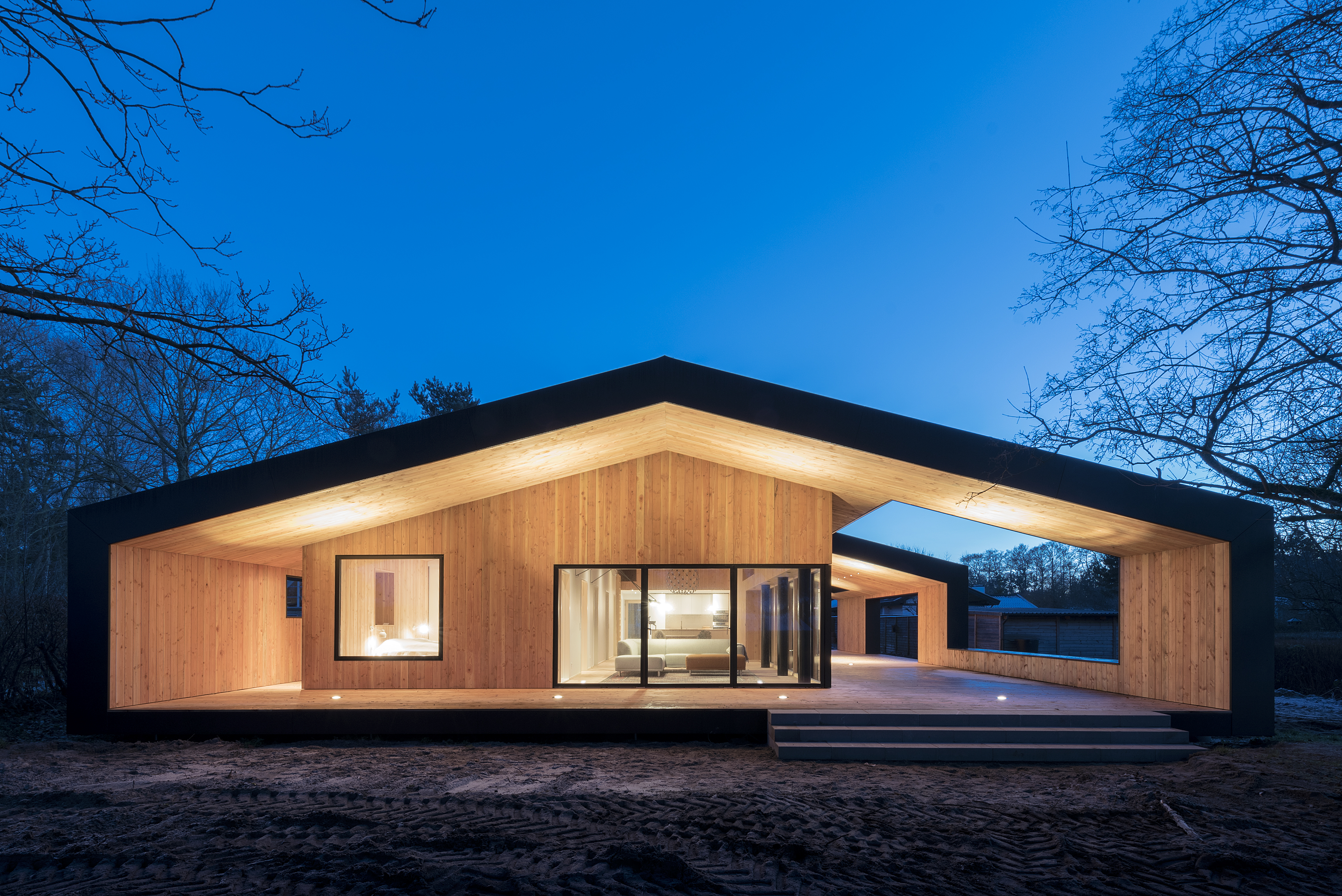
Treldehuset

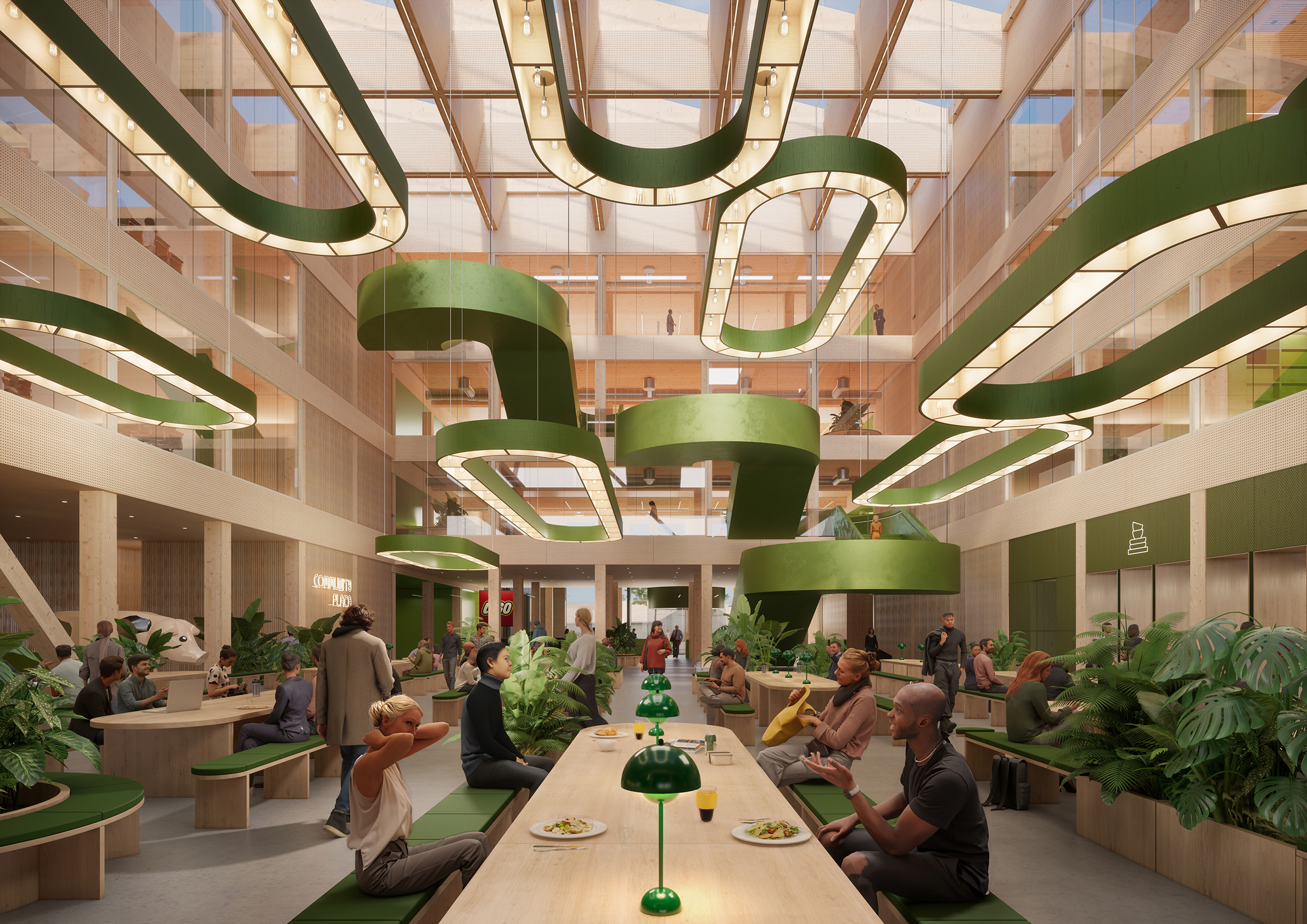
Innovation Campus interior
