= Vilhelm Wohlert =

Danish architect (1920–2007)

- Born: 27 May 1920; Copenhagen, Denmark
- Died: 10 May 2007 (aged 86); Klampenborg, Denmark
- Education: Royal Danish Academy of Fine Arts
- Occupation: Architect
- Awards: Eckersberg Medal; C. F. Hansen Medal (1979); Order of the Dannebrog; Nykredit Architecture Prize
- Practice: Bo and Wohlert
- Buildings: Louisiana Museum of Modern Art; Bochum Museum of Art

Vilhelm Wohlert (27 May 1920 – 10 May 2007) was a Danish architect. His most notable work was on the Louisiana Museum of Modern Art in Humlebæk, Denmark.

== Early life and education ==
Wohlert was born in Copenhagen, Denmark. He trained at the Royal Danish Academy of Fine Arts' School of Architecture, where one of his teachers was Kaare Klint (1888–1954). From 1946-47, he worked in Stockholm with the architects Sven Markelius and Hakon Ahlberg, both practitioners of Scandinavian modernism. He also worked in collaboration with Kaare Klint until his death in 1954.

== Career ==
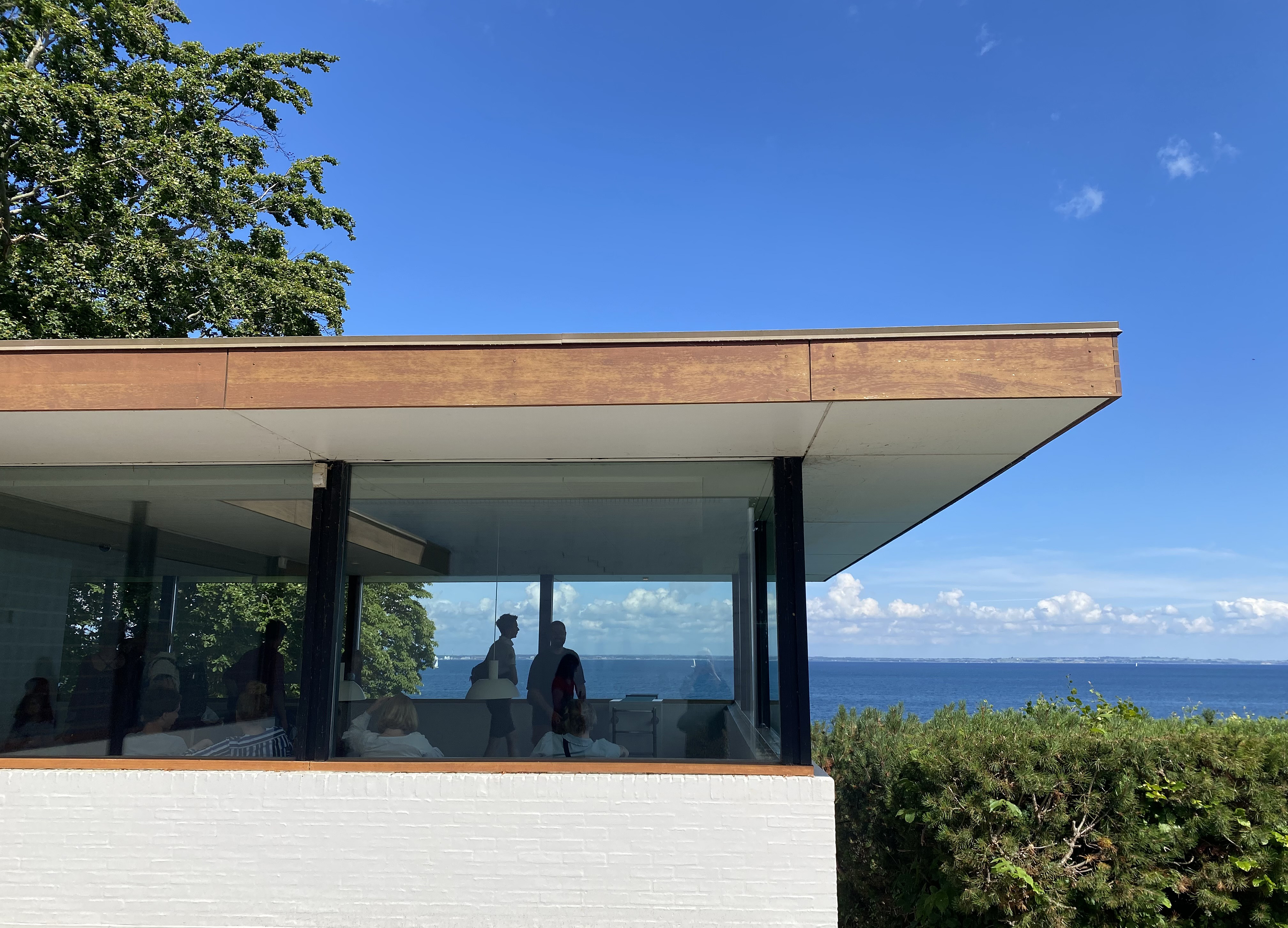
Louisiana Museum of Modern Art, Humlebæk, Denmark.

In 1958, he and his partner and fellow architect Jørgen Bo (1919–1999) started work on the Danish modernist architecture Louisiana Museum of Modern Art in Humlebæk, a project on which they would work for the next 33 years.

In Germany, they were also responsible for the Bochum Museum of Art (Kunstmuseum Bochum) which opened in 1960, as well as the Gustav-Lübcke-Museum in Hamm, which was commissioned in 1993.

Another major part of Wohlert's work was on Danish churches. He designed Stengård Church (Stengård kirke) and worked on the restoration of both the Lutheran and Catholic cathedrals of Copenhagen: the Church of Our Lady and St. Ansgar's Church. He also designed the mausoleum of King Frederik IX at Roskilde Cathedral.

Wohlert was also an educator, early in his career at University of California, Berkeley where he was also awarded the post of visiting professor at the University of California, Berkeley from 1951 through 1953. Later for many years as a professor at the Royal Danish Academy of Fine Arts in Copenhagen where he held the position of professor from 1968 until 1986.

== Distinctions ==
- 1982 Dreyer Honorary Award

== Other sources ==
- Pardey, John (28 May 2007). "Vilhelm Wohlert". The Independent.
- "Vilhelm Wohlert". Den Store Danske Encyklopædi (in Danish).
