= Praksis Arkitekter =

Danish architectural firm

Praksis Arkitekter is a Danish architectural firm with offices in Troense, Svendborg. It was founded by and is owned by Mette Tony and Mads Bjørn Hansen. The firm received Dreyers Fond's Honorary Award for Architecture in 2017.

Mads Bjørn and Mette Tony have most recently received Hack Kampmann's Architecture Prize 2020 2017, Dreyer's Foundation's Honorary Prize 2017, the Concrete Element Prize 2017 for the Frihavns Tårnet, Store Arne 2017 for “Copenhagen's best building 2017” for Forskerboligerne in Carlsberg city.

== Selected projects ==
- Port Authority Building, Svendborg, Denmark (2010)
- Kulturmaskinen, Odense, Denmark (2010)
- Researchers' House, Carlsberg, Copenhagen )2016)
- Oluf Børgesens Plads, Odense (competition win 2016)
- Maltfabrikken, Ebeltoft, Denmark (competition win 2016)
- Steiner Skolen expansion, Odense, Denmark
- Frihavns Tårnet, Nordhavn, Copenhagen (2017)
- Svinkløv Badehotel, 2017
- Spritten Art Center Aalborg, 2019
- UNESCO besøgscenter Stevns klint, 2019
- Karen Blixen Museet, 2021

== Awards ==
- 2008 Eckersberg Medals for Mette Tony and Mads Bjørn Hansen
- 2017 Danish Concrete Element Award for Frihavns Tårnet
- 2017 Dreyer's Honorary Award
- 2017 Nykredit Architecture Prize
