= Stig Lennart Andersson =

Danish landscape architect

Stig Lennart Andersson (born 30 March 1957) usually referred to as Stig L. Andersson, is a Danish landscape architect, founder and Creative Director of Copenhagen-based SLA which has developed into an interdisciplinary organisation working with landscape, urban spaces and urban planning.

Andersson is also professor at University of Copenhagen and was visiting professor at Aarhus School of Architecture in 2009.

== Biography ==
Stig L. Andersson studied landscape architecture at the School of Architecture at the Royal Danish Academy of Fine Arts from 1981 to 1986. Following his graduation, he travelled to Japan on a Japanese scholarship. After first embarking on an academic career, working as an assistant professor from 1985 to 1991, he set up his own practice in 1994. In 2002 it was the first office to be awarded the international landscape architecture magazine Topos's European Landscape Award in recognition of its focus on sensory urban spaces.

The firm is a frequent collaborator with leading Danish architectural firms such as Henning Larsen Architects, C. F. Møller Architects and Lundgaard & Tranberg.

At the 2011 International Horticultural Exposition in Xi'an, China, Andersson was one of 10 landscape architects specially invited to create a so-called 'master garden'.

== Projects ==
=== Completed ===
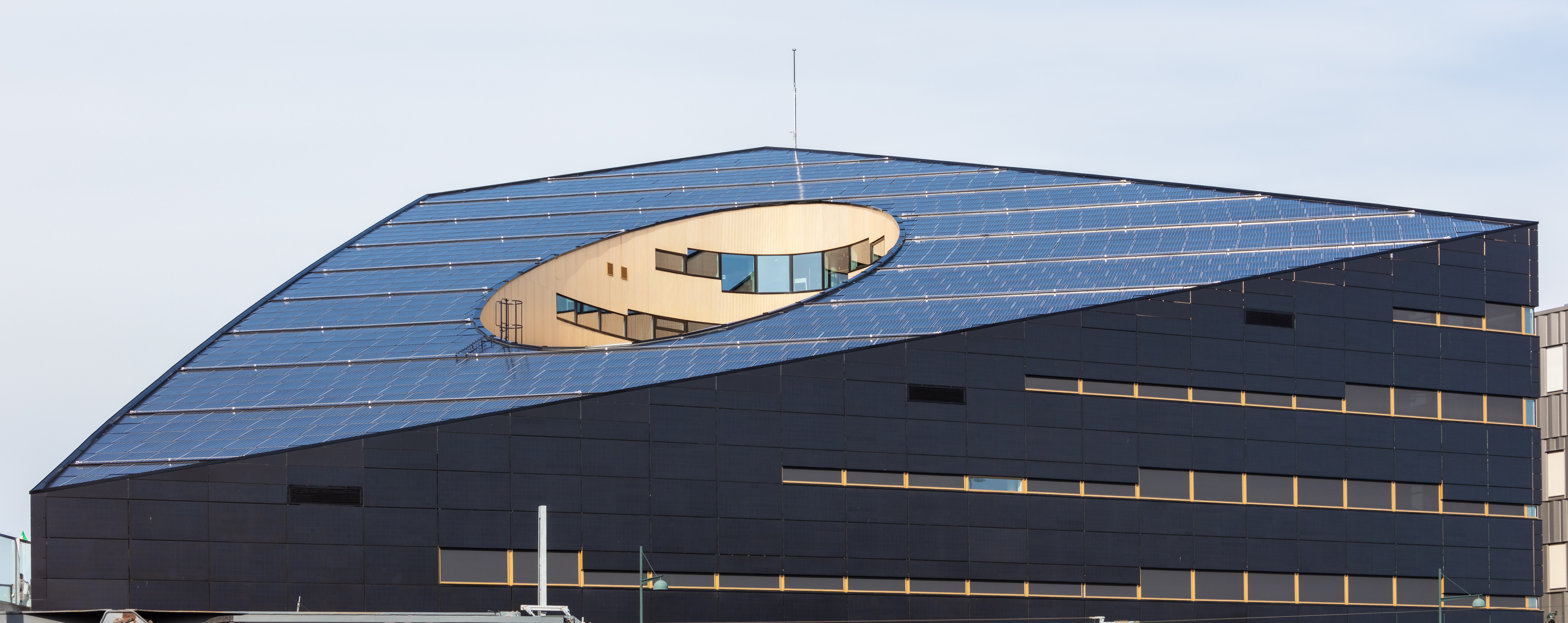
Brattørkaia, Trondheim, Norway.

- Glostrup Rådhuspark (1997–2000)
- Hillerød Bibliotek og Videnscenter (1999–2001)
- Frederikssund Havneplads (1999–2002)
- Trylleskoven masterplan, Solrød (planlagt 2004)
- Valby Idrætspark (2005–06)
- Frederiksberg Central Squares, Frederiksberg, Copenhagen (2006)
- Sønder Boulevard, Copenhagen (2007)
- Elephant House (with Foster + Partners), Copenhagen Zoo, Copenhagen (2008)
- Urban Dune, SEB Bank (with Lundgaard & Tranberg), Copenhagen (2010)
- Student district (with C. F. Møller Architects, Odense, Denmark (competition win, 2009)
- Panum Institute extension (with C. F. Møller Architects, Copenhagen (competition win, 2010)
- Malmö Concert Hall and Conference Centre, Malmö, Sweden (competition win, 2010)
- Cultural Centre (with MVRDV and Adept), Frederiksberg, Copenhagen (competition win, 2010)
- Brattørkaia, Trondheim, Norway (competition win, 2011)
- Novo Nordisk headquarters (with Henning Larsen Architects, Glostrup, Copenhagen (2011)

=== In progress ===
- Herlev Hospital extension (with Henning Larsen Architects), Herlev Copenhagen (competition win, 2011)
- European Spallation Source, Lund, Sweden (competition win, February 2013)

== Memberships ==
Memberships include:

- Appointed Fellow of the Association of Danish Landscape Architects (DL). 1990
- Appointed Member of the Danish Advisory Board for the State in Artistic Matters, Committee for Clerical Art (Akademiraadets Udvalg for Kirkekunst). Since 1992
- Board Member of the Danish Road Directorate's Committee for the Future (Vejdirektoratets fremtidsudvalg). 2000–2002
- Appointed Fellow of the Danish Artists movement 'Kammeraterne', Free Exhibition's Building for Danish Artists (Den Frie Udstillingsbygning). Since 2006
- Appointed Fellow of the Danish Advisory Board for the State in Artistic Matters (Akademiraadet, Det Kongelige Akademi for de Skønne Kunster). Member of the Committee for Ecclesiastical Art 2002–2007. Chairman of the Section for Architecture 2007–2010.
- Appointed Editorial Board Member of the European Foundation for Landscape Architecture's yearbook. 2005

== Awards ==
- 2002 Topos European Landscape Award
- 2002 Eckersberg Medal
- 2003 Dreyer Honorary Award
- 2010 Nykredit Architecture Prize
- 2014 C.F. Hansen Medal
