= Association of Danish Law Firms =

Trade and employers' organization in Denmark

- Formation: 2008
- Legal status: Non-profit organization
- Purpose: Danish shipping industry
- Location: Vesterbrogade 32, Copenhagen
- Region served: Denmark
- Managing director: Paul Mollerup
- Chairman: Lars Svenning Andersen
- Website: Official website

The Association of Danish Law Firms (Danish: Danske Advokater) is a trade and employers’ organization for law firms in Denmark. It is a member of the International Bar Association.

== History ==
The Association of Danish Law Firms was disjoined from the Danish Bar and Law Society in January 2008 as a result of a revision of the Danish Administration of Law Act. Its first managing director was Frank Jensen. He was succeeded by Paul Mollerup in 2009.

== Building ==
The Association of Danish Law Frims is based at Vesterbrogade 32 in Copenhagen. The building is the former mid-19th century entertainment venue Valencia. The building originally fronted the street but was later hemmed in by a taller building to the front and an extension to the rear. The building is owned by Dreyers Fond and was adapted for its current use by Dorte Mandrup Architects in 2015. The transformation exposed some of the original building details. The old gabled façade, featuring three tall, arched windows, now fronts an interior courtyard.

== Activities ==
The Association of Danish Law Frims contributes actively to the law-making process by participating in the governmental hearing procedures as well as appointing members to governmental committees. It publishes the magazine Danske Advokater.
