= C. F. Hansen Medal =

Royal Danish Academy of Fine Arts award for architecture

The C. F. Hansen Medal (Danish: C. F. Hansens Medaille) is awarded annually with few exceptions to one or more recipients by the Royal Danish Academy of Fine Arts for an outstanding contribution to architecture. It is the Academy's highest obtainable distinction for an architect. It is named after the architect C. F. Hansen and has been awarded since 1830.

== Recipients ==
Year	Recipient
1833	Michael Gottlieb Bindesbøll; Ferdinand Thielemann
1835	Niels Sigfred Nebelong
1838	Laurits Albert Winstrup
1841	Harald Conrad Stilling
1850	Ferdinand Meldahl
1856	Christian V. Nielsen
1859	Vilhelm Dahlerup
1875	Peter Christian Bønecke
1886	Vilhelm Friederichsen
1891	Vilhelm Holck
1893	Axel Berg
1907	Sven Risom
1914	Thomas Havning
1917	Ejnar Dyggve
1918	Charles Christensen; Christian Kampmann
1921	Marius Pedersen
1924	Peder Vilhelm Jensen-Klint
1926	Holger Jacobsen
1943	Ivar Bentsen
1945	Gudmund Nyeland Brandt
1947	Kay Fisker; C. F. Møller
1950	Ejnar Dyggve
1954	Vilhelm Lauritzen; Kaare Klint
1955	Arne Jacobsen
1963	Mogens Koch
1966	Frederik Christian Lund
1967	Jørn Utzon
1971	Mogens Lassen
1972	Børge Mogensen
1973	Peter Bredsdorff
1977	Steen Eiler Rasmussen
1978	Lis Ahlmann
1979	Vilhelm Wohlert
1980	Viggo Møller-Jensen
1982	Hans J. Wegner
1983	Jørgen Bo
1985	Henning Larsen
1986	Tegnestuen Vandkunsten
1987	Knud Friis/Elmar Moltke Nielsen
1988	Johan Richter
1989	Vibeke Klint; Erik Christian Sørensen
1991	Otto Weitling; Nanna Ditzel
1992	Inger and Johannes Exner; Gertrud Vasegaard
1993	Knud Holscher; Karen & Ebbe Clemmensen
1995	Erik Korshagen
1996	Sven-Ingvar Andersson
1998	Tegnestuen Vandkunsten
1989	Gehrdt Bornebusch
2000	Knud Munk; Hans Munk Hansen; Niels Fagerholt
2002	Grethe Meyer; Hanne Kjærholm
2003	Jørn Palle Schmidt
2004	Poul Ingemann; Gutte Eriksen
2006	Lene Tranberg; Tyge Arnfred
2008	Dorte Mandrup
2009	Kim Herforth Nielsen
2010	Erik Hansen
2011	Ulrik Plesner
2012	Jan Søndergaard
2013	Jan Gehl
2014	Stig Lennart Andersson
2016	Ursula Munch-Petersen
2017	Bjarke Ingels
2018	Torben Schønherr
2020	Signe and Christian Cold (Entasis); Dan Stubbergaard Cobe).
2023	Kristine Jensen
2024	Marianne Levinsen
2025	Bente Lange

== See also ==
- Eckersberg Medal
- Thorvaldsen Medal
- List of European art awards
