= Marianne Levinsen =

Danish architect (born 1963)

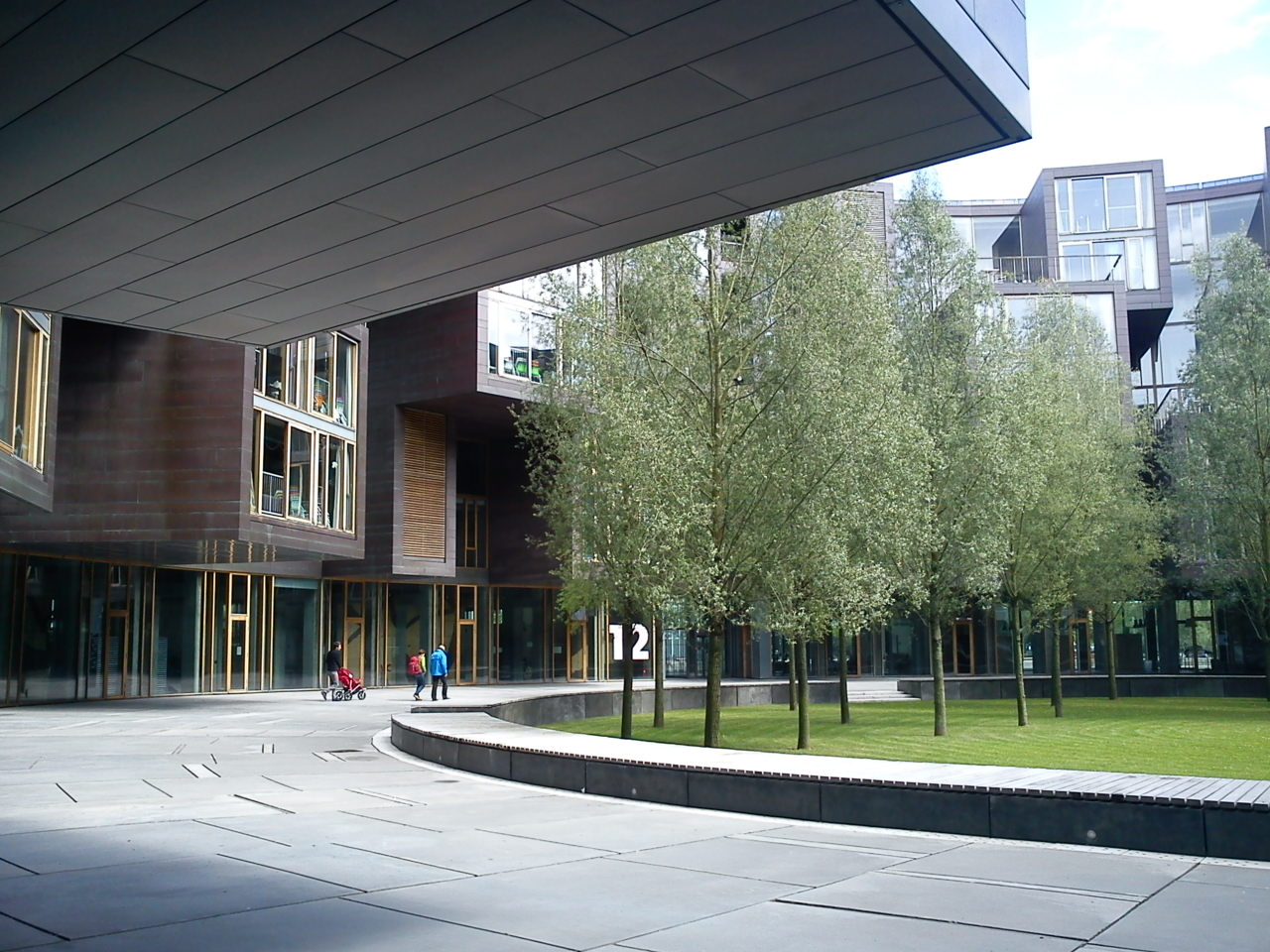
The Tietgen Dormitory atrium

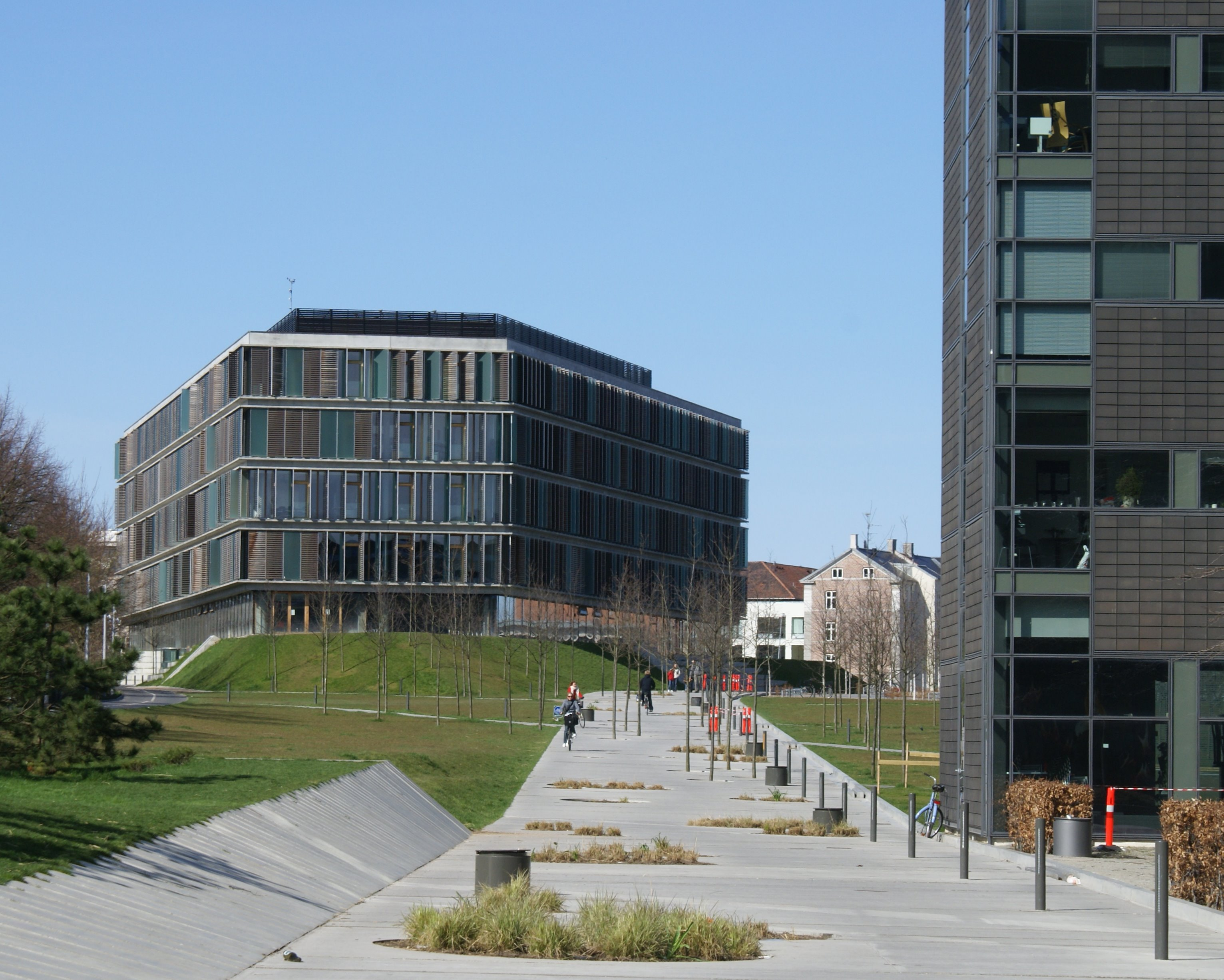
Landscaping development at the CBS Kilen building

Marianne Levinsen (born 1963) is a Danish architect who has specialized in landscape architecture. She has won several awards for her contributions to the urban space, including the Eckersberg Medal and the Dreyer Honorary Award, both in 2012.

== Biography ==
After graduating in architecture from the Royal Danish Academy of Fine Arts in 1995, Levinsen worked for the Swedish landscape architect Sven-Ingvar Andersson (1927–2007) until 2000. During this period, she also taught at the Royal Academy. Since 2002, she has run her own studio, Marianne Levinsen Landskap, based in Copenhagen.

One of her early projects was designing the central garden space or atrium for the Tietgen Kollegiet (the Tietgen Dormitory) in Ørestad where she included linden trees creating poetic light effects. In 2007, she created the landscaping around the Kilen building at the Copenhagen Business School which was commended by Frederiksberg Municipality in 2007. Other projects have included landscaping in Gentofte for both Jægersborg Vandtårn (2008) and Munkegårdsskolen (2009). More recently, she has played a major part in developing plans for Vinge, an urban development near Frederikssund.

Levinsen has also served as a judge in architectural competitions and has been a member of various committees, not only for the School of Architecture at the Royal Academy but also for the Danish Arts Foundation.
