= Kristine Jensen =

Danish architect

- Born: 1956 (age 69–70); Herning
- Education: Aarhus School of Architecture
- Occupation: Architect
- Awards: Eckersberg Medal
- Practice: Arkitekt Kristine Jensens Tegnestue

Kristine Jensen (born 14 December 1956), is a Danish architect who has specialized in landscape architecture.

== Biography ==
Jensen was born in Herning where her father was an architect. When she was 19 she went to Aarhus to study landscape architecture at the Aarhus School of Architecture, graduating in 1983. After a short period working for C. F. Møller Architects, she returned to the architecture school to undertake research leading to a PhD in 1996. From 1996, she taught at the school until in 2002 she founded her own firm, Arkitekt Kristine Jensens Tegnestue. In 2005, she won a competition for landscaping the historic surroundings of Moesgård Museum just outside Aarhus, an assignment completed in collaboration with the museum's director Jan Skamby Madsen.

Works of particular note include her urban revival of the Prags Boulevard in the Amagerbro district of Copenhagen (2006). Her studio also completed architectural landscaping in Kolding (2009) and Struer (2011). More recently she has contributed to landscaping the area surrounding the Jelling stones on the UNESCO Heritage site in Jelling, Jutland.

In 2014, her studio received Scandinavia's most prestigious architecture award, the Nykredit Architecture Prize, primarily for designing the harbour-front area of Urban Mediaspace Aarhus, surrounding the multimedia house known as Dokk1 in Aarhus. The house was finished in June 2015, but the harbour-front is still under construction.

== Publications ==
- Jensen, K.,MEGA: (MereEngagerendeGrundArkitektur), 2014.
- Jensen, K. & Sollid G., Artificial Landscapes, 2019
- Jensen, K., Bag facaden - solnedgangspladsen model og film. 21 Apr 2021

== Awards ==
- 2010: 6th Rosa Barba Award
- 2013: Eckersberg Medal
- 2014: Nykredit Architecture Prize
- 2016: Dreyer JHonorary Award for Architecture
- 2018: Landezine International Landscape Award
