= Henrik Valeur =

Danish architect and urbanist

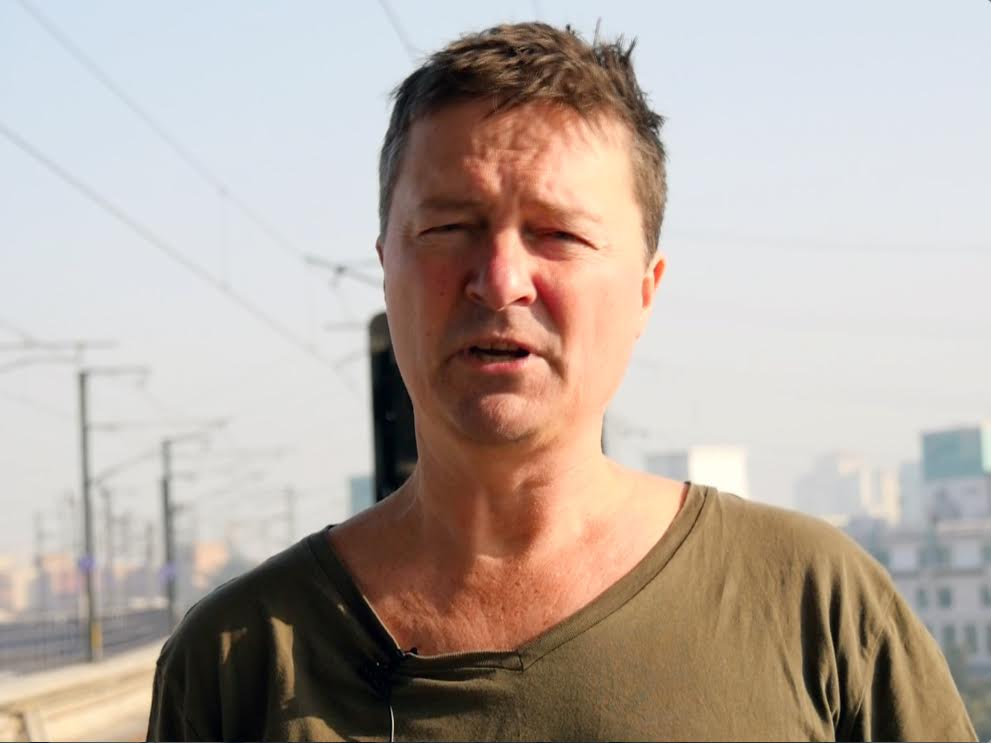
- Henrik Valeur in Delhi, 2014
- Born: 13 October 1966 (age 59); Copenhagen, Denmark
- Education: Royal Academy of Fine Arts, School of Architecture, Escuela Técnica Superior de Arquitectura de Barcelona
- Occupation: Architect
- Awards: Golden Lion (2006)
- Projects: Co-evolution

Henrik Bjørn Valeur (French pronunciation: [valœʁ]; born 13 October 1966) is a Danish architect-urbanist, founder and creative director of UiD (Denmark) and UiD Shanghai Co., Ltd (China), curator of CO-EVOLUTION: Danish/Chinese Collaboration on Sustainable Urban Development in China, which was awarded the Golden Lion at the Venice Biennale of Architecture in 2006, and author of the book India: the Urban Transition - a Case Study of Development Urbanism (2014), which is based on his experiences teaching, researching and practicing in India.

== Early life ==
Henrik Valeur was born in Denmark in 1966 to visual artist Mogens Valeur and fashion designer Birgitte Valeur. His grandfathers were both civil engineers. He grew up in Tibirke (Tisvilde), a small village located to the north of Copenhagen, and studied architecture with Enric Miralles at Escuela Técnica Superior de Arquitectura in Barcelona and at the Royal Academy of Fine Arts, School of Architecture in Copenhagen, from where he graduated in 1994. He then worked briefly for Rem Koolhaas’ Office for Metropolitan Architecture in Rotterdam.

== Career ==
=== Denmark, Sweden ===
In 1995 Henrik Valeur started out on his own making competition entries of which a few were awarded, including a proposal for a new entrance to Copenhagen Zoo and for a new university on Amager (U97), following which, in 1997, he founded UiD, a networking urban consultancy.

In 1999 he was invited to present his work at Arkitekturgalleriet, an exhibition venue for young architects at the Danish Architecture Centre. He included in the exhibition, entitled ‘99 but sometimes wrongly referred to as UiD/Henrik Valeur, not only his own work but the works of other architects,^{[i]} as well as material that is not commonly seen in architecture exhibitions. Architectural projects were not presented as unique, solitary pieces, but were mixed with commercials, news pieces, slogans and snap shots. The Danish architecture critic Allan de Waal commented:

“These are radical attempts at a new architectural practice, but almost de-illuminated. At first sight the quotations out of context or the mischievous clippings on the walls critically turn their back on the subject of architecture, away from any architectural core. But it is there! Floating somewhere in between text fragments, photos [...]”.

With Swedish architect and comedian Fredrik Fritzson, he initiated CoMa in 2001 – a research project about the newly formed Øresund Region, centered on the cities of Copenhagen and Malmö, hence the name CoMa, and the urban regions of Los Angeles and Pearl River Delta/Hong Kong. The project was based on a “diagnosis of society as a multicultural society. [T]his diagnosis becomes the frame for conceiving a new regional strategy that crosses the national borders of Denmark and Sweden, using urbanism as an integrating force”.

CoMa was exhibited, in the format of a multimedia installation, at Form/Design Center in Malmö in 2002 and at the Danish Architecture Centre in Copenhagen in 2004. In addition, the team organized a conference about the Øresund Region and contributed a sound installation to an international group exhibition at the Museum of Contemporary Art in Roskilde.

For the development of Trekroner East in Roskilde (2002–03), Henrik Valeur organized a workshop with groups of young architects,^{[ii]} artists^{[iii]} and representatives of various interest groups, the municipality, local citizens and experts, who worked together to design the landscape of this new part of the city - prior to the design of the buildings, thus making it a practical example of landscape urbanism and of a participatory and collaborative planning process.

During the early 2000s, Henrik Valeur and Fredrik Fritzon developed a series of planning tools intended to make planning processes flexible and inclusive. These tools, which include the 1:1 Sketch Model, the 4D+ Model and the Change Design Model, were demonstrated and discussed at a fair-like idea shop, which they organized for the 6th European Biennal of Towns and Town Planning in Copenhagen in 2005. Several young Danish and Swedish architecture offices^{[iv]} participated in the idea shop, which was entitled A New Future for Planning – Young Architects Show the Way!

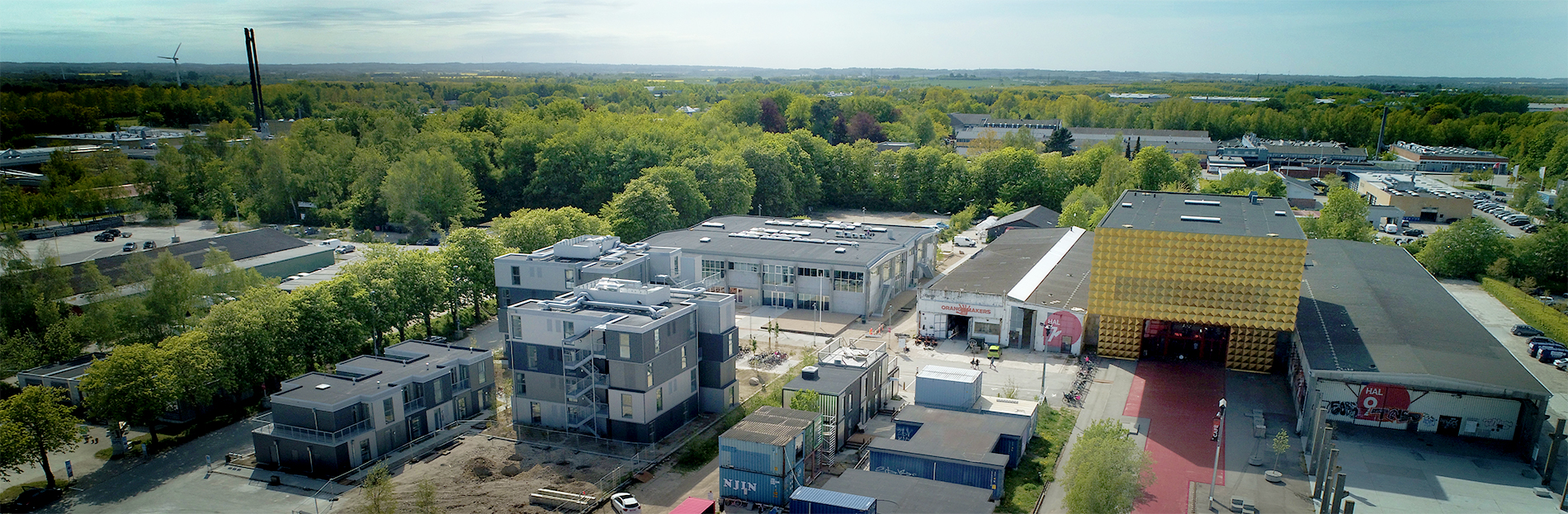
Partial view of Musicon, Roskilde

Henrik Valeur and Fredrik Fritzson's ideas of planning were implemented in the development of Musicon in Roskilde, for which they made the structure plan and the process manual, based on a scenario game and role play with local stakeholders. Roskilde Municipality was awarded the Danish Urban Planning Award in 2012 for the "exceptionally creative planning" of Musicon.

=== China ===
Henrik Valeur was appointed curator of the Danish Pavilion at the Venice Biennale of Architecture in 2006. He traveled to China where he met with universities and city administrations in several of the biggest Chinese cities. Based on the conversations he had with people there he conceived the project CO-EVOLUTION - Danish/Chinese Collaboration on Sustainable Urban Development in China in which young professional Danish architects^{[v]} and architecture students would work together with professors and students from leading Chinese universities^{[vi]} in the cities of Beijing, Chongqing, Shanghai and Xi’an. The curator and his team^{[vii]} wrapped the exterior of the Danish Pavilion in a green scaffolding, often seen on Chinese construction sites, and conducted a research project on problems and possibilities related to the processes of rapid urbanization in China, which constituted the background story of the exhibition, literally in the format of billboards mounted on the interior walls of the pavilion, with the project proposals developed by the four teams placed as free-standing installations in space. CO-EVOLUTION was awarded the Golden Lion for Best National Participation by the jury of the 10th International Architecture Exhibition, Richard Sennett (President), Amyn Aga Khan, Antony Gormley and Zaha Hadid, who said:

"We salute the creativity, intelligence, and generosity of the Danish pavilion".

Henrik Valeur was himself a member of the jury for the 7th International Architecture Biennale of São Paulo, Brazil, in 2007. That year he also founded UiD Shanghai Co., Ltd in China and was the co-curator, with Professor Pan Haixiao of Tongji University, of the exhibition Harmonious City, which included examples of Danish experiences with sustainable urban development and projects by students from Tongji University and was exhibited at Shanghai Urban Planning Exhibition Center.

Among the projects Henrik Valeur created while living in China was the Bicycle Tower, a design for vertical bicycle parking developed jointly by UiD in Shanghai and Malmö, and exhibited by the City of Malmö as part of the Urban Best Practice Area at the 2010 World Expo in Shanghai.

=== India ===
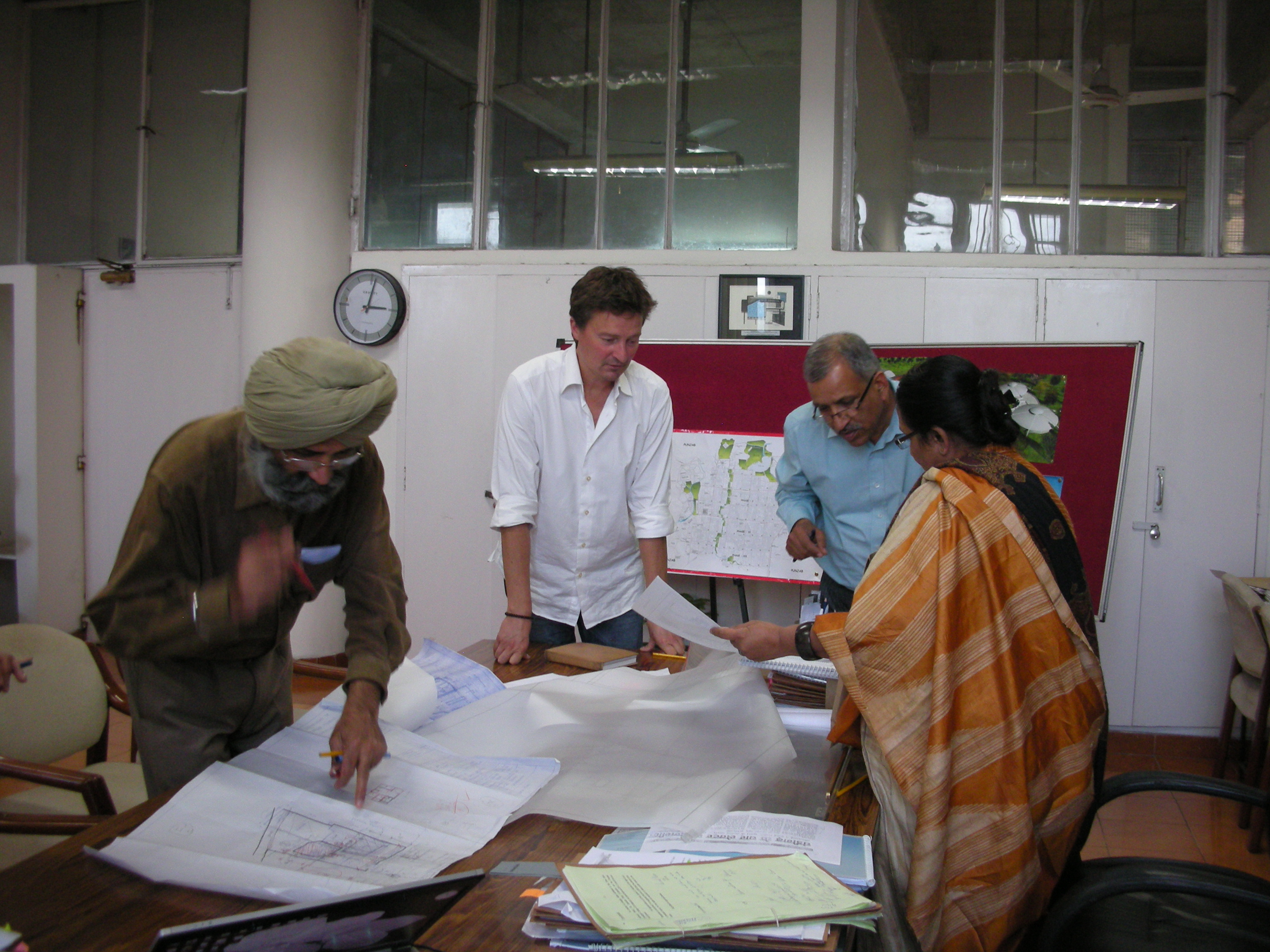
Henrik Valeur in a discussion with the Chief Architect of Chandigarh, Ms. Sumit Kaur, on the Car Free Sector Proposal, at Chief Architect's Office in Sector 9, Chandigarh

In 2010 Henrik Valeur gave the Le Corbusier Memorial Lecture in Chandigarh, in which he noted that:

“The problem with modernist architecture is not only that it tries to erase the past; it also obstructs the future!”

In the following years he worked with Indian students and researchers, activists and bureaucrats, developers and entrepreneurs,^{[viii]} and participated in public discussions about the urban transition of India. His book India: the Urban Transition - a Case Study of Development Urbanism, which is based on his teaching, researching and practicing, primarily in Chandigargh in North India and Bangalore in South India, was published in 2014. "The book contextualises city making as a complex highly political process and contends that it is the Indian city that can truly be the landscape on which the idea of India, with its diversity, flourishes".

The Indian architect Rahul Mehrotra, Professor and then Chair of Urban Planning and Design at Harvard University, called the book “an important contribution” because of its “fine grain reading of issues in the Indian city” and its “attempt to connect so many dots to make sense of the moving targets we encounter in Urbanism in India".

One of the projects featured in the book is a proposal to make one of the sectors of Chandigarh car-free. Though initially commissioned by the Chief Architect of Chandigarh for the new master plan of the city, the proposal was not realized despite the fact that the Punjab and Haryana High Court subsequently directed the City Administration to make one of its sectors car-free.

A project for the businessman and environmentalist Kamal Meattle uses natural ventilation and “growing fresh air” with plants in a vertical greenhouse to improve indoor air quality in an office building.

Other projects include a proposal for vertical kitchen gardens in a colony of rehabilitated slum dwellers in Chandigarh, developed in collaboration with a local NGO, and a proposal for self-built low-cost garden flats for current slum dwellers in Bangalore, developed with a local developer. In Chandigarh the lack of open space in the colony led to the idea of placing community kitchen gardens on top of each other. In Bangalore residents would be provided an open frame structure to be filled out by themselves according to individual preferences and possibilities. The reasoning for both projects, i.e. to provide poor people in urban settings with opportunities to produce their own food and to create their own dwellings respectively, owes a debt to the Indian economist Amartya Sen’s capability approach.

With experiences from both China and India, Henrik Valeur asks whether India can “use urbanization as a driver of economic, human and social development like China has done?”

== Concerns ==
=== Natural environment ===
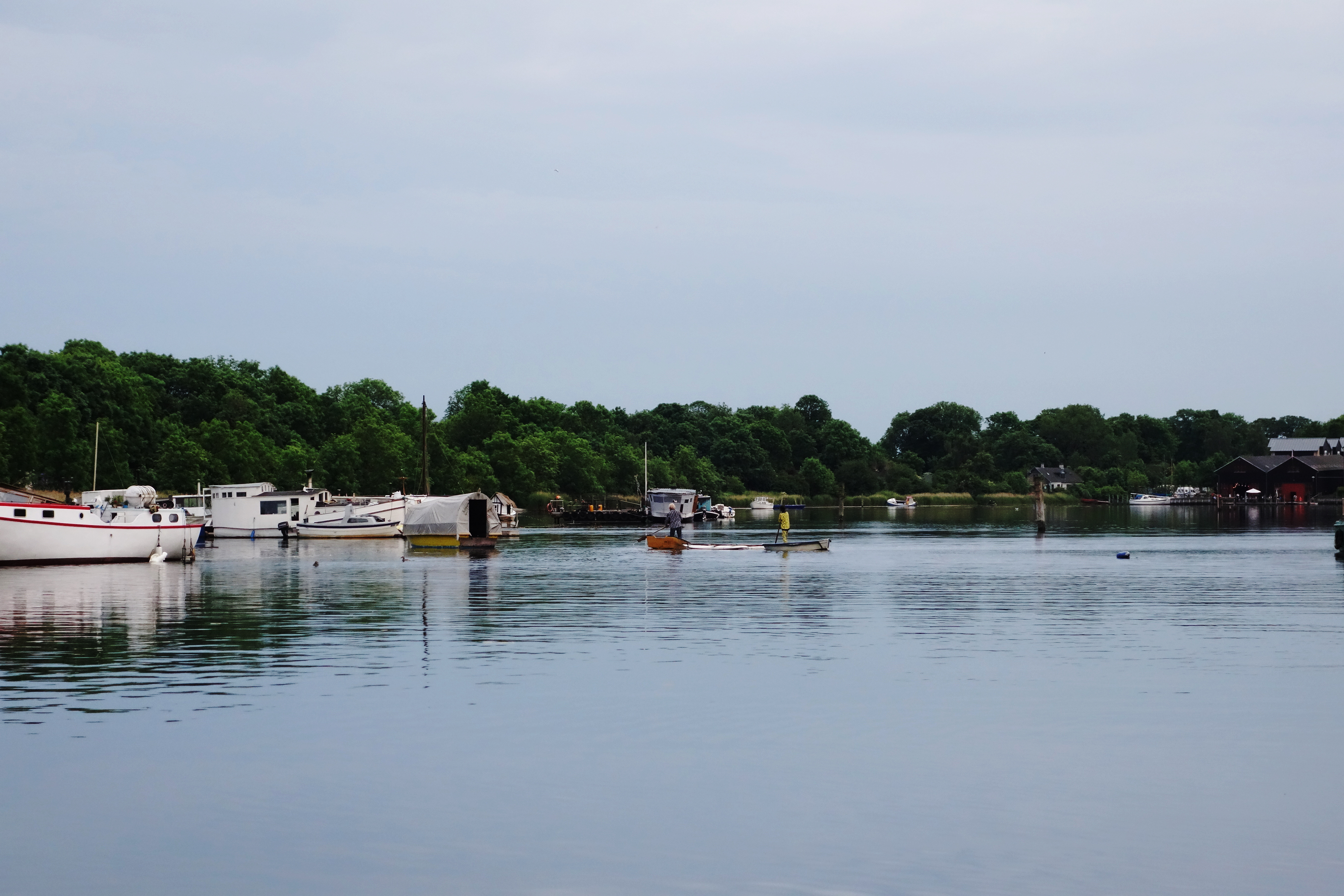
Panorama view of Fredens Havn (Harbour of Peace) in Erdkehlgraven, Copenhagen

According to Henrik Valeur, city and nature should be mixed.

In a feature article in Politiken (2009) he argued that in response to climate change, i.e. extreme weather, sea level rise and stormwater etc., ecology and urbanity must be integrated. But rather than moving the city out into the countryside, as Ebenezer Howard had proposed with his garden city concept more than a hundred years earlier, Henrik Valeur suggested that nature be incorporated in the city both physically, for instance in the form of soil and vegetation that can absorb excess water, and conceptually, in the way we think about cities. Ten years later, in another feature article in Politiken, he used Fredens Havn (Harbour of Peace), a spontaneously evolved and self-organized floating settlement in the central parts of Copenhagen, as an example of climate adapted living in the city.

The book India: the Urban Transition (2014) provides a number of proposals, including the revitalization and integration of an existing system of water canals with a new network of pathways for pedestrians in the city of Bangalore, the replacement of asphalt with natural surfaces, so-called green streets, in the city of Chandigarh and the use of plants and natural ventilation to create fresh air inside an office building, in which the plants are also used as movable space dividers with the interior planning being based on principles of self-organization.

=== Smart city ===
While in favor of urban development, as a means of creating development in the so-called "developing" world, Henrik Valeur has voiced concern about the concept of smart city floated by Prime Minister Narendra Modi in India. According to Henrik Valeur the "concerns related to the concept of smart city have to do with the issues of control and surveillance, the risk of corruption, misuse and mismanagement, and the prospect of smart cities becoming exclusive enclaves for the rich".

== Concepts ==
=== Parallel processing ===
In response to the tradition of central control and the associated principle of determinism in Scandinavian planning, Henrik Valeur, in collaboration with Fredrik Fritzson, developed the concept of parallel processing in urban planning, which was discussed at the 6th European Biennal of Towns and Town Planning in 2005 and implemented in the development of Musicon in 2007.

“The objective of parallel processing is not only to democratize the planning process, but also to let mutual understanding and inspiration generate results, which are more than the sum of the individual interests.” This should be achieved by “establishing planning processes that engage all of the parties involved throughout the entire sequence”.

Rather than involving the various actors and stakeholders one after the other at various stages of the process (a serial process) they should all be involved from the very beginning and be able to interact with each other and with the relevant authorities throughout the process (open-ended planning processes were proposed). To this end, and in order to promote flexibility and experimentation, new planning methods and instruments, such as the 1:1 sketch model, the 4D+ model, the Change Design Model, role plays and scenario games, were introduced along with the use of new information and communications technologies.

=== Co-evolution ===
In biology, “the term co-evolution is used to describe cases where two (or more) species reciprocally affect each other's evolution”.

Henrik Valeur introduced the concept of co-evolution in architecture in 2006 as curator of the project CO-EVOLUTION: Danish/Chinese Collaboration on Sustainable Urban Development in China for which he asked four young architecture offices from Denmark to work together with planners and researchers from four Chinese universities to answer the question: "How can China proceed with its ambitious project to improve living conditions for its population without exhausting the very resources needed to sustain a better life?"

By creating a framework for collaboration between academics and professionals representing two distinct cultures, it was hoped that the exchange of knowledge, ideas and experiences would stimulate “creativity and imagination to set the spark for new visions for sustainable urban development".

Henrik Valeur later argued that: "As we become more and more interconnected and interdependent, human development is no longer a matter of the evolution of individual groups of people but rather a matter of the co-evolution of all people".

=== Development urbanism ===
In 2010, Henrik Valeur wrote an op-ed in the Danish newspaper Information. In the English translation of the article the term “development urbanism” appears for the first time.

In the book India: the Urban Transition - a Case Study of Development Urbanism, which can be seen as a "call for action to everyone who wants to make a positive and concrete difference to the urban environments of developing societies", Henrik Valeur describes development urbanism as “a multidisciplinary field that is focused on sustainable urban development as a means of combating poverty and its related illnesses and of protecting the environment, the climate and the resources. It addresses basic human concerns in urban settings, seeing cities not as “dumb” machines but rather as sophisticated ecologies in which people are adapting to a constantly changing environment”.

The concept of development urbanism can be seen as an alternative to the concept of smart city. Said Henrik Valeur: “There are obviously too many unresolved problems in our cities today, but my point is that many of these problems can be solved by very simple and inexpensive means. Smart technologies are rarely necessary and may, in fact, create more problems than they solve”.

== Selected works ==
=== Books ===
- An-other City, Architectural Publisher B, 2023, ISBN 978-87-92700-45-2 (author)
- The floating community, Architectural Publisher B, 2021, ISBN 978-87-92700-36-0 (author)
- India: the Urban Transition, Architectural Publisher B, 2014, ISBN 978-87-92700-09-4 (author)
- CO-EVOLUTION, Danish Architecture Centre, 2006, ISBN 87-90668-61-8 (editor)
- A NEW FUTURE FOR PLANNING, Architectural Publisher B, 2005, ISBN 87-990146-5-3 (editor)
- '99, Danish Architecture Centre, 1999, ISBN 87-90668-14-6 (editor)

=== Exhibitions ===
- The Harmonious City, Shanghai Urban Planning Exhibition Center, China, 2007 (co-curator)
- CO-EVOLUTION, Venice Biennale of Architecture, Italy, 2006; 2nd China International Architectural Biennial in Beijing, China, 2006: Xi’an International Conference of Architecture and Technology, China, 2006; Tongji University, China, 2006; Danish Architecture Centre, Denmark, 2006-2007; AROS, Denmark, 2007; North Jytland Art Museum, Denmark, 2007; International Architecture Biennale of São Paulo, Brazil, 2007; Shanghai Urban Planning Exhibition Center, China, 2007; Cube Gallery, UK, 2008; American Institute of Architects New York Center for Architecture, USA, 2008; London Festival of Architecture, UK, 2008 (curator)
- A New Future for Planning, 6th European Biennal of Towns and Town Planning, Denmark, 2005 (co-curator)
- Check-in Öresund, Danish Architecture Centre, Denmark, 2004 (co-curator)
- '99, Arkitekturgalleriet, Danish Architecture Centre, 1999 (curator)

=== Projects ===
- Low cost garden flats, development project, 2013 (principal architect)
- Self-organizing office space: green spaces, interior planning project, 2011 (principal architect)
- Vertical kitchen gardens, development project, 2010-13 (principal architect)
- Car-free Sector 19, master plan project, 2010-13 (principal architect)
- Bicycle Tower, design project, 2008 (principal architect)
- Musicon, urban development project, 2007 (lead planning consultant)
- CO-EVOLUTION: the Collaboration, documentary film, 2006 (producer)
- Tensta collective house, competition entry, 2005 (principal architect)
- Parallel processing, urban planning methodology, 2005 (principal architect)
- Real-time-living, conceptual project, 2004 (principal architect)
- Garden flats, development project, 2003-04 (principal architect)
- Trekroner East, urban planning project, 2002-03 (lead planning consultant)
- 4D+ model, planning tool, 2002-03 (principal architect)
- Flex-bo, competition entry, 1998 (principal architect)
- U97, competition entry, 1996-97 (principal architect)
- ZOO, competition entry, 1995 (principal architect)

== Awards ==
- The Golden Lion at the 10th International Architecture Exhibition in Venice, 2006 (curator).
- The Nykredit Encouragement Prize, 2004.

== Notes ==
i. Participating architects: Alex Wall, Christophe Cornubert, MIKAN, njiric+njiric, West 8 and UiD.

ii. Participating architecture offices: Copenhagenoffice, Kollision, Plan B, Plot and UiD.

iii. Participating artists: Jonas Maria Schül, Ane Mette Ruge, Kerstin Bergendal, Katja Sander and Åsa Sonjasdotter.

iv. Participating architecture offices: Blankspace, Copenhagenoffice, Effekt, Force4, Mutopia, Nord, Testbedstudio and UiD.

v. Participating architecture offices: Cebra, Cobe, Effekt and Transform.

vi. Participating universities: Chongqing University, Tongji University, Tsinghua University and Xi'an University of Architecture and Technology.

vii. Team members: Uwe Wütherich, Zhang Meng, Annelie Håkansson, Christoffer Pilgaard, Haydar Al-Khatib, Karin Lindgren, Lea Bolvig and Ma Liang.

viii. Collaborating institutions: Chandigarh College of Architecture, Eco & Agro Resource Management, Indian Institute of Human Settlement, Indian Institute of Science (Center for Infrastructure, Sustainable Transportation and Urban Planning), Indian Institute of Technology Roorkee (Department of Architecture and Planning), Itinerant Permaculture and Shristi Space™.
