= All Saints' Church, Copenhagen =

Coordinates: 55.6624°N 12.6156°E

All Saints' Church
- The Parish Church of All Saints
- Allehelgens Kirke
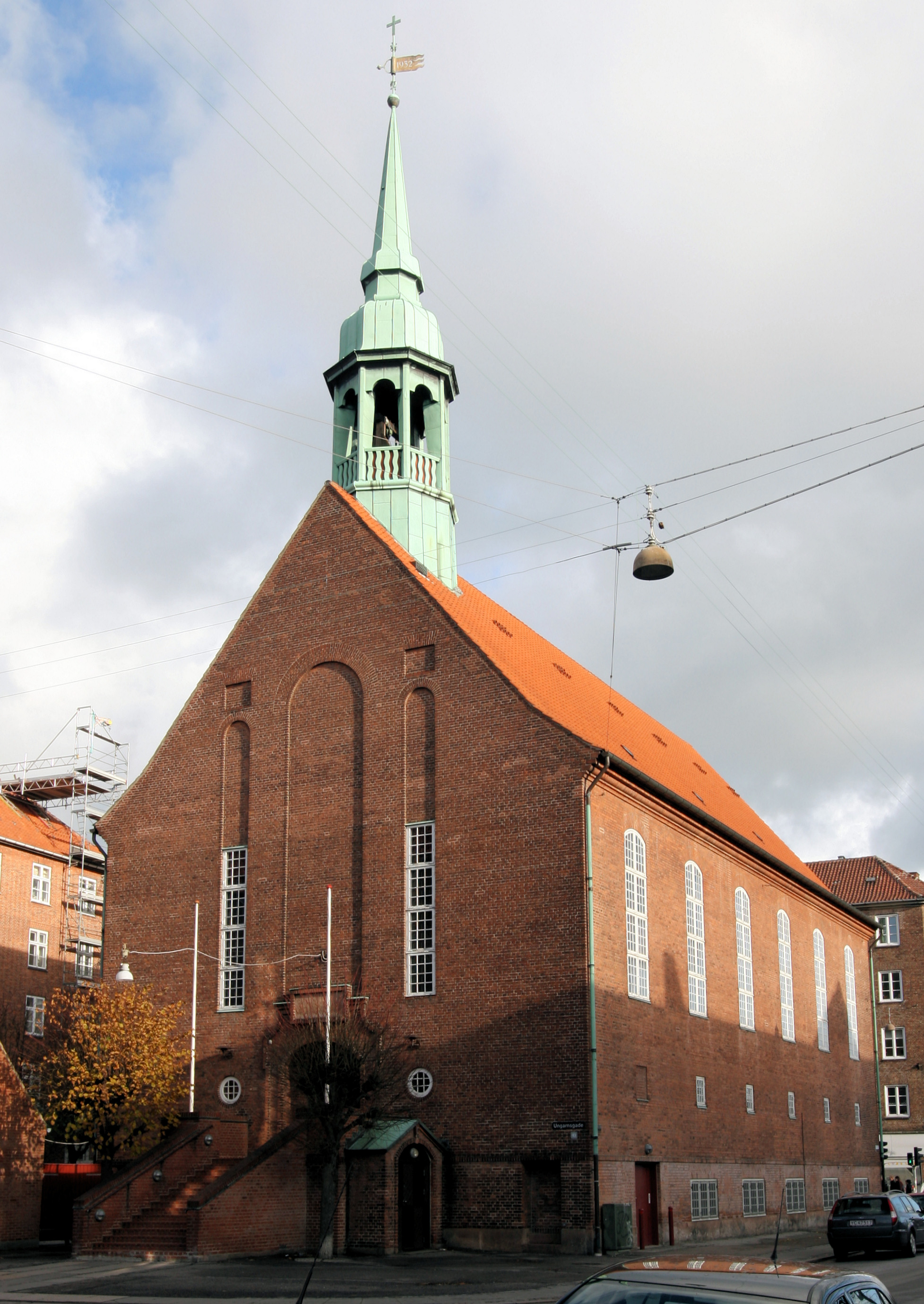
- All Saints' Church
- Location: Copenhagen
- Country: Denmark
- Denomination: Church of Denmark
- Website: Church website

History
- Status: Active
- Dedication: All Saints
- Consecrated: 25 September 1932
- Events: 1924 (Became a Parish Church)

Architecture
- Functional status: Parish Church
- Architect: Thomas Havning
- Groundbreaking: 1924

Administration
- Diocese: Copenhagen

Clergy
- Bishop: Peter Skov-Jakobsen

All Saints' Church (Danish: Allehelgens Kirke) is a church on Ungarnsgade in the Amager district of Copenhagen.

== History ==
There have been two churches on the site, the first of whose construction was funded by the Københavns Kirkefond (Copenhagen Church Fund), which also bought the land later used for it in the late 19th century. That land was made available to Nathanael's Church so that it could split part of its parish off to form a new one, since the original parish was becoming too large to manage. Thomas Havning (1891–1976) was commissioned to design the new building and he proposed an underground crypt church, whose foundation stone was laid in 1924, costing a total of 122,000 kroner.

The first building caused some anxiety, since it only rose a few metres above the ground and lay in an open field. Rapidly encroached upon by tall apartment blocks all around it, the church's congregation commissioned Havning again to build a full building with 550 seats and costing 280,000 kroner. This was consecrated on 25 September 1932. It soon became involved in the Oxford Group, prevalent up until 1940. The church was fully renovated in 1977 and 1978, whilst its most notable priest was the hymn writer Hans Anker Jørgensen (1976–1979). It is now used for meetings by a Filipino congregation.

== Sources ==
- "Allehelgens Sogn". sogn.dk. Archived from the original on 2009-02-20.
