= St. Mark's Church, Aarhus =

St. Mark's Church
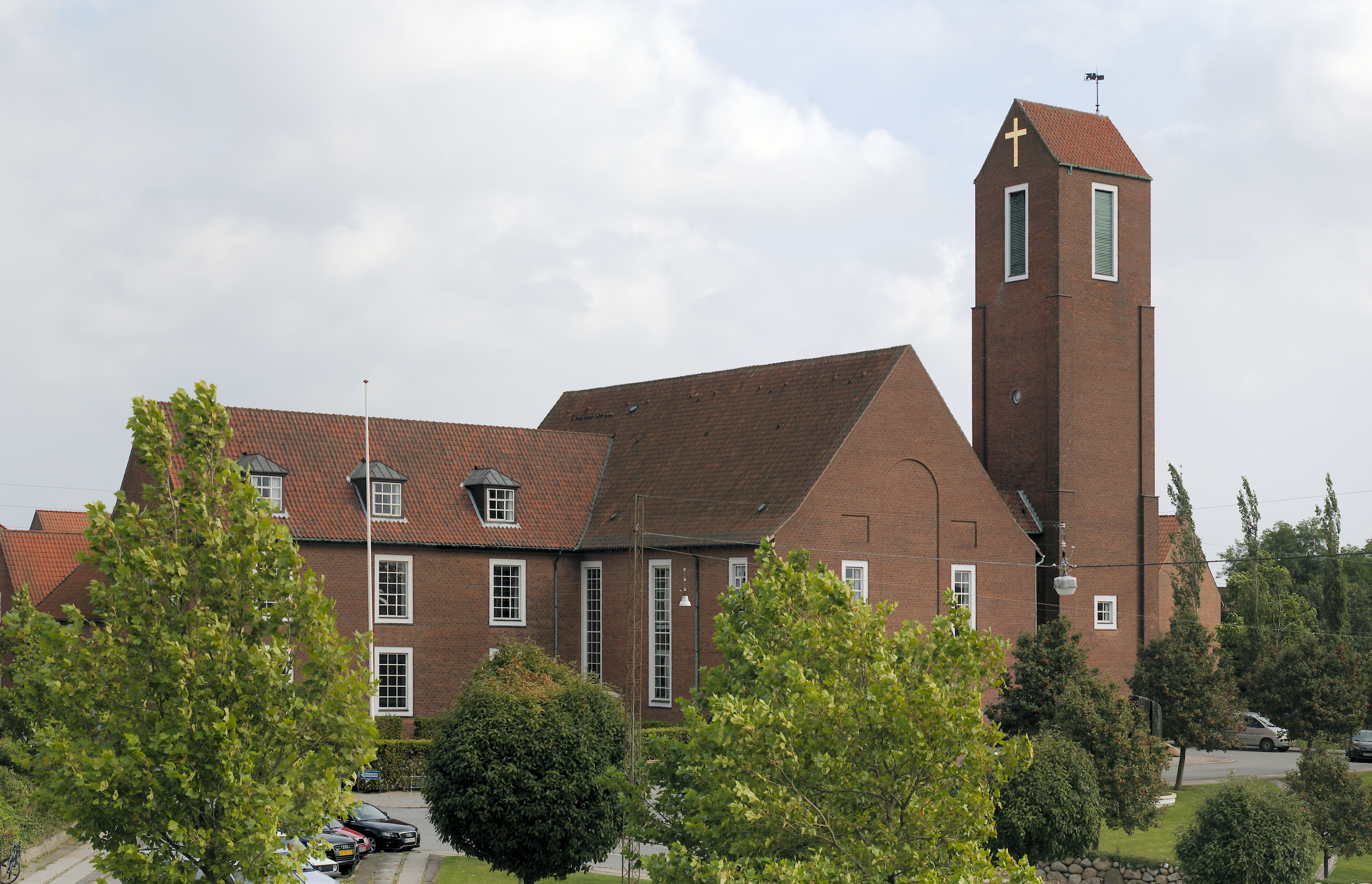
- St. Mark's Church
- 56.160712°N 10.197684°E
- Location: Aarhus, Denmark
- Country: Denmark
- Denomination: Church of Denmark

History
- Status: Church

Architecture
- Architectural type: Neoclassical
- Completed: 1935

Specifications
- Materials: Brick

Administration
- Archdiocese: Diocese of Aarhus
- Parish: St. Mark's Parish

St. Mark's Church (Danish: Sankt Markus Kirke) is a church located in St. Mark's Parish in Aarhus, Denmark. The church is located in the Midtbyen neighbourhood. It is a parish church within the Church of Denmark servicing a parish population of 8.873 (2015). The church was designed by the Danish architect Thomas Havning who won a public contest for a new church design in 1933. The parish of the Church of Our Lady was reaching a population of 10.000 and it had been decided to split it and create a new parish, requiring a new church. Construction began in 1934 and was completed in October, 1935. The church is dedicated to Mark the Evangelist. In 1982 a new wing, Klostergården, was added to the church with an office and recreational facilities for youth preparing for confirmation. In 1998 the church was extensively renovated.

== Architecture ==
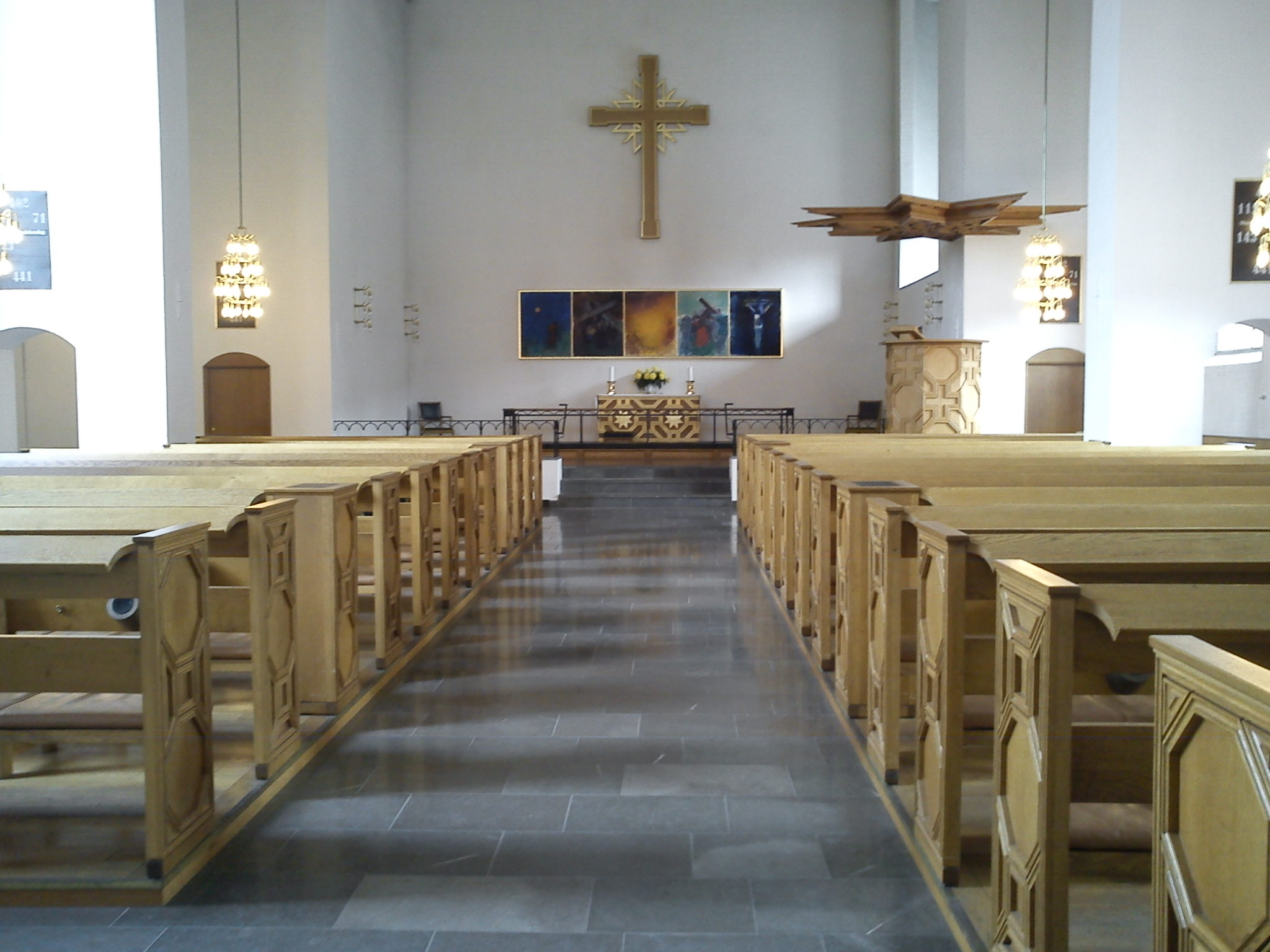
The nave

The design for the church was presented as “Mellem tvende Have” (Between two oceans) by Thomas Havning. The oceans referred to the traditional medieval church style and functionalism which was popular at the time. The church is a fusion of the two architectural styles, connecting with the past in a modern form. The result was a large and tall church with a tower in the south-west corner and with community facilities attached perpendicularly on the nave in a wing of its own.

The church is designed in Neoclassical style with a traditional pitched roof and gable. It is constructed of red brick with Nexø sandstone at the base and around windows and doors. The church room is inspired by medieval churches with the basilica and central nave elevated over the aisles. The interior is shaped by the bright, whitewashed walls and light oak used in the benches, pulpit and altar.

== See also ==
- List of Churches in Aarhus
