= Vemmetofte =

Manor house in Faxe Municipality, Denmark

Vemmetofte Convent
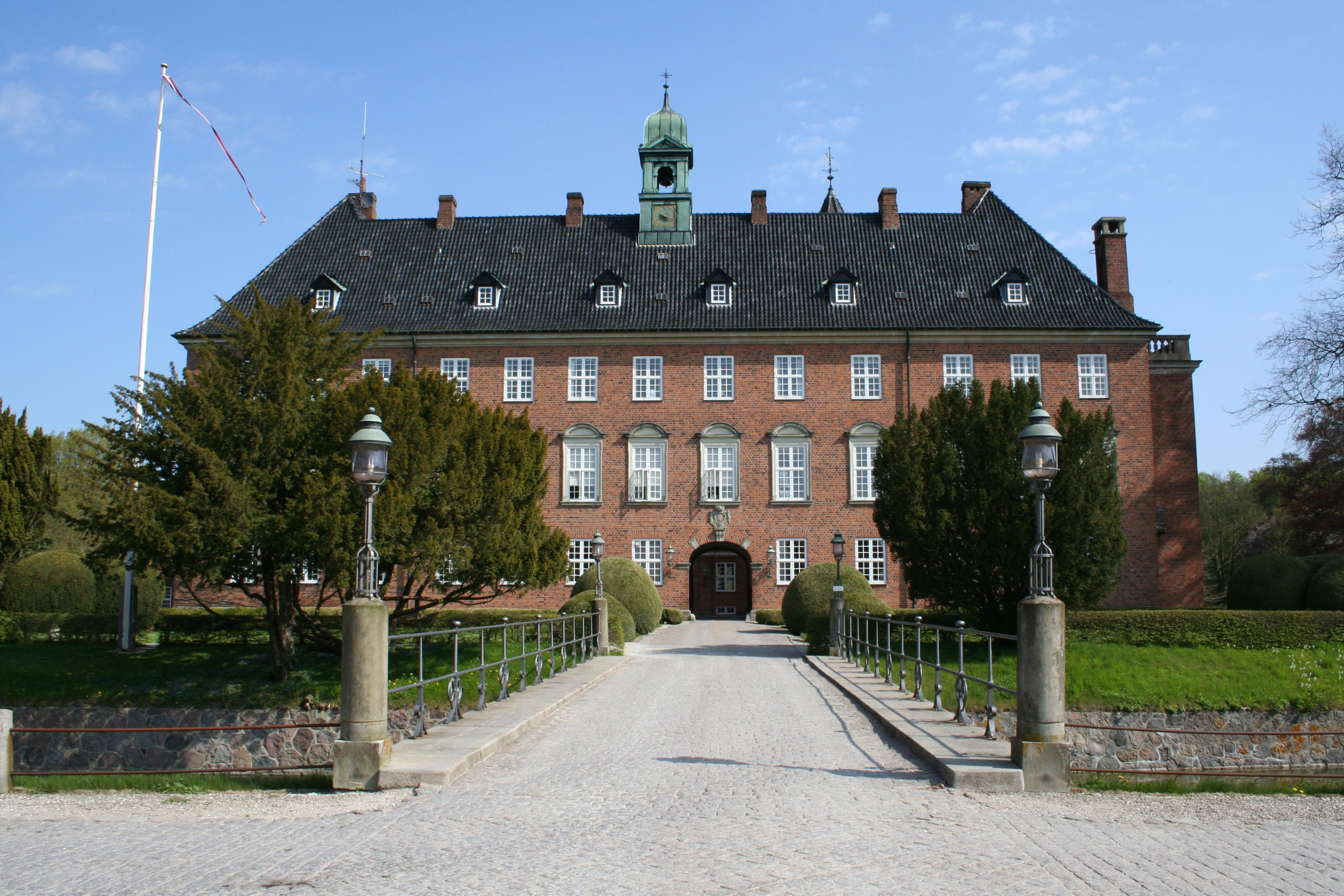
- Vemmetofte
- Interactive map of the Vemmetofte Convent area

General information
- Architectural style: Baroque (1721); Historicism
- Location: Vemmetofte, Faxe Municipality, Denmark
- Coordinates: 55.2553°N 12.2259°E
- Construction started: 1500
- Completed: 1714–21 and 1907
- Client: Prince Charles of Denmark (1719s expansion)

Design and construction
- Architects: Johan Conrad Ernst; Axel Berg

Vemmetofte Convent (Danish: Vemmetofte Adelige Jomfrukloster, Vemmetofte Kloster) is a former manor house in Faxe Municipality south of Copenhagen, Denmark. It was turned into a convent by Princess Sophia Hedwig of Denmark in 1735. Since 1975 it has provided housing available to the general public.

== History ==
=== Early history ===
The oldest known reference to Vemmetofte Manor dates back to 1320 when it was owned by Johannes Offesen, a brother-in-law of Stig Andersen Hvide who owned land both in Skåneland and on Zealand. In 1356, the estate was recorded as Væmætoftæ, which is perhaps derived from the Old Danish name Wæm, combined with the word toft (transl. croft or estate).

Later it was owned by members of the aristocratic Brock family from 1464 to 1639. During this early stage of its history it was a strongly fortified house with a ring wall, double moats and draw bridges.

After that it passed through the Brahe, Rosenkrantz and Krabbe families before it was bought by Queen Consort Charlotte Amalie in 1694 as part of a larger acquisition of land in the area. She had plans to turn the property into a convent for wealthy, unwed daughters of the nobility. However, she died in 1714 before her plans could be carried out.

=== Prince Charles and Princess Sophie Hedvig ===
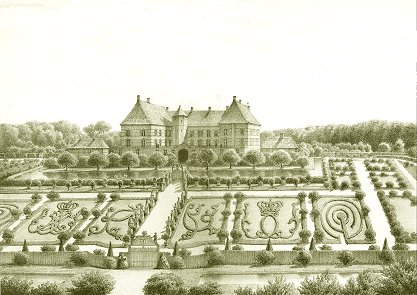
Prince Charles' Baroque garden

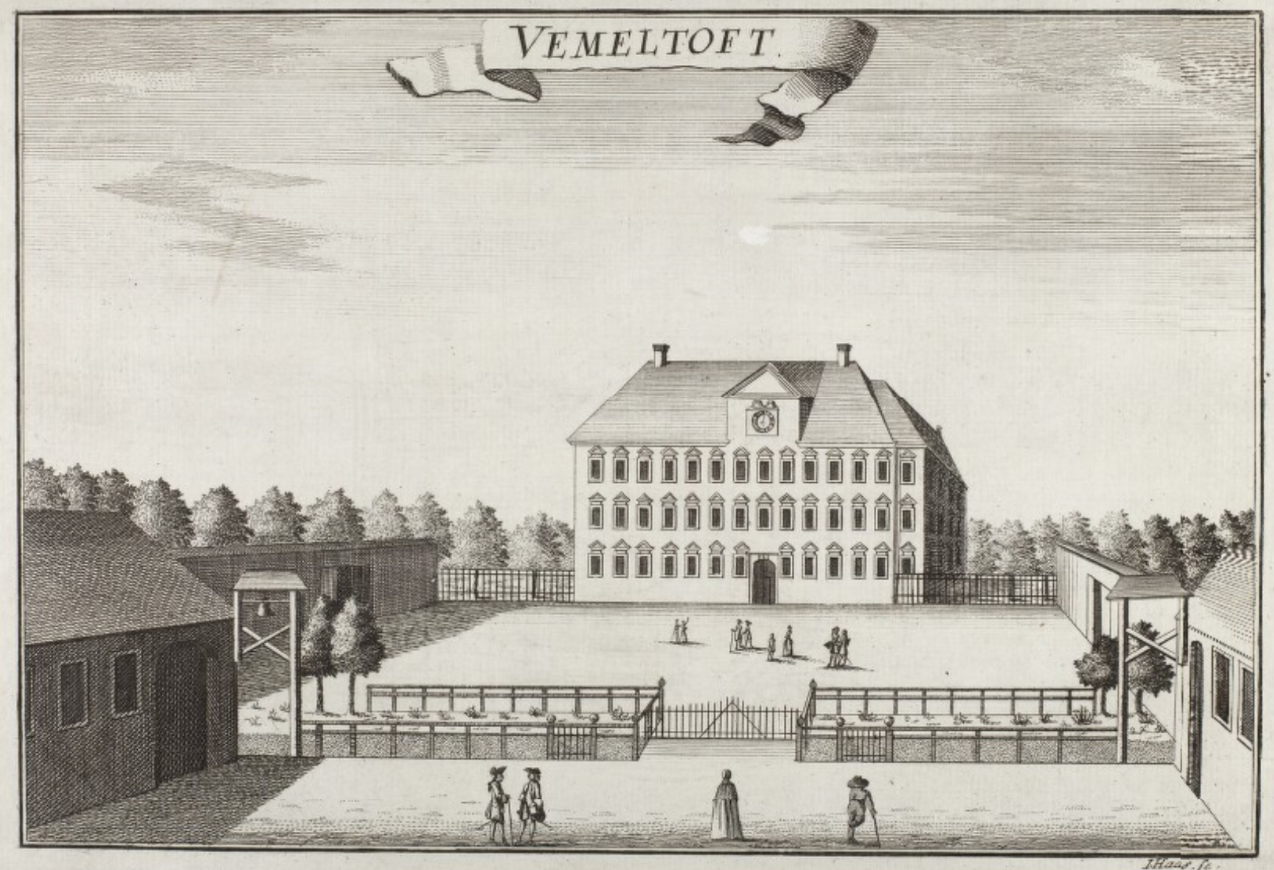
Vemmetofte depicted by Jonas Haas in the middle of the 18th century

The next owner was Prince Charles of Denmark, Charlotte Amalie's youngest son, who resided at Jægerspris Castle which he had been given by his brother, Frederick IV, who had become king in 1699. Prince Charles immediately embarked on a major renovation and expansion of his new property which it would take nine years to complete.

When Frederick IV had Anne Sophie Reventlow, his spouse by bigamy, crowned as his queen in 1721, it led to a breach between the two brothers, and Prince Charles and their sister, Princess Sophia Hedwig, showed their disapproval by turning their backs on the Court in Copenhagen and taking up residence at Vemmetofte.

At Vemmetofte Manor, Charles and Sophie Hedvig maintained an extravagant household. They had a staff of 70 people supervised by their chamberlain, Carl Adolph von Plessen, who had been a close friend of Prince Charles since their youth

=== The convent ===
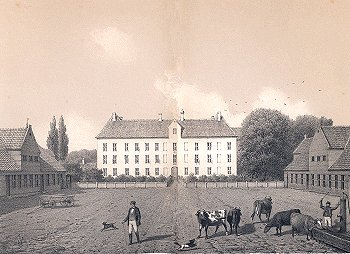
Vemmetofte prior to the 1862-63 adaptation

When Prince Charles died in 1729, he left Vemmetofte to Sophie Hedevig who provided that the estate should be turned into a convent for unmarried women of noble descent on her death. The princess died on 13 March 1738 and Vemmetofte Convent was founded the same year with von Plessen as its first curator. From the beginning the convent suffered from a constrained economy and only survived due to considerable subsidies from von Plessen.

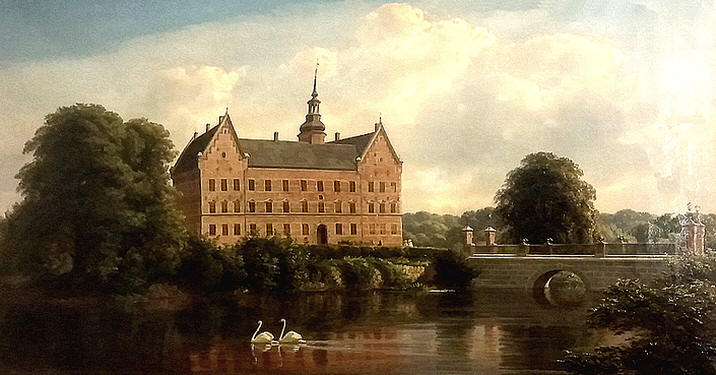
Vemmetofte after the 1862-63 adaptation

The number of women it accommodated varied over the years but was generally 11. According to the charter they either had to be noblewomen or daughters of men from the three highest ranking classes.

== Architecture ==
Vemmetofte's architecture is a result of a number of successive expansions and adaptations. The current main building was first built in 1500 and later expanded from 1600 to 1630.

Prince Charles' expansion and redesign from 1714 to 1721 was undertaken with the assistance of Johan Conrad Ernst. It adapted the main building to the Baroque style and also added a number of new estate buildings as well as a Baroque garden to the premises.

In 1882 and 1883, the architect Theodor Zeltner carried out a rather rough renovation to a Historicist style which resulted in an unfortunate attempt to recreate a Renaissance castle. In 1907, Axel Berg undertook another major renovation which completely changed its appearance.

== Today ==
Since a revision of its charter in 1975, Vemmetofte has been open to other tenants. The estate covering 2,293 hectares includes Højstrup Manor Marelundsgård.

== Churchyard ==
Notable burials in the associated churchyard include:

- Karen Bardenfleth (1892–1872), missionary
- Christian Henrik Brasch (1711–1894), writer, clergy and historian
- Carsten Friis Jespersen (1902–1988), engineer, CEO and philanthropist
- Maria Nielsen (1882–1931), headmistress and historian

== List of owners ==
- Johannes Offesen, –1349
- Jens Lauridsen Panter, 1349–
- Jens Andersen Brock
- Iven Bryske, –1421
- Johanne Nielsdatter Brock, married 1) Bryske 2) von Witzen 3) Thott, 1421–
- Fikke von Witzen, –1456
- Johanne Nielsdatter Brock, married 1) Bryske 2) von Witzen 3) Thott, 1456–
- Oluf Axelsen Thott, –1464
- Johanne Nielsdatter Brock, married 1) Bryske 2) von Witzen 3) Thott, 1464–
- Lave Brock, 1472–1504
- Lave Esgesen Brock's estate, 1504–1529
- Niels Brock, 1529–1534
- Truid Gregersen Ulfstand, 1529–1545
- Jytte Podebusk, married 1) Brock 2) Gyldenstierne, 1534–1541
- Knud Gyldenstierne, 1541–1544
- Lauge Brock, 1544–1565
- Jens Truidsen Ulfstand, 1545–1559
- Margrete Esgesdatter Brock née Bille, 1565–1595
- Jens Ulfstand, 1545–1566
- Niels Ulfstand, 1566–1575
- Sophie Podebusk née Ulfstand, 1575–1590
- Claus Podebusk, 1590–1599
- Esge Brock, 1595–1625
- Tyge Brahe, 1625–1640
- Axel Brahe, 1640–1641
- Holger Rosenkrantz , 1641–1647
- Palle Rosenkrantz, 1641
- Karen Krabbe, married 1) Friis 2) Rosenkrantz, 1641–1662
- Iver Krabbe, 1662–1666
- Niels Trolle, 1647–1663
- Karen Krabbe née Marsvin, 1666–1680
- Anne Sophie Urne née Krabbe, 1680–1694
- Margrete Krabbe, married 1) Ulfeldt 2) Rosenkrantz, 1680–1694
- Queen Charlotte Amalie of Hesse-Kassel, 1694–1714
- Prince Charles of Denmark, 1714–1729
- Princess Sophia Hedwig of Denmark, 1729–1735
- Vemmetofte Kloster, 1735–present
