= Danish Association of Architects =

Professional body for Denmark architects

Akademisk Arkitektforening
- Abbreviation: AA
- Formation: 21 November 1879
- Type: Non-profit
- Purpose: The architectural profession in Denmark, and knowledge dissemination
- Headquarters: Åbenrå 34; DK-1124; Copenhagen
- Region served: Denmark
- Members: c. 7,000 architects
- Chief Executive: Natalie Mossin
- Website: Official website

The Danish Association of Architects (Danish: Akademisk Arkitektforening, abbreviated to AA), is an independent professional body for architects in Denmark.

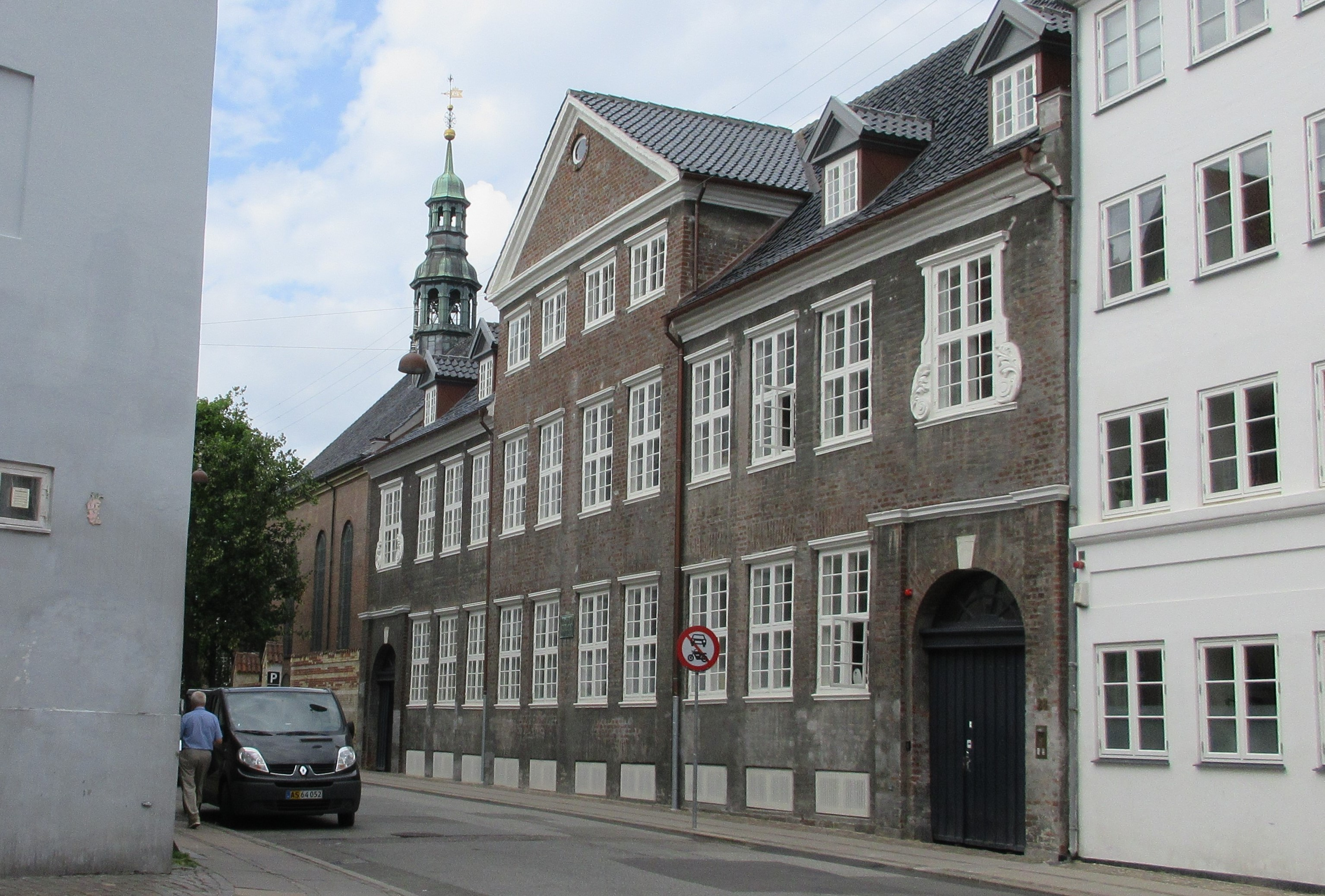
AA's headquarters at Åbenrå in Copenhagen

== History ==
The Danish Association of Architects was founded at the initiative of L. A. Petersen on 21 November 1879. The principal aim was to advance and promote architectural quality by influencing planning and design of the physical environment in the widest possible context.

Between 1951 and 2004, the Danish Association of Architects was part of the umbrella organisation National Association of Danish Architects (Danish: Danske Arkitekters Landsforbund/Akademisk Arkitektforening; DAL/AA). In 2004, DAL/AA was demerged into the Danish Association of Architects, the Danish Union of Architects, and the industry organisation Arkitekters Råd (now Danske Arkitektvirksomheder).

== Building ==
The association is based in the former rectory of the Reformed Church in Copenhagen. The building is located in the street Åbenrå. It was acquired by the property investment company Karberghus and put through a renovation in 2014. AA was formerly based in the Architects' House in Strandgade, Christianshavn.

== Presidents of Akademisk Arkitektforening/Danske Arkitekters Landsforbund ==
- 1886-18??: P.V. Ditlevsen (?)
- 1897-1900 Albert Jensen
- 1902-1904 Axel Berg
- 1904-1907 Andreas Clemmensen
- 1907-1909 Axel Berg (again)
- 1909-1913 Anton Rosen
- 1913-1917 Kristoffer Varming
- 1919-1922 Henning Hansen
- 1922-1924 Carl Brummer
- 1924-1930 Emanuel Monberg
- 1930-1930 Axel Preisler
- 1930-1937 Alf Cock-Clausen
- 1937-1942 Kay Fisker
- 1942-1946 Thomas Havning
- 1946-1951 Hans Erling Langkilde
- 1952-1955 Helge Finsen
- 1954-1960 Flemming Grut
- 1955-1961 Philip Arctander
- 1960-1966 Hans Henning Hansen
- 1966-1969 Philip Arctander (again)
- 1969-1973 Jacob Blegvad
- 1973-1976 Hans Hartvig Skaarup
- 1976-1979 Jørgen Pers
- 1979-1985 Søren Nielsen
- 1985-1991 Jens Rosenkjær
- 1991-1997 Viggo Grünnet
- 1997-2006 Gøsta Knudsen
- 2006-2010 Rikke Krogh
- 2010- Natalie Mossin

== Honorary members ==
- 1909: H.B. Storck
- 1913: Martin Nyrop
- 1922: Andreas Clemmensen
- 1924: Axel Berg
- 1927: Anton Rosen
- 1943: Gotfred Tvede
- 1943: Poul Holsøe
- 1944: Carl Brummer

== Honorary Medal recipients ==
Akademisk Arkitektforenings's Honorary Medal is awarded to architects and organisations that have made a particularly important contribution to architecture. The medal is awarded in silver or gilded silver.

=== Foreign architects ===
- Arne Eide, Norway, 21 April 1934
- Ragnar Östberg, Sweden, 30 September 1936
- Ivar Tengbom, Sweden, 2 November 1939
- Eliel Saarinen, Finland, 21 November 1939
- Hakon Ahlberg, Sweden, 17 October 1941
- Auguste Perret, France, 7 January 1949
- Arnstein Arneberg, Norway, 26 September 1950
- Magnus Poulsson, Norway, 26 September 1950
- Alvar Aalto, Finland, 5 June 1953
- Frank Lloyd Wright, United States, 16 May 1957
- Louis I. Kahn, United States, 19.9.1965
- Ludwig Mies van der Rohe, United States, 3 October 1965
- Sir Robert Matthew, United Kingdom, 8 November 1965
- Kenzo Tange, Japan, 10 October 1968
- Charles M. Sappenfield, United States, 27 November 1987

=== Danish architect ===
- Alf Cock-Clausen, 25.11.1927
- Axel Berg, 21.11.1929
- Martin Borch, 21.11.1929
- Jens Vilhelm Petersen, 21.11.1929
- Ulrik Plesner, 16.9.1931
- Emil Jørgensen, 3.10.1933
- Andreas Fussing, 4.2.1939
- Axel Høeg-Hansen, 4.2.1939
- A.S.K. Lauritzen, 4.2.1939
- Carl Brummer, 12.7.1939
- Henning Hansen, 25.4.1941
- Poul Holsøe, 20.11.1943
- Valdemar Schmidt, 9.4.1944
- Andreas Jensen, 21.8.1948
- Hans Erling Langkilde, 14.1.1952
- Knud Millech, 21.11.1954
- Helge Finsen, 28.2.1957
- Ejnar Dyggve, 17.10.1957
- Flemming Grut, 12.3.1960
- Thomas Havning, 7.10.1961
- Arne Jacobsen, 11.2.1962
- Kay Fisker, 14.2.1963
- Vilhelm Lauritzen, 9.9.1964
- Hans Henning Hansen, 2.6.1966
- C.F. Møller, 31.10.1968
- Philip Arctander, 21.1.1969
- Mogens Lassen, 25.2.1971
- Esbjørn Hiort, 28.3.1972
- Kaj Gottlob, 11.7.1975
- Edmund Hansen, 10.12.1976
- Poul Erik Skriver, 20.11.1982
- Tobias Faber, 12.12.1985
- Hans Hartvig Skaarup, 6.11.1991
- Jacob Blegvad, 21.4.2001
- Knud Friis, 7.6.2002
- Jørn Utzon, 30.11.2006
- Jan Gehl, 8.6.2012

=== Other recipients ===
- V. Eilschou Holm, 9 June 1932
- Axel Bang, 2 November 1937
- Vilhelm Lorenzen, 5 February 1957

=== Organisations ===
- Oslo Arkitektforening, Oslo, 4.9.1931
- Södra Sveriges Byggnadstekniska Samfundet, Malmø, 9.11.1932
- Royal Institute of British Architects, London, 21.11.1934
- Norske Arkitekters Landsforbund, Oslo, 7.6.1935
- Finlands Arkitektförbund, Helsingfors, 27.11.1943
- Arkitektföreningen för Södra Sverige, Malmø, 8.12.1943
- The Architectural Association, London, 17.12.1947
- Det Kongelige Akademi for de Skønne Kunster, København, 31.3.1954
- The American Institute of Architects, Washington, 16.5.1957
- Svenska Arkitekters Riksförbund, Stockholm, 23.9.1961
- Stadsarkitektens Direktorat, København, 1.11.1961
- Vridsløse Andelsboligforening, Albertslund, 10.12.1976
- Albertslund Kommune, Albertslund, 10.12.1976

== See also ==
- Danish Town Planning Institute
