= Danish Urban Planning Award =

The Danish Urban Planning Award (Danish: Byplanprisen) is awarded annually to a Danish municipality by the Danish Town Planning Institute and the Architects' Association of Denmark. The ceremony takes place at the annual Danish Urban Planning Conference.

== Recipients ==
=== 2010s ===
| Year | Recipient | Project/Motivation | Ref |
|---|---|---|---|
| 2010 | Dragør | Green-Blue Plan | Ref |
| 2011 | Middelfart | Harbour redevelopment | Ref |
| 2012 | Roskilde | Rabalderparken | Ref |
| 2013 | Copenhagen; Frederiksberg | For the Nørrebro Route | Ref |
| 2014 | Odense | Thomas B-Thriges Gade | Ref |

=== 2000s ===
| Year | Recipient | Project/Motivation | Ref |
|---|---|---|---|
| 2001 | Vejle | Municipal architecture strategy | Ref |
| 2002 | Herning | Birk | Ref |
| 2003 | Copenhagen | Havnestaden | Ref |
| 2004 | Triangle Region | 2004–2014 Triangle Regeion Strategy | Ref |
| 2005 | Horsens | Policy and strategy | Ref |
| 2006 | Aalborg | | Ref |
| 2007 | Silkeborg | | Ref |
| 2008 | Albertslund | Strategic planning with a clear environmental planning | Ref |
| 2009 | Copenhagen | Sluseholmen: For the fine proportions and emphasis of the human scale | Ref |
