= India: The Urban Transition =

2014 book by Henrik Valeur

India: the Urban Transition
- Author: Henrik Valeur
- Language: English
- Subject: Urban planning
- Genre: Monograph
- Publisher: The Architectural Publisher B (Copenhagen)
- Publication date: 1 July 2014
- Media type: Print (paperback)
- Pages: 344
- ISBN: 978-87-92700-09-4
- OCLC: 893406601

India: the Urban Transition is a book by the Danish architect-urbanist Henrik Valeur, curator of an award-winning exhibition about the urban transition of China. The book is based on the author's collaboration with activists, bureaucrats, developers, entrepreneurs, researchers and students in India between 2010 and 2014. With experiences from both China and India, Henrik Valeur asks whether India can "use urbanization as a driver of economic, human and social development like China has done?"

== Focus ==
The author discusses some of the problems related to the urban transition of India. These problems include air pollution, the contamination and depletion of fresh water resources, the precarious food situation, the lack of proper housing, and various environmental and human health problems related to motorized transportation. He also proposes some possible solutions using the cities of Bangalore in South India and Chandigarh in North India as his primary cases.

India: the Urban Transition is subtitled A Case Study of Development Urbanism. Development urbanism is described as a multidisciplinary field focusing on urban development as a possible means to combat poverty and protect the environment in the so-called "developing world". The concept of development urbanism can be seen as an alternative to the concept of "smart city". Said Henrik Valeur: "There are obviously too many unresolved problems in our cities today, but my point is that many of these problems can be solved by very simple and inexpensive means. Smart technologies are rarely necessary and may, in fact, create more problems than they solve".

== Structure and content ==
The book is made up of travel essays, opinion pieces and interviews, research papers and project proposals including many photos, diagrams, maps, plan drawings and renderings. The content is structured into four parts: 1. An introduction consisting of two chapters; one about urbanization as a driver of change, including historical references from the first civilizations to modern-day China, and one about some of the challenges and opportunities India faces with regard to urbanization. 2. Two essays about the author's experiences working in the cities of Chandigarh and Bangalore, told with text and photos. 3. The central part of the book consists of five chapters about five basic concerns of human existence and well-being in urban settings: air, water, food, housing and mobility. Each chapter discusses one of these concerns and provides a proposal to address it. The proposals include the use of plants and natural ventilation to create clean indoor air in an office building, the revitalization of an existing system of water canals, the creation of vertical kitchen gardens in a so-called rehabilitation colony, a design for self-build, low-cost housing for slum dwellers and a strategy for making an entire neighborhood car-free. 4. The epilogue is an interview with Ashwin Mahesh, a scientist who turned environmental activist, development worker and technology entrepreneur before becoming a political candidate for a newly formed political party in India. In addition, the book contains a preface, acknowledgement, references, index and credits.

== Reception ==
The Indian architect Rahul Mehrotra, Professor and Chair of Urban Planning and Design at Harvard University, called the book "an important contribution" because of its "fine grain reading of issues in the Indian city" and its "attempt to connect so many dots to make sense of the moving targets we encounter in Urbanism in India".

In a review in Urban India, published by the National Institute of Urban Affairs, the book was seen as "a commentary on the liveability of cities from the perspective of human health and safety over the long term" with observations that "appear valuable in repositioning important questions and seeking opportunities for creative solutions." The review went on to say that the book "could be criticised for leaving aside academic rigour (though parts of it are meticulous cross-referenced), but in doing so it brings to the table the value of a close-to-the-ground, interconnected way of looking at our urban fabric. It celebrates the contributions of people in a way academic literature rarely does. [...] The book contextualises city making as a complex highly political process and contends that it is the Indian city that can truly be the landscape on which the idea of India, with its diversity, flourishes. The author's use of humour and his complete honesty while describing the struggles of Indian cities with development urbanism is worthy of appreciation".

In a review on H-Net it was noted that: "In an age when star architects dominate our attention, the Danish architect-urbanist Henrik Valeur's book on India's urban transition is an important reminder to us of a longstanding parallel history of architecture and urbanism, one where architects tackle social problems through practical engagement with the built environment." The review also pointed out that although the book is "not intended as a scholarly book, [it] is well grounded in data, and supported with relevant statistics, footnotes, references, and graphs that prove the great challenges that India is facing" but "[w]hile the statistics make one confront an overwhelming urban crisis in India, through case studies, his intimate narrative orients us toward realistic solutions that can make a difference to improving people's lives in cities"."His visions for the city are inclusive of all social classes rather than schemes for gentrification" and "he encourages the reader to rethink his or her surroundings and imagine futures that would improve the neighborhood and city for all sections of society".

The book was shortlisted for the Best Bookwork of the year 2015 by the Danish Book Craft Society because it "is endowed with a refreshing contemporary graphic expression, which serves to facilitate the presentation of the drier end of the material. […] The contents' different qualities of paper – uncoated, glazed and gray recycled-twig paper – impart a most interesting and varying expression to the book. The cover has been printed on a wonderful piece of uncalendered nutmeg-stained chipboard; this fashions an exquisite organic frame around the clean and matter-of-fact typesetting."
