= Danish Town Planning Institute =

The Danish Town Planning Institute (Danish: Dansk Byplanlaboratorium) is an independent, self-owned institution based in Copenhagen, Denmark. It arranges the annual Danish Town Planning Conference and has instituted the Danish Urban Planning Award in collaboration with the Architects' Association of Denmark. The institute also arranges courses, conferences and study trips, consults Danish municipalities and publishes two magazines as well as books. Most of the operational costs are financed through income-generating activities. The rest is covered through grants from the authorities, institutions and private companies.

== History ==
The Danish Town Planning Institute was founded in 1921 with inspiration from British town planning. It was a driving force behind the Finger Plan which has governed the development of the Greater Copenhagen Area since 1948.

== Danish Town Planning Conference ==
The annual Danish Town Planning Conference (Byplansmødet) gathers urban planners and representatives of the Danish municipalities. The venue and host town varies from year to year.

== Publications ==
=== Magazines ===
The magazine Byplan has been published since 1948. Since 2003, the institute has also published the magazine Byplan Nyt.

=== Books ===
DB Publikationer is involved in publication of books and other publications on matters such as sustainability, housing policies and public planning.
