= Domkirkepladsen 1 =

Former bank building in Aarhus

Coordinates: 56.1574°N 10.2105°E

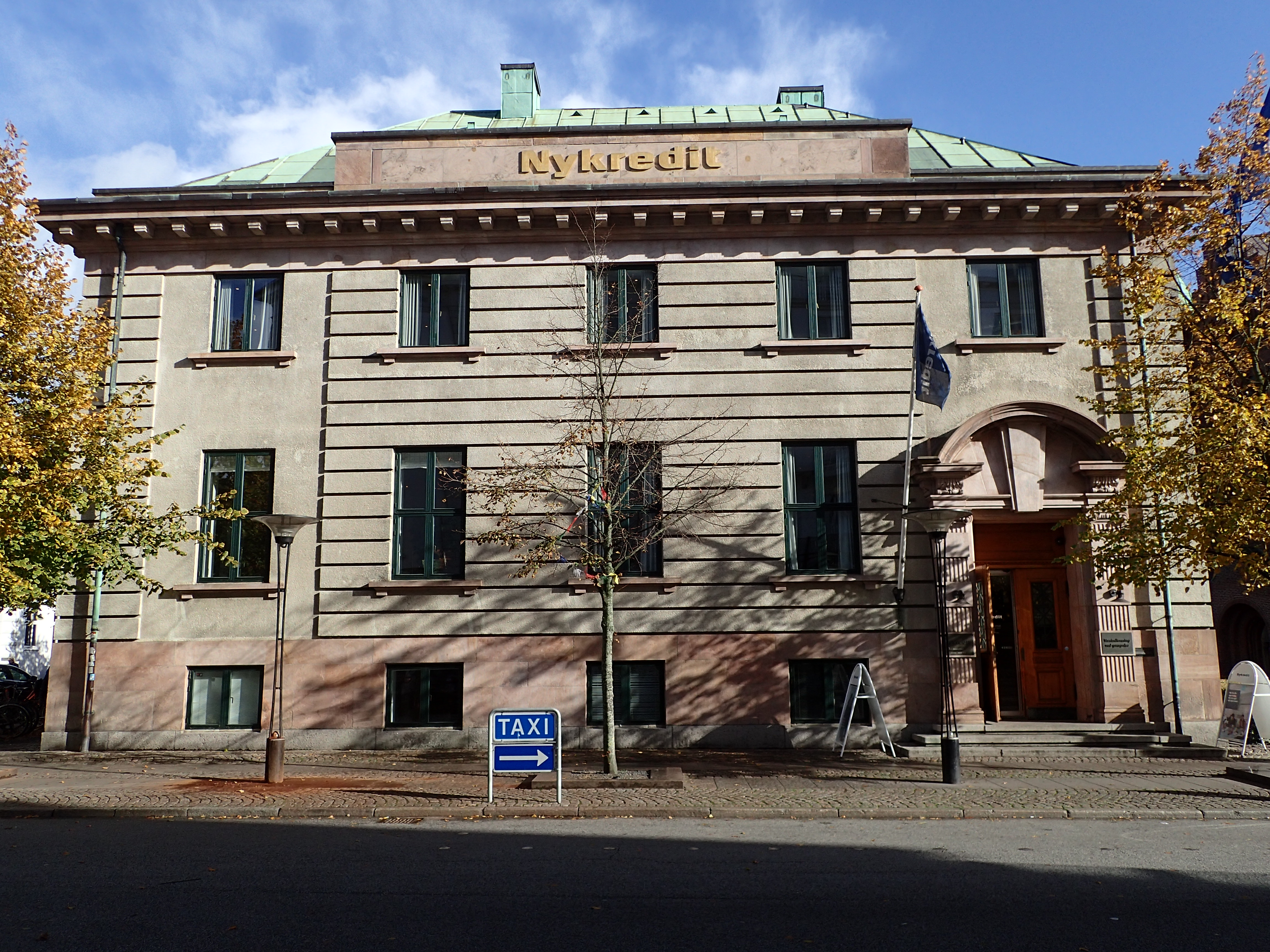
- Former National Bank branch building in Aarhus
- Interactive map of the Domkirkepladsen 1 area

General information
- Architectural style: Historicism
- Location: Aarhus, Denmark
- Construction started: 1924
- Completed: 1926

Technical details
- Floor count: 2
- Floor area: 1,038 m^{2} (11,170 sq ft)

Design and construction
- Architect: Axel Berg

Domkirkepladsen 1 is a listed building and the former Bank of Denmark branch building in Aarhus, Denmark. The bank was built in 1926 and was listed in the Danish national registry of protected buildings and places by the Danish Heritage Agency on 22 February 1996. The bank is situated on the Store Torv square in the central Indre by neighbourhood next to the cathedral where it has functioned as a bank since its completion until today. The building is no longer in use by the Bank of Denmark but still functions as a bank, occupied by a branch of Nykredit.

== History ==
The Bank of Denmark branch in Aarhus was established in 1837 and it was the first bank in the city. 90 years later the branch needed expansion and the architect Axel Berg was commissioned to draw up plans for a new building. The building was constructed between 1924 and 1926 and has remained almost unchanged since then apart from a minor expansion. Archaeologists from Moesgård Museum have excavated the basement and area around the building where evidence of Viking Age structures and church buildings from the Middle Ages. The Bank of Denmark left the building in 1989 and one year later the building was taken over by a private bank after an extensive renovation by C. F. Møller Architects.

== Architecture ==
The building design is broadly speaking historicist, combining English Baroque with influences of Italian renaissance architecture. The building is clad in porphyry with sandstone from Nexø used for the base, cornice, attica and architraves. The low hip roof is covered in verdigris green copper plating. The interior decoration is preserved with marble floors, mahogany doors and brass railings. In the expedition room the stucco ceiling remains in original condition except for the implementation of modern halogen lamps in the 300 rosettes as a replacement for the original lights.

The design is by Axel Berg and it is the last of his works. Berg drew inspiration from Inigo Jones' interpretation of works by Andrea Palladio.

== Gallery ==
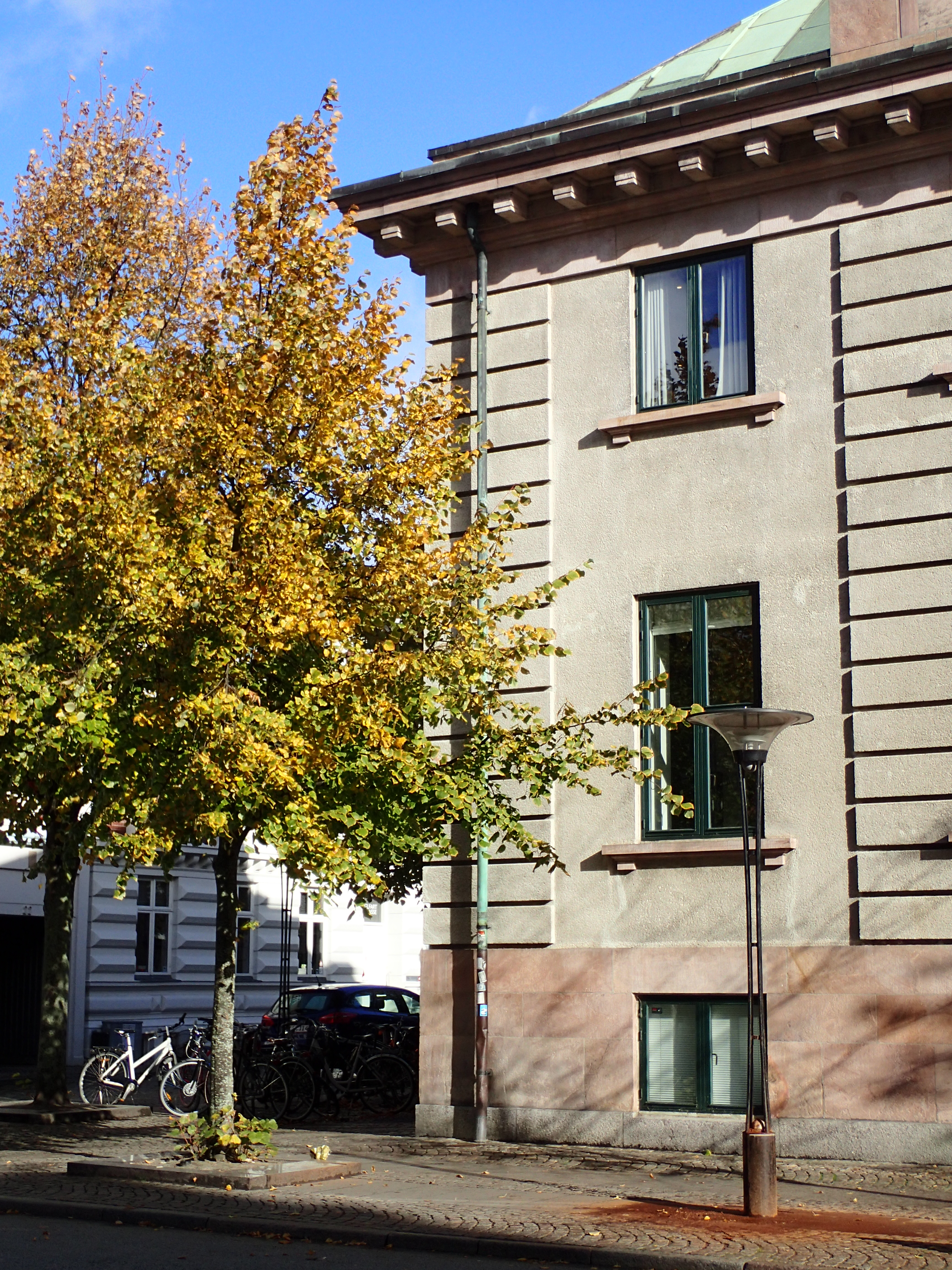

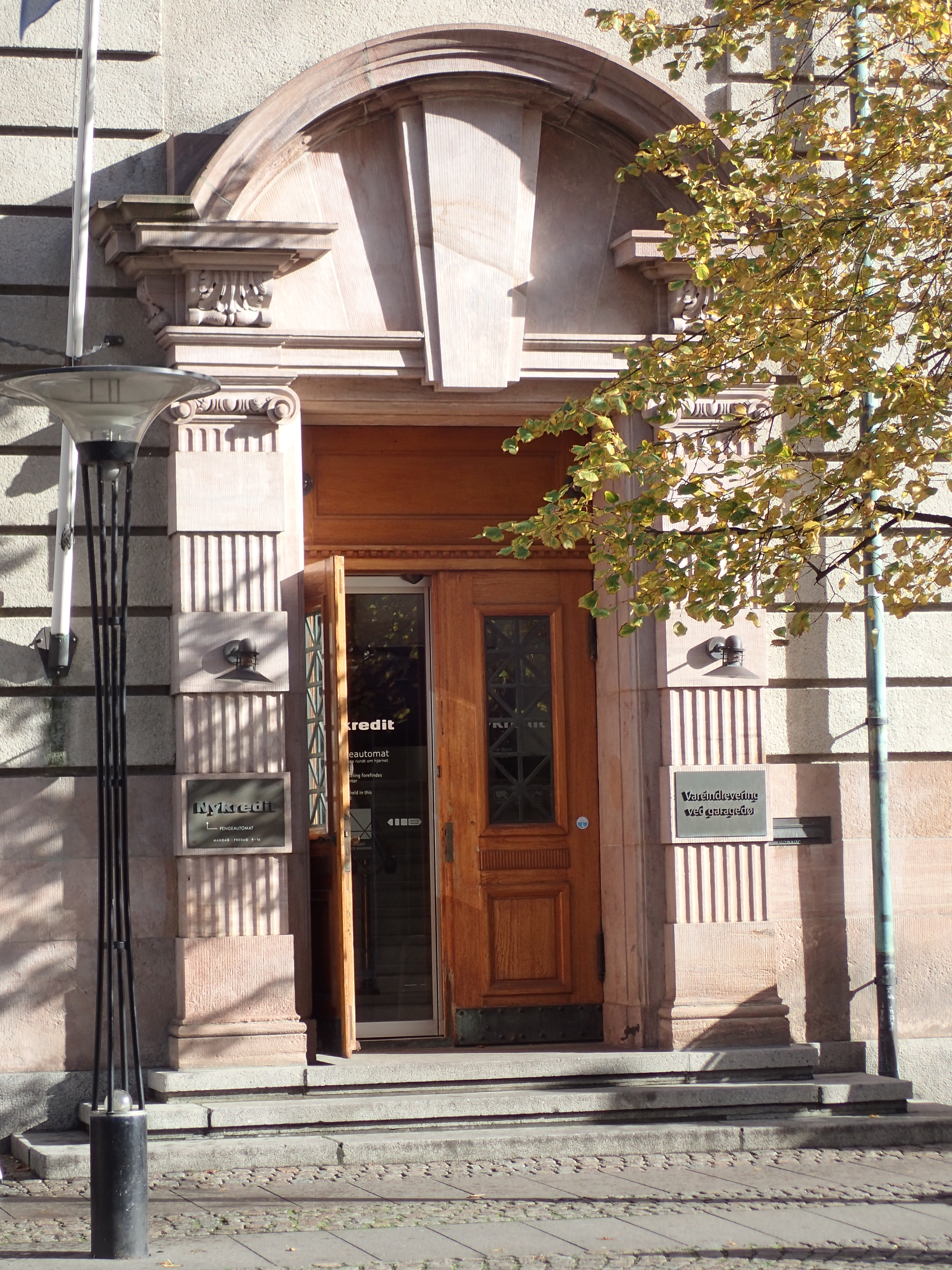

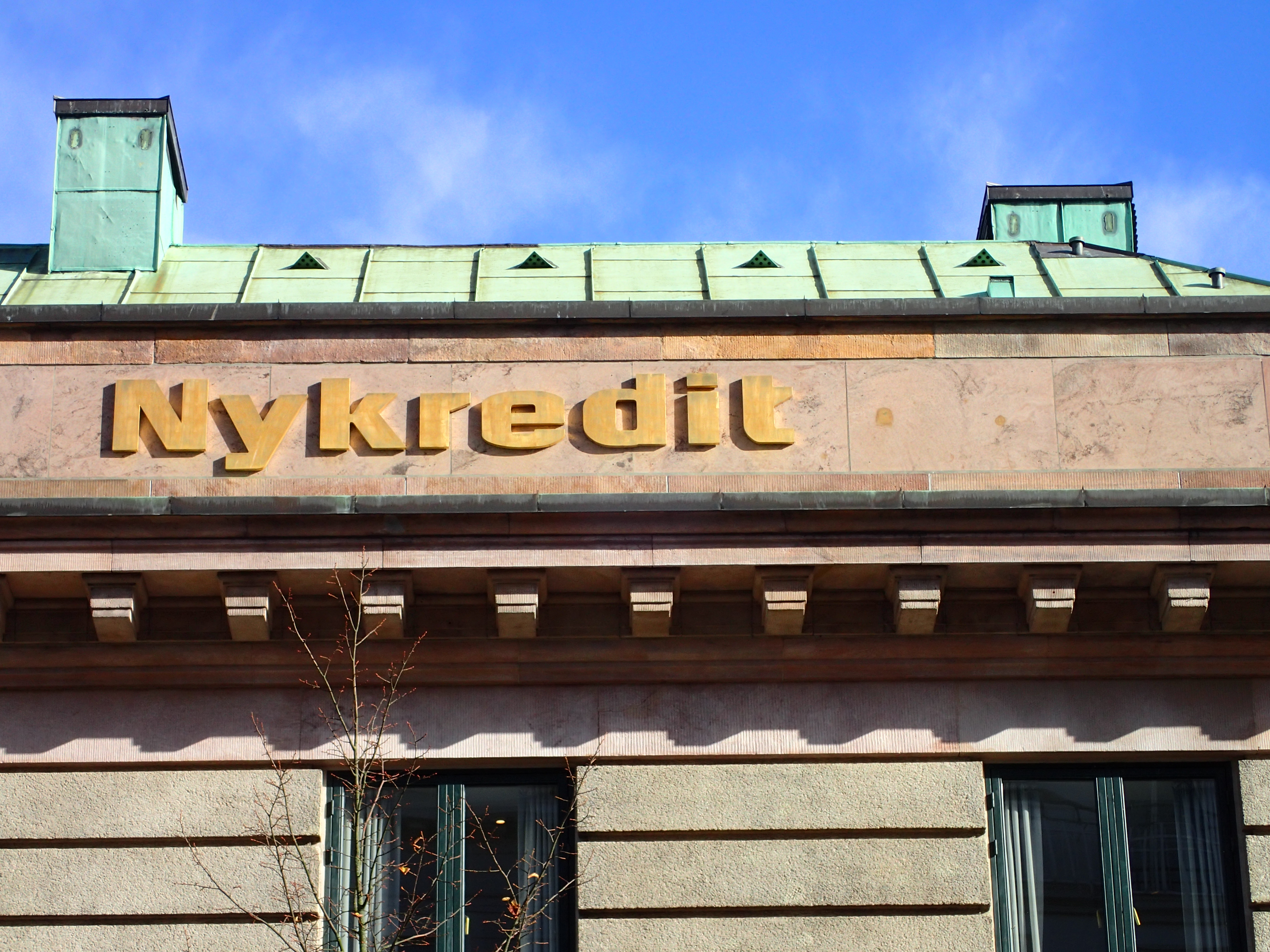

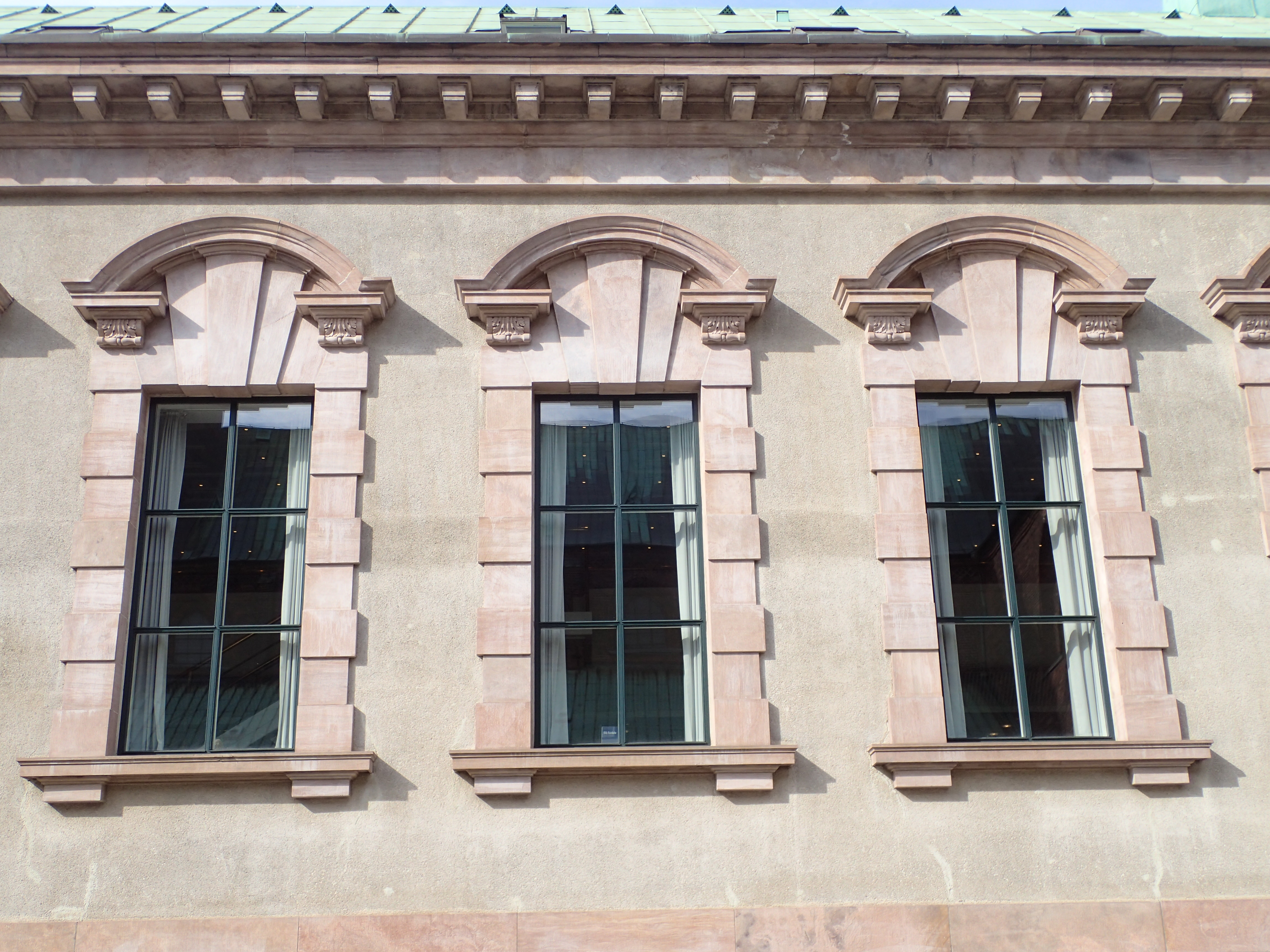

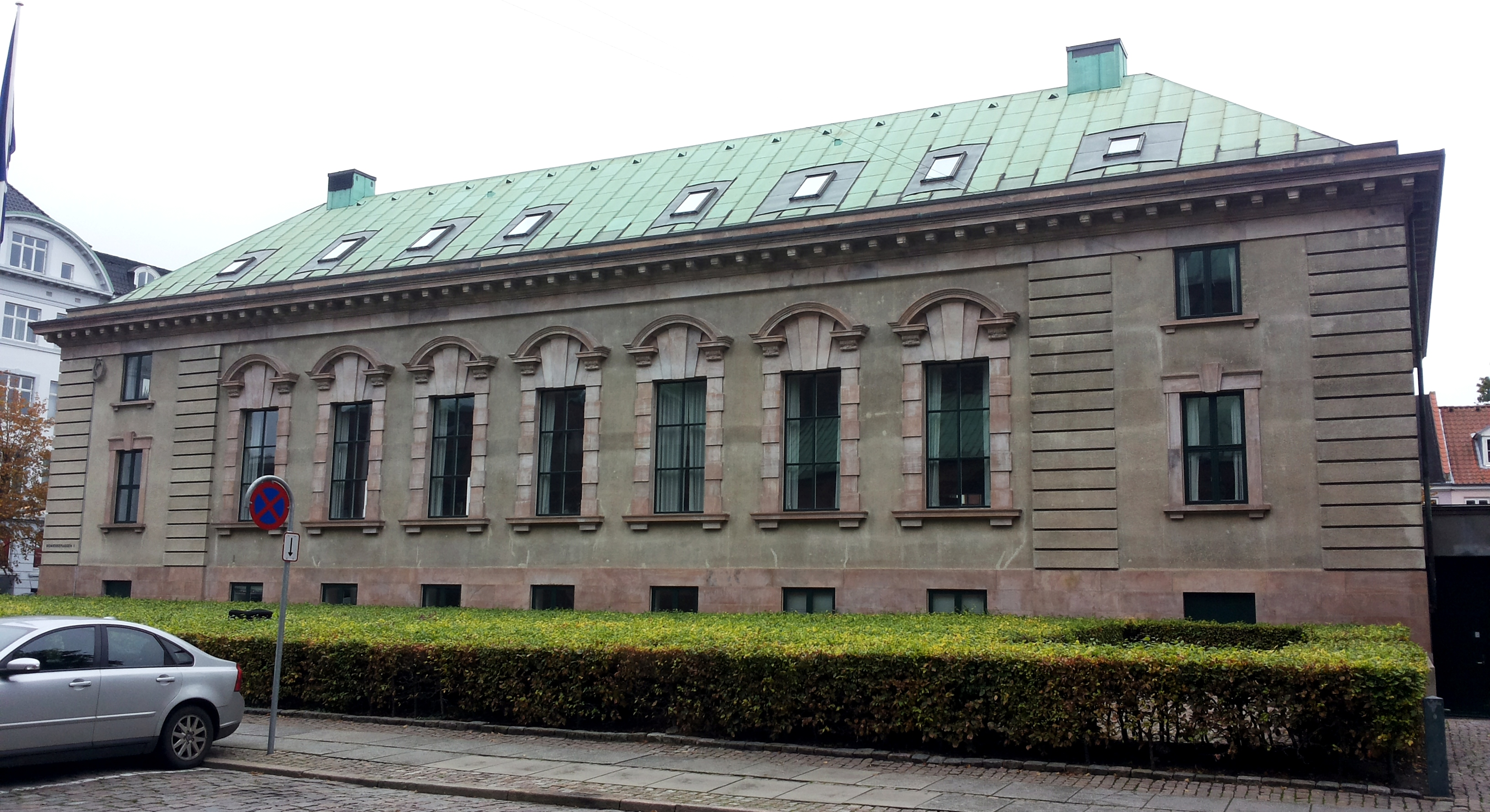

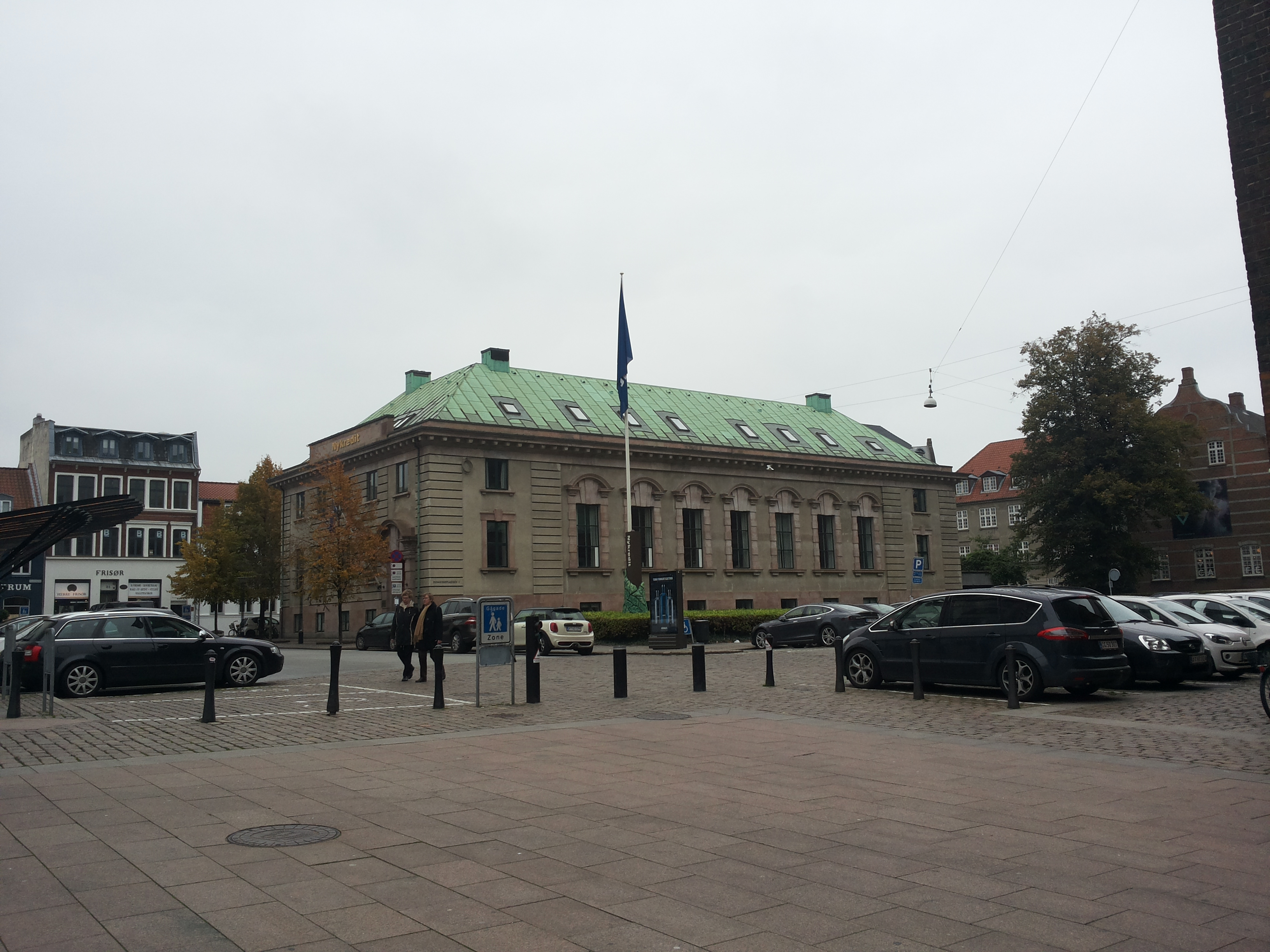
