= Thomas Havning =

Danish architect (1891–1976)

- Born: 4 September 1891; Nyboder, Denmark
- Died: 20 February 1976 (aged 84); Viborg, Denmark
- Education: Royal Danish Academy of Fine Arts
- Occupation: Architect

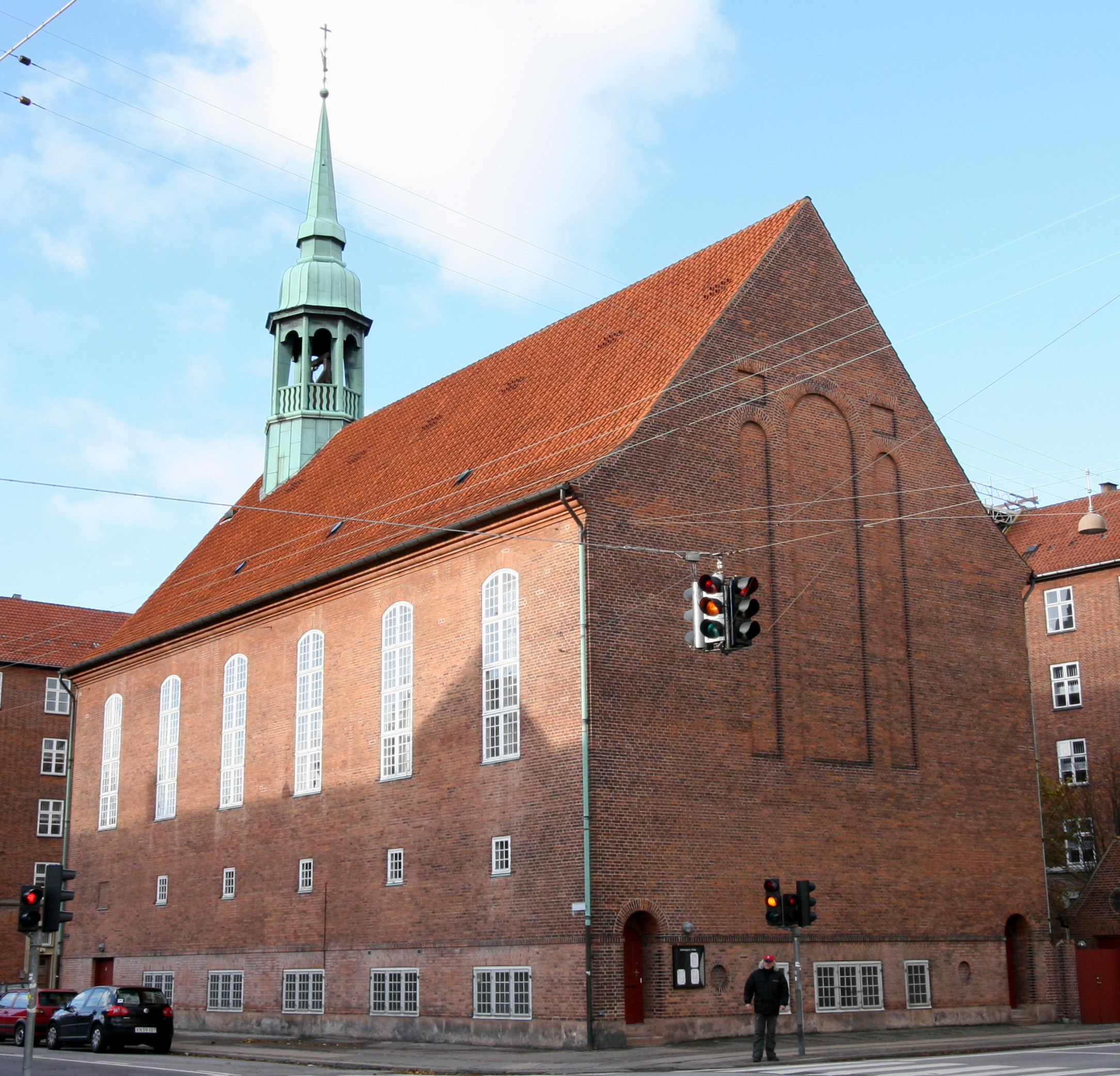
Allehelgens Church in Copenhagen from 1924

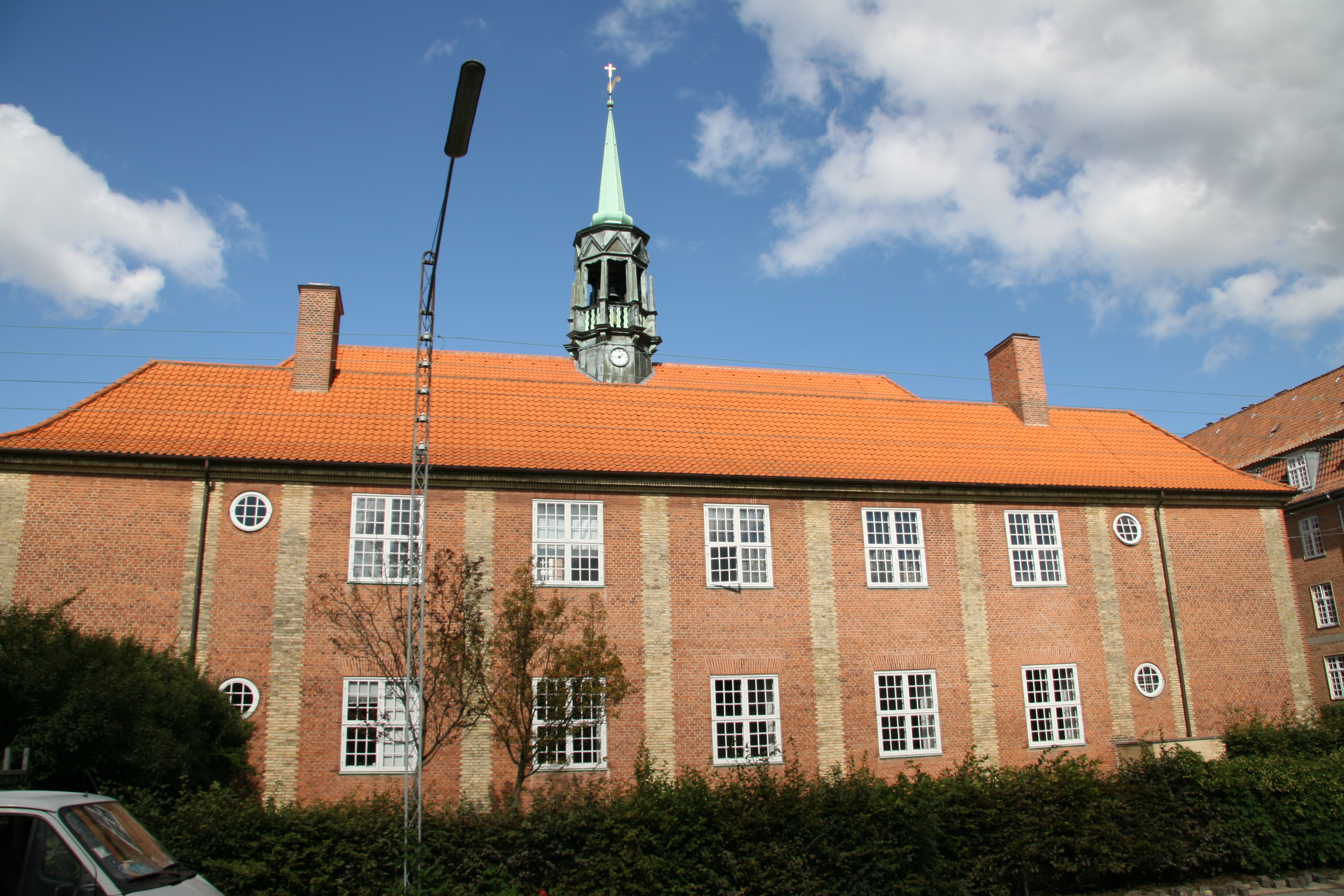
Lindevang Church in Copenhagen from 1925

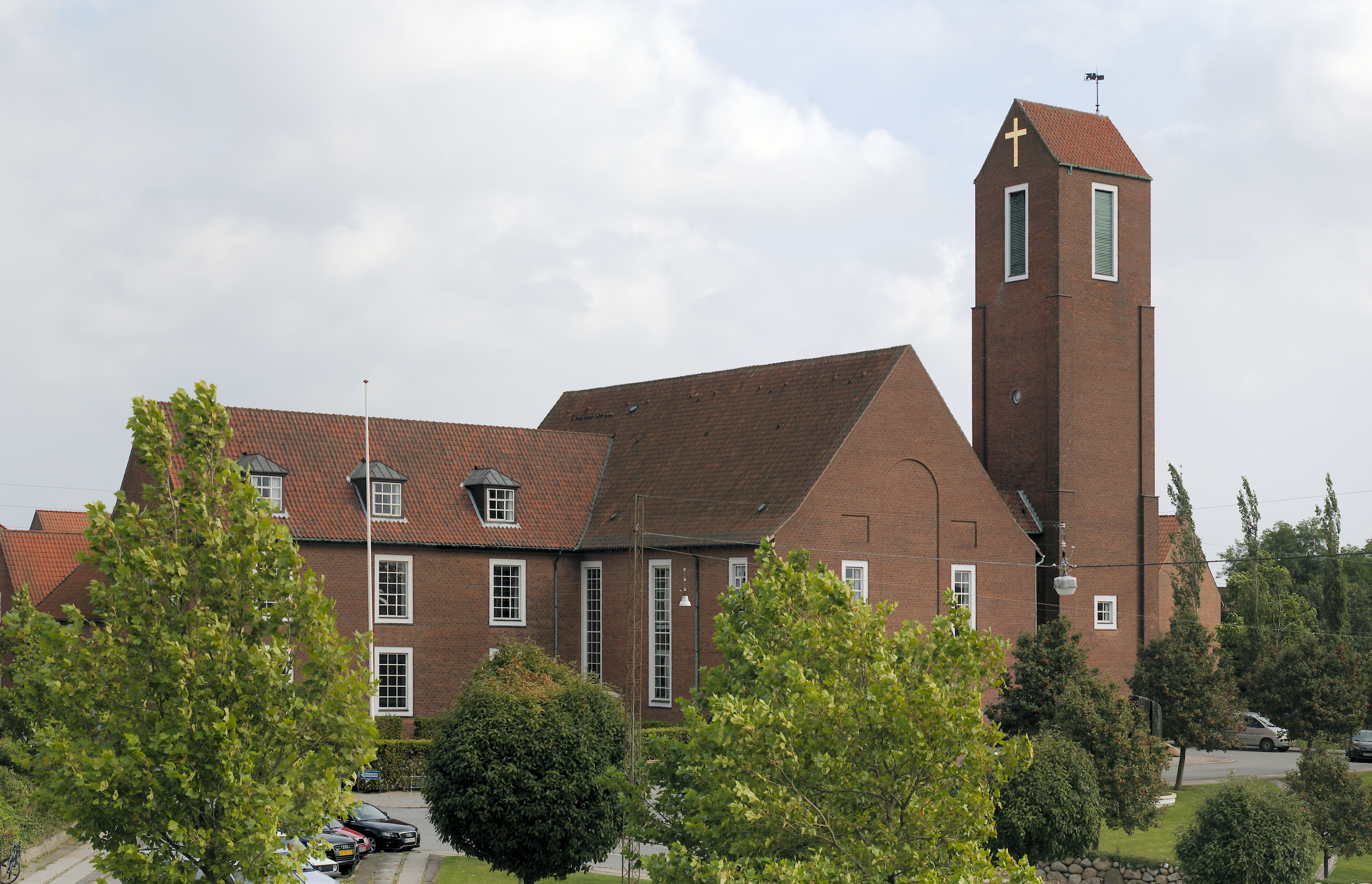
St. Mark's Church in Aarhus from 1934

Thomas Laub Hansen Havning was a Danish architect, illustrator, writer and royal building inspector born in Nyboder, Copenhagen on 4 September 1897.

== Career ==
Thomas Havning graduated from the secondary school Borgerdydskolen in Copenhagen in 1909 and was admitted to the Royal Danish Academy of Fine Arts in September 1909 from where he graduated with a degree in architecture in 1917. He was subsequently employed by Poul Holsøe and Jesper Tvede 1912-14 and by Hack Kampmann 1916]-19.

From 1920 to 1963 he was the advising architect for the Danish Ministry for Education and from 1944 to 1961 he was royal building inspector. Havning won the C. F. Hansen Medal in 1914 and the Eckersberg Medal in 1935 (for his own house in Valby). He received awards from Copenhagen Municipality in 1921, 1935, 1944 and 1951. Havning was a member of the Censorship Committee at Charlottenborg in 1920-23, 1927–36 and 1941, member of the board of the Architects' Association of Denmark 1918-23 and 1936–40, Vice Chairman in 1937-40 and Chairman in 1942-46. He received the Architects' Association's Honorary Medal in 1961.

Thomas Havning was a member of the Association for the Preservation of Old Buildings from 1937, Det Kongelige Akademi for de Skønne Kunster from 1940 to 1952, of Boligtilsynsrådet from 1940-1950, the parish council of Vor Frelsers Sogns 1922-34, of Det Særlige Kirkesyn for churches on Bornholm and in Ribe, Haderslev, Tønder and Løgumkloster.

== Style ==
Thomas Havning grew up in a family with solid traditions in the arts and crafts; he had family relations to the composer Thomas Laub and the architect Martin Nyrop. Havning's involvement with Holsøes and Tvedes architect's practice also informed his style. Combined these factors gave Havning a simple, Danish-inspired Functionalist style focused on brick as the primary material. The project which best shows his style is Havning's own house for which he received the Eckersberg Medal in 1935. the Customs- and Quarantine Building, in Copenhagen Frihavn (1942–43) and the Institute for the Blind on Østerbro in Copenhagen.

Between 1918 and 1933 Havning participated in a number of contests for church designs beginning with St. Luke's Church in Aarhus in 1918. He designed Allehelgens Church 1924-25, Lindevang Church (1925–26) and St. Mark's Church in Aarhus. The common element for Havning's church designs was a mix of Neo-Baroque architecture and Nicolai Eigtved's Rococo style.

Havning's best known work from the later, modernistic period is Tjæreborg, a building for Tobacco taxation, in Slotsholmsgade, Copenhagen. Although the copper-clad modernistic building is both elegant and adjusted for its surroundings its uncharacteristic for Havning's work where brick is usually the norm.

Havning died 20 February 1976 in Viborg and is buried on Holmens Cemetery.

== Exhibitions ==
- Kunstnernes Efterårsudstilling 1914, 1919
- Charlottenborg Spring Exhibition, 1918–36, 1941 (11 times with 6 works)
- Charlottenborg Fall Exhibition, 1922
- Worlds Fair in Paris, 1925
- Construction- and Housing Exhibition in Forum 1929
- Stockholm, 1942

== Works ==
- Design of Bispetorv by Aarhus Cathedral (1918–21)
- Villa, Kirkevænget 15, Valby (1919–20, præmieret af Københavns Kommune 1921)
- Villa, Mosehøjvej 4 A, Ordrup (1930–31)
- Eget hus, Valby Langgade 7 A (1934, Eckersberg Medal)
- Allehelgens Church (1st prize 1922, built 1924-25 and 1931-32)
- Lindevang Church (1925–26, 1929–30)
- St. Mark's Church in Aarhus (1st prize 1933, built 1934-35)
- Building on Bombroen (1941)
- Custom- and Quarantine Building, Copenhagen Frihavn (1942–43)
- Rønne børneasyl, Damgade 5, Rønne (1946–48)
- Toldkammerbygning, Havnen 13, Nexø (1946–50)
- Institute for the Blind, Randersgade 12, Copenhagen (1952)
- Falkonergårdens Gymnasium, Sønderjyllands Allé 25, Frederiksberg (1955)
- Orphanage in Tórshavn, Varda Gøta (1955)
- Treatment home Bøgholt, Bøgeskov Høvej, Aarhus (1956)
- Statens Husholdningsråds building, Amager Fælledvej 56 (1956)
- Virum Statsskole, Fuglsangvej 66 (1957)
- Regional office for the World Health Organization in Europe, Scherfigsvej 8, Østerbro, Copenhagen (1957)
- Building for Tobacco Taxation, Tjæreborg, Slotsholmsgade 12, Copenhagen (1962–67)
- School home Egevang, Egebækvej 80, Nærum (1964)
- Retirement home Egebækhus for the deaf (Egebækvej 159, Nærum (1967)
- Addition to Helligåndshuset in Copenhagen, Valkendorfsgade, Copenhagen (1967)
- Træningsskolen for arbejdsledige (Kofoeds School) at Kongelunden
- Main building of Langø
- Expansion of Bornholms Gymnasium, Rønne
- Rectories in Fuglefjord, Klaksvig, Thorshavn and Ejde on the Faroe Islands
- Dansk skole i Bredsted
- Orphanage in Thorshavn
- Dormitory for the deaf in Nyborg

== External references ==
- Ludvig Adolph Petersen on Wikimedia commons
