= Axel Berg (architect) =

Danish architect

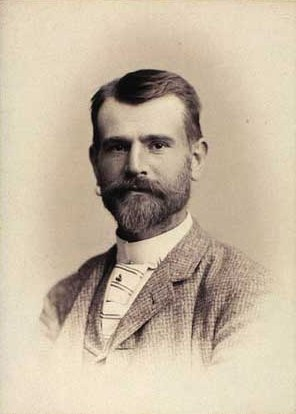
- Born: Emil Axel Berg; August 5, 1856; Copenhagen, Denmark
- Died: December 10, 1929 (aged 73); Copenhagen, Denmark
- Education: Technical University of Denmark, Royal Danish Academy of Fine Arts
- Occupation: Architect
- Years active: 1873 — 1926
- Parent(s): Vilhelm Julius Berg, Caroline Frederikke Albine Bruun
- Awards: C. F. Hansen Medal in 1893; Neuhausen Prize in 1885; Eckersberg Medal in 1910

Emil Axel Berg (5 August 1856 – 10 December 1929) was a Danish architect. He received the Neuhausen Prize, C. F. Hansen Medal, and Eckersberg Medal, and was honored as a Knight of Order of the Dannebrog.

== Early years ==
Born in Copenhagen, Berg was the son of weight manufacturer, and captain in the Copenhagen Fire Brigade, Vilhelm Julius Berg and Caroline Frederikke Albine Bruun. He studied carpentry when he was 16 but a year later, in 1873, he began studying architecture. He graduated at the Technical University of Denmark in 1877 and at the Royal Danish Academy in December 1880.

== Career ==
Berg, who practiced a Historicist approach, had a good sense of which style to use for each of his projects. His first project was the almost complete renovation of Bregentved in the Rococo style (1891), for which he was awarded the C. F. Hansen Medal in 1893. His renovation of Vemmetofte Convent (1909) was Early Baroque. He was awarded the Neuhausen Prize in 1885 and in 1910, the Eckersberg Medal. In addition to country houses, he designed a number of banks and office buildings, including Privatbanken's headquarters in various styles (1911). Berg was chairman of the Architects' Association of Denmark in 1902-04 and again in 1907–09, becoming an honorary member in 1924. He was a member of the Competition Committee for Christiansborg Palace in 1904, a consultant to the Danish Ministry of Culture in matters relating to church heating 1894–1923, and was a member of the Royal Academy's plenary session in 1911.

Berg was behind the establishment of the Architects Association Support Fund, to which he devoted much time and effort, also supporting it financially. He participated in exhibitions at Charlottenborg Palace in 1885, 1905 and 1910; a commemorative exhibition was held in 1930. Berg also participated in the Nordic Exhibition of 1888, and the Copenhagen City Hall Exhibition in 1901. He exhibited in Berlin in 1910 and 1911.

He was of the last generation of historicist architects who freely imitated or worked various historical styles. But he was not a supporter of a single style as some of his contemporaries were, However, he used the Baroque and Rococo styles as starting points. Berg never married and is buried in the Vestre Cemetery.

== Works ==
- Epitaph in Helsingør Cathedral (Neuhausen Prize 1885)
- New manor house and farm building in Bregentved (1887–1891, C. F. Hansen Medal 1893)
- Rebuilding of Marienborg Manor on Møn (1893)
- New steeple at Rosenholm Castle (1893–1896)
- Restoration of Næsseslottet in Lyngby including construction of pavilions (1896, 1906)
- Private residence, Uraniavej, Frederiksberg (1897)
- Nielsen & Winther's Engine Works, Blegdamsvej 60, Copenhagen (1897–1899)
- Privatebanken, now C. F. Tietgen's House, Børsgade 4-8 (1901–1904)
- Københavns Laane and Diskontobank, Amagertorv 24 (1904–1906)
- Knippelsbro superstructure (1906–1908)
- Rebuilding and modernization of Vemmetofte Convent (1907–1909)
- The villa Wessels Minde, Gentoftegade 9, Gentofte (1910, awarded by the Municipality of Gentofte)
- Dansk Arbejdsgiverforening (Danish Employers' Confederation), Vestervoldgade / Ny Kongensgade, Copenhagen (1910–1911)
- The Gunløg apartment block, Snorresgade / Bergthorasgade / Isafjordsgade, Islands Brygge, Copenhagen (1912)
- Branch of Danmarks Nationalbank, Aarhus (1926)
- Tomb for the builder Jørgen Jensen, Solbjerg Park Cemetery (1899, carved by Hans & Jørgen Larsen, decoration by Frederik Hammeleff)
- Tomb for Inspector Jørgen Leemeier at Holmens Cemetery (1899)
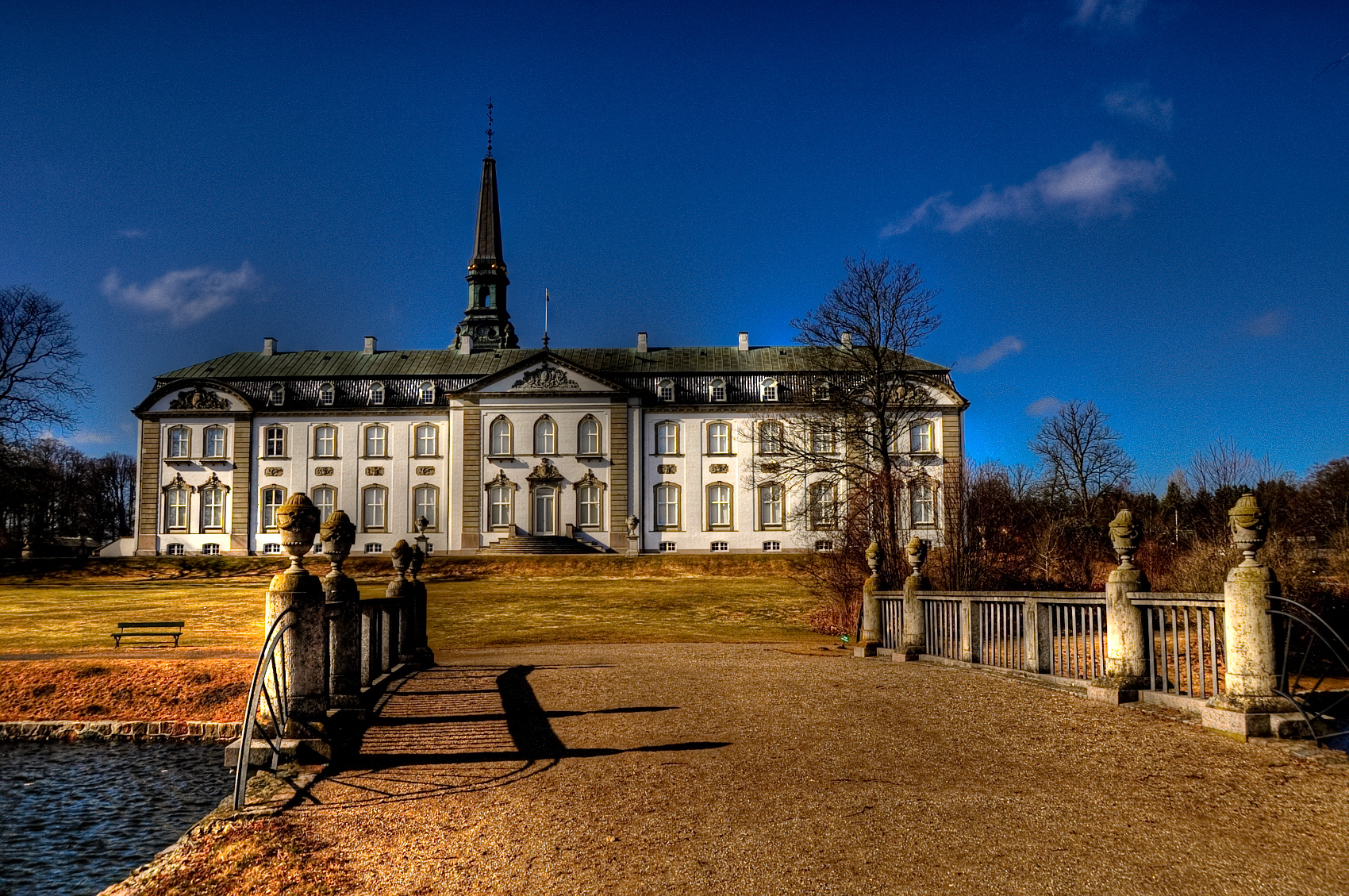
Bregentved

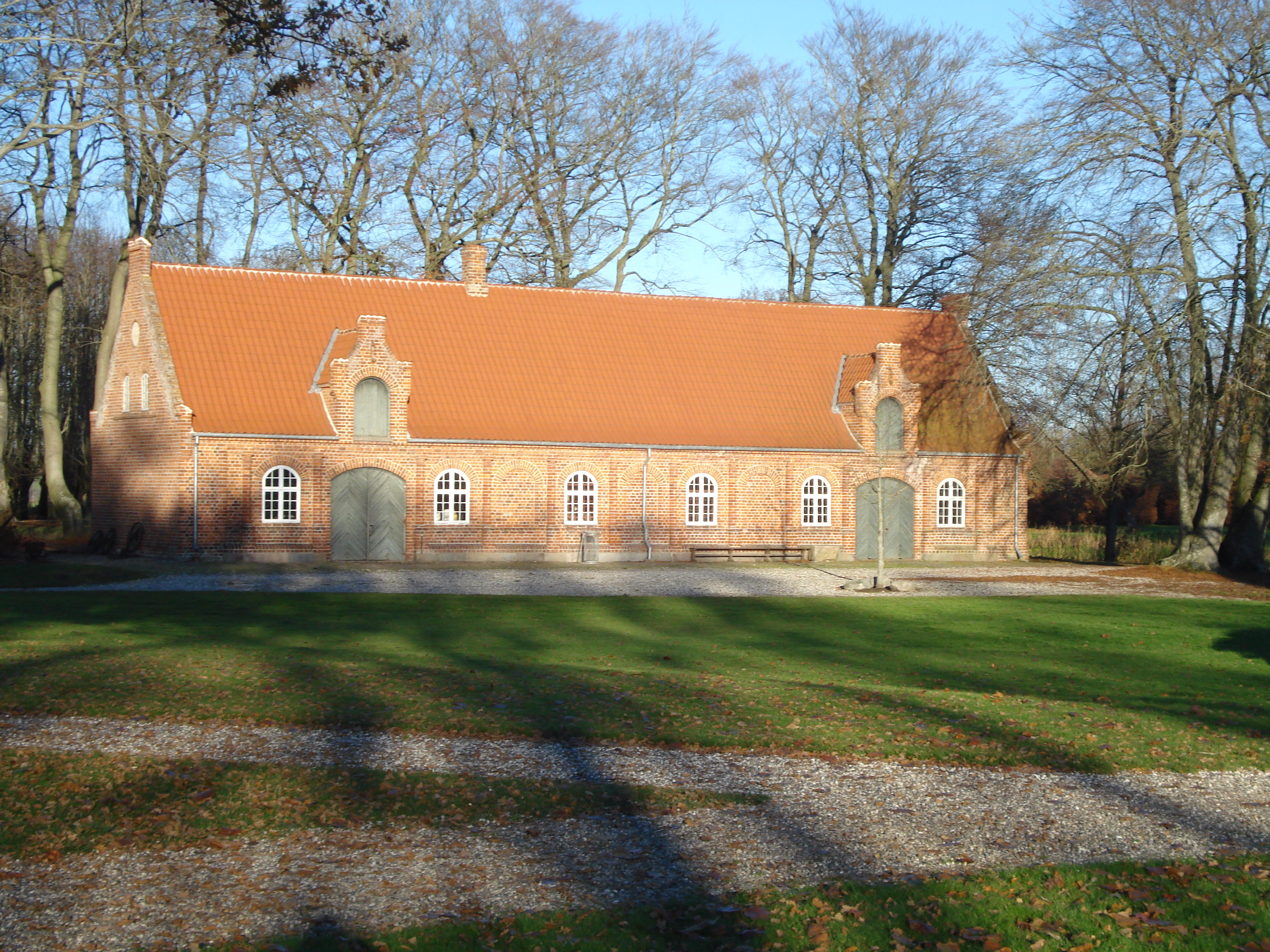
Stables at Rosenholm

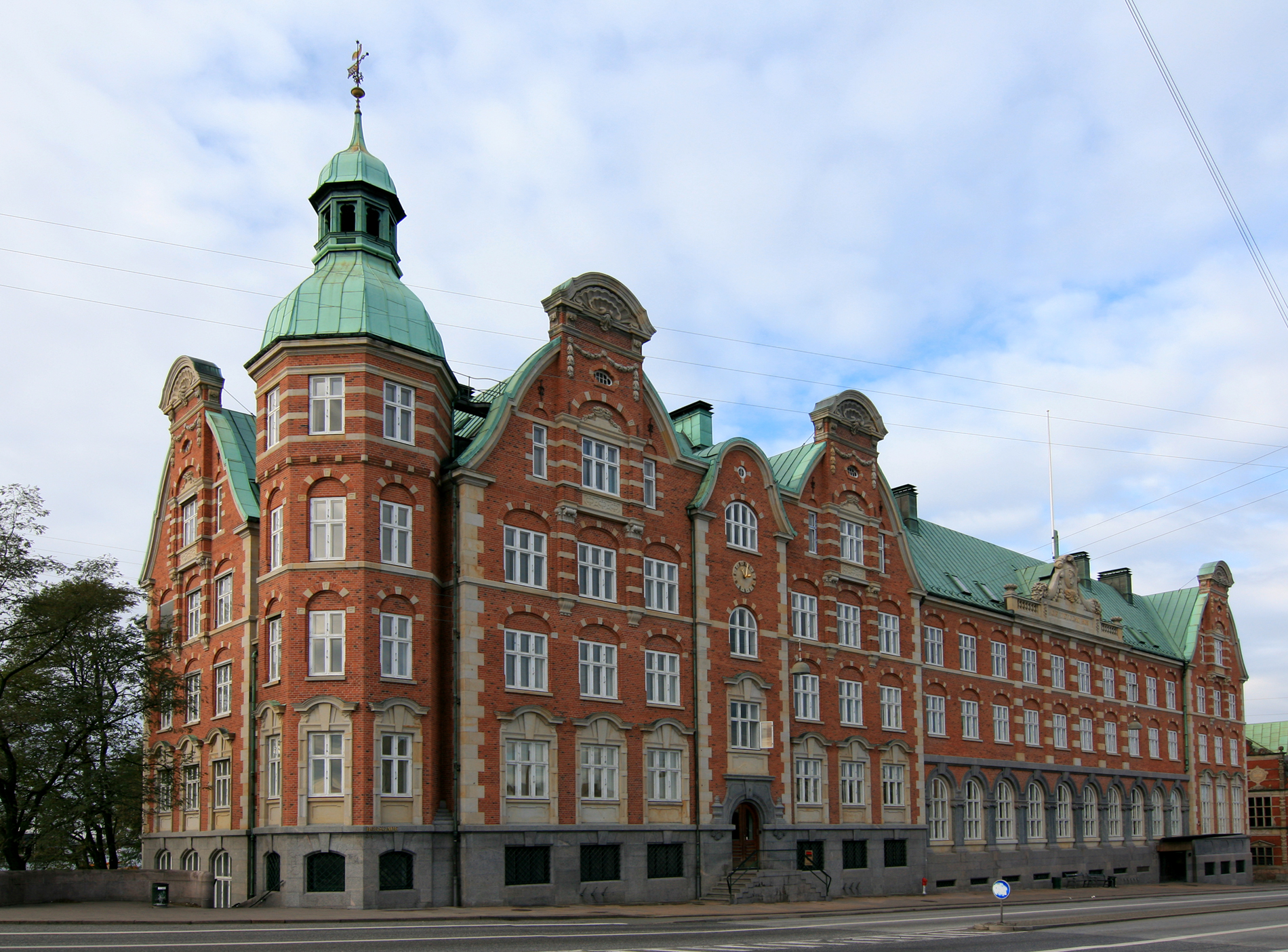
Former Privatbanken headquarters
