= Cube Gallery =

Former architecture museum in Manchester, England

Coordinates: 53°28′36.45″N 2°14′27.10″W

CUBE
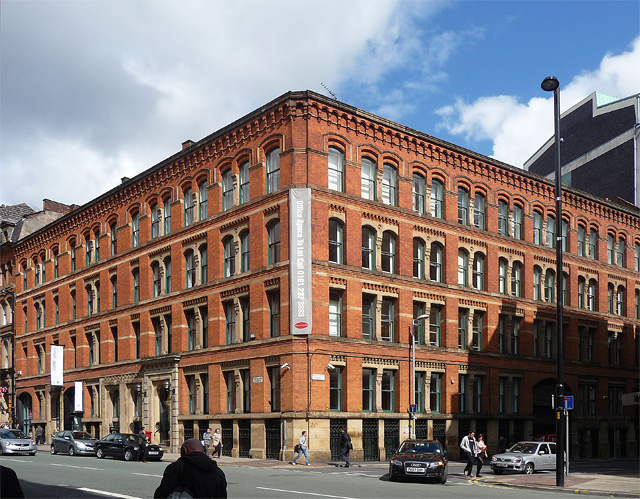
- Dissolved: 2013
- Location: 113–115 Portland Street, Manchester, England
- Website: http://www.cube.org.uk/

The CUBE (Centre for the Urban Built Environment) Gallery on Portland Street, in Manchester city centre, England, was a gallery for architecture and the built environment. It hosted regular exhibitions featuring mostly photography and architectural models (but also multimedia). It also contained a RIBA bookshop selling books on architecture, the built environment, planning, and other forms of design.

CUBE was supported through the University of Salford's School of the Built Environment but closed in October 2013 as funding was withdrawn.
