= Kamal Meattle =

Indian environmental activist

- Known for: TED 2009 entitled How to Grow Your Own Fresh Air

Kamal Meattle is an Indian environmental activist and CEO of Paharpur Business Centre & Software Technology Incubator Park based in New Delhi, India. Meattle held a talk at TED 2009 entitled How to Grow Your Own Fresh Air.

== Attributions ==
After becoming allergic to New Delhi's polluted air in 1992, Meattle claimed to have discovered that three common houseplants could help reduce the pollutants in the air. The three plants and their properties are listed below:

=== Areca palm (Chrysalidocarpus lutescens) ===
- Works well in the day time
- Great for living areas
- One needs about 4 shoulder-high plants/person
- Needs to be put outdoors once every 3–4 months
- The leaves of the plant need to be wiped every day in Delhi and perhaps once a week in a cleaner city
- The soil used should be of vermi manure or use hydroponics

=== Mother-in-law's tongue (Sansevieria trifasciata) ===
- Converts CO_{2} into O_{2} at night
- One requires about 6–8 such waist-high plants per person in the bedroom
- Leaves need to be wiped in the same way as the Areca Palm
- The soil used should be of vermi manure or use hydroponics

=== Money plant (Epipremnum aureum) ===
- Excellent for removing formaldehyde and other volatile organic compounds
- Best grown using hydroponics

Meattle does not provide any numerical data to support his claims, nor is there third-party confirmation of the results, but at least one study calls the hypothesis into question.

== See also ==
- NASA Clean Air Study, where all three plants are listed
