= Hans Anker Jørgensen =

Danish priest and hymn writer (born 1945)

Hans Anker Jørgensen (born 26 January 1945, Copenhagen) is a Danish priest and hymn writer.

== Life ==
He has been a parish priest at various churches in Copenhagen as well as from 1991 a chaplain to Copenhagen University. He retired in 2005. Six of his hymns appear in Den Danske Salmebog hymnbook:

- 68: Se, hvilket menneske
- 197: "Min Gud, min Gud, hvorfor har du forladt mig!"
- 249: Hvad er det at møde den opstandne mester
- 260: Du satte dig selv i de nederstes sted
- 369: Du, som gir os liv og gør os glade
- 658: Når jeg er træt og trist, når modet svigter

In the Norwegian hymnbook, as well as in Swedish complemtents to the hymnbook, he is also represented by his hymn about baptism:

Sov du lille, sov nu godt (NoS13 nr 589; Psalmer i 90-talet nr 832; Psalmer i 2000-talet nr 928).
