= Philip Arctander =

Danish architect (1916–1994)

Philip Arctander (14 June 1916 – 27 January 1994) was a Danish architect. He exhibited at the Charlottenborg Spring Exhibition in 1942. Later, he served as director of the Danish Building Research Institute.

== See also ==
- List of Danish architects
