= Danish Architecture Centre =

Architecture museum in Copenhagen, DK

Coordinates: 55.672278°N 12.5785°E

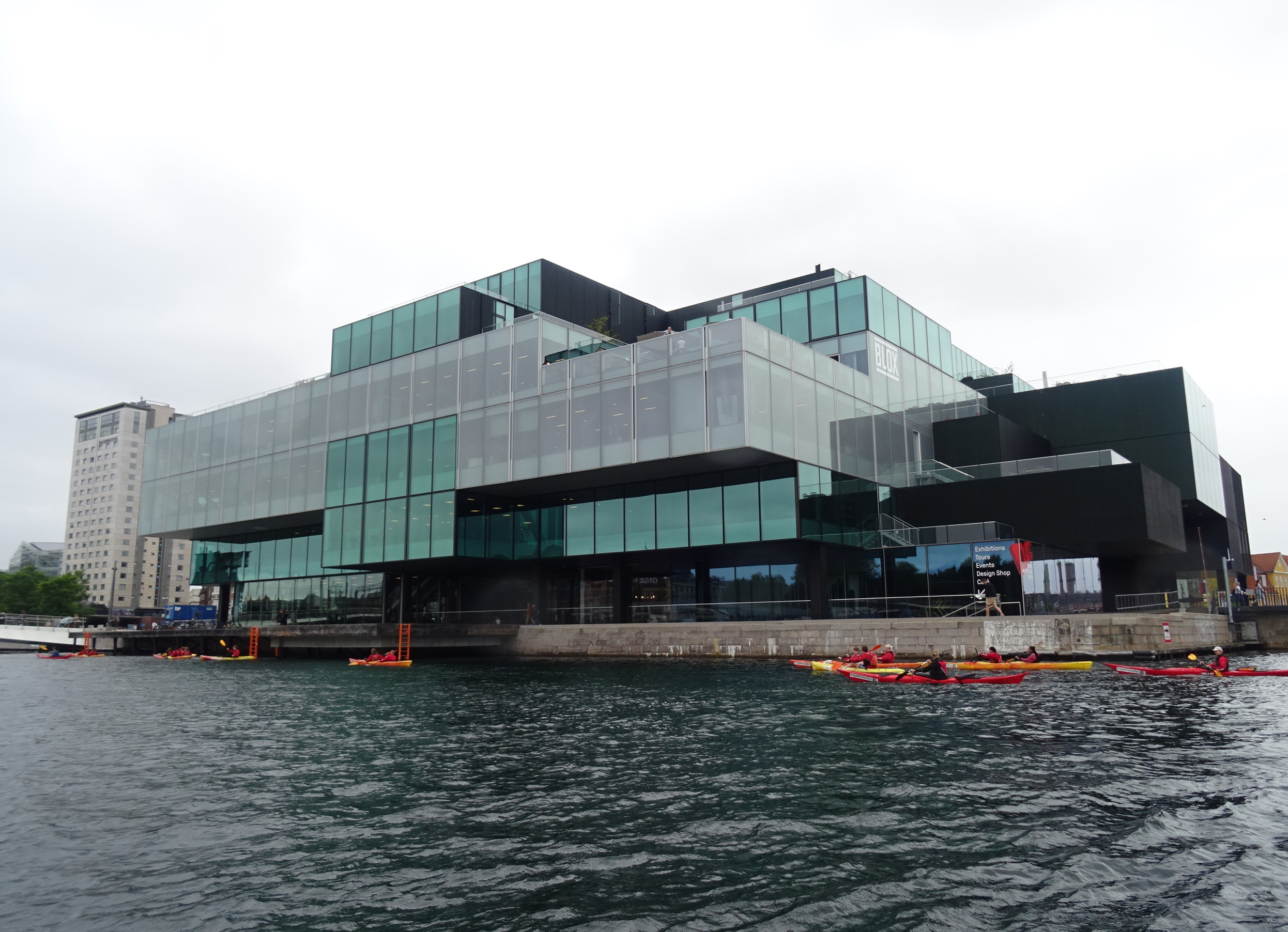
Danish Architecture Center in BLOX

Danish Architecture Center (Danish: Dansk Arkitektur Center, DAC) is Denmark's national center for the development and dissemination of knowledge about architecture, building and urban development. DAC is located in the BLOX building in Copenhagen.

DAC's objective and legitimacy consist in promoting co-operation across the professional boundaries of the construction sector and architecture so that the players, working together, are able to contribute to the forward-looking development of architecture and construction specifically and Danish society in general.

DAC's core funding is provided by a public-private partnership between Realdania and the Danish government. The government is represented by: the Ministry of Business of Denmark and the Ministry of Culture of Denmark.

== History ==
DAC was founded in 1985 through a collaboration between the Danish Ministry of Culture, the Ministry of Economic and Business Affairs and the Realdania foundation.

== See also ==
- Architecture of Denmark
