= Musicon =

This is an article about a district in Zealand

Coordinates: 55°37′33″N 12°05′3″E

Musicon is a district of the city of Roskilde on the Danish island of Zealand. It is being developed south of Roskilde railway station in an area of 250,000 m^{2} (2,700,000 sq ft) where a cement factory once stood.

Roskilde Municipality is developing a new district centred on creative cultural associations and institutions. Although planning extends over 15 years, there are already many activities and events in the area. As of December 2014, 29 enterprises have based their offices in the Musicon district, providing around 1,100 jobs. About 200 young people have moved into the area's housing accommodation. Denmark's Rockmuseum is scheduled to open at the end of 2015.

In 2012, Roskilde Municipality won the Danish Urban Planning Award (Byplanprisen) for their development strategy for Musicon, including its Rabalder Park.
