= Lene Tranberg =

Danish architect

Lene Tranberg (born 29 November 1956) is a Danish architect, head architect and a founding partner of Lundgaard & Tranberg.

== Biography ==
Lene Tranberg was born in Copenhagen in 1956. In 1977, she was admitted to the Royal Danish Academy of Fine Arts, School of Architecture where she studied under Erik Christian Sørensen. Lene Tranberg seeks for a "sensory and site-specific approach" to architecture while "flowing transitions between building and nature that activate new identities and relationships within urban context." The main principles of her work focus on craftsmanship, humanism, and simplification. Keeping these values in mind, she bases her designs in Nordic architecture. Tranberg integrates sustainability into her designs by considering materiality and the building's lifespan. In 1983, one year before graduating, she co-founded Lundgaard & Tranberg with Boje Lundgaard. The firm gained prominence after the turn of the millennium with a number of high-profile buildings in Copenhagen, including most notably the Tietgenkollegiet student residences and the Royal Danish Playhouse. Both are generally considered to be among the most successful Danish buildings of the decade. Tranberg and Lundgaard worked together to cultivate the firm until 2004, and today it is run with six other partners.

In parallel with her career as a practicing architect, Tranberg began teaching at the Academy in 1986 and was employed there as a lector from 1989 to 1998. She has also held numerous positions in the world of Danish architecture, including CEO of the Danish Architecture Centre from 1998 to 2002.

== Awards and distinctions ==
=== Individual distinctions ===
- 1994 Eckersberg Medal (with Boje Lundgaard)
- 2002 Dreyer Honorary Award (with Boje Lundgaard)
- 2005 Nykredit Architecture Prize
- 2005 C. F. Hansen Medal
- 2010 Danish Business Woman of the Year
- 2008 Honor Prize, National Bank of Denmark Jubilee Fund
- 2010 Knight of the Order of the Dannebrog
- 2010 Honorary Fellowship, American Institute of Architects
- 2014 Prince Eugen Medal for architecture

=== Distinctions for projects ===
- 2006 RIBA European Award for Kilen
- 2007 RIBA European Award for Tietgenkollegiet
- 2008 RIBA European Award for Royal Danish Playhouse
- 2008 iF product design award for Royal Playhouse theatre chair
- 2009 Red Dot Design Award for Royal Playhouse theatre chair

== See also ==
- Women in architecture
- Tranberg, Lene. “Tietgen Dormitory / Lundgaard &amp; Tranberg Architects.” ArchDaily. ArchDaily, February 7, 2014. https://www.archdaily.com/474237/tietgen-dormitory-lundgaard-and-tranberg-architects.
- Tranberg, Lene, and Justine Harvey. 2016. “Give Something Away for Free: In Denmark, Lundgaard & Tranberg Arkitekter Is Continuing the Country’s Tradition for Design That Works to Knit Society Together as the Starting Point for Its Architecture.” Architecture New Zealand Dec. (November): 28–32. https://search-ebscohost-com.spot.lib.auburn.edu/login.aspx?direct=true&db=bvh&AN=759537&site=ehost-live.
