= Kim Herforth Nielsen =

Danish architect (born 1954)

Kim Herforth Nielsen (born 1954) is a Danish architect, co-founder and principal of 3XN. He graduated from Aarhus School of Architecture in 1981 and has been a prominent figure in Danish and international architecture since then. Kim Herforth Nielsen has been at the forefront of a number of noteworthy projects, such as Ørestad College and Royal Arena in Copenhagen, the Danish Embassy in Berlin, International Olympic Committee's HQ in Lausanne and Sydney Fish Market.

== Biography ==
Nielsen graduated from the Aarhus School of Architecture in 1981 and was one of the three Nielsen-founders in 1986. Ever since he has been the driving force behind 3XN, and been involved in all the practice's major projects, including The Blue Planet, Kubus in Berlin, Museum of Liverpool, Ørestad College, Muziekgebouw Concert Hall in Amsterdam, the Danish Embassy in Berlin and the Architects’ House in Copenhagen. He is often called upon as a jury member in international architectural competitions, and as lecturer at art academies and universities around the world. He is a Knight of Dannebrog and has received Denmark's highest architectural honor, the C.F. Hansen Medaille.,

== Background ==
In 1986, Kim Herforth Nielsen was involved in establishing the firm, 3xNielsen. Since then, the company has not only changed its name to 3XN, but also achieved resounding success and recognition for projects in many parts of the world. Today, Kim Herforth Nielsen is director and creative leader of 3XN, which is one of Denmark's largest architect firms.

== Major Projects ==
Kim Herforth Nielsen is the architect behind many of Copenhagen's most distinctive buildings. Royal Arena, Den Blå Planet – Denmark's National Aquarium, UN City, and Ørestad Gymnasium are just some of the many buildings designed by his hand and are admired by countless eyes every day. He is also known for his numerous residential, corporate- and hotel buildings, including Saxo Bank, Bella Sky Hotel, Middelfart Savings Bank, Horten HQ in Hellerup, Lighthouse in Aarhus, Frederiksberg Courthouse and La Tour in Aarhus.

Outside of Denmark, Kim Herforth Nielsen has designed Sydney Fish Market and Quay Quarter in Sydney, Aqualuna and Aquabella in Toronto, IOC Headquarters in Lausanne, Segerstedthuset, Swedbank and Stockholm Continental in Sweden, The Cube in Berlin, Cultural Centre Buen and Cultural Centre Plassen in Norway, Museum of Liverpool, Muziekgebouw in Amsterdam, the Danish Embassy in Berlin, Duale Hochschule in Stuttgart, Renngasse no. 10 in Vienna and Mumbai Towers in India.

== Affiliations ==
From 2008-2013, Kim Herforth Nielsen was a jury member at the World Architecture Festival. He is a member of the Royal Danish Academy of Fine Arts, the PAR's Prize Committee and a judge with the Danish Architectural Association.

He lectures and teaches at art academies and universities all over the world, and since 2013 he has been chairman of the Danish Arts Foundation Architecture Committee.

== Project Experience ==
- Frederiksberg Courthouse, Copenhagen, DK (2009)
- Bridge over Copenhagen Inner Harbour, pedestrian bridges, Copenhagen, DK (2009)
- Dublin Concert Hall, Dublin, IE (2009)
- Daimler, head office, Stuttgart-Untertürkheim, DE (2009)
- Horten, head office, Tuborg Harbour, DK (2006–2009)
- CPH Arch, 2 towers and a bridge, Copenhagen, DK (2008)
- KPMG, head office, Copenhagen, DK (2008–2011)
- Marmormolen, masterplan, Copenhagen, DK, 1. prize (2008)
- The Blue Planet, new Denmark's Aquarium, Copenhagen, DK, 1. prize (2008–2013)
- Z-Raderna, dwellings, Stockholm, SE, 1. prize (2008-)
- Kubus, Berlin, DE, 1. prize (2007-)
- Theatre and Jazzhouse in Molde, NO, 1. prize. (2007–2011)
- Lighthouse, mixed use, Aarhus, DK, 1. prize (2006-)
- Rainbow, mixed use, Dublin, IE, 2. prize (2006-)
- Bella Hotel, Copenhagen, DK, 1. prize (2006–2011)
- Horsens Stadium, DK, 1. prize (2006–2009)
- Middelfart Savings Bank, DK, 1. prize (2006–2010)
- Stadshuis Nieuwegein, NL (2006–2011)
- Arts and Media Centre, University of Salford, Salford, UK, 1. prize (2005-)
- Museum of Liverpool, UK, 1. prize (2005–2010)
- Saxo Bank, head office, Tuborg Havn, DK, 1. prize (2005–2008)
- Muziekgebouw, Amsterdam, NL (2005)
- Deloitte Building, Copenhagen, DK (2001–2005)
- Technical School in Tangen, Kristiansand, NO, 1. prize (2004–2009)
- Ørestad College, Copenhagen, DK, 1. prize (2003–2007)
- Alsion, university, science park and concert hall, Sønderborg, DK, 1. prize (2002–2007)
- DFDS Terminal, Copenhagen, DK (2003–2004)
- Danish Embassy in Berlin, DE (1999)
- Architect's House, Copenhagen, DK (1996)

== Honorary Office and Distinctions ==
=== Awards ===
- Knight of Dannebrog, 2000
- Eckersberg Medal, 1999
- 2010 C. F. Hansen Medal
- Awards: RIBA (2005, 2007, 2009), Mipim (2004, 2006)

=== Other ===
- Jury member, World Architecture Festival 2008, 2009
- Jury member, Architectural Review's Awards for Emerging Architecture 2006
- Jury member, The Architects’ Association of Denmark
- External examiner at the Royal Danish Academy of Art
- Member of PAR's Prize Committee
- Member of the Royal Danish Academy of Fine Arts

== Memberships ==
- Member of Danske ARK (Danish Architects' Assoc.)
- Membership no 6427- 280354
- Chartered member of RIBA, UK. Membership number 10953725
- Member of UN Global Compact
