= RIBA European Award =

British architectural award

RIBA European Awards are part of an award program by the Royal Institute of British Architects. Complemented by the RIBA National and International Awards, it rewards "the excellent work being done by RIBA members in the European Union outside the UK". Awarded annually, it is given to a varying number of buildings. They are judged by the RIBA Awards Group, and winners are eligible for the Stirling Prize.

== Laureates ==
=== 2014 ===
RIBA European award winners in 2014 were:

Building	Location	Architect	Nationality
Library and Learning Centre	Vienna; Austria	Zaha Hadid Architects	United Kingdom
Musiktheater Linz	Linz; Austria	Terry Pawson	United Kingdom
Blue Planet Aquarium	Copenhagen; Denmark	3XN	Denmark
Danish Maritime Museum	Helsingør; Denmark	Bjarke Ingels Group	Denmark
Vartorv Square	Copenhagen; Denmark	Hall McKnight	Ireland
Marseille Vieux Port	Marseille; France	Foster and Partners	United Kingdom
Enzo Ferrari Museum	Modena; Italy	Shiro Studio	United Kingdom
Baakenhafen Bridge	Hamburg; Germany	Wilkinson Eyre Architects	Ireland
Extension Joachimstrasse 11	Berlin; Germany	David Chipperfield Architects	United Kingdom
Lenbachhaus extension	Munich; Germany	Foster and Partners	United Kingdom
New civic centre	Florence; Italy	Rogers Stirk Harbour and Partners	United Kingdom
Kraaiennest metro station	Amsterdam; Netherlands	Maccreanor Lavington	Netherlands

=== 2013 ===
RIBA European award winners in 2013 were:

Building	Location	Architect	Nationality
Frederiksberg Courthouse	Copenhagen; Denmark	3XN	Denmark
Sorø Art Museum	Sorø; Denmark	Lundgaard & Tranberg	Denmark
Pierresvives	Montpellier; France	Zaha Hadid Architects	United Kingdom
MBA Building, Ecole des Hautes Etudes Commerciales	Paris; France	David Chipperfield Architects	United Kingdom
House on Mount Anville	Dublin; Ireland	Aughey O'Flaherty Architects	Ireland
University of Limerick Medical School and Pergola Bus Shelter	Limerick; Ireland	Grafton Architects	Ireland
Enzo Ferrari Museum	Modena; Italy	Shiro Studio	United Kingdom
Hoflaan House	Rotterdam; Netherlands	Maccreanor Lavington	Netherlands
Municipal Auditorium of Teulada	Alicante; Spain	Francisco Mangado y Asociados	Spain

=== 2012 ===
RIBA European award winners in 2012 were:

Building	Location	Architect	Nationality
Bilbao Arena	Bilbao; Spain	IDOM	United Kingdom
Centre Pompidou-Metz	Metz; France	Shigeru Ban	Japan
FCN 2009	Sicily; Italy	Maria Giuseppina Grasso Cannizzo	Italy
H27D	Konstanz; Germany	Kraus Schoenberg	Germany
Las Arenas	Barcelona; Spain	Rogers Stirk Harbour	United Kingdom
Maison L	near Paris; France	Christian Pottgiesser	France
PJ Carroll Factory	Wexford; Ireland	Scott Tallon Walker	Ireland
Solid 11	Amsterdam; Netherlands	Tony Fretton	United Kingdom
Wexford County Council Headquarters	Wexford; Ireland	Robin Lee	United Kingdom

=== 2011 ===
RIBA European award winners in 2011 were:

Building	Location	Architect	Nationality
Aviva Stadium	Dublin; Ireland	Scott Tallon Walker	Ireland
Bodegas Portia	Ribera del Duero; Spain	Foster and Partners	United Kingdom
De Prinsendam	Amsterdam; Netherlands	Tony Fretton	United Kingdom
Harbour Isle Apartments	Copenhagen; Denmark	Lundgaard & Tranberg	Denmark
Kaufhaus Tyrol	Innsbruck; Austria	David Chipperfield	United Kingdom
Middelfart Savings Bank	Middelfart; Denmark	3XN	Denmark
Museum Folkwang	Essen; Germany	David Chipperfield	United Kingdom
SEB Bank	Copenhagen; Denmark	Lundgaard & Tranberg	Denmark

=== 2010 ===
RIBA European award winners in 2010 were:

Building	Location	Architect	Nationality
A. P. Møller School	Schleswig; Germany	C. F. Møller Architects	Denmark
Neues Museum	Berlin; Germany	David Chipperfield Architects, Restoration Architect Julian Harrap Architects	United Kingdom
House at Spanish Cove	Cork; Ireland	Niall McLaughlin Architects	United Kingdom
VISUAL – Centre for Contemporary art & George Bernard Shaw Theatre	Carlow; Ireland	Terry Pawson Architects	United Kingdom
Alzheimers respite centre	Dublin; Ireland	Niall McLaughlin Architects	United Kingdom
MAXXI – National Museum of the 21st Century Arts	Rome; Italy	Zaha Hadid Architects	United Kingdom
British Embassy Warsaw	Warsaw; Poland	Tony Fretton Architects	United Kingdom
Campus Palmas Altas	Seville; Spain	Rogers Stirk Harbour + Partners	United Kingdom
Ciutat de la Justícia de Barcelona i l'Hospitalet de Llobregat	Barcelona; Spain	David Chipperfield Architects	United Kingdom

=== 2009 ===
Building	Location	Architect	Nationality
Fuglsang Art Museum	Lolland; Denmark	Tony Fretton	United Kingdom
Zenith	Saint-Étienne; France	Foster + Partners	United Kingdom
Burren House	Dublin; Ireland	Niall McLaughlin Architects	United Kingdom
Wexford Opera House	Wexford; Ireland	Keith Williams Architects	United Kingdom
Hoogvliet Heerlijkhied	Rotterdam; Netherlands	FAT	United Kingdom
Bodegas Protos	Ribera del Duero; Spain	Rogers Stirk Harbour + Partners	United Kingdom

=== 2008 ===
RIBA European award winners in 2008 were:

Building	Location	Architect	Nationality
Am Kupfergraben	Berlin; Germany	David Chipperfield Architects	United Kingdom
Bijlmer Station	Amsterdam; Netherlands	Grimshaw/Arcadis	United Kingdom
BMW Welt	Munich; Germany	Coop Himmelb(l)au	Austria
Carabanchel Social Housing	Madrid; Spain	Foreign Office Architects	United Kingdom
Empire Riverside Hotel	Hamburg; Germany	David Chipperfield Architects	United Kingdom
The Living Bridge	Limerick; Ireland	Wilkinson Eyre Architects	United Kingdom
Lufthansa Aviation Centre	Frankfurt; Germany	David Chipperfield Architects	United Kingdom
Nordpark Cable Railway	Innsbruck; Austria	Zaha Hadid	United Kingdom
Royal Playhouse	Copenhagen; Denmark	Lundgaard & Tranberg	Denmark
The Sleeping Giant	Ireland	O'Donnell Tuomey Architects	Ireland

=== 2007 ===
RIBA European award winners in 2007 were:

Building	Location	Architect	Nationality
Villa in the Var	Bargemon; France	Dixon Jones / Jean-Paul Radigois	United Kingdom/France
Tietgenkollegiet	Ørestad, Copenhagen; Denmark	Lundgaard & Tranberg	Denmark
Cherry Orchard Primary School	Dublin; Ireland	O'Donnell & Tuomey	Ireland
Environmental Research Institute	Cork; Ireland	Bucholz McEvoy Architects	Ireland
Alsion	Sønderborg; Denmark	3XN Architects	Denmark
Casa da Musica	Porto; Portugal	OMA	Netherlands
Cork Institute of Technology	Cork; Ireland	De Blacam & Meagher Boyd Barrett Murphy-O’Connor Architects	Ireland
Sint Lucas Art Academy	Boxtel; Netherlands	Fashion Architecture Taste	United Kingdom
Cork City Council Civic Offices	Cork; Ireland	ABK Architects	United Kingdom
Museum of Modern Literature	Marbach; Germany	David Chipperfield Architects	United Kingdom
America's Cup Building	Valencia; Spain	David Chipperfield Architects	United Kingdom
Law Courts	Antwerp; Belgium	Rogers, Stirk, Harbour + Partners	United Kingdom
Dresden Station Redevelopment	Dresden; Germany	Foster + Partners	United Kingdom

=== 2006 ===
RIBA European award winners in 2006 were:

Building	Location	Architect	Nationality
Aras Chill Dara	Naas; Ireland	Heneghan Peng	United Kingdom
Caixa Galicia Art Gallery	A Coruña; Spain	Grimshaw/Arcadis	United Kingdom
Federal Environmental Agency	Dessau; Germany	Sauerbruch Hutton	Germany
Kilen	Copenhagen; Denmark	Lundgaard & Tranberg	Denmark
New Area Terminal, Barajas Airport	Madrid; Spain	Rogers Stirk Harbour + Partners	United Kingdom
Phaeno Science Center	Wolfsburg; Germany	Zaha Hadid	United Kingdom
Poustinia	Kilsheelan; Ireland	Architects Bates Maher	Ireland
Frieder Burda Collection Museum	Baden; Germany	Richard Meier	United States

=== 2005 ===
RIBA European award winners in 2005 were:

Building	Location	Architect	Nationality
Sampension Headquarters	Copenhagen; Denmark	3XN Architects	Denmark
Millau Viaduct	Millau; France	Foster + Partners	United Kingdom
BMW Central Building	Leipzig; Germany	Zaha Hadid	United Kingdom
Entory Home	Ettlingen; Germany	Behnisch, Behnisch + Partner	Germany
Fire & Police Station	Berlin; Germany	Sauerbruch Hutton	Germany
Athlone Civic Centre	Athlone; Ireland	Keith Williams Architects	United Kingdom
Connolly Hospital	Blanchardstown; Ireland	A&D Weichent Architects	Ireland
SAP Galway	Parkmore East; Ireland	Bucholz McEvoy Architects	Ireland
Sheltered Housing & Hostel	Gorey; Ireland	Paul Keogh Architects	Ireland
Wheatfield Courtyard	County Dublin; Ireland	David McDowell	Ireland
Max Mara Headquarters	Reggio Emilia; Italy	John McAslan + Partners	United Kingdom
South-East Coastal Path	Barcelona; Spain	Foreign Office Architects	United Kingdom
Museum of World Culture	Gothenburg; Sweden	Brisac Gonzalez Architects	United Kingdom
Café Mangiarebere Wine Bar	Catania; Italy	Studio Maria Giuseppina/Grasso Cannizzo	Italy

== See also ==
- List of architecture prizes
- RIBA Award
