= Lundgaard & Tranberg =

Danish architectural firm

Lundgaard & Tranberg Arkitekter

Practice information
- Key architects: Lene Tranberg Boje Lundgaard
- Founded: 1985
- Location: Copenhagen

Significant works and honors
- Buildings: Royal Danish Playhouse; Tietgenkollegiet; Sorø Art Museum; Kannikegården
- Awards: 6 RIBA European Awards

Website
- ltarkitekter.dk

Lundgaard & Tranberg Arkitekter is a Danish architectural firm, based in Copenhagen, Denmark.

== History ==
Lundgaard & Tranberg was founded in 1985 by Boje Lundgaard and Lene Tranberg. In the 1990s, the firm gained a reputation as designers of heat & power plant and other technical facilities, while its breakthrough in the general public came in the mid-2000s with the Charlottehaven residential project from 2004 and particularly the award-winning and highly celebrated designs for the Tietgenkollegiet student residences and a new building for the Royal Danish Theater. In 2004, just when the firm's major success set in, Boje Lundgaard departed, and Lene Tranberg continued the practice with a new partner group.

== Selected projects ==
- Trapholt Museum, Kolding (Phase1: Boje Lundgaard & Bente Aude (1988). Phase 2: Lundgaard & Tranberg Architects (1996))
- Charlottehaven, Copenhagen (2004)
- Tietgenkollegiet, Copenhagen (2006)
- Kilen, Copenhagen Business School, Copenhagen (2007)
- Royal Danish Playhouse, Copenhagen (2008)
- Havneholmen, Copenhagen (2009)
- SEB Bank & Pension, Copenhagen (2010)
- Sorø Art Museum, Sorø (2011)
- Pier47, Copenhagen (2015)
- Kannikegården, Ribe (2016)
- Ofelia Square, Copenhagen (2016)
- Axel Towers, Copenhagen (2017)
- The Museum of Danish Resistance, Copenhagen (2020)

== Selected awards ==
- 2006 RIBA European Award for Kilen
- 2007 RIBA European Award for Tietgenkollegiet
- 2008 RIBA European Award for Royal Danish Playhouse
- 2011 RIBA European Award for Havneholmen Apartments
- 2011 RIBA European Award for SEB Bank
- 2013 RIBA EU Award for Sorø Art Museum

== Gallery ==
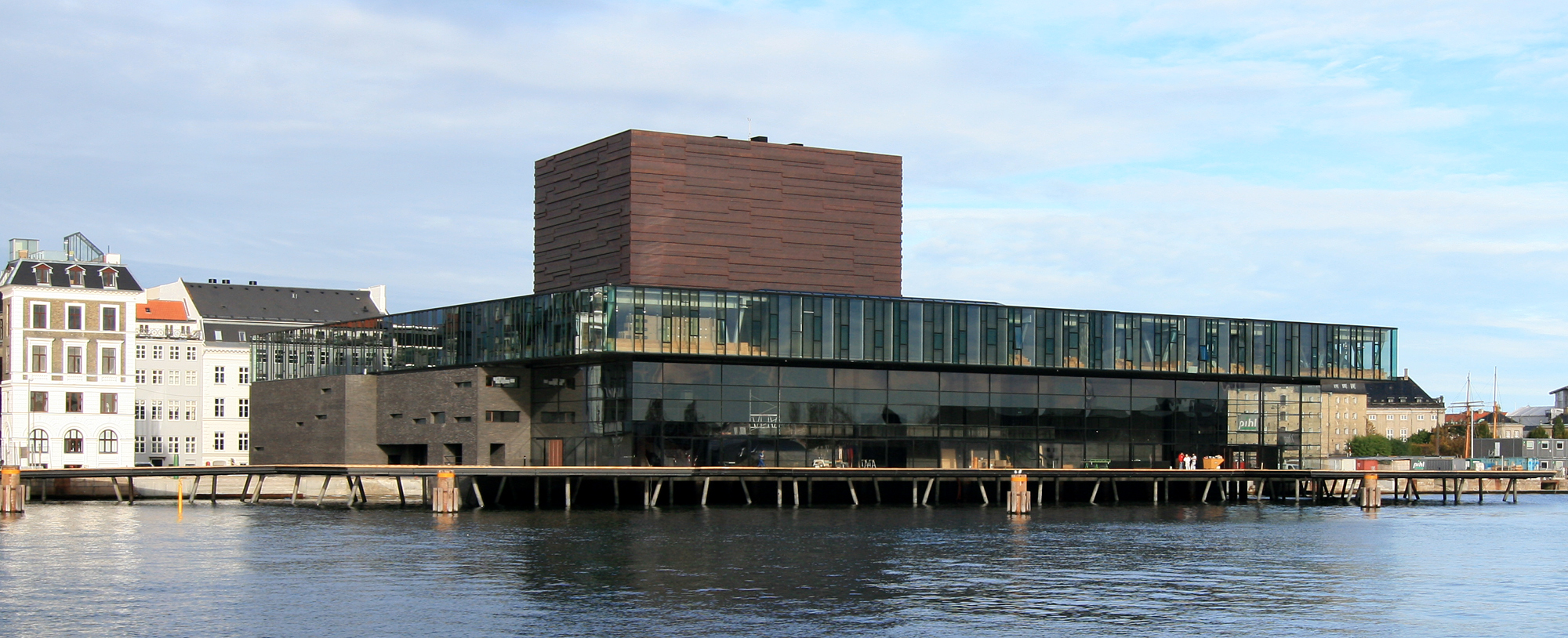
Royal Danish Playhouse

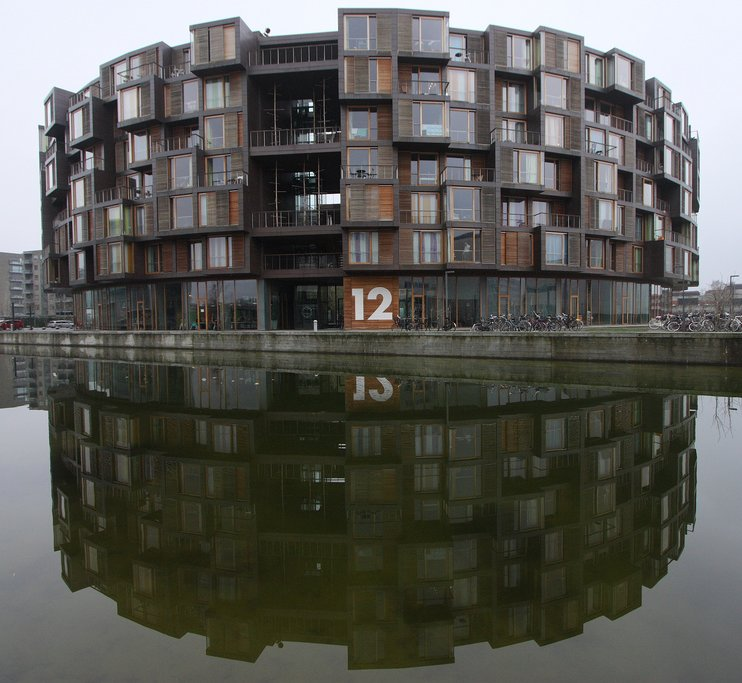
Tietgen Domitory

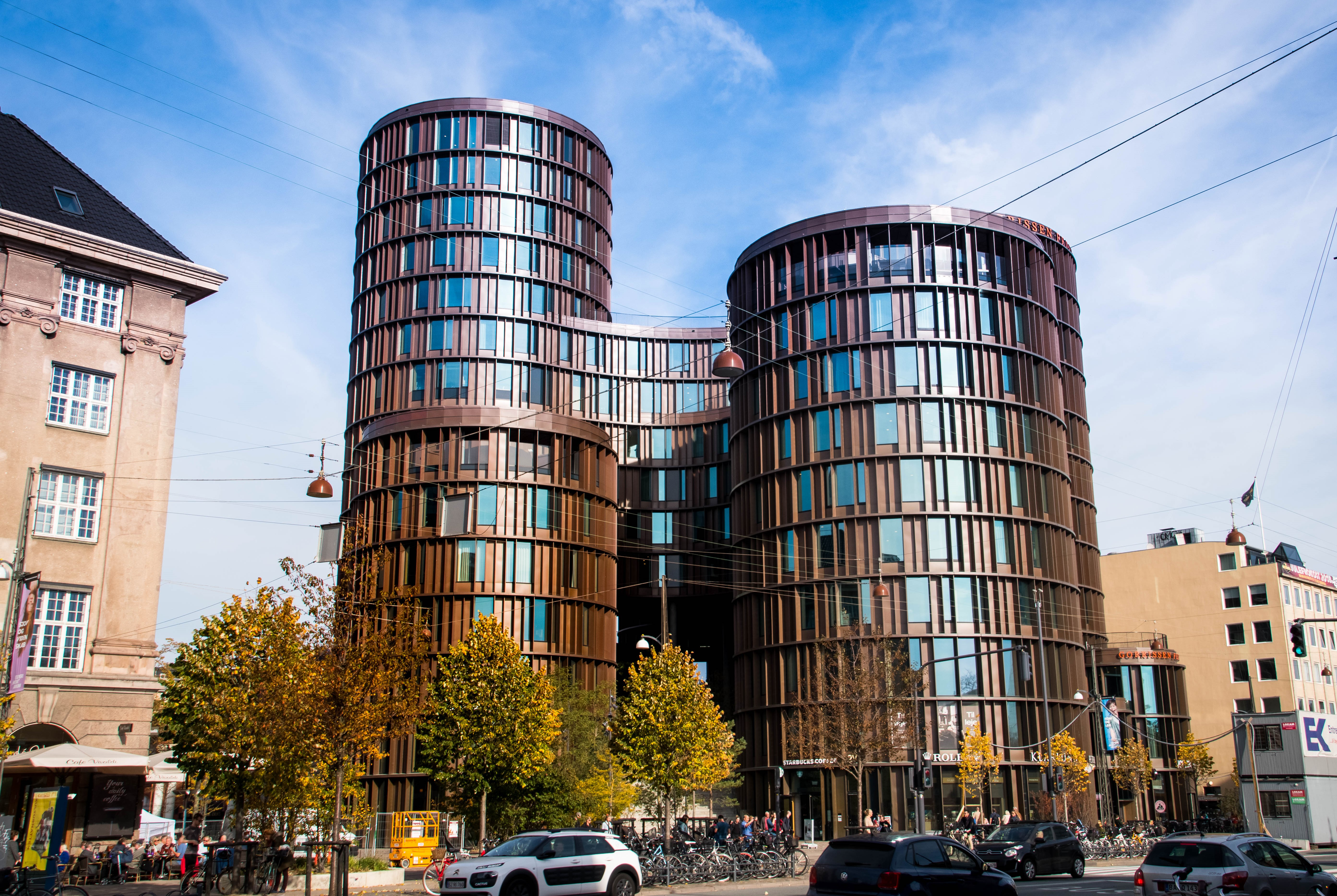
Axel Towers

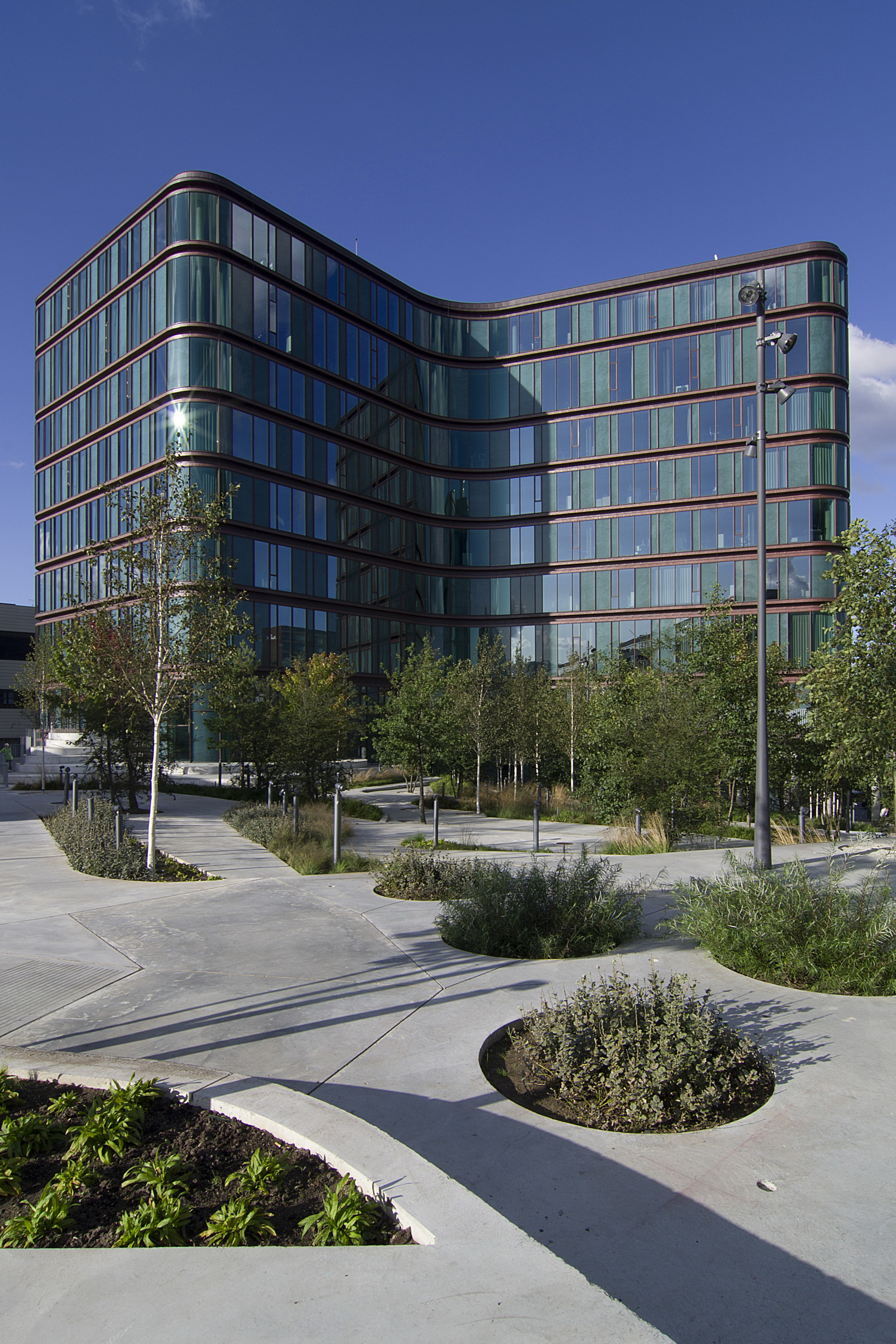
SEB Bank & Pension

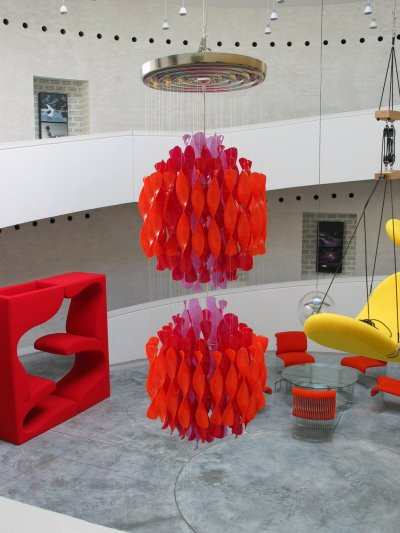
Trapholt Art Museum

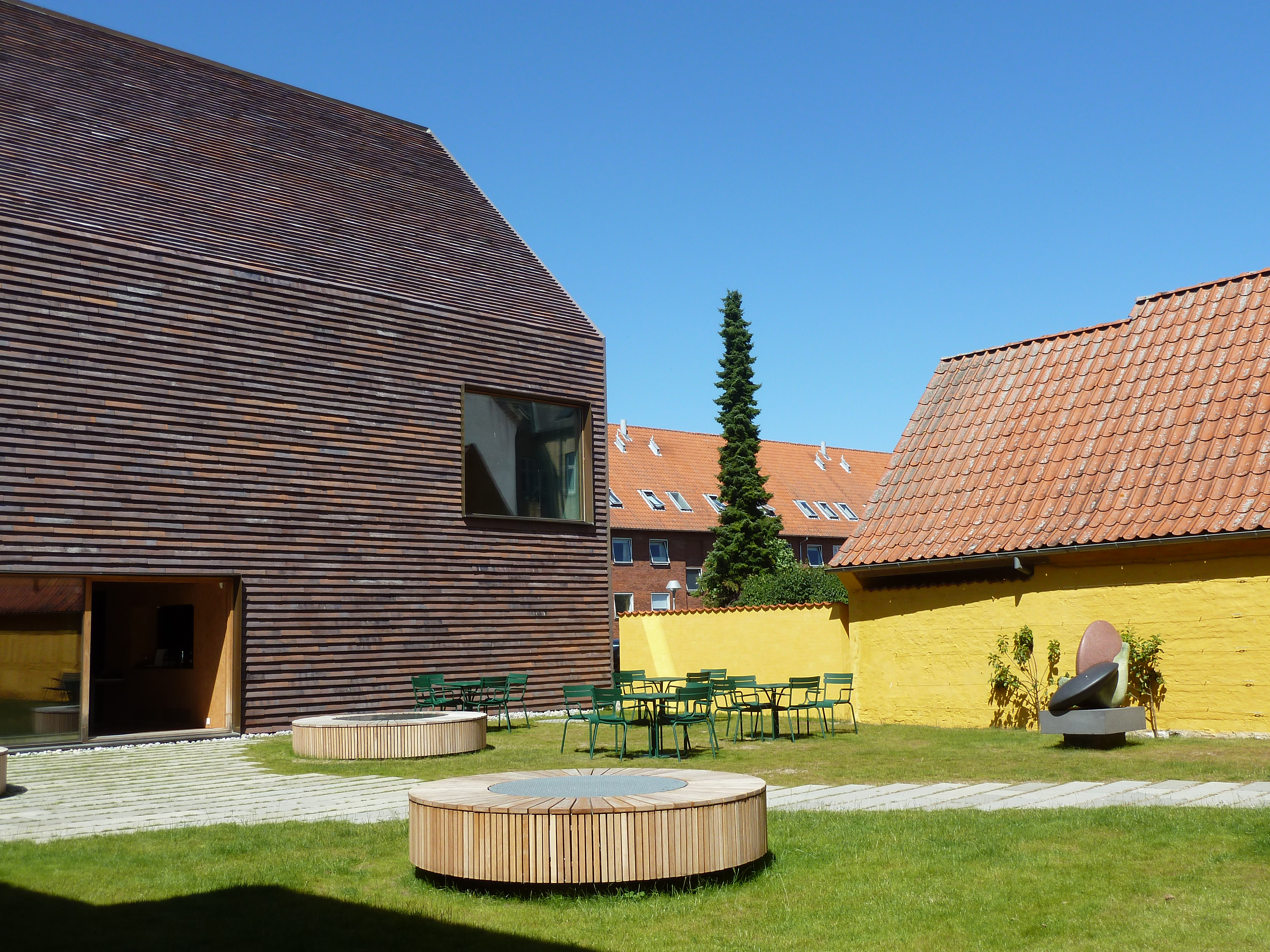
Sorø Art Museum

== See also ==
- Architecture of Denmark
- List of Danish architectural firms
