= Sorø Art Museum =

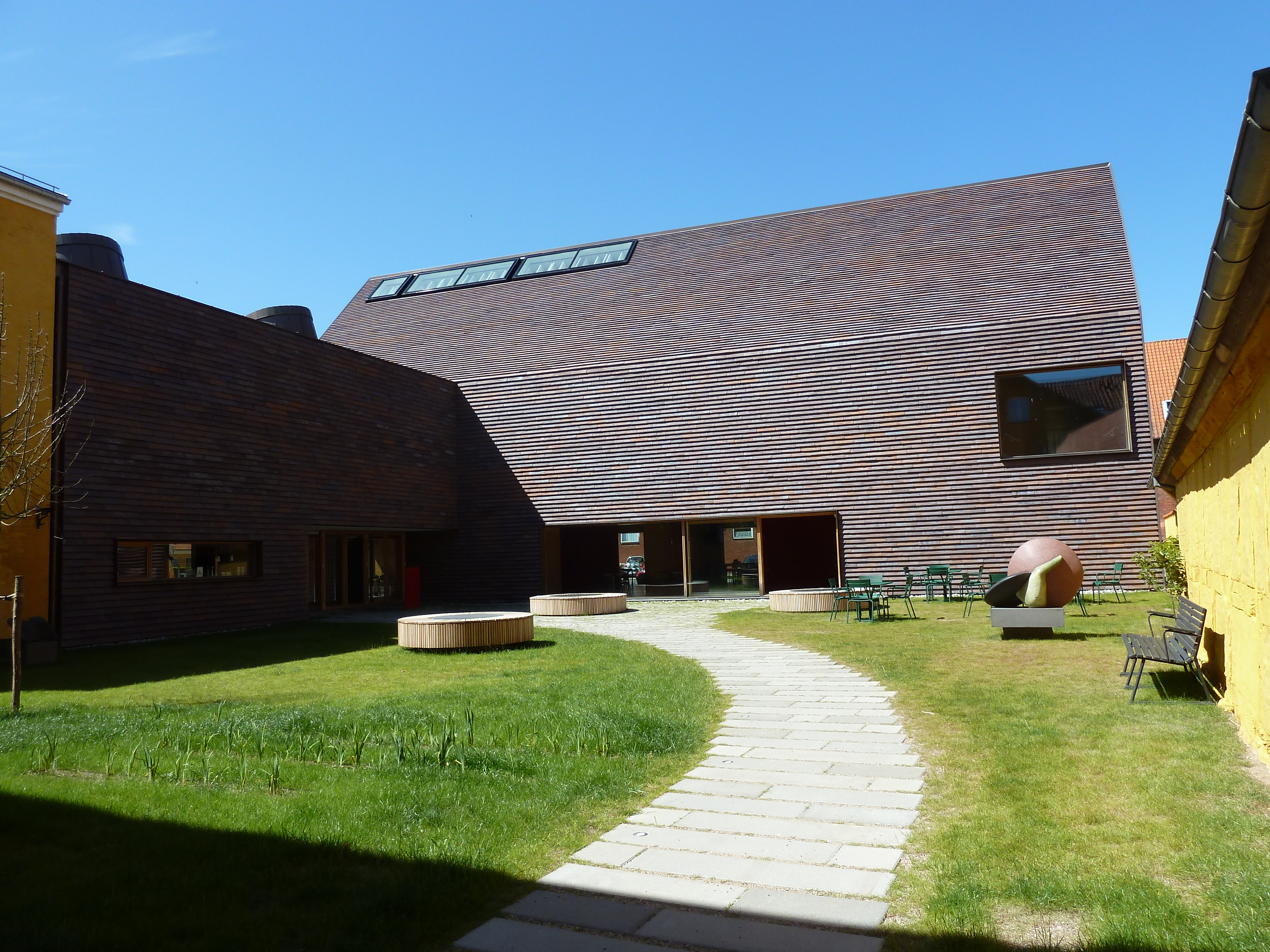
- Established: 1932
- Location: Sorø, Denmark
- Coordinates: 55.4327°N 11.5558°E
- Type: Art museum
- Director: Charlotte Sabroe
- Website: sorokunstmuseum.dk

Sorø Art Museum is an art museum located in Sorø, Denmark. It displays a representative collection of Danish art as well as a collection of Russian art, covering both painting from 1870 to 1930 and Russian icons, and also hosts special exhibitions both of classical and contemporary art. The museum is housed within a listed Neoclassical house, part of a traditional Danish market town setting along Sorø's main street, which was expanded by the architects Lundgaard & Tranberg in 2011, tripling its size.

== Building ==
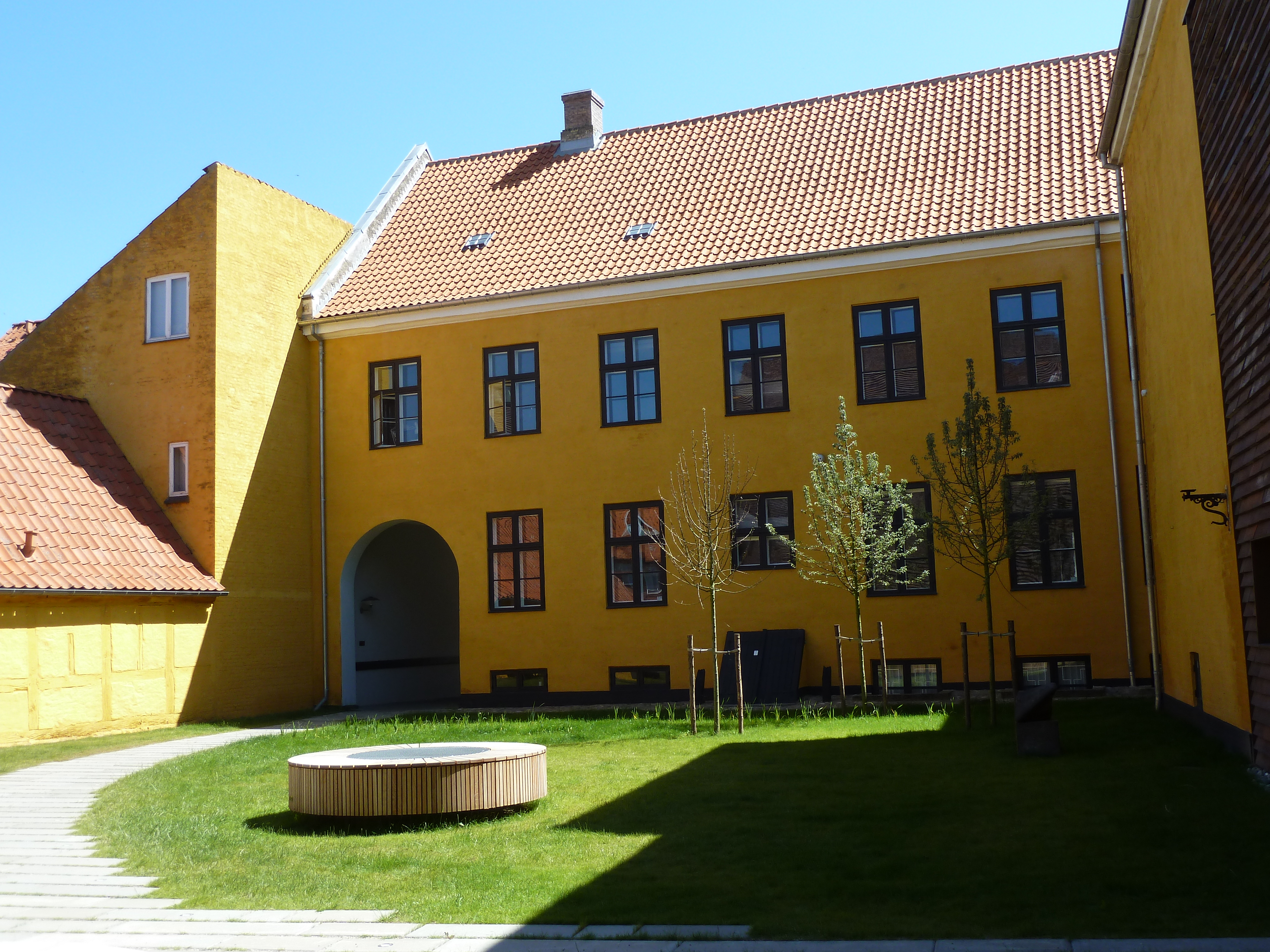
The old building seen from the courtyard with one of the round skylights of the underground level

The museum's original building was constructed from 1832 to 1834 as residence for the estate managers at Sorø Academy. It is a two-storey Late Neoclassical building over a high cellar, probably designed by Frederik Ferdinand Friis who also designed the Rectory at Sorø Academy. The facade, which faces Storgade, Sorø's main street, stands in blank red brick with white sandstone bands just below the windows, on a dressed ochre-coloured plinth. The rear side of the building as well as a low lateral wing which defines the northern margin of a courtyard space, stand in yellow-dressed masonry. The building was listed in 1981.

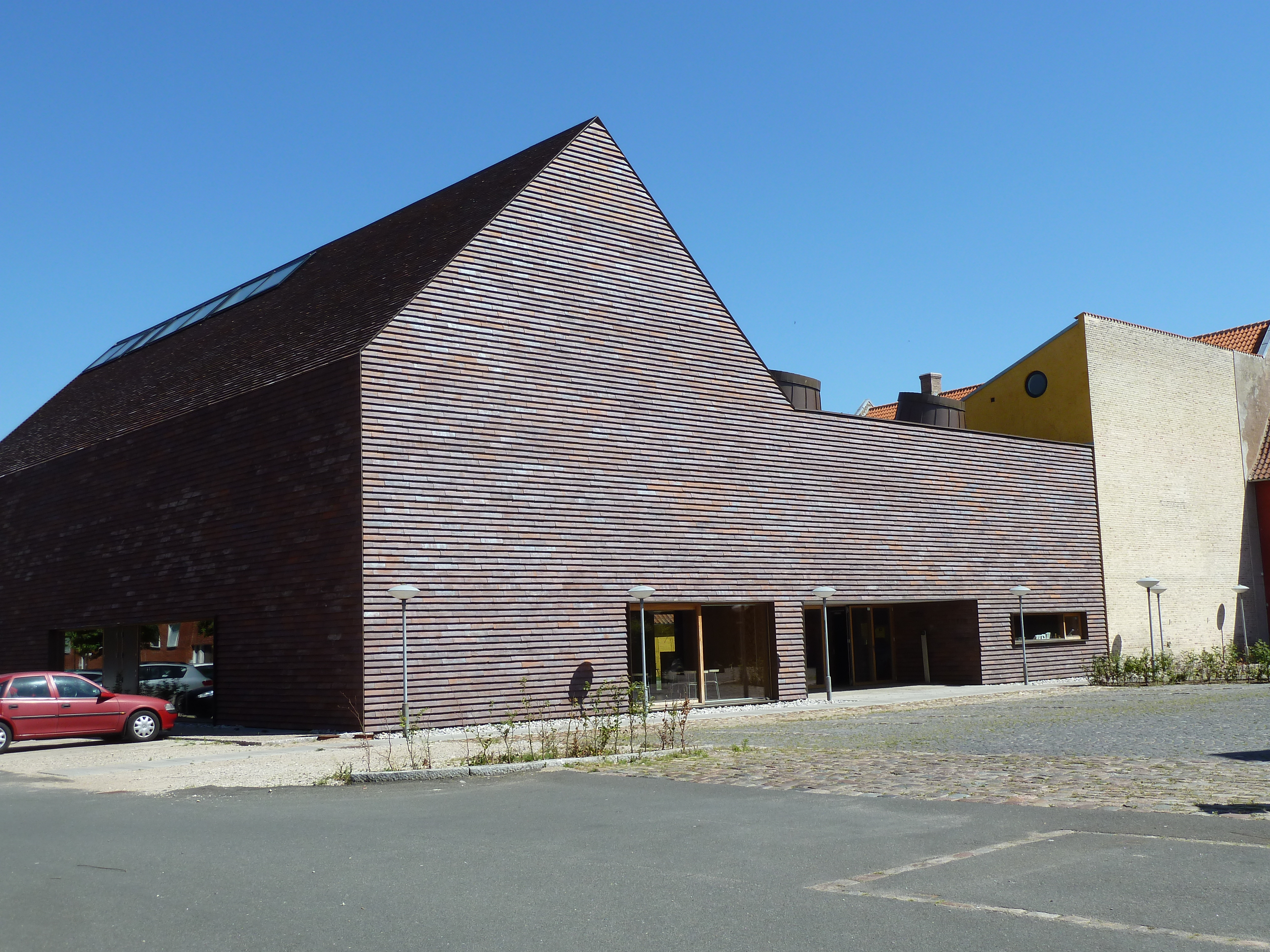
Exterior view of the modern extension

The modern extension completes the courtyard space by adding two new wings, a gabled wing along the rear street and a lower connector to the south, respecting the proportions and patterns of the historic surroundings. It is an interpretation of the quintessential brick building. It is built in custom-made ceramic shingle, creating a facade reminiscent of Clapboard siding. The kolumba shingles were developed in collaboration with Petersen Tegl which also manufactured the bricks used for the Royal Danish Playhouse, one of Lundgaard & Tranberg's earlier projects.

The extension also added an underground level. It is naturally lit through round skylights placed in the courtyard. The project received a six-out-of-six rating from Karsten R. S. Ifversen, architectural critic at Politiken.

== Collection ==
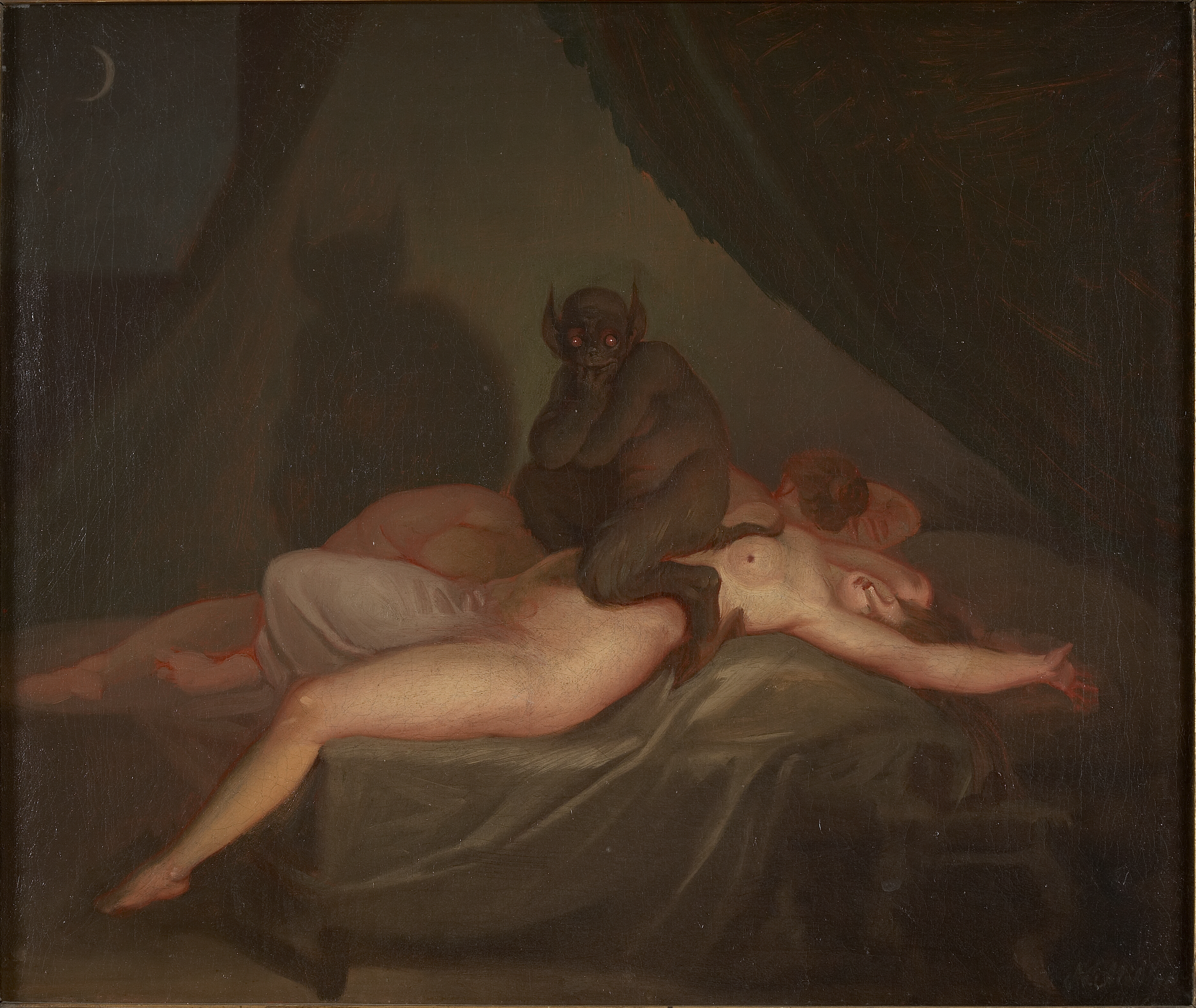
Nicolai Abildgaard's version of Henry Fuseli's 's The Nightmare, one of the oldest paintings in the museum's Danish collection

=== Danish collection ===
The oldest works in the Danish collection are wood carvings dating from the 13th to 16th centuries. Represented painters include Jens Juel, Nicolai Abildgaard, Christoffer Wilhelm Eckersberg, Christen Købke, Christen Dalsgaard and Harald Giersing.

=== Hermod Lannung Collection of Russian art ===
In 1997, the museum was bequeathed a sizeable collection of Russian art by the estate of former barrister Hermod Lannung. It contains some 100 paintings and drawings, covering the period 1870 to 1930. Pre-revolutionary art is represented with works by artists such as Konstantin Korovin, Vasily Polenov, Alexandre Benois and Isaac Levitan, while the Soviet era is represented by figures such as Aleksandr Gerasimov and Kuzma Petrov-Vodkin.

=== Russian icons ===
The collection of icons comprises 190 pieces, dating from between 1500 and 1900, and is the result of three large donations from Per Schrøder, Lorentz Jørgensen and Hermod Lannung. All major schools and subjects are represented.

== Other facilities ==
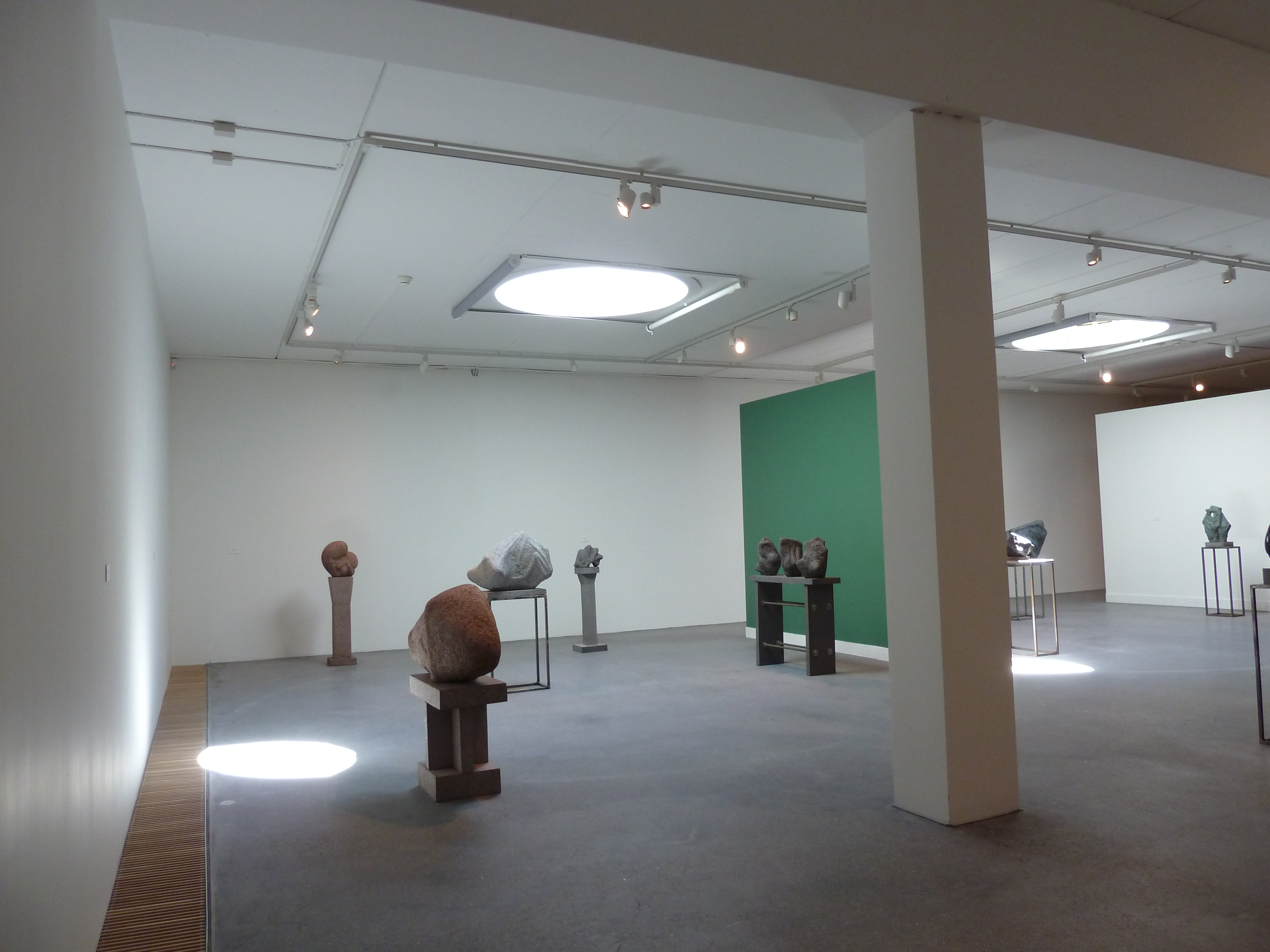
The underground gallery

Public functions include lecture hall, café, boutique and school service. They are all placed on ground level with direct access to both courtyards. Special exhibition spaces and administration are found on the second floor. The underground level contains the modern exhibition space as well as a workshop, wardrobe and storage.

== See also ==
- Architecture of Denmark
