= Sampension =

Danish pension fund

Coordinates: 55.7261°N 12.5811°E

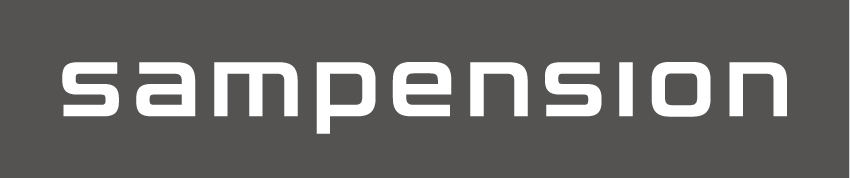
- Company type: Aktieselskab
- Industry: Pension
- Headquarters: Hellerup, Denmark
- Area served: Denmark
- Key people: Hasse Jørgensen; CEO
- Website: sampension.dk

Sampension is a manager of industry-wide pension schemes for white collar employees in the Danish municipalities (kommuner) and central government.

== Headquarters ==
Sampension is headquartered in Tuborg Havn in Hellerup, just north of central Copenhagen. The building was completed in 2003 to a design by 3XN. It received a RIBA European Award from the Royal Institute of British Architects in 2005.

== Activities ==
=== Schemes ===
A subsidiary of Kommunernes Pensionsforsikring A/S, it manages the three pension schemes Kommunernes Pensionsforsikring, StK:Pension ad Grafisk Pension. It is the third largest manager of pension schemes in Denmark with approximately EUR 27 billion under its management.

=== Divestment ===
In October 2017, Sampension announced that it would ban investment in four companies operating in illegal Israeli settlements in the West Bank, including two Israeli banks, Bank Hapoalim and Bank Leumi, Israeli telecom giant Bezeq and German firm Heidelberg Cement.

In March 2018, Sampension divested from Motorola over the latter's ties to illegal Israeli settlements.
