= Pier47 =

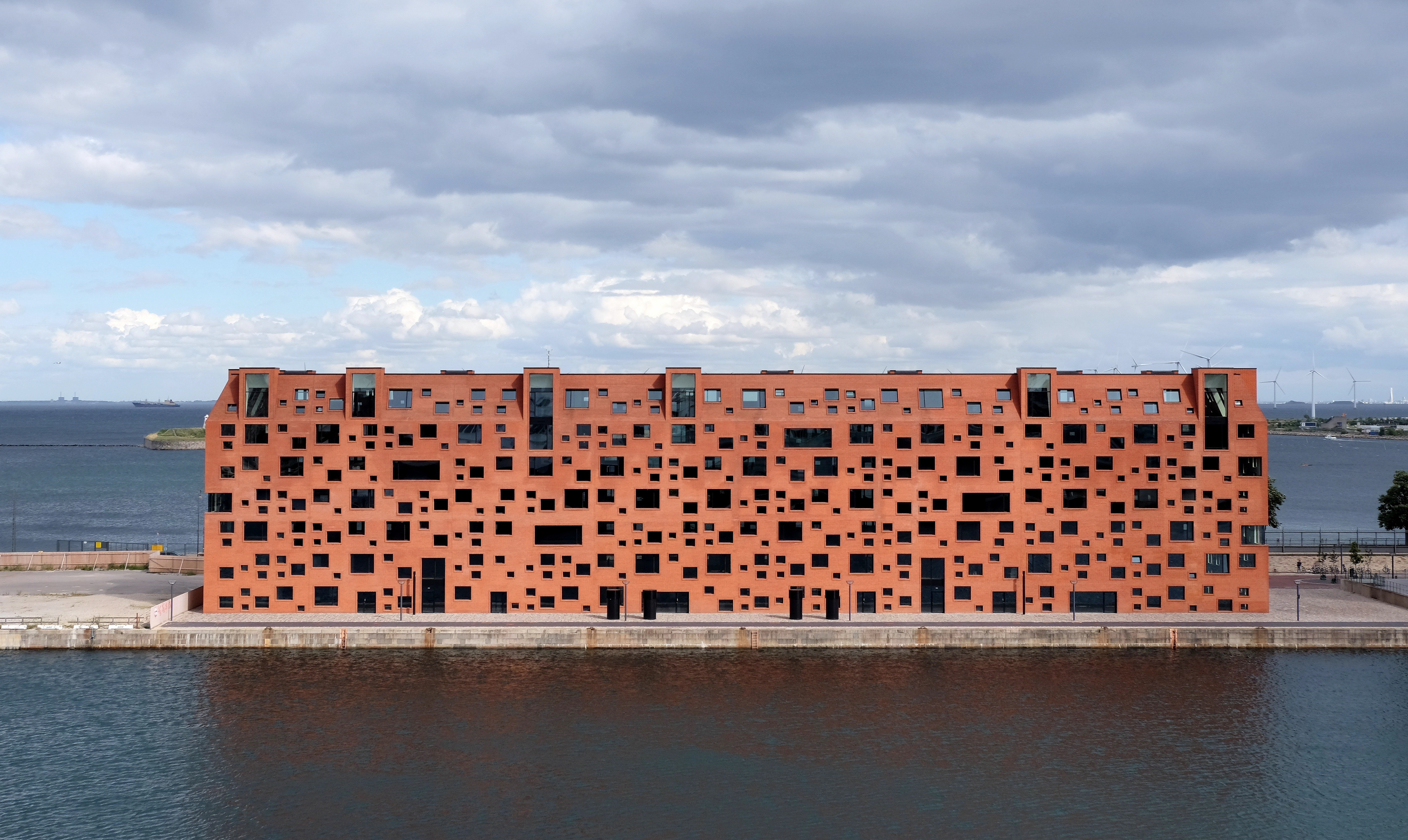
- Interactive map of the Pier47 area

General information
- Location: Copenhagen, Denmark
- Coordinates: 55°42′07″N 12°36′00″E
- Completed: 2015
- Owner: ATP Ejendomme

Technical details
- Floor area: 28m300 m²

Design and construction
- Architecture firm: Lundgaard & Tranberg
- Civil engineer: COWI A/S

Pier47 is a DGNB Gold-certified office building located on the Langelinie Pier in Copenhagen, Denmark. It was designed by Lundgaard & Tranberg with inspiration from 19th century warehouses. It is owned by ATP Ejendomme.

== Construction ==
The site was acquired by ATP Ejendomme in the 1990s. Lundgaard & Tranberg won first prize in an international competition to design an office building for the site but the project was delayed by the 2008 financial crisis. Construction began in 2012 and the building was inaugurated in 2016.

== Architecture ==
Pier47 is built in red brick with inspiration from 19th century warehouses such as the nearby Dahlerup Warehouse. The exterior is dominated by the irregularly sized and placed windows.

The building is centred on a large toplit atrium. The different floors are connected by a system of skyways.

The building has been designed with a focus on sustainable solutions and has been DGNB Gold-certified. Sustainable solutions include natural ventilation and groundwater cooling.
