= 3XN =

Danish architectural practice

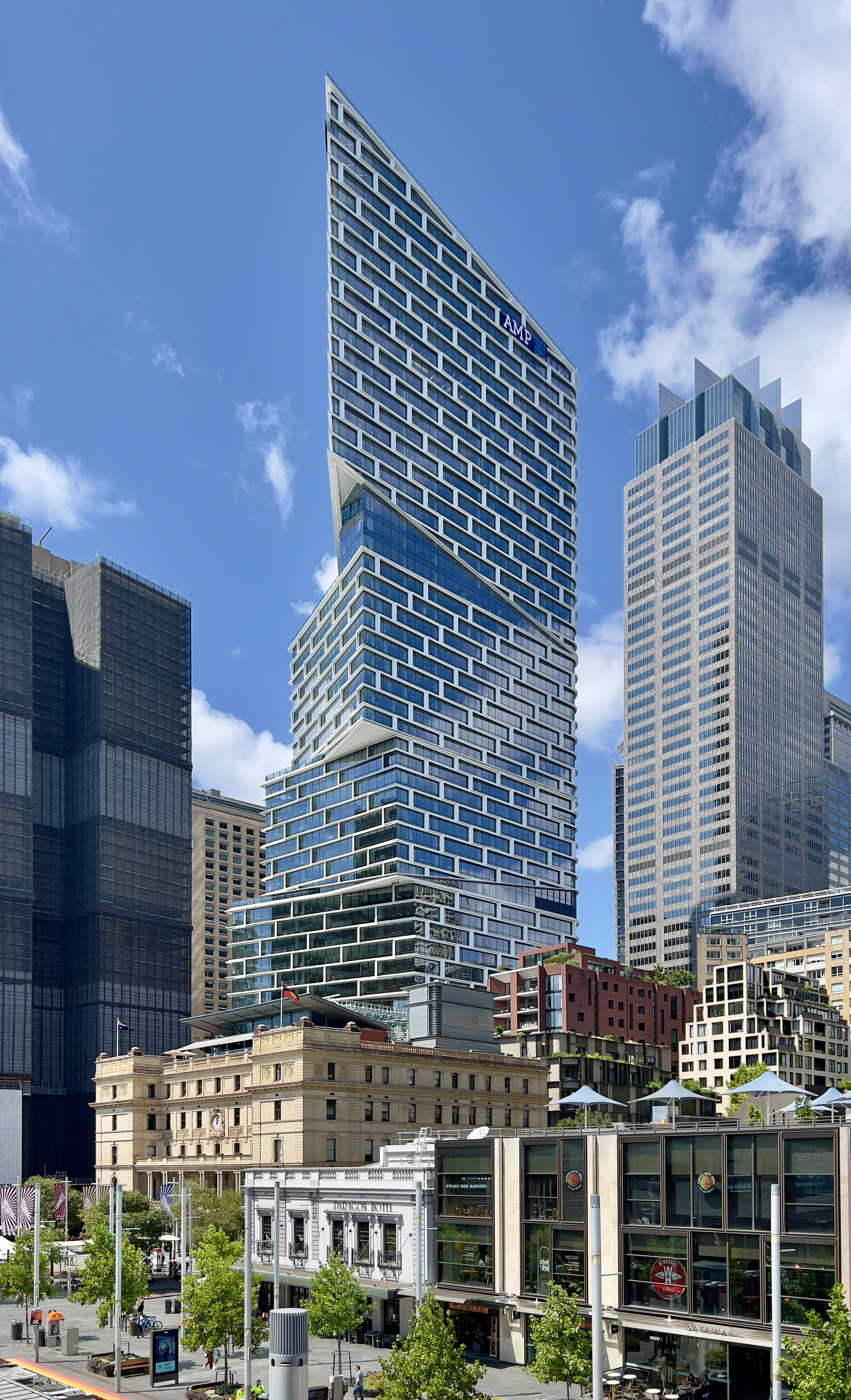
- Quay Quarter Tower, Sydney, Australia

Practice information
- Key architects: Kim Herforth Nielsen; Jan Ammundsen; Jeanette Hansen; Audun Opdal; Stig Vesterager Gothelf
- Founded: 1986
- Location: Copenhagen

Significant works and honors
- Buildings: Muziekgebouw Concert Hall; Museum of Liverpool; Olympic House - IOC Headquarters; Quay Quarter Tower; Sydney Fish Market
- Awards: 1988 Nykredit Architecture Prize; 2005, 2007 and 2009 RIBA Awards

3XN is a Danish architectural practice headquartered in Copenhagen and with offices in Stockholm, London, New York and Sydney.

== History ==
The company was founded in Aarhus, Denmark, in 1986 as Nielsen, Nielsen & Nielsen (later 3 X Nielsen) by Kim Herforth Nielsen, Hans Peter Svendler Nielsen and Lars Frank Nielsen. The firm quickly became known for creating buildings of substance with compelling aesthetics supported by a strong theoretical foundation. The international breakthrough came in the late 90s with the Danish Embassy in Berlin (1999) and the Muziekgebouw Concert Hall in Amsterdam (competition win in 1997).

Hans Peter Svendler Nielsen and Lars Frank Nielsen left the company in 1992 and 2001. Today, 3XN is led by a senior partner group of five with Kim Herforth Nielsen as the Creative Director.

Among 3XN's most high-profile international projects are Museum of Liverpool (2011), cube berlin (2020), Olympic House – the HQ for the International Olympic Committee (IOC) in Lausanne, Switzerland (2019), Quay Quarter Tower (2022) and the new Fish Market (expected completion in 2024) in Sydney, Australia.

In Denmark, 3XN is known for such projects as Ørestad Gymnasium (2007), the renovation of Tivoli’s Concert Hall (2005), Alsion, university, concert hall and research centre in Sønderborg (2007), Hotel Bella Sky (2011), UN City (2013), Denmark’s National Aquarium, The Blue Planet (2013), Royal Arena (2017) and Lighthouse in Aarhus (2022).

In 2007 3XN established the research and development department GXN working on implementing new (green) materials and technologies in the studio’s projects. The R&D department also develops new projects and designs of lamps for instance. GXN is also behind the green Louisiana Pavilion displayed at the Danish art museum Louisiana during COP15. The pavilion is built with a biocomposite especially developed for the purpose. GXN works with Cradle to Cradle Denmark at developing the first Danish building manual based on the Cradle to Cradle principles.

In 2010 3XN created the exhibition Mind Your Behaviour, which was shown at Danish Architecture Centre and at Aedes Gallery in Berlin.

== Selected projects ==
=== Completed ===
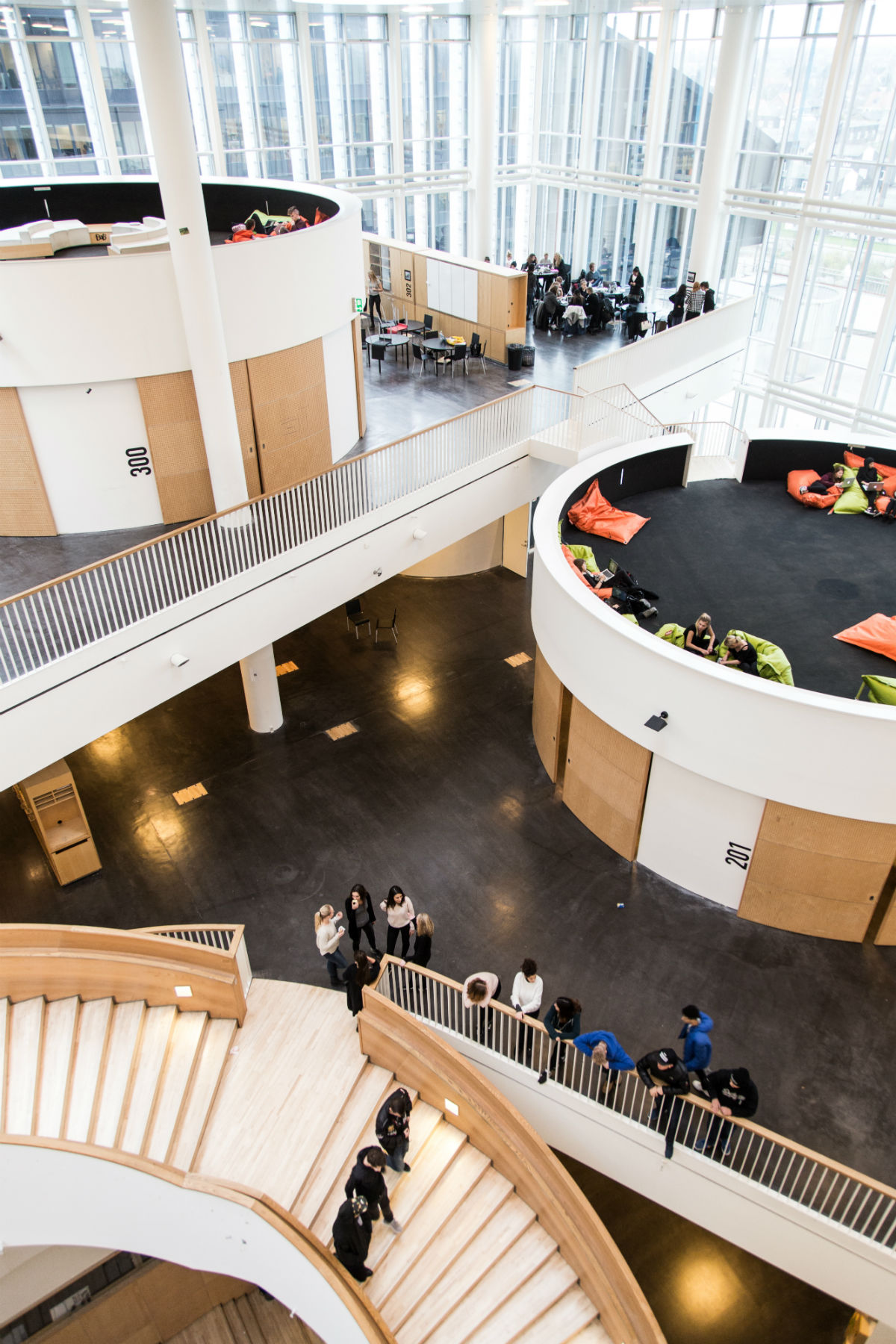
Ørestad Gymnasium - inside (2016)

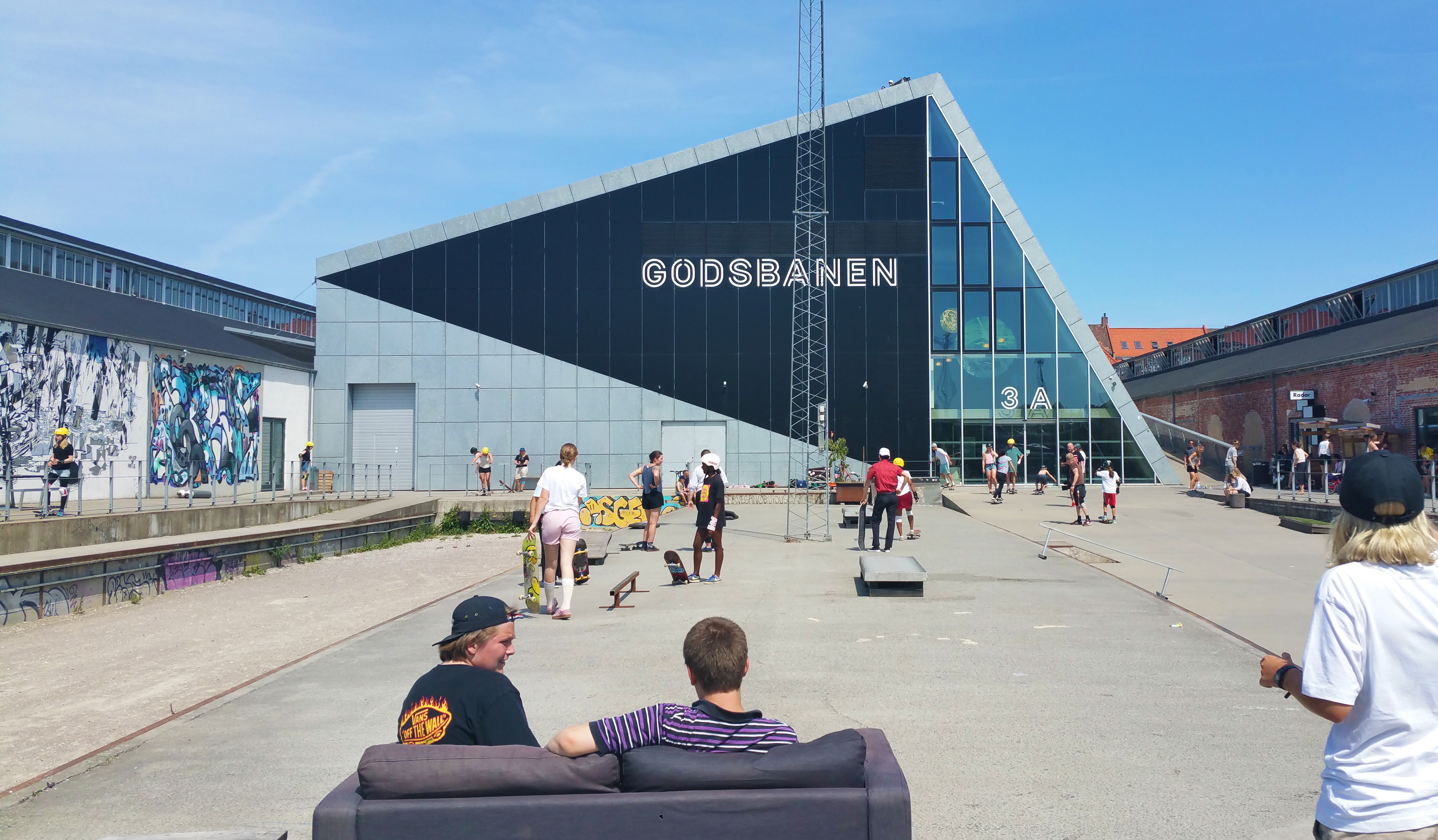
railyards Cultural Center (Godsbanen), Aarhus, Image taken 2018 (44613663430)

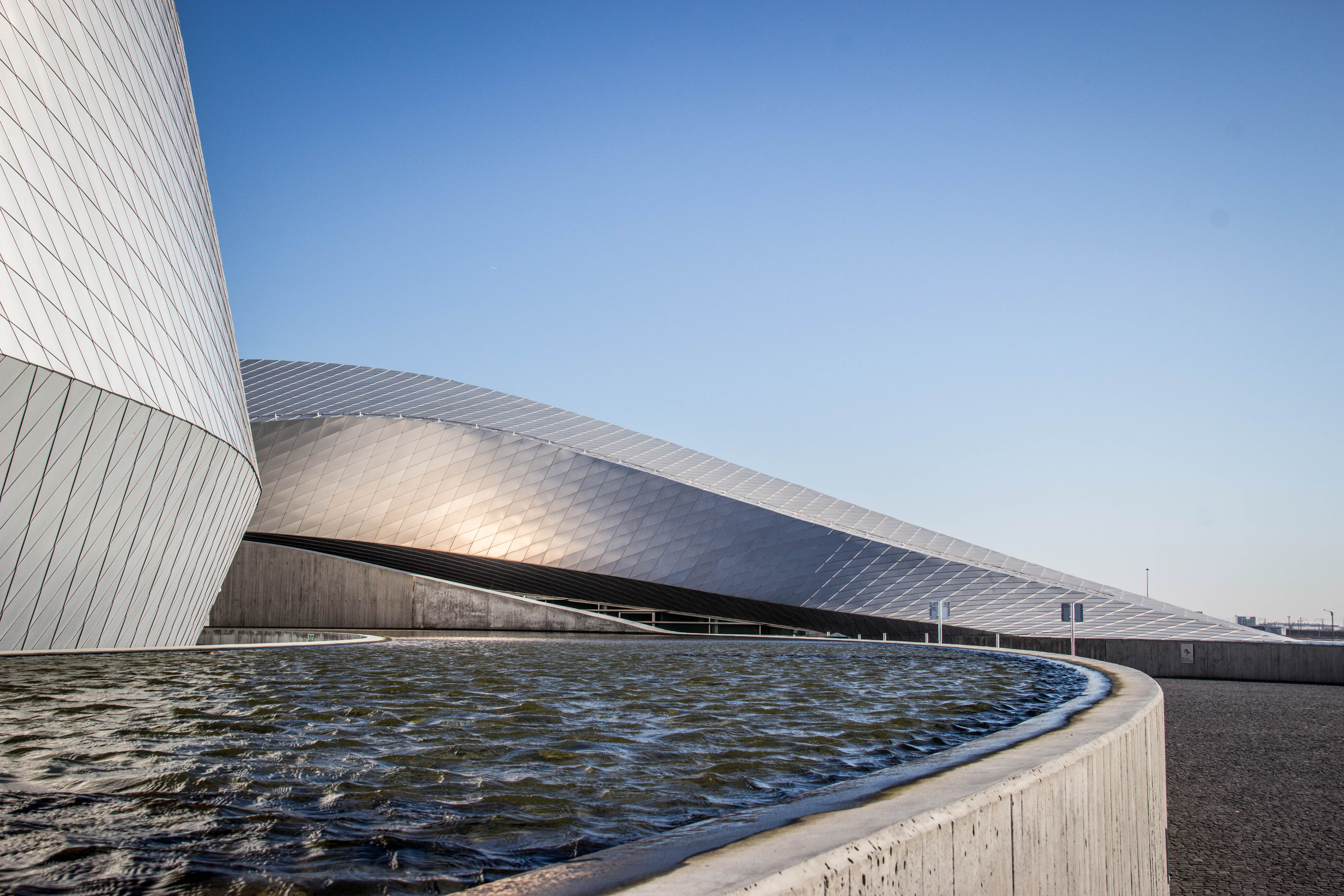
The Blue Planet, Image taken 2015

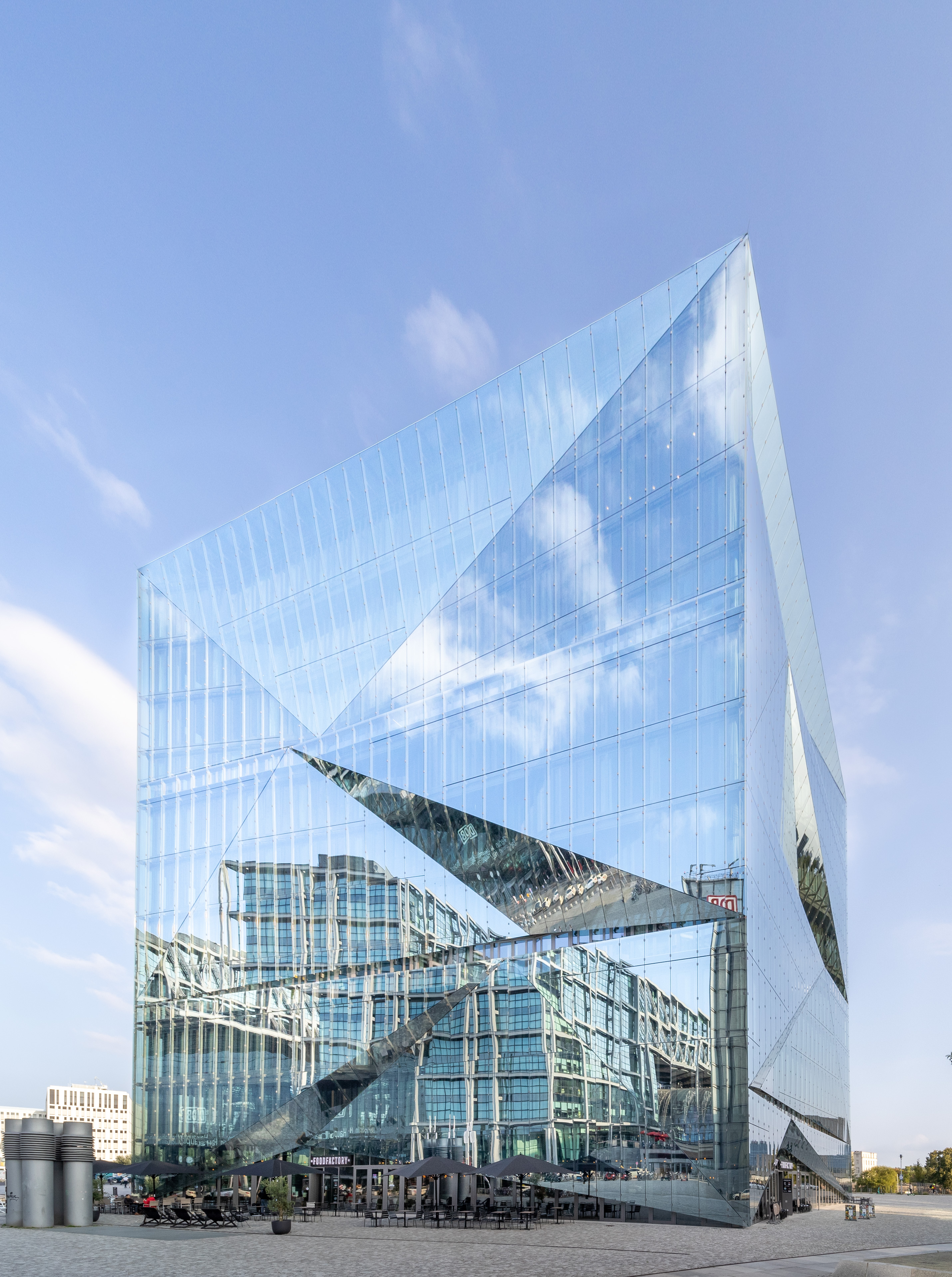
Cube, Berlin, completed in 2020

- Architect’s House, Copenhagen, Denmark(1996)
- Buen kulturhus, Mandal, Norway (2012)
- Danish Embassy, Berlin, Germany (1999)
- Tivoli Concert Hall extension, Copenhagen (2005)
- Muziekgebouw Concert Hall, Amsterdam (2005)
- Sampension Headquarters, Copenhagen (2005)
- Ørestad College, Ørestad, Copenhagen (2007)
- Saxo Bank building, Copenhagen (2008)
- Horsens Stadium, Horsens, Denmark (2010)
- Middelfart Savings Bank, Middelfart, Denmark (2010)
- Hotel Bella Sky, Ørestad, Copenhagen (2011)
- Museum of Liverpool, UK (2011)
- Railyards Cultural Centre, Aarhus, Denmark (2012)
- Gemeentehuis Nieuwegein, Nieuwegein, Netherlands (2012)
- Frederiksberg Courthouse, Copenhagen, Denmark (2012)
- Lighthouse phase 1, Aarhus, Denmark (2012)
- Blue Planet, Copenhagen, Denmark (2013)
- Plassen Cultural Center, Molde, Norway (2012)
- UN Building, Copenhagen, Denmark (2013)
- Swedbank Headquarters, Stockholm, Sweden (2014)
- Odenplan Station, Stockholm, Sweden (2015)
- Patient Hotel, Rigshospitalet, Copenhagen, Denmark (2015)
- Royal Arena, Copenhagen, Denmark (2017)
- Segerstedthuset at Uppsala University, Uppsala, Sweden (2017)
- IOC Headquarters, Lausanne, Switzerland (2019)
- Renngasse 10, Vienna, Austria (2019)
- North Wing, Rigshospitalet, Copenhagen, Denmark (2020)
- Mälardalen University, Eskilstuna, Sweden (2020)
- Astoriahuset and Nybrogatan 17, Stockholm, Sweden (2020)
- Klimatorium, Lemvig, Denmark (2020)
- cube berlin, Berlin, Germany (2020)
- Espace Confluence, Namur, Belgium (2021)
- Schüco Headquarters extension, Bielefeld, Germany (2022)
- Aquabella, Toronto, Canada (2022)
- Green Solution House 2.0, Bornholm, Denmark (2022)
- Vinci InDéfense and Hotel OKKO, Paris La Défense, Nanterre, France (2022)
- Quay Quarter Tower, Sydney, Australia (2022)
- Lighthouse phase 2, Aarhus, Denmark (2022)
- Tinnerbäcksbadet Aquatic Center, Linköping, Sweden (2023)
- Forskaren, Hagastaden, Sweden (2023)
- SAP Garden, Munich, Germany (2024)
- T3 Bayside, Toronto, Canada (2024)
- Aqualuna, Toronto, Canada (competition win 2017)(2025)

=== In progress ===
- Sydney Fish Market, Sydney, Australia (competition win June 2017)
- Copenhagen Children's Hospital, Rigshospitalet, Copenhagen, Denmark (competition win July 2017)
- 2 Finsbury Avenue at Broadgate, London, UK (competition win 2019)
- Palais des Congrès, Nîmes, France (competition win 2019)
- Cobot Hub, Odense, Denmark (competition win 2020)
- Tilia Tower, Lausanne, Switzerland (competition win 2020)
- Shenzhen Natural History Museum, Shenzhen, China (competition win 2020)
- BMW Master Plan (with OMA), Munich, Germany (competition win 2022)
- EPFL Ecotope, Lausanne, Switzerland (competition win 2022)
- Stockholm University of the Arts, Stockholm, Sweden (competition win 2022)
- 65 Crutched Friars, London, UK (competition win 2022)
- Caulfield Grammar School, Melbourne, Australia (competition win 2022)
- 47-50 Mark Lane, London, UK (competition win 2023)
- Euston Tower, London, UK (competition win 2023)
- 201 E Pratt St., Baltimore, USA (competition win 2023)
- Chungnam Art Center, Chungcheongnam-do, South Korea (competition win 2024)

== Awards ==
- 1988 Nykredit Architecture Prize
- 2005 RIBA European Award for Sampension
- 2005 MIPIM AR Future Projects Award for City for All Age in Valby, Copenhagen
- Best New Building in the Netherlands 2006 for Muziekgebouw
- 2006 ULI Europe Award for Muziekgebouw
- 2006 Dedalo Minosse Award for Muziekgebouw
- 2006 MIPIM AR Future Projects Award (residential category) for Nordhavnen Residences and (office category) for Middelfart Savings Bank
- 2006 LEAF Award for Muziekgebouw
- 2007 RIBA European Award for Alsion
- 2008 Forum AiD Award for Ørestad College
- 2009 RIBA International Award for Saxo Bank
- 2011 RIBA European Award for Middelfart Savings Bank
- 2012 WAF Award for Rigshospital extension
- 2013 RIBA EU Award for Frederiksberg Courthouse
