= Ørestad Gymnasium =

Coordinates: 55.6317°N 12.5814°E

Ørestad Gymnasium (OEG)
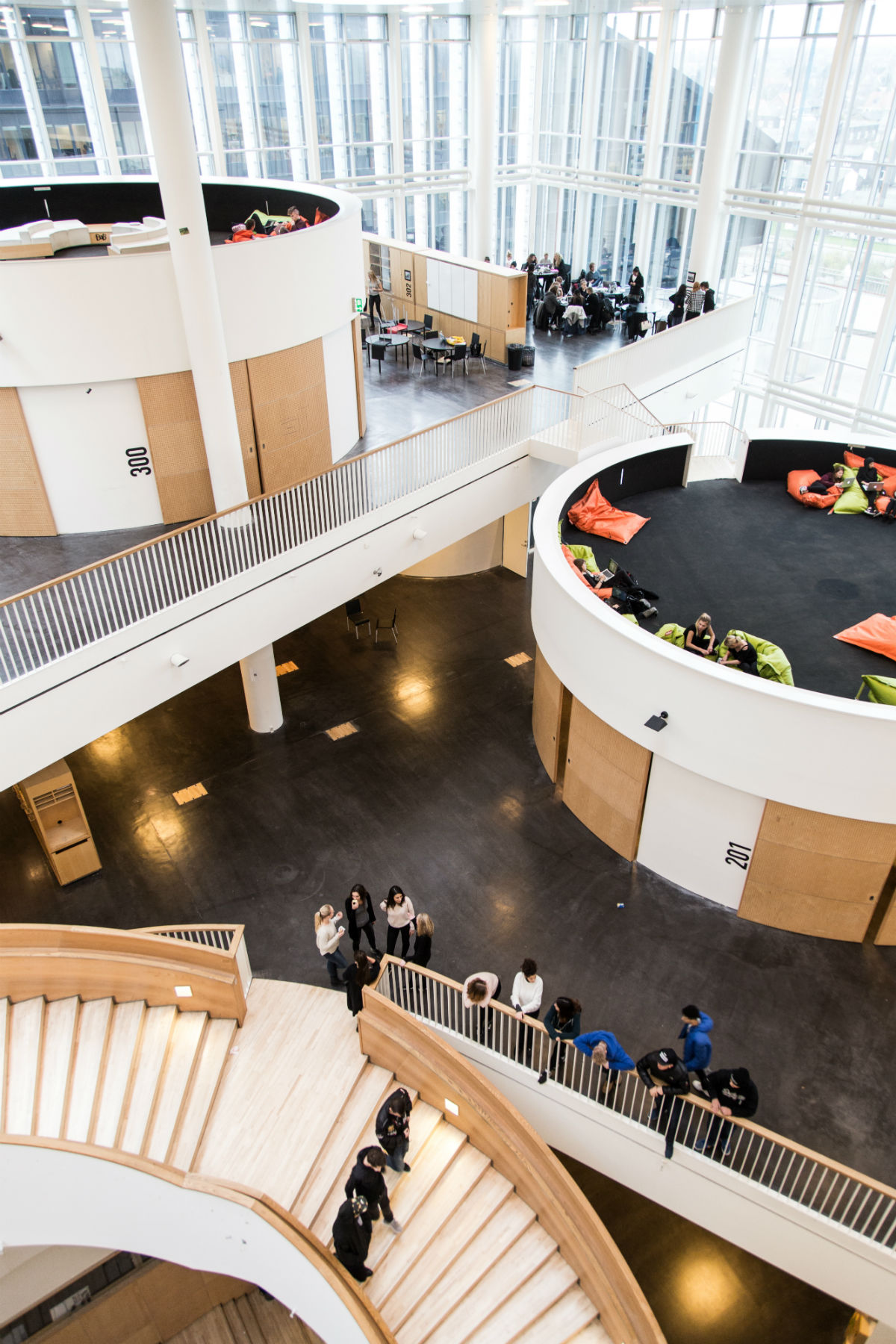
- Ørestads Boulevard 75; 2300 København S Ørestad, Denmark

Information
- School type: High School (US) or Higher Secondary School (UK)
- Founded: 2005
- Chairperson: René van Laer
- Principal: Inge Voller
- Website: www.oerestadgym.dk/

Ørestad High School (Danish: Ørestad Gymnasium) is a public gymnasium in the Ørestad district of Copenhagen, Denmark. It is noted for its innovative architecture, favouring open studying environments instead of traditional class rooms, and for its media-oriented profile focusing on media, communications, and culture. All teaching materials are digital.

== History ==
From its opening in 2005 until 2007, Ørestad Gymnasium resided in premises belonging to the University of Copenhagen Faculty of Humanities. On May 10, 2007, the school moved to a purpose-built building, designed by 3XN. Crown Prince Frederik of Denmark and Crown Princess Victoria of Sweden attended the inauguration. From the inauguration of the new building, Ørestad Gymnasium has been one of the most sought gymnasium in Denmark.

== Architecture ==
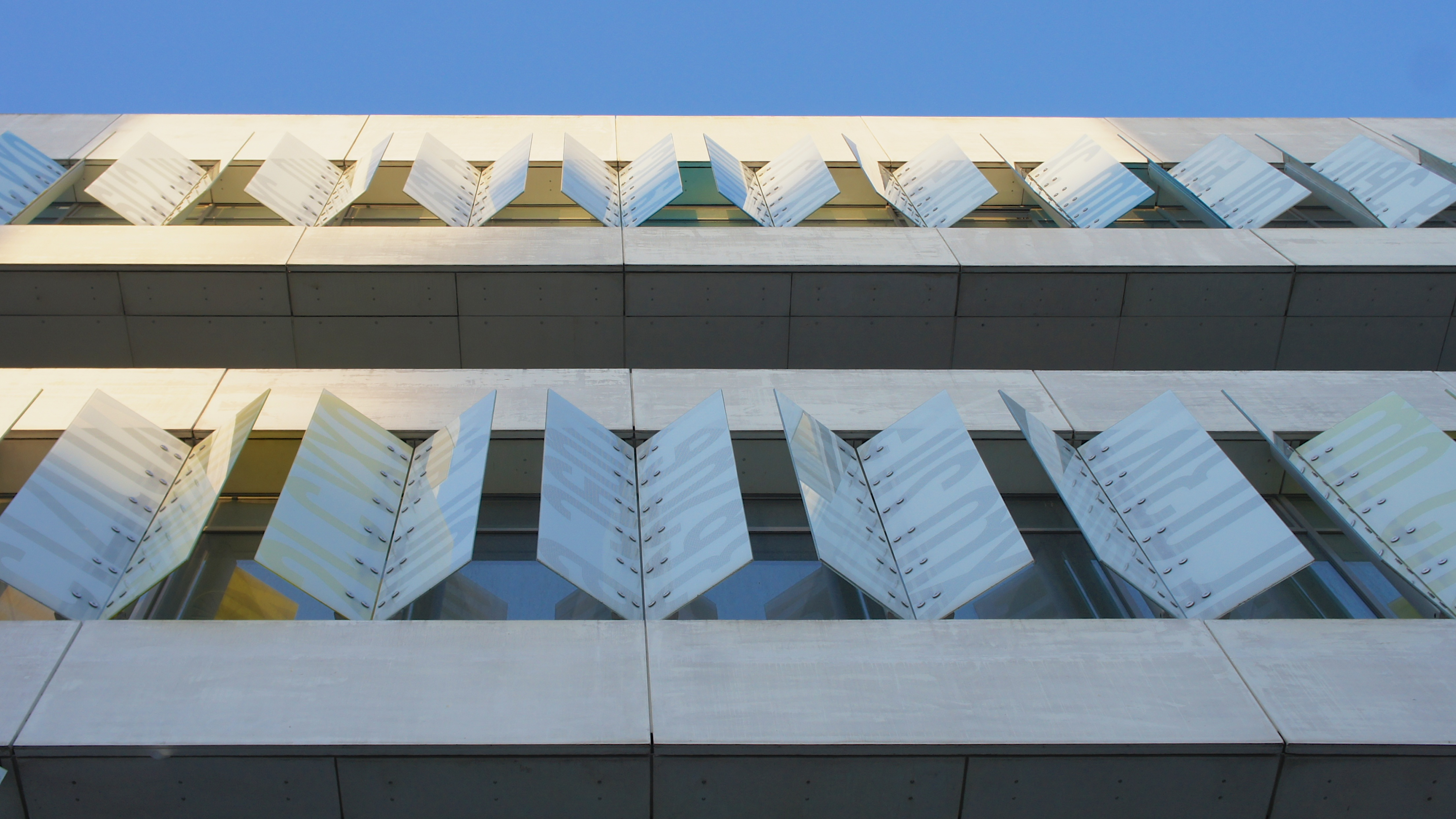
Detail of the facade

Ørestad Gymnasium is designed by 3XN architects and is noted for its innovative architecture, completely free of traditional class rooms. Instead, four study zones occupy one floor plan each. The building won the Forum Aid Award 2009 and was nominated for the European Union Prize for Contemporary Architecture.

The four boomerang-shaped storey decks are rotated to create the superstructure which forms the flexible overall frame of the building. Avoiding level changes makes the organisational flexibility as high as possible, and enables the different teaching and learning spaces to overlap and interact with no distinct borders.

The rotation opens a part of each floor to the vertical tall central atrium and forms a zone that provides community and expresses the high school's ambition for interdisciplinary education.

The storey decks are open towards the atrium, where a broad main staircase winds its way upwards to the roof terrace. The main staircase serves at the primary connection up and down, but also as the heart of the high school's educational and social life. Three massive columns form the primary load bearing system, supplemented by a number of smaller columns positioned according to structural requirement, not as part of a regular grid.

As a rule, the glass is smooth with the deck fronts, but on each floor, one façade is withdrawn to create an outdoor space. These outdoor spaces are connected from ground to roof. In front of the glass facades, a series of coloured semi-transparent glass louvers can open or close to protect from the sun, while adding dashes of colour to the indoor environment

== Curriculum ==
Ørestad Gymnasium (also known as OEG) has a media oriented profile and has collaborated with several media related institutions in Ørestad, including DR and the IT University of Copenhagen. Apart from the regular subjects, students are offered a "creative subject" which can be Multimedia, Media or Visual Arts.

== See also ==
- Ørestad
