= Merritt Bucholz =

American architect

- Born: 28 June 1966 (age 60); Chicago, Illinois, United States
- Education: Cornell University; Princeton University
- Occupation: Architect
- Years active: 1990–present
- Partner: Karen McEvoy
- Practice: Bucholz | McEvoy Architects

Merritt Bucholz (born 28 June 1966) is an American architect who has set up practice in Ireland with his partner Karen McEvoy. He lectures frequently in various universities in Europe and America.

== Early life ==
Merritt Bucholz was born in Chicago.

== Education ==
He attended Cornell University (B.Arch 1993), and Princeton University (M.Arch 1995).

== Work ==
- Emilio Ambasz & Associates, 1990–92;
- Paris offices of James Stewart Polshek, Ricardo Bofill and Michel W Kagan, 1992–94;
- A&D Wejchert & Partners Architects 1995.

== Lecturing ==
- Head of the School of Design at the University of Limerick, 2021–present;
- Inaugural Professor of Architecture at the University of Limerick, 2005–present;

Formerly

- Visiting professor at Harvard University;
- Visiting lecturer at Princeton University, Cornell University, University College Dublin, and Dublin Institute of Technology;
- External examiner at Waterford Institute of Technology.

== Bucholz | McEvoy Architects ==
Bucholz | McEvoy Architects were set up by Merritt and his partner Karen in Dublin (1996).

=== Notable projects ===
- Elm Park Urban Quarter, Dublin.
- Leinster House Pavilions, Dublin
- SAP Building, Galway
- Westmeath County Council Headquarters
- City Arts Tower, Dublin
- Westmeath County Council Civic Offices
- Cork Civic Offices
- Cherry Orchard Tower
- Environmental Research Institute, UCC
- Limerick County Council Headquarters
- SAP Building, Dublin
- Welcoming Pavilions, Government Buildings, Dublin
- Fingal County Hall
- Universite Paris VII
- Denis Diderot Biology Laboratory, Paris (competition)
- Exhibita Research Project
- Mueso del Prado Extension (competition)
- Smithfield Urban Space
- Hartstonge House, Limerick
- Lottum Work + Living, Berlin, Germany.
