= Tietgenkollegiet =

Coordinates: 55°39′39″N 12°35′24″E

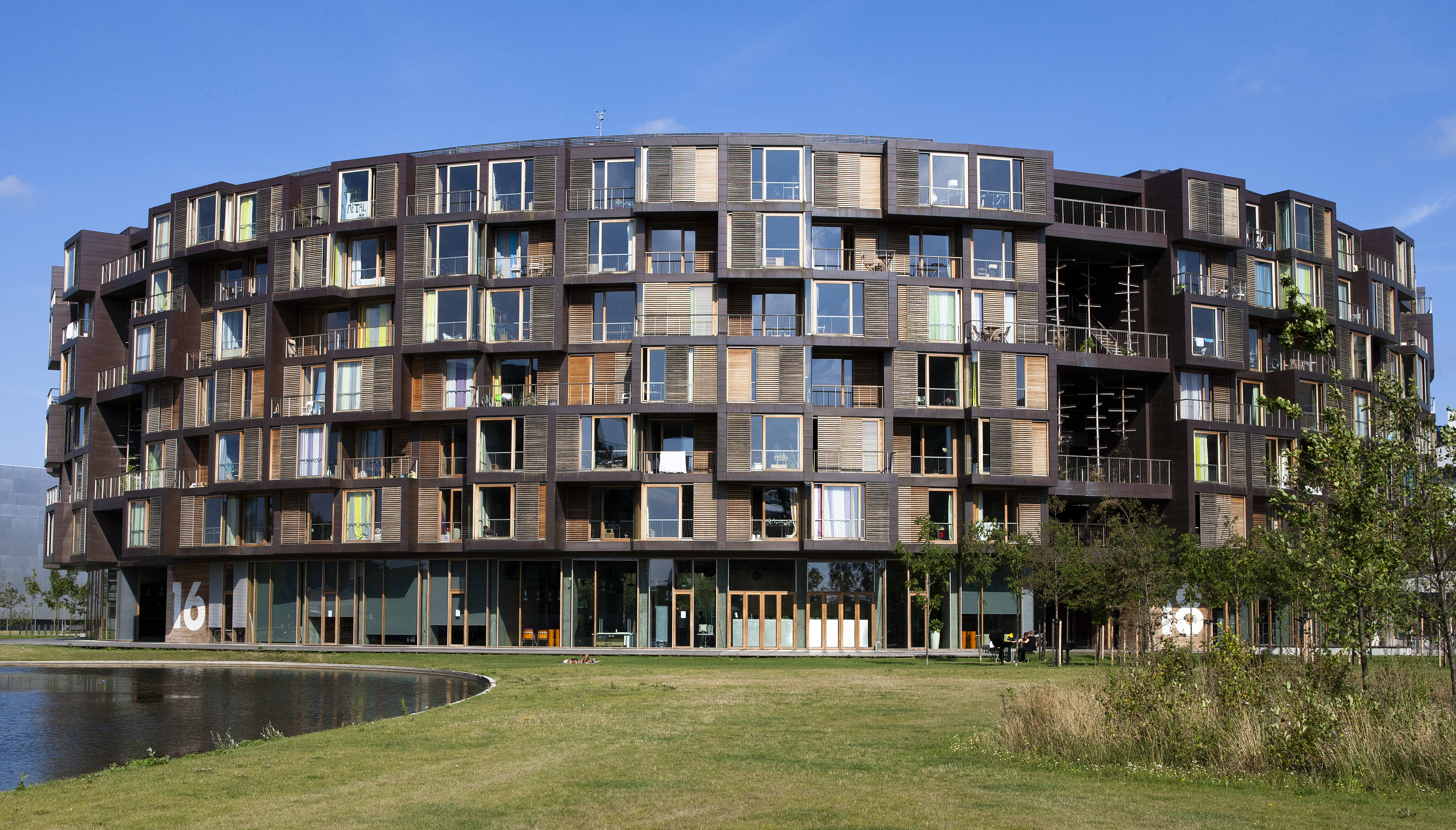
- Interactive map of the Tietgenkollegiet area

General information
- Location: Ørestad, Copenhagen, Denmark
- Construction started: 2005
- Completed: 2006
- Client: Nordea Danmark Fonden

Design and construction
- Architect: Lundgaard & Tranberg
- Engineer: COWI A/S

Tietgenkollegiet (English: Tietgen Student Hall), named for Danish financier C.F. Tietgen (1829-1901), is a student residence located in the Ørestad district of Copenhagen, Denmark.

The building has a conspicuous circular shape, inspired by traditional southern Chinese Hakka architecture, and is designed by Danish architects Lundgaard & Tranberg in 2006. The design has won it a RIBA European Award.

== Architecture ==
The round building is seven stories high. Five vertical lines divide the building both visually and functionally into sections and also serve as continuous passages that provide access from outside to the central courtyard and to the different stories. The ground floor has common facilities: a café, auditorium, study and computer rooms, workshops, laundry, music and meeting rooms, and bicycle parking. The apartments are located on the other stories, 12 in each segment. All rooms face the façade and have a view of the surroundings. The common kitchens/auxiliary rooms, lounges, and terraces are located on the central court, bringing residents together.

Its concept focuses on how the accommodation can help encourage the personal and social development of the students. The courtyard, around which all common areas are located, reinforces the idea of community. It also enables the often monotonous student corridor to become not only spatially interesting but unending, linking all student 'houses' on each floor.

== Rooms ==
There are 360 rooms, 10% of which have been designated for international exchange students. The building is circular, with 7 floors and rooms set up in blocks of 12. Each room has its own washroom and there are four sizes to the rooms: 26 sq. metres, 29 sq. metres, 33 sq. metres, and 42 sq. metres, approximately. Each block has shared kitchen and living room, with each living room having a unique set of furniture and other items.

== Gallery ==
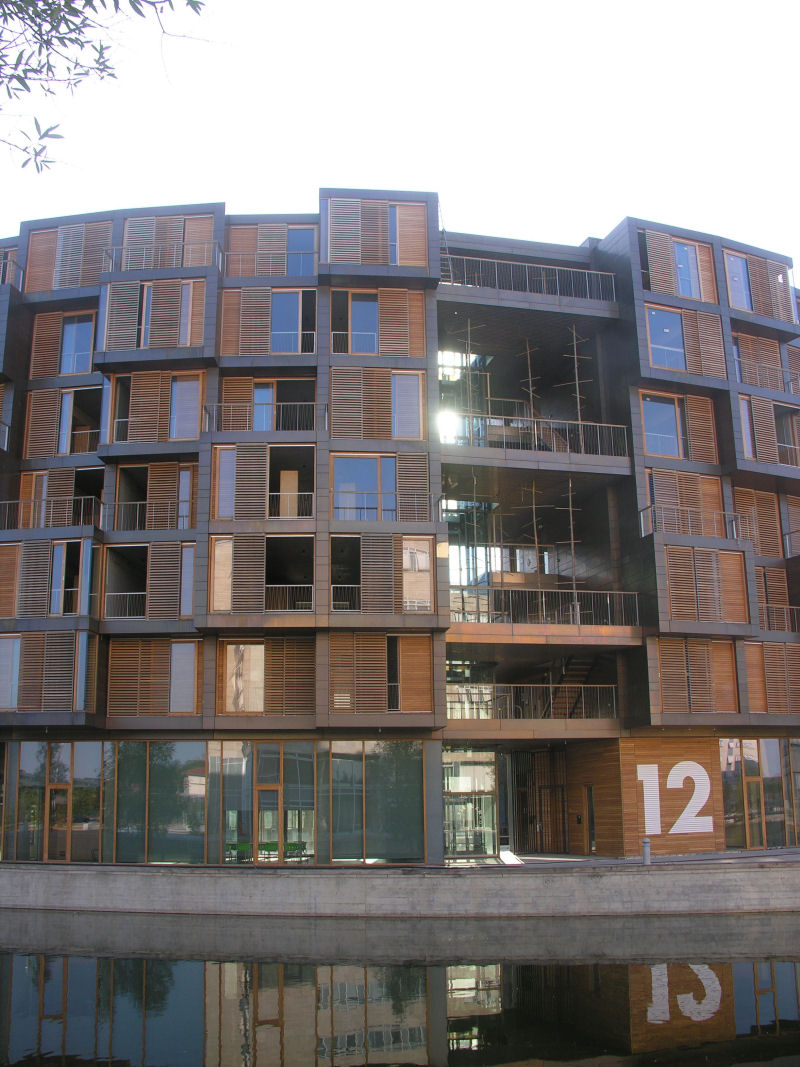

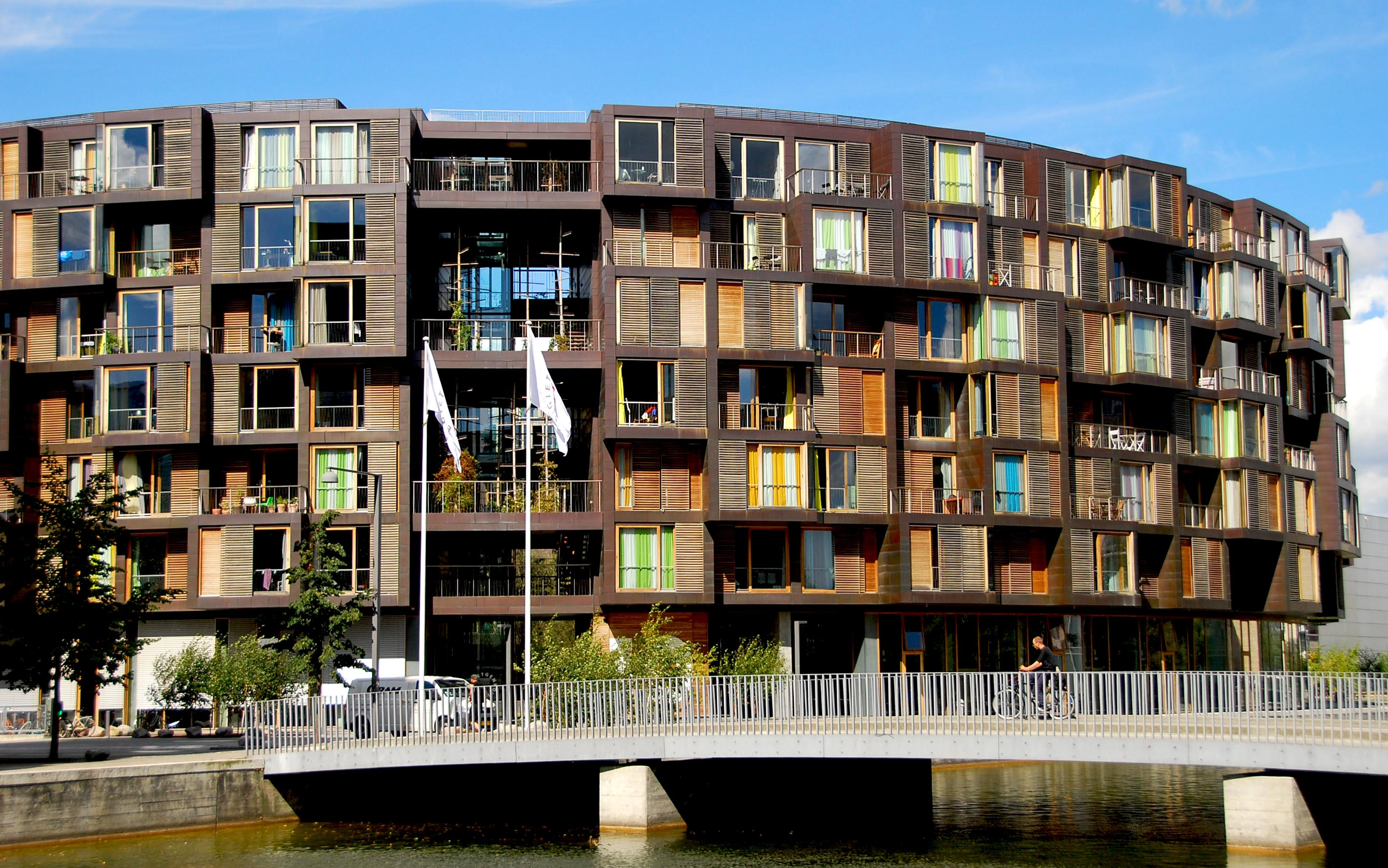

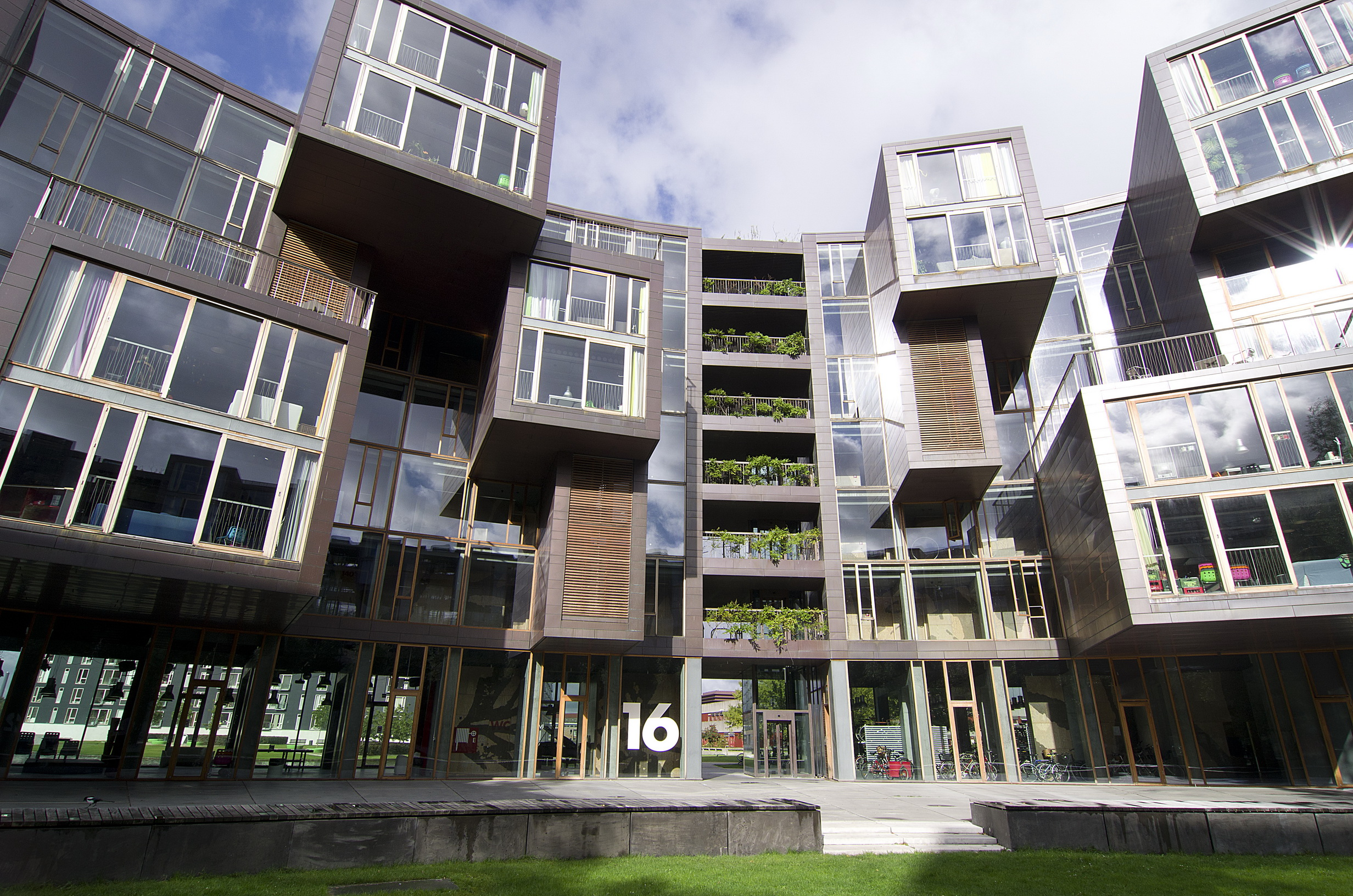

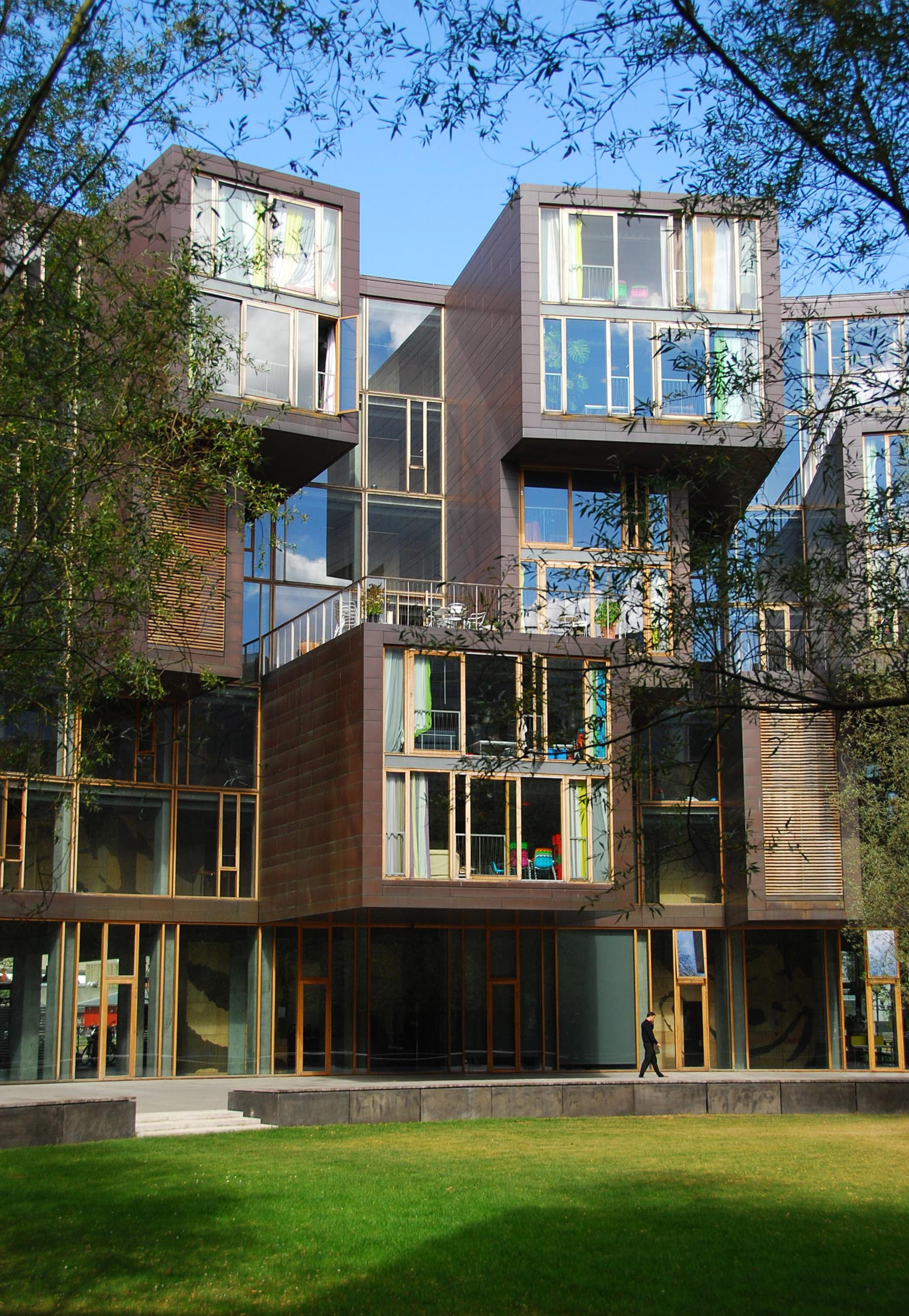

== Literature ==
- Pernille Stensgaard: Tietgenkollegiet; Nyt Nordisk Forlag (2007). ISBN 978-87-17-03967-4 (in Danish).
- Weston, Richard: Tietgen Dormitory - an imaginary journey around a real building; Edition Bløndal (2014). ISBN 9788791567247.
