= Royal Danish Playhouse =

Theatre in Copenhagen

Royal Playhouse
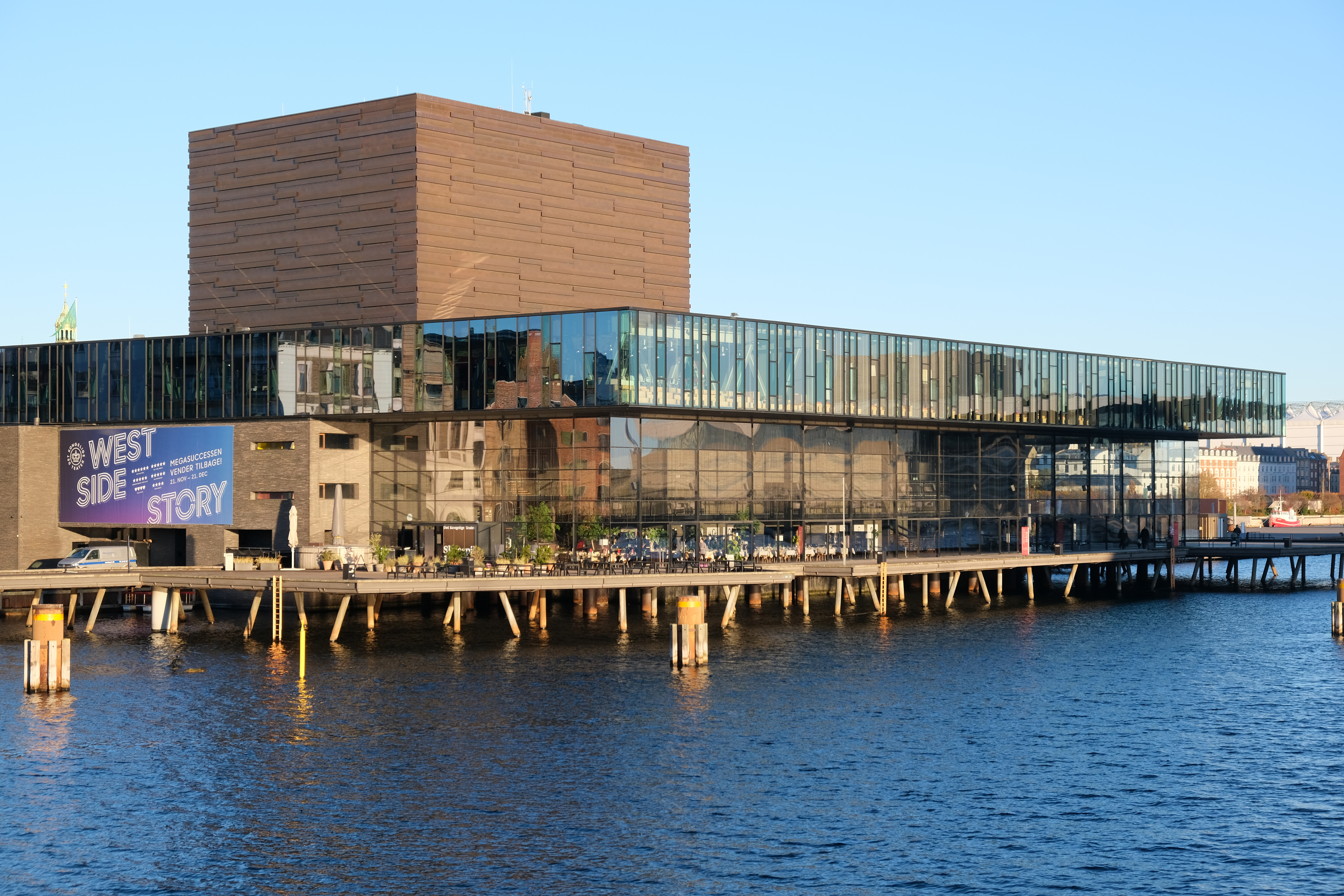
- The Royal Playhouse seen from the harbour

- Location within Copenhagen
- Address: Frederiksstaden; Copenhagen; Denmark
- Coordinates: 55.6801°N 12.5946°E
- Capacity: 650 seats, 250 seats, and 100 seats
- Type: National theatre
- Production: Repertory

Construction
- Opened: 2008
- Architect: Lundgaard & Tranberg

Website
- www.skuespilhus.dk

The Royal Danish Playhouse (Danish: Skuespilhuset) is a theatre building for the Royal Danish Theatre in central Copenhagen, Denmark. It is situated on the waterfront of the Inner Harbour in the Frederiksstaden neighbourhood. It was created as a purpose-built venue for dramatic theatre, supplementing the theatre's old venue from 1874 on Kongens Nytorv and the 2004 Copenhagen Opera House, which are used for ballet and opera.

The Royal Playhouse is designed by the Danish architectural practice Lundgaard & Tranberg.

== History ==
Since the 1880s Copenhagen city started the discussion of building a new Royal Playhouse for the latest trend in acting, where focus was on the more natural and intimate drama speaking works as opposed to the popular recital theater of the time.

== Building ==
The theatre is designed by the Danish architectural practice Lundgaard & Tranberg. It is built in a long, slim, deep-brown brick that was specially developed for the project. The exterior is dominated by a continuous glass-encased top story with offices and back-stage facilities for the actors. Above the glass band is the dark copper-clad cube of the stage tower.

The glazed foyer facing the water runs along the entire length of the building. It gives panoramic views of the harbour and contains a restaurant and a cafë. With about 40 per cent of the building projecting over the water, the waterfront promenade pivots around the playhouse, diverting pedestrians onto a raised 150 metre long walkway layered with rustic oak planks placed on Venetian-style crooked columns creating a floating feel.

The building received a RIBA European Award in 2008 for its architecture as well as a Red dot design award for the design of the chairs.

== See also ==
- Architecture of Denmark
