= Pheasant (disambiguation) =

Pheasant is a bird of one of several genera within the subfamily Phasianinae, family Phasianidae, order Galliformes.

Pheasant may also refer to:

== People with the surname ==
- Steven Pheasant (born 1951), English cricketer
- Thomas Pheasant (born 1955), American interior designer

== Places ==
- Pheasant Branch, Wisconsin, a conservancy area in the United States
- Pheasant Creek, a creek in Canada
- Pheasant Creek, Queensland, a locality in Australia
- Pheasant Creek, Victoria, a rural area in Australia
- Pheasant Island, an island between France and Spain
- Pheasant Island (Eutin), an island in Germany

== Transport and military uses ==
- HMS Pheasant, several ships of the Royal Navy
- Operation Pheasant, military operation in Netherlands in World War II
- Pheasant Aircraft Company, American aircraft manufacturer

- Pheasant H-10, 1928 biplane

== Other uses ==
- Common pheasant (Phasianus colchicus) a species of large bird
- Pheasant Inn, Bassenthwaite, a public house in Cumbria, England

== See also ==
- The Pheasantry, a listed building in London
- Pheasants Nest, New South Wales, a town in Australia
