= Arne Vodder =

Danish furniture designer (1926–2009)

Arne Vodder (16 February 1926 – 27 December 2009) was a Danish furniture designer, a close friend and partner of Finn Juhl who had been his teacher.

== Biography ==
Arne Vodder was trained by Finn Juhl, who became his friend and business partner. Before concentrating on furniture alone, in 1951 he opened his own studio with the architect Anton Borg. Together they designed some 1,100 low-cost houses which proved to be a great success. In the 1950s and 1960s, at a time when Denmark was receiving international recognition for its furniture, he designed a wide range of items. Despite the originality and timelessness of his style, he is not as well known as contemporaries such as Børge Mogensen and Arne Jacobsen. Yet his works are simple and modest, crafted in natural materials such as rosewood and teak and, in particular, are free of sharp edges.

One of his more notable pieces is a rosewood sideboard with drawers shaped to avoid the need for handles. The timeless design of the piece combines exotic wood with coloured panels. Another classic is his chaise longue in teak and beech covered in wickered patent leather and produced by Bovirke. Other pieces include tables, desks, sofas and hall furniture, inspired by nature with soft, organic, elegantly curved lines.

From the 1950s, Vodder worked with the furniture company Sibast on several sets of office furniture which did particularly well on the American market, even arousing the interest of Jimmy Carter. In the 1960s, the furniture not only reached the White House but could be seen in banks, airline offices, embassies and hotels across the globe. Vodder also arranged international exhibitions in Sweden, England, Austria and the United States together with Verner Panton and Nanna Ditzel. Vodder worked with a number of manufacturers including Poul Cadovius, Nielaus, Erik Jorgensen, Fritz Hansen, Sibast furniture and latterly Nielaus and Kircodan in Bangkok.

== See also ==
- Official Website: https://arnevodder.com/
- Danish modern
- Danish design
