= Jørgen Kastholm =

Danish furniture designer (1931–2007)

Jørgen Kastholm (1931–2007) was a Danish furniture designer, interior designer, and professor. He collaborated extensively with Preben Fabricius between 1961 and 1968.

Furniture designed by Kastholm has appeared in several films and series, including: The Girl and the Millionaire, Captain Scarlet and the Mysterons, Rollerball, Who Am I?, The Devil Wears Prada, Old Dogs, The International, Up in the Air, The Ghost Writer, Fair Game, X Factor, and A Most Wanted Man. His furniture has now become part of permanent exhibitions at a number of museums, including: the Museum of Modern Art, Museo de Arte Moderno, Ringling Museum, Haus Industrieform, and Museum Kunstpalast.

== Early life and education ==
Kastholm was born in Roskilde and attended Kostskole until 1946, then studied abroad in the United States until 1950. Between 1953 and 1955 he completed his military service in the Royal Life Guards.

Kastholm first trained as a smith but soon turned to furniture design. He attended the School for Interior Design (Danish: Skolen For Boligindretning) in Copenhagen where he studied under Finn Juhl. After graduating from the School for Interior design in 1958, he attended Den Grafiske Højskole, a graphic arts folk high school, until 1959.

== Career ==
It was while studying at the Design School that Kastholm met cabinetmaker Preben Fabricius who became his partner for a number of years. They had a common approach to furniture design, never wanting to compromise on quality. Speaking of their partnership, Kastholm commented: "We had the same basic approach, we both wanted to minimize. I had been to the United States and seen furniture by Eames and Mies van der Rohe and it inspired us. The simplest lasts longest. At school we had learnt that timelessness was an ideal."

In 1961, the pair set up a design studio in a Gentofte cellar without any firm arrangements with manufacturers. In 1965, they exhibited at the furniture fair in Fredericia where the German furniture manufacturer Alfred Kill noticed their work. Kill had a reputation for high quality but initially Fabricius and Kastholm were not keen to design furniture for factory production. Only when Kill offered them 2,500 DM a month each, with no preconditions, did they agree to work for him. They travelled to Stuttgart with their first designs for production in Kill's factory in nearby Fellbach. Their international breakthrough came at the Cologne Fair in 1966 when they exhibited a whole series of office and home furniture leading to orders from ten large furniture concerns. Their minimalistic designs, both attractive and comfortable, were usually in steel and leather. The Tulip Chair FK 6725, the Grasshopper Chair FK 87, and the Scimitar Chair are among their most successful works. The Tulip Chair FK 6725 has become famous as Meryl Streep's office chair in the film The Devil Wears Prada.

The pieces of furniture they produced during their seven-year period of cooperation from 1961 to 1968 were so distinctive that many are still produced today as classics. During his partnership with Fabricius, their work was exhibited at a number of notable institutions, including the Stedelijk Museum Amsterdam, Museum of Modern Art, and the Ringling Museum of Art. As a result of disagreements, the pair decided to terminate their cooperation in 1968.

In 1974, Kastholm successfully applied for a patent for his Tiltable swivel chair: United States Patent. 3,814,369.

Kastholm moved to Düsseldorf, Germany in 1971, where he remained based for the remainder of his career. That same year, he became a member of the German Architect Chamber and German Werkbund. He was later appointed professor at Bergische Universität in Wuppertal near Düsseldorf where he taught design from 1975 to 1996. He also designed furniture at his office in Germany as well as in his house in the mountains on the island of Majorca. He returned to Denmark shortly before he died in June 2007.

== Awards ==
Kastholm was the recipient of a variety of awards for his work. Among the most notable are:

- Ringling Museum Award (1969)
- Ersten Bundespreis "Gute Form" (1969)
- Giid Industrial Form (1972, 1974, 1976)
- Stuttgart Design Center Prize (1972, 1977)
- Grand Prix of the Museum of Modern Art, Rio de Janeiro (1973)
- Red Dot (2005)

== See also ==
- Danish modern
- Danish design
