= TV-Byen =

Coordinates: 55.7262°N 12.4763°E

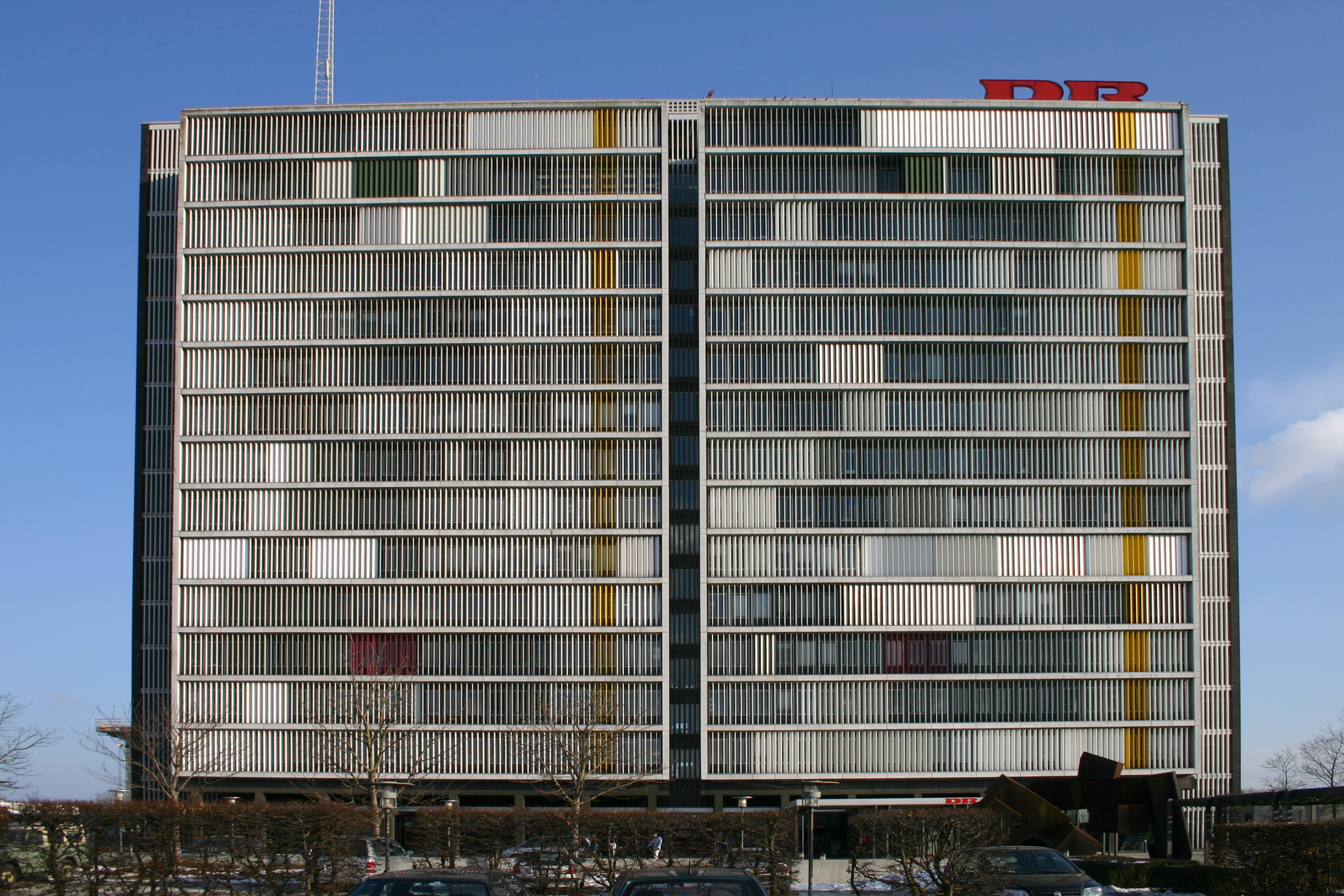
The TV-Byen office tower

TV-Byen is the former headquarters of national Danish broadcaster DR, located in Gladsaxe, approximately 9 kilometres northwest of central Copenhagen, Denmark. The 207,000 m2 site has been redeveloped with a mixture of offices, housing and retail after DR inaugurated their new headquarters, DR Byen in 2007.

== History ==
The Radio House (Radiohuset) in Frederiksberg was completed as a new home for DR in 1945. The building was designed by Vilhelm Lauritzen. In the 1950s, with the increasing role of the television media, the building became too small. A design competition for a new headquarters in Gladsaxe, northwest of Copenhagen, was won by Vilhelm Lauritzen's studio. Their winning proposal was designed by Mogens Boertmann.

The first phase of the project was inaugurated by Frederik IX in 1966. The second phase, which included the 14-story office tower, was inaugurated in 1970. The last phase, which included the News Building, was completed a few years later. The TV-Byen was home to DR's administration, television and film studios, costume department, workshops and with space for other activities. Most of DR's radio broadcasting as well as the DR Concert Hall remained in the Radio Building. DR's television evening news programme, TV Avisen, was also broadcast from the Radio House until 7 October 1983.

In 2006 and 2007, DR left TV-Byen, concentrating their activities in their new headquarters, DR Byen, in Ørestad, Copenhagen.

== Redevelopment ==
In 2000, the real estate developers Sjælsø Gruppen and Ejendomsselskabet St. Frederikslund purchased TV-Byen and Radiohuset from DR for DKK 780 million.

The site in Gladsaxe covered an area of 207,000 m2 and comprised 30 buildings with a floor area of 100,000 m2. The local plan for TV-Byen was adopted in 2005. In 2009, Ernst & Young moved into the office tower.

== External sources ==
- concerts at TV-Byen
