= Mark Upton (cricketer) =

English cricketer

Personal information
- Full name: Mark Upton
- Born: 30 June 1950 (age 76); Poole, Dorset, England
- Batting: Right-handed
- Bowling: Slow left-arm orthodox

Domestic team information
- Years: Team
- 1971: Sussex

Career statistics
Competition	First-class
Matches	1
Runs scored	2
Batting average	–
100s/50s	–/–
Top score	2*
Balls bowled	180
Wickets	1
Bowling average	120.00
5 wickets in innings	–
10 wickets in match	–
Best bowling	1/72
Catches/stumpings	–/–
- Source: Cricinfo, 27 November 2011

Mark Upton (born 30 June 1950) is a former English cricketer. Upton was a right-handed batsman who bowled slow left-arm orthodox. He was born at Poole, Dorset.

Upton made a single first-class appearance for Sussex against Cambridge University in 1971. He scored two runs in this match, as well as taking the wicket of Michael Barford, though this came at an overall cost of 120 runs. Along with fellow debutant Steven Pheasant, this was his only major appearance for Sussex.
