= Radiohuset =

Former headquarters of national Danish broadcaster DR

Radio House
- Radiohuset
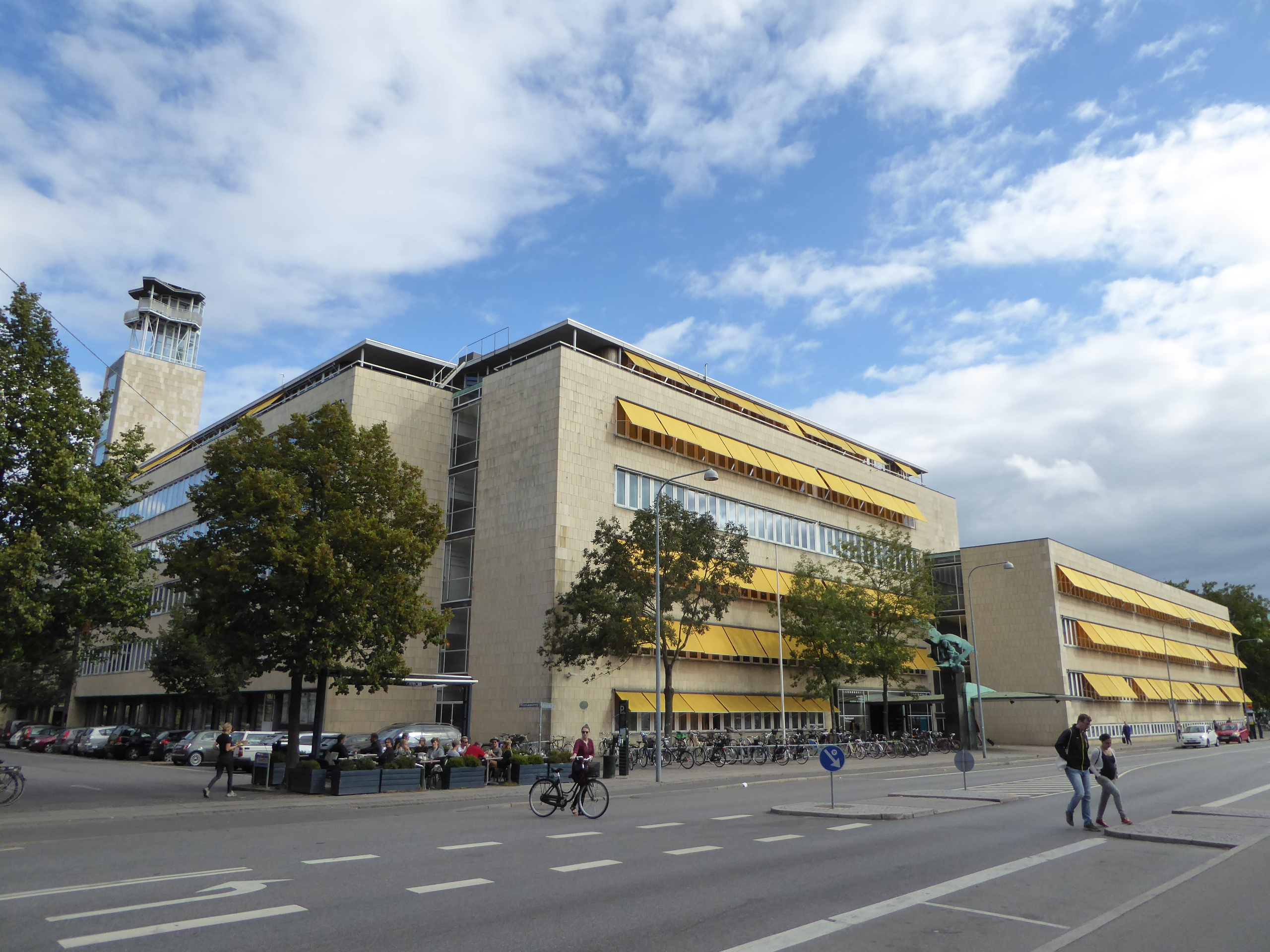
- Radiohuset seen from Rosenørns Allé
- Interactive map of the Radio House area

General information
- Architectural style: Functionalism
- Location: Copenhagen, Denmark, Denmark
- Coordinates: 55°40′56″N 12°33′11″E
- Current tenants: Royal Danish Academy of Music
- Construction started: 1938
- Completed: 1945
- Client: DR

Design and construction
- Architect: Vilhelm Lauritzen

Radiohuset (literally "The Radio House") is the former headquarters of national Danish broadcaster DR, located on Rosenørns Allé in Frederiksberg, Copenhagen. The building complex was inaugurated in 1945 to a Functionalist design by Vilhelm Lauritzen and later expanded in 1958 and 1972. Vacated by DR when DR Byen was inaugurated in 2006, the buildings now house the Royal Danish Academy of Music as well as the Museum of Music. The complex also contains a concert hall. The building was listed in 1994.

== History ==
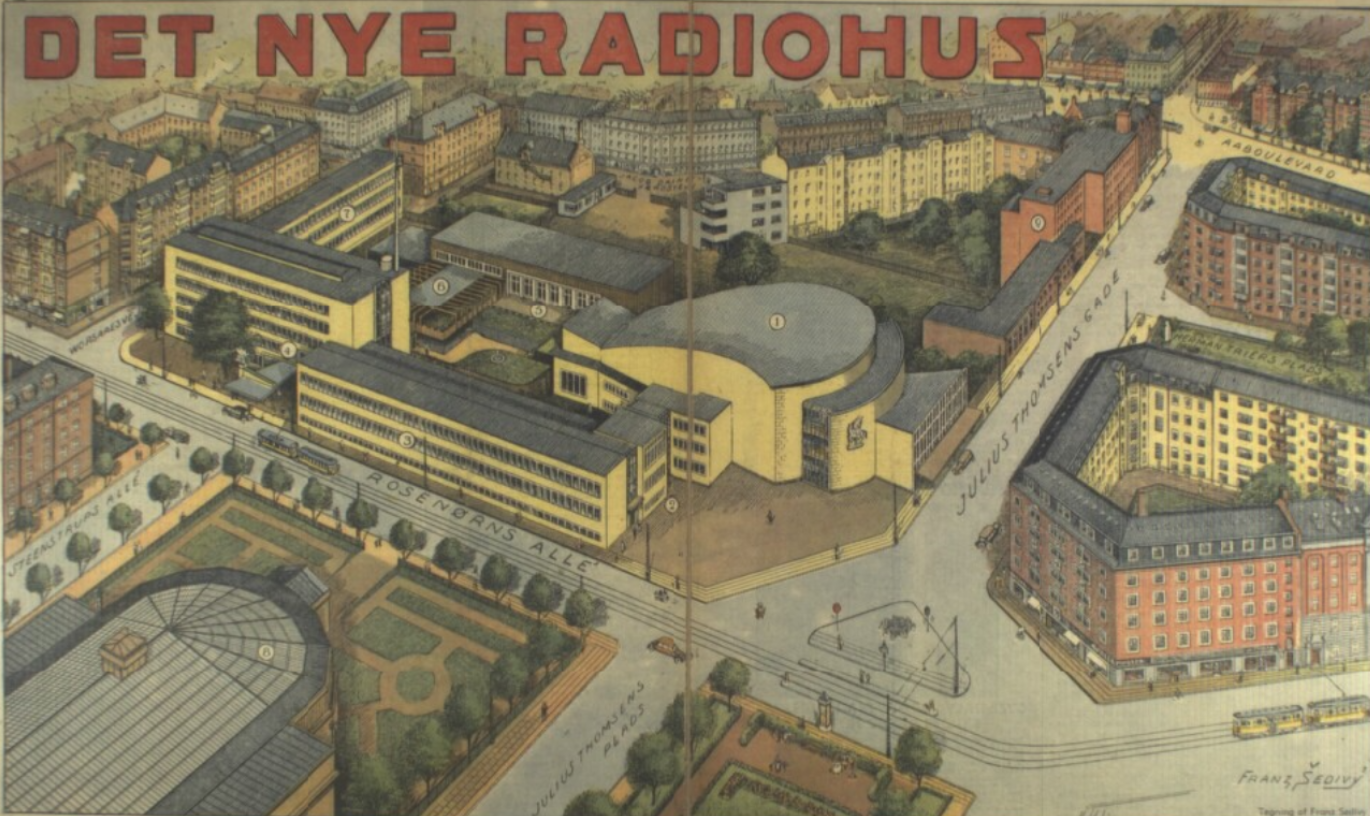
Franz Šedivý: The New Radio House, 1930s

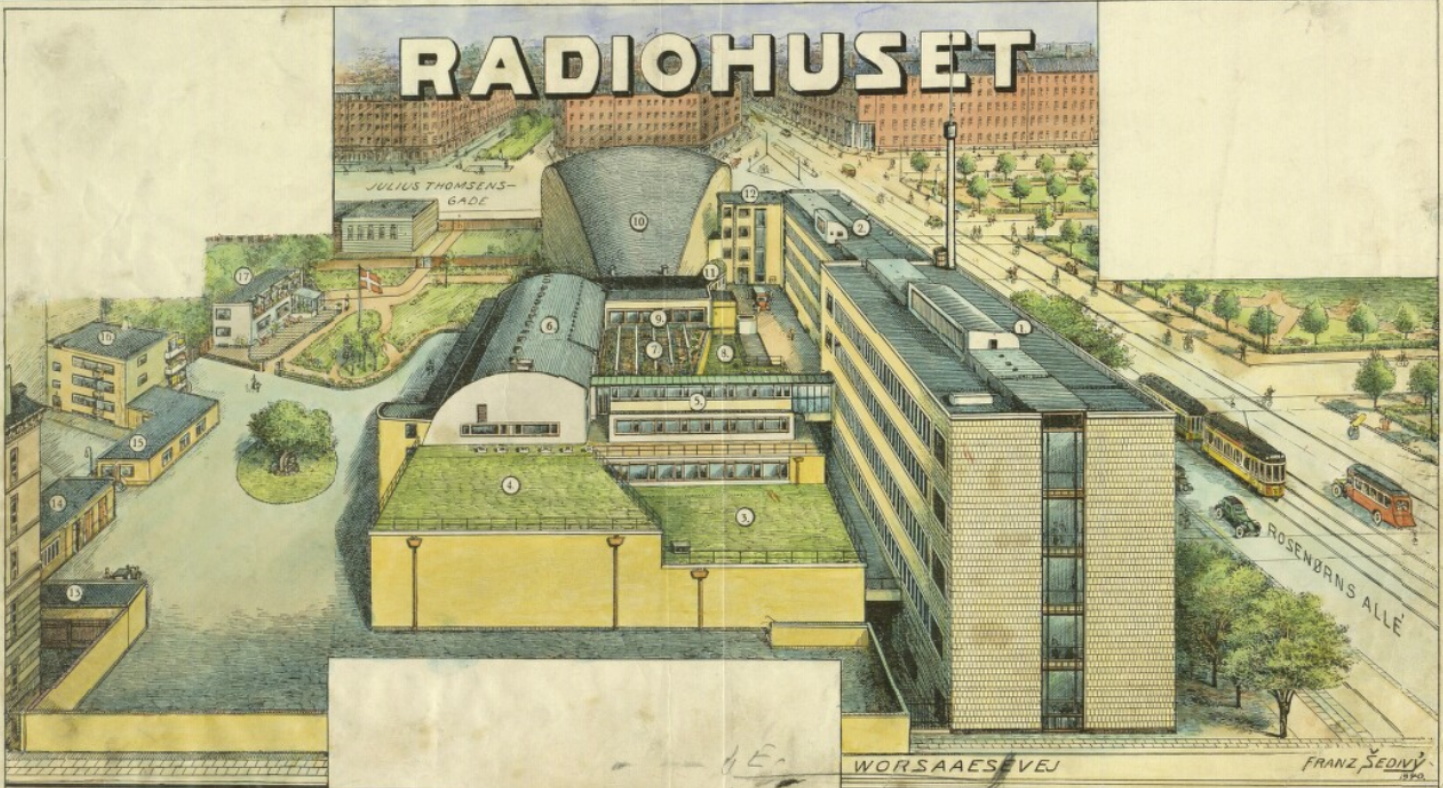
Franz Šedivý: The Radio House, 1940

During the first years of its existence, Danish Broadcasting Corporation (Danish Statsradiofonien) was based at various locations in Copenhagen, including in Stærekassen on Kongens Nytorv and in Axelborg on Vesterbrogade. As the organization grew, the need for a larger, purpose-built home became evident. Vilhelm Lauritzen was one of four members of a building committee which in the summer of 1934 went on a study trip to London, Paris, Brussels, Geneva, Zürich, Prague, Leipzig, Berlin and Konigsberg, visiting similar broadcasting houses, and later that year Lauritzen published a preliminary design proposal for a broadcasting house in Arkitekten.

The building went under construction in 1938 and was mostly ready in January 1941, although the concert hall was not completed until 1945. The complex was expanded with a new wing for DR's Television operations. In 1964, as they required still more space, they moved to the new TV-Byen complex in Gladsaxe, leaving only the radio broadcasting activities and corporate management in Radiohuset which saw another expansion in 1972. Television news, under the TV Avisen banner, remained at Radiohuset before it moved to TV-Byen in October 1983.

In 2001, Radiohuset was sold to the Royal Danish Academy of Music which let it to DR until DR-byen was completed in 2006.

== Architecture ==
The original complex consisted of four elements: A main wing, also known as Høj Fløj (literally "High Wing") with the main entrance on Rosenørns Allé, a lower wing on its right-hand side (Lav Fløj, literally "Low Wing"), Studieblokken (literally "The Studio Block") to its rear and the trapezoid concert hall on Julius Thonsens Gade. The extension in 1958 added a new wing (Ny Fløj, literally "New Wing") to the rear of the main wing, on Worsaaesvej, and the 1972 expansion integrated a former residential building on Worsaaesvej in the complex and added an extra floor on.

Lauritzen collaborated with Finn Juhl on furniture, lamps and other fittings and Gudmund Nyeland Brandt designed the roof garden on the Studio Block.

== Royal Danish Music Academy ==
An architectural competition for the adaption of the building for use by the Royal Danish Academy of Music was won by Vilhelm Lauritzen Architects, The Royal Music Academy inaugurated their new home on 1 September 2008.

== Concert hall ==
The concert hall seats 1200 people. It contains a pipe organ with 84 voices and 114 ranks, built by Marcussen in 1946.
