= Preben Fabricius =

Danish furniture designer (1931–1984)

Preben Juul Fabricius (1931–1984) was a Danish furniture designer who worked together with Jørgen Kastholm. During the 1960s, the pair designed a wide range of pieces for the German Alfred Kill who had a furniture factory in Fellbach near Stuttgart.

== Biography ==
Fabricius was trained as a cabinetmaker by Niels Vodder before attending the School for Interior Design where he studied under Finn Juhl. It was there that he met the blacksmith Jørgen Kastholm. They had a common approach to furniture design, never wanting to compromise on aesthetics. In 1961, the pair set up a design studio in a Gentofte cellar without any firm arrangements with manufacturers. In 1965, they exhibited at the furniture fair in Fredericia where the German furniture manufacturer Alfred Kill noticed their work. Kill had a reputation for high quality but initially Favricius and Kastholm were not keen to design furniture for factory production. Only when Kill offered them DM 2,500 a month each, with no preconditions, did they agree to work for him. They travelled to Stuttgart with their first designs for production in Kill's factory in nearby Fellbach. Their international breakthrough came at the Cologne Fair in 1966 when they exhibited a whole series of office and home furniture leading to orders from ten large furniture concerns. Their minimalistic designs, both attractive and comfortable, were usually in steel and leather. The Tulip Chair, the Grasshopper Chair and the Scimitar Chair are among their most successful works.

The pieces of furniture they produced during their seven-year period of cooperation from 1961 to 1968 were so distinctive that many are still produced today as classics. As a result of disagreements, the pair decided to terminate their cooperation in 1968.

Fabricius and Kastholm was awarded the Illum Prize (1968) and the first German Gute Form prize for their FK Tulip chair (1969).

Fabricius died in March 1984 when he was only 52.

== See also ==
- Danish modern
- Danish design
