= Thomas Pheasant =

American interior designer (born 1955)

Thomas Pheasant (born 1955) is an American interior designer based in Washington, D.C. He founded Thomas Pheasant Studios and has collaborated with furniture brands like Baker and McGuire Furniture.

== Early life and education ==
Thomas Pheasant was born in Washington, D.C. in 1955, and raised in Adelphi, Maryland. He attended the University of Maryland, where he initially studied architecture before switching to interior design. During his studies, Pheasant gained early professional experience working as an assistant to designer Victor Shagari for four years.

== Career ==
Pheasant was named "Dean of American Design" by Architectural Digest (US edition) in 2005 and received an award from Andrew Martin International. He was reportedly the first American designer to exhibit at the Pavilion des Antiquaires et des Beaux Arts in Paris. In 2012, Pheasant was hired by the Blair House Restoration Fund to refresh the interior and design portions of the Blair House, the official guest residence of the United States President.

In 2013, Pheasant founded Thomas Pheasant Studios in Washington, D.C., which produces limited-edition furniture. He has undertaken residential and commercial projects in the United States, Europe, and Asia, including work for the Hay-Adams Hotel and projects for BET co-founder Sheila Johnson. He was commissioned to decorate and design parts of the Blair House, the guest house for the White House. Thomas Pheasant has also worked on Georgetown's Rosewood Hotel, designing the interiors of six townhouses associated with the property. After the two decades of searching for inspiration in Europe and other parts of the words, he finally finds one in Japan.

=== Collections ===
==== Baker ====
Pheasant launched a furniture collection with Baker Furniture in 2002, titled The Thomas Pheasant Collection. The collection incorporates neoclassical influences.

==== McGuire Furniture ====
Pheasant has collaborated with McGuire Furniture on two collections: The Thomas Pheasant Collection, featuring indoor furniture using materials including rattan, leather, bronze, glass, and stone, and The Thomas Pheasant Outdoor Collection for outdoor use.

== Style ==
Pheasant's design style has been described as applying a "contemporary dimension to classical design." He has stated that his style is inspired by traditional architecture. Taste of Life Magazine has characterized his design philosophy as "classic minimalism, tradition, and vision with a balanced tranquility.”

== Publications ==
Books featuring work by Thomas Pheasant include:

- Mirror by Design: Using Reflection to Transform (1996)
- Showcase of Interior Design (1997)
- Eclectic Style in Interior Design (1998)
- American Designers' Houses (2004)
- Spectacular Homes of Greater Washington (2006)
- House Beautiful Colors for Your Home (2008)
- Regency Redux (2008)
- Robert A.M. Stern, Buildings & Projects 2004-2009 (2009)
- Simply Serene (2013) - With Victoria Sant, published by Rizzoli International Publications
- Decorating with Carpets: The Stark Tradition (2015)
- Jonas: The Art of Fine Upholstery (2015)
- Interior Design Master Class (2016)

== Awards and recognition ==
Pheasant received the Design Icon Award at the Las Vegas Market in 2016, and the Andrew Martin International Designer of the Year Award in 1997.
