= Pheasant H-10 =

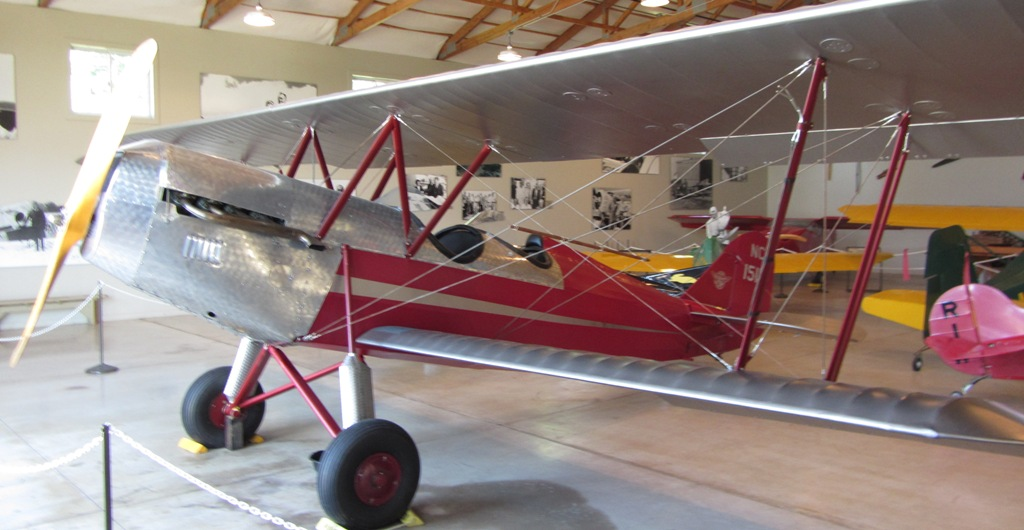
- Pheasant H-10 on display

General information
- Type: Biplane
- National origin: United States of America
- Manufacturer: The Pheasant Aircraft Company
- Designer: Orville Hickman
- Number built: 41

History
- Manufactured: 1928-1930
- Introduction date: 1928

The H-10 Pheasant was a tandem-seat conventional landing gear-equipped biplane with fabric covering, built in 1928 by the Pheasant Aircraft Company to compete in the crowded market of barnstorming biplanes. The company dissolved shortly after, during the Great Depression of the early 1930s.

== Development ==
The H-10 was designed by Orville Hickman for Lee R. Biggs, owner of the newly formed Pheasant Aircraft Company in Memphis, Missouri. Eleven units were built before the death of the company founder in a flying accident on December 5, 1927. Race pilot Steve Wittman took over as test pilot. Wittman helped relocate the company to his home in Fond du Lac, Wisconsin when Adolf Bechaud and his associates purchased the company.

== Design ==
The Pheasant H-10 is made from a welded steel tube fuselage with a fabric covering. The aircraft was powered by a 90 hp (67 kW) water cooled Curtiss OX-5 engine. The landing gear was conventionally mounted, with a tail skid.

== Operational history ==
Pheasant test pilot Steve Wittman entered The H-10 was entered into the September 8, 1928 Air Derby from New York to Los Angeles. Dropping out due to radiator trouble in the desert. Wittman finished 12th out of 38 entries. Wittman raced again in the 1928 Air Derby from Los Angeles to Cincinnati and finished in 4th place. He also entered the H-10 in the 1929 National Air Races in Cleveland.

== Surviving aircraft ==
- One example is on static display in Memphis, Missouri. Previously located on Long Island, New York, residents of the Memphis area donated over &75,000 in 2012 to purchase and transport the H-10 back to the city of its manufacture.
- The EAA AirVenture Museum has a H-10 on display that was donated in 1971.

== Specifications ==
Data from EAA Museum

General characteristics

- Capacity: 2
- Length: 23 ft 6 in (7.16 m)
- Wingspan: 32 ft 4 in (9.86 m)
- Height: 9 ft (2.7 m)
- Wing area: 283 sq ft (26.3 m^{2})
- Empty weight: 1,351 lb (613 kg)
- Gross weight: 2,089 lb (948 kg)
- Fuel capacity: 38 US gallons (144 litres)
- Powerplant: 1 × Curtiss OX-5, 503 cubic inch, V-8, liquid-cooled, 90 hp (67 kW)

Performance

- Maximum speed: 87 kn (100 mph, 160 km/h)
- Cruise speed: 74 kn (85 mph, 137 km/h)
- Range: 350 nmi (400 mi, 640 km)
- Service ceiling: 12,500 ft (3,800 m)
