= Noritsugu Oda =

Noritsugu Oda (織田憲嗣, born 1946) is a Japanese author and illustrator from Kōchi Prefecture. He graduated from Osaka University of Arts as a professional illustrator. Until recently he lectured at the Tokai University in Asahikawa, Hokkaidō.

He is thought to have the world's largest private collection of Finn Juhl chairs. He has published several books on chairs and design, among these Danish Chairs, Hans J. Wegner's 100 Chairs and Finn Juhl.
