= Poul Cadovius =

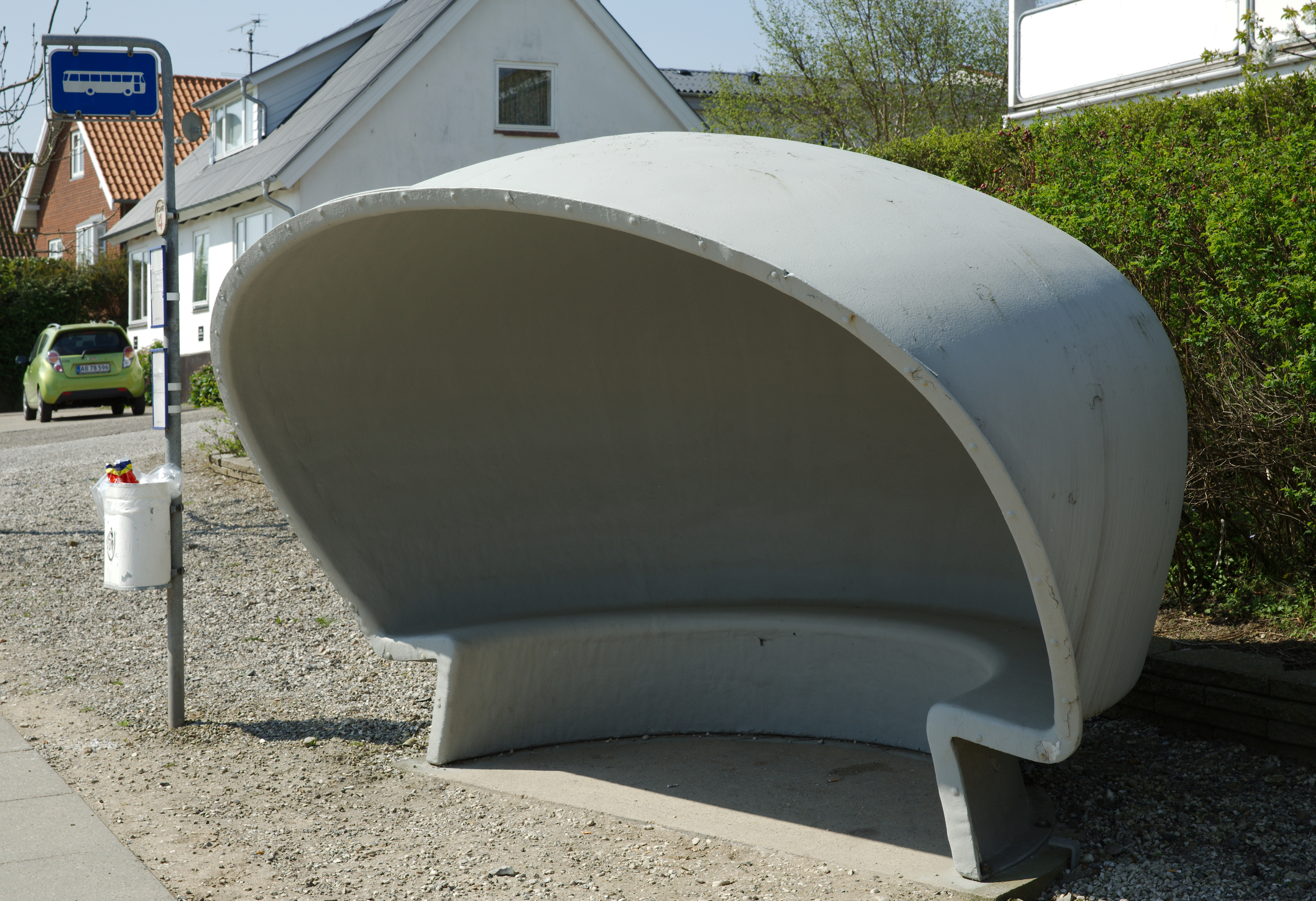
Bus stop shelter designed by Poul Cadovius

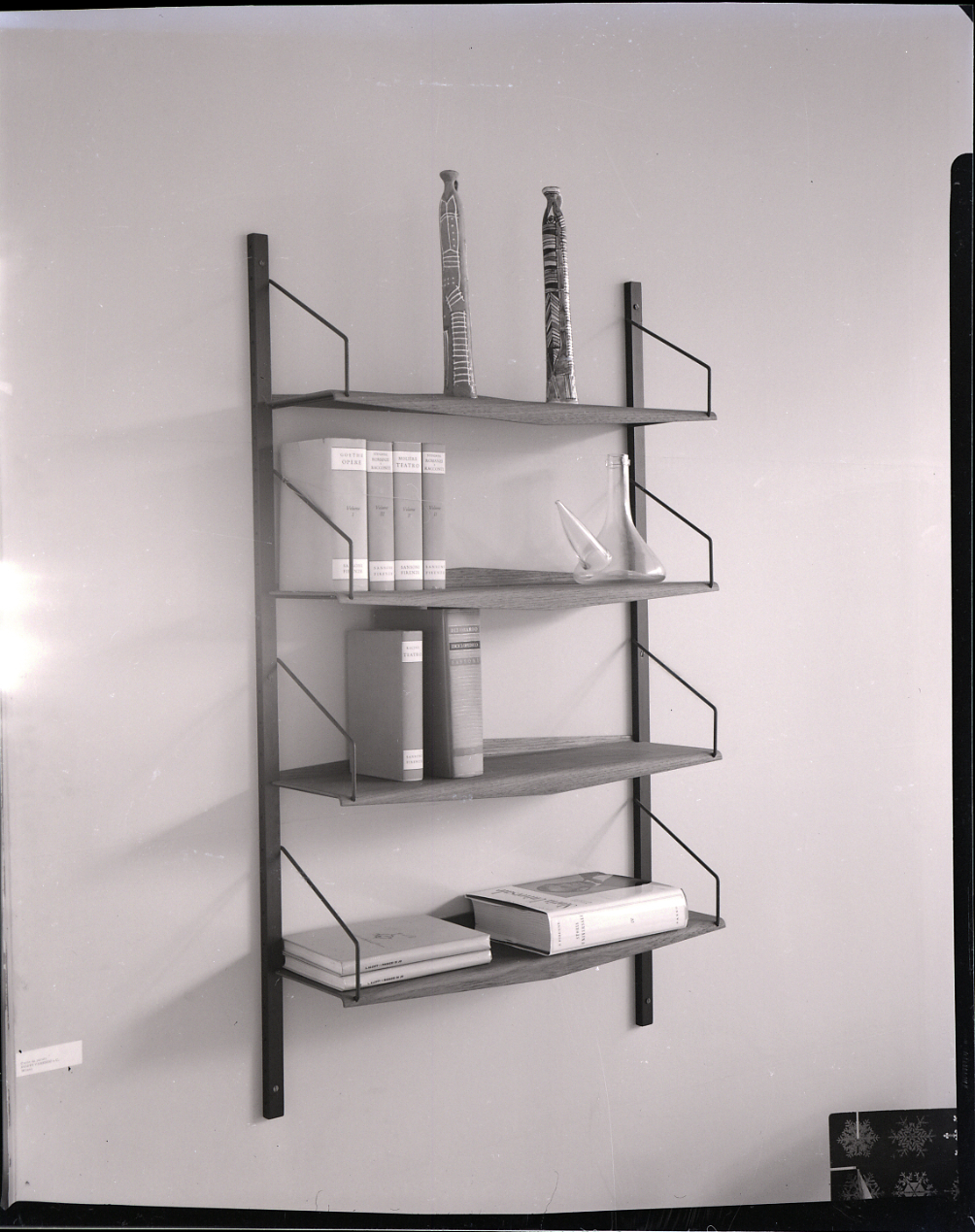
System Ultra DK3 (1957), Poul Cadovius. Silver medal, Milan Triennial 1957.

Poul Cadovius (27 September 1911 - March 2011) was a Danish furniture designer and manufacturer, who held 400 patents.

== Biography ==
Poul Cadovius was born in Frederiksberg, Denmark, in 1911. He was a son of Nikolaj Cadovius (died 1949) and Agnes Jensen (died 1972).

His education included training as a saddler and upholsterer.

He began producing furniture with only six employees. In 1945, he founded the Royal System furniture company, with factories in Denmark and design departments abroad. He designed the Royal System, System Ultra, System Cado, system abstracta and Cadomus. As a designer, he was one of the first to use plastics. He also designed the shell-shaped bus stop shelters.

Poul Cadovius died in 2011.
