= Vilhelm Lauritzen Architects =

Practice information
- Key architects: Søren Daubjerg, Thomas Scheel, Torsten Stephensen, Thomas West Jensen
- Founded: 1922
- Location: Copenhagen

Significant works and honors
- Buildings: DR Byen

Vilhelm Lauritzen Architects (VLA) is an architectural firm based in Copenhagen, Denmark. It was founded by Vilhelm Lauritzen, who headed the firm from its foundation in 1922 until 1969.

== Recent projects ==
=== Completed ===
- Daells Varehus, Copenhagen (1933)
- Radiohuset, Frederiksberg (1936)
- Folkets Hus, Copenhagen (1953 )
- TV-Byen, Gladsaxe (1964)
- Terminal 3, Copenhagen Airport, Copenhagen (1995)
- DR Byen, Ørestad, Copenhagen (2001)
- Waterfront Shopping, Hellerup (2007)
- Stævnen, Ørestad, Copenhagen (2009)
- Fælledklubhuset, Copenhagen (2011)
- Krøyers Plads, Copenhagen (2016)

=== In progress ===
- TV-SYD, Kolding, Denmark
- Niels Bohr Science Park, Copenhagen (competition win 2010)
- Carlsberg, Plot 8, Carlsberg, Copenhagen
- Danish embassy, New Delhi, India (competition win 2011)
- Nissan harbourfront development, Halmstad, Sweden (competition win 2012)
- Residential development, Rostock, Germany (with Wuttke & Ringhof, competition win 2012)
- European School, Carlsberg, Copenhagen, Denmark

== Awards ==
- 2015 MIPIM Award (Residential Development category) for Krøyers Plads
- 2015 MIPIM Award (Future Mega Project category) for North Zealand Hospital

== Gallery ==
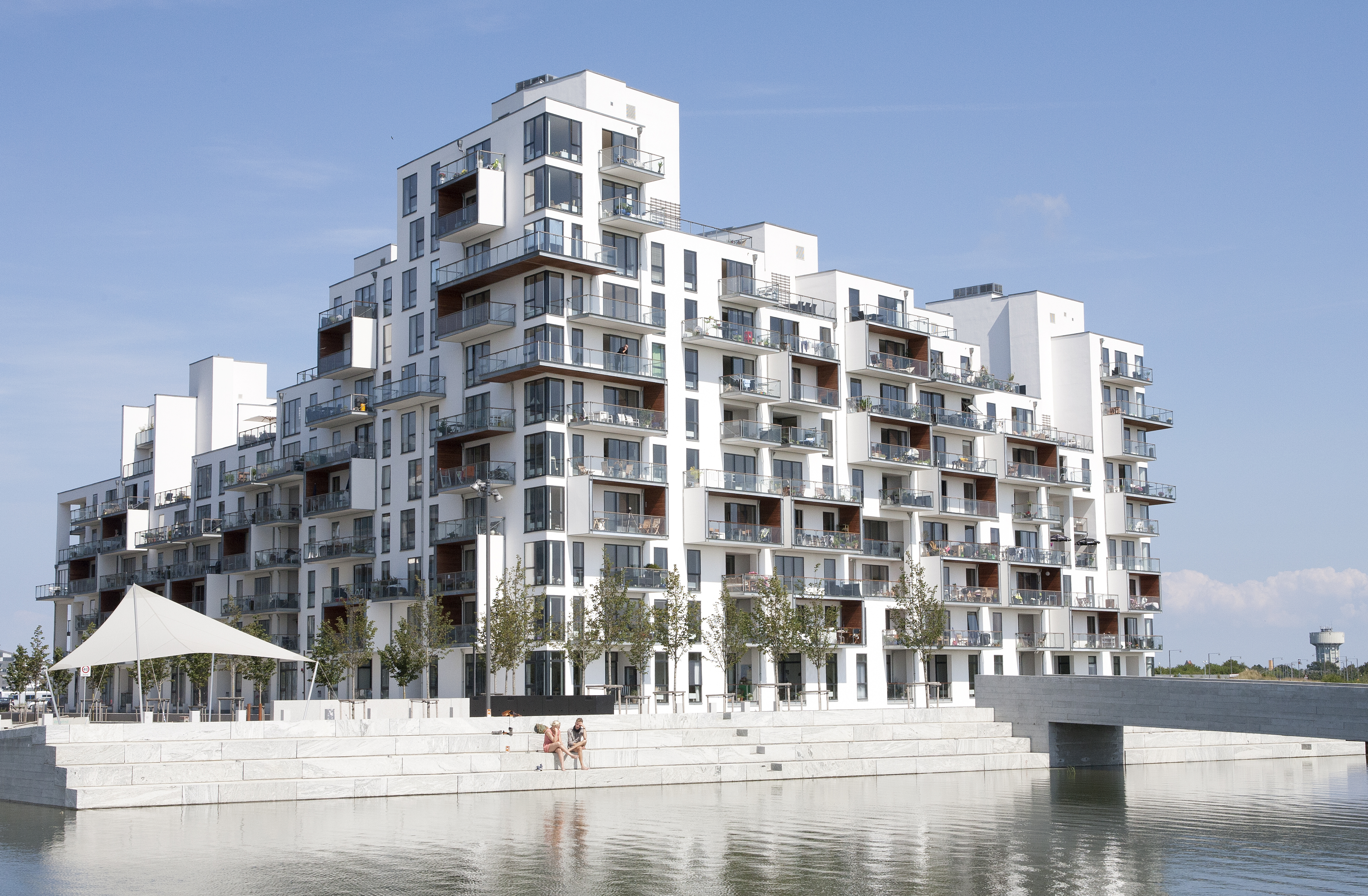
Stævnen in Ørestad, Copenhagen

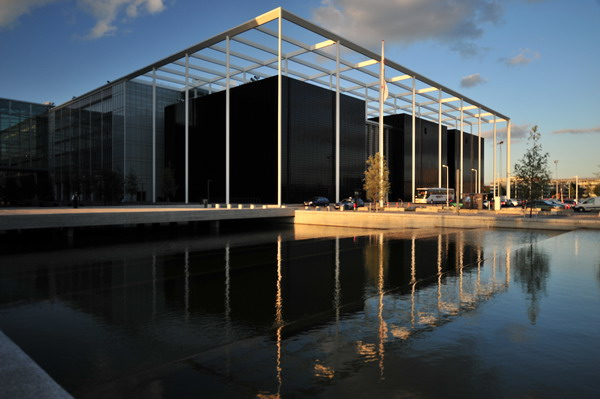
DR Byen, Segment 1

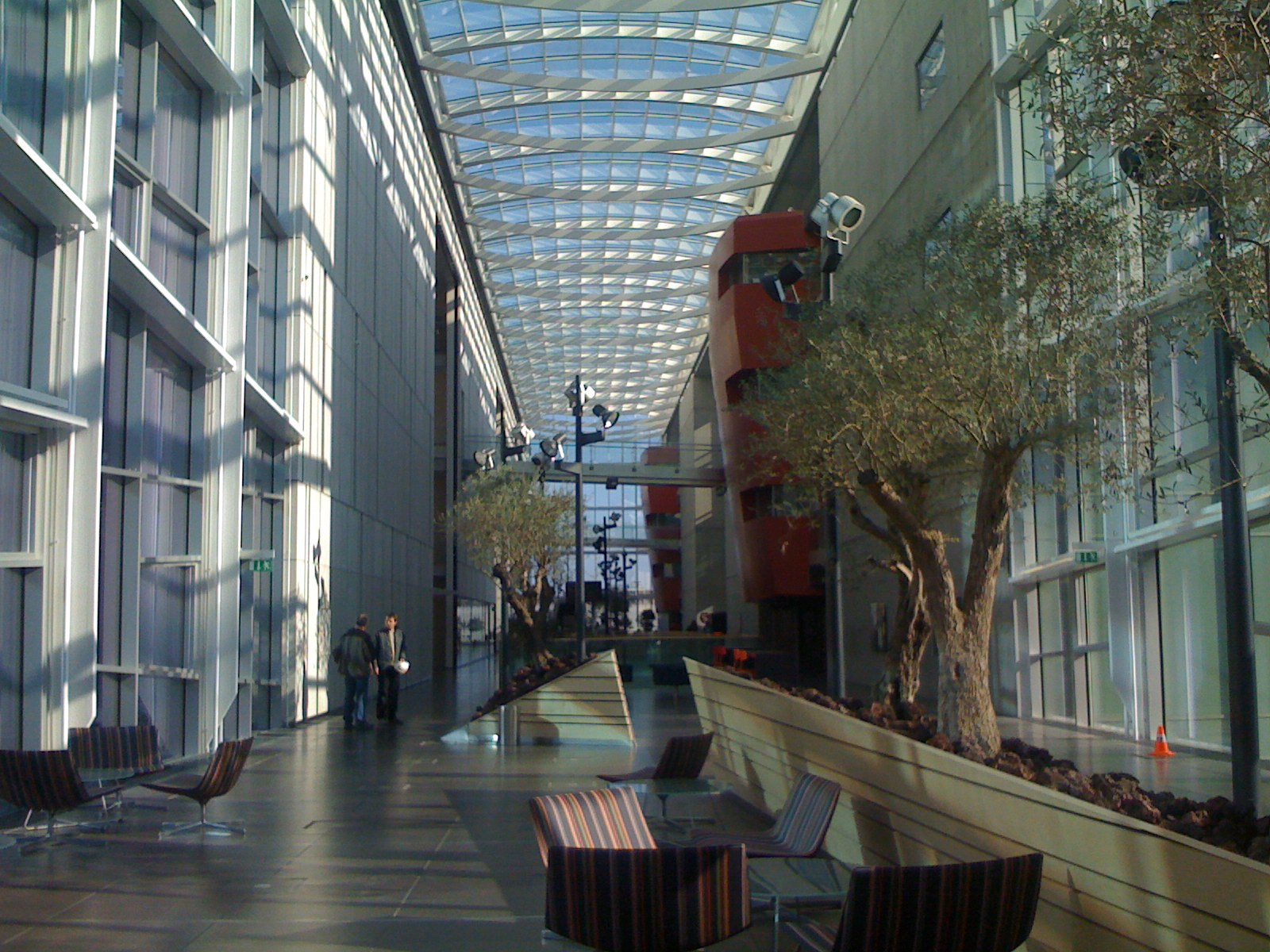
DR Headquarters

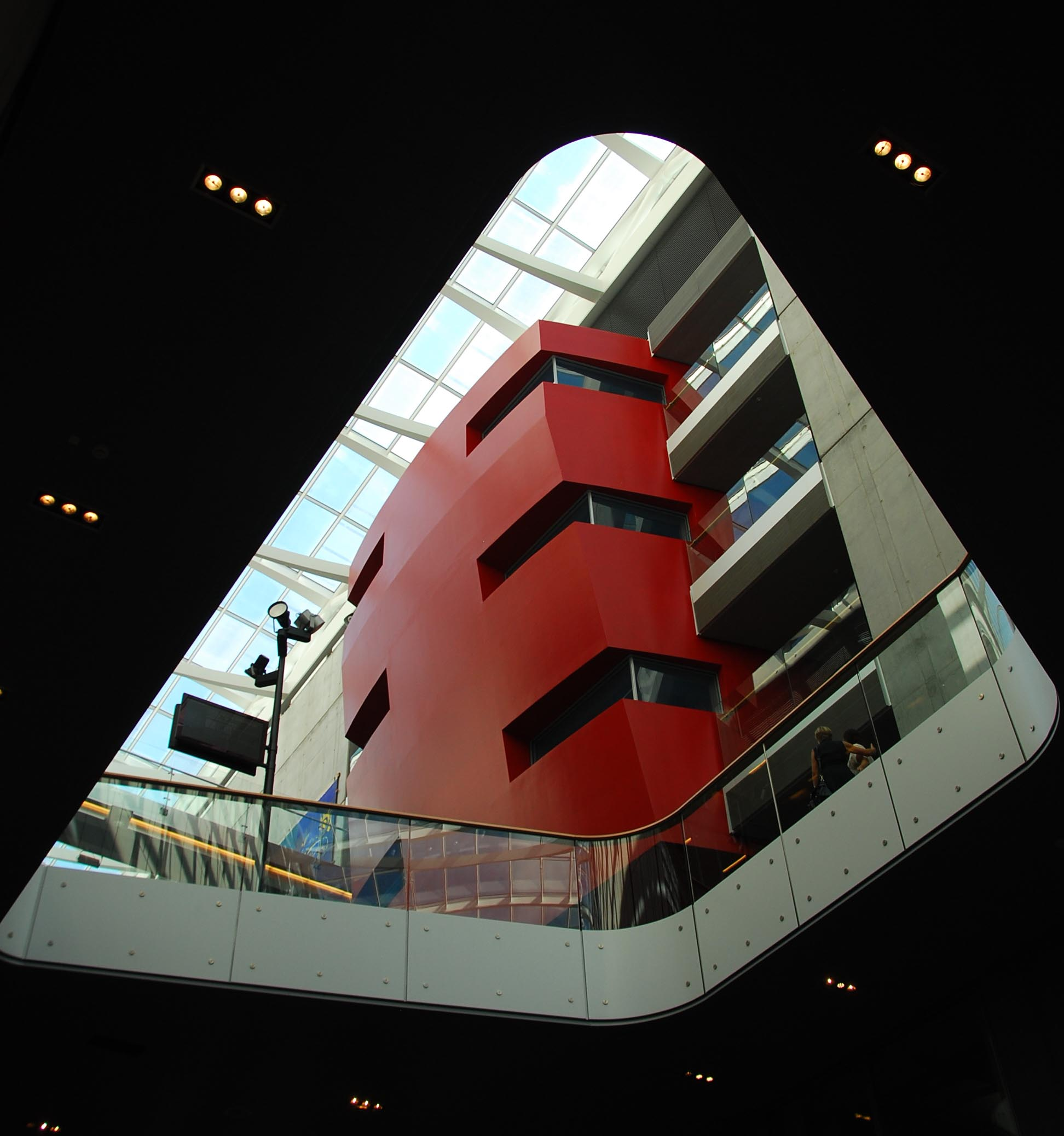
DR Headquarters
