= Steven Pheasant =

English cricketer (born 1951)

Personal information
- Full name: Steven Thomas Pheasant
- Born: 25 June 1951 (age 75); Southwark, London, England
- Batting: Right-handed
- Bowling: Right-arm medium

Domestic team information
- Years: Team
- 1971: Sussex

Career statistics
Competition	First-class
Matches	1
Runs scored	2
Batting average	2.00
100s/50s	0/0
Top score	2*
Balls bowled	300
Wickets	4
Bowling average	30.25
5 wickets in innings	0
10 wickets in match	0
Best bowling	4/88
Catches/stumpings	2/–
- Source: Cricinfo, 27 November 2011

Steven Thomas Pheasant (born 25 June 1951) is an English former cricketer. Pheasant was a right-handed batsman who bowled right-arm medium pace. He was born in Southwark, London.

Pheasant made a single first-class appearance for Sussex against Cambridge University in 1971. He was dismissed for a duck in Sussex's first-innings by Phil Edmonds, while in Cambridge University's first-innings he bowled 23 wicketless overs, though he only conceded 33 runs. In Sussex's second-innings, he ended not out on 2, while in Cambridge University's second-innings he took figures of 4/88 from 27 overs. Despite this, the match ended in a draw. Along with fellow debutant Mark Upton, this was his only major appearance for Sussex.

He played a total of 17 Second XI Championship matches for Sussex between 1968 and 1971.
