= Pheasant Aircraft Company =

The Pheasant Aircraft Company
- Company type: Aircraft manufacturer
- Industry: Aerospace
- Fate: Purchased
- Successor: Dayton Aero & Engineering Company
- Headquarters: Memphis, Missouri, Fond du Lac, Wisconsin
- Key people: Steve Wittman

The Pheasant Aircraft Company was an American aircraft manufacturer.

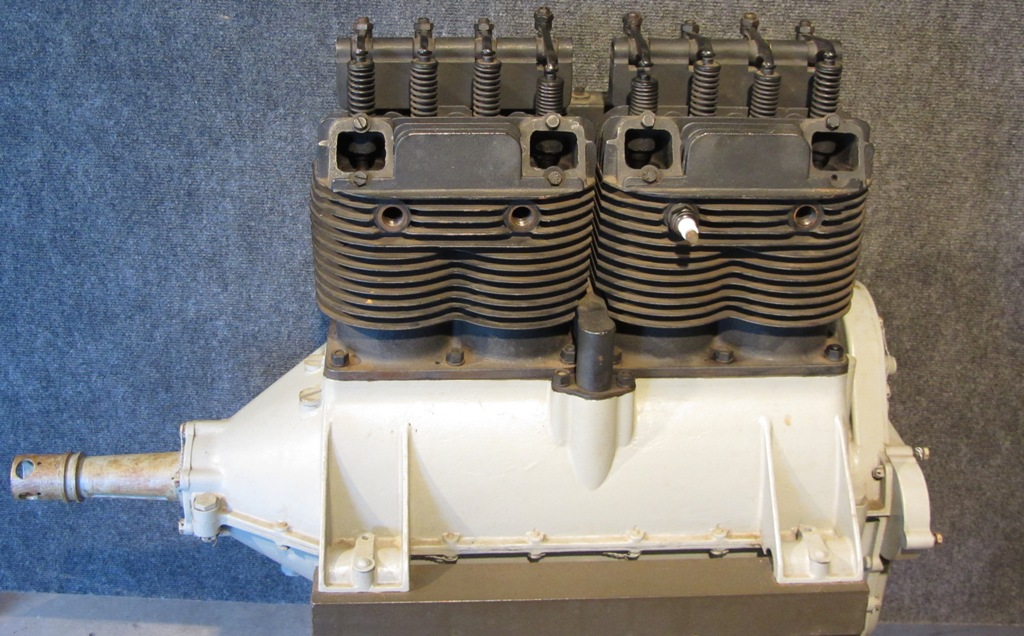
A Pheasant Flight Engine

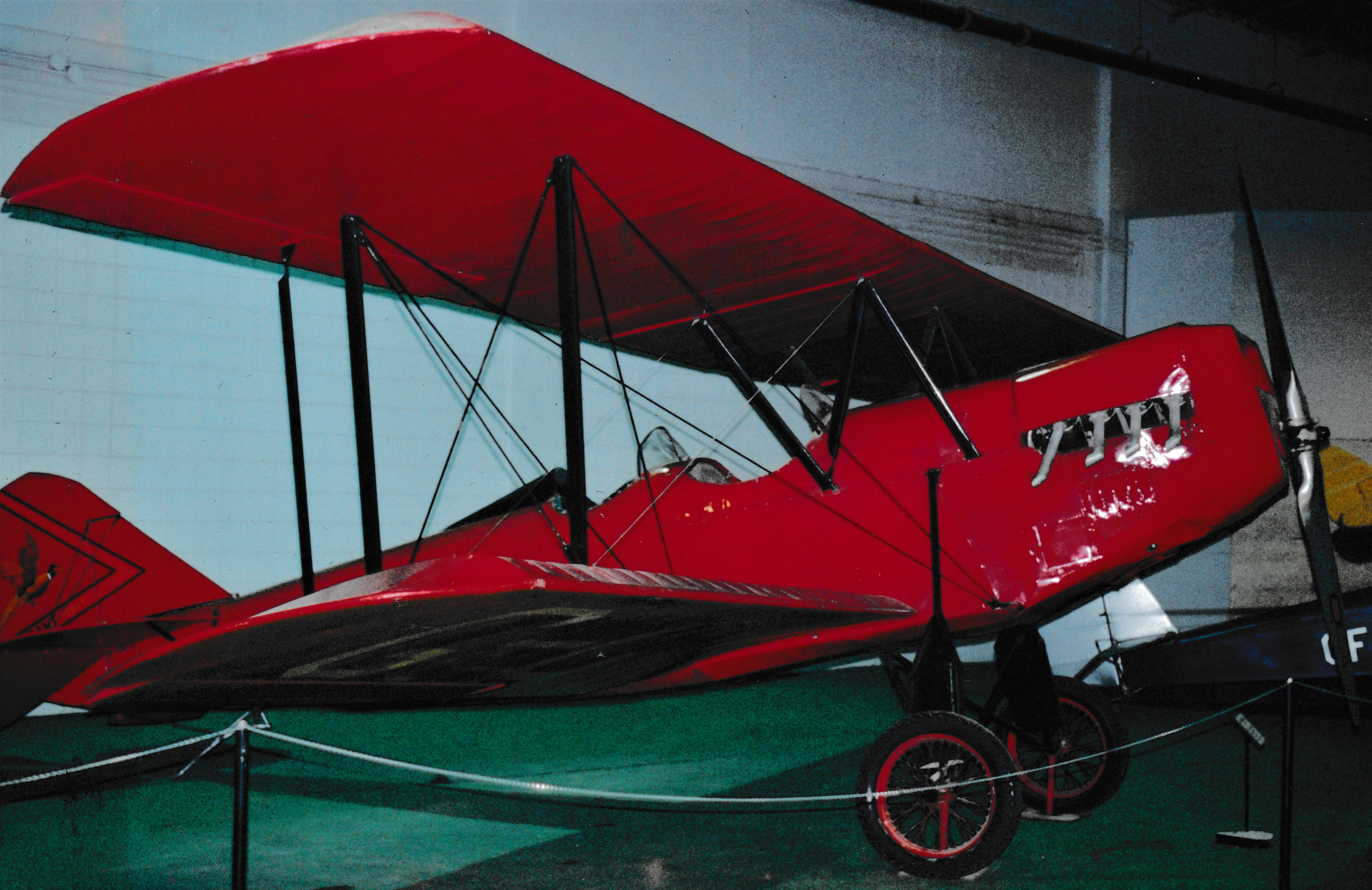
G-CASR. The "Red Pheasant". Western Development Museum, Moose Jaw. Built in Memphis, Missouri in 1927. Flown to Canada in 1928. Flew first airmail out of Prince Albert in 1931.

In 1927, flight school operator Lee R. Briggs had mobilized Memphis, Missouri community members to incorporate a company for aircraft production. The first aircraft was a three-seater designed by Orville Hickman. Production peaked at one unit per week. On December 5, 1927 Biggs died in a training accident. Aircraft racer Steve Wittman took over as chief test pilot. The Pheasant Flight engine was developed in house for the H-10 Aircraft, but only three were built. The H-10 was flown successfully across the country in several events. Wittman and convinced investor Adolf Bechaud to move the company to Fond du Lac, Wisconsin in 1929. The company was absorbed into Dayton Aero & Engineering Company in 1930.

Red Cherry Airlines started the first private airline in Saskatchewan with a Pheasant H-10 in 1928, using the aircraft for barnstorming charging passengers by weight for flights. The biplane eventually was sold to the Northern Aero Company flight school after the stock market crash. The airplane crashed in 1932, and was restored over four years in 1964. It now resides in the Western Development Museum in Moose Jaw.

One example of a Pheasant H-10 is owned by the Experimental Aircraft Association and is on display in the EAA AirVenture Museum.

A mural of the Pheasant aircraft is painted on the side of the original factory in Memphis,. 040°27′53″N 092°10′17″W and a volunteer effort in April 2012 accomplished purchasing a surviving Pheasant and returned it to the city of its manufacture.

== Aircraft ==
Summary of aircraft built by The Pheasant Aircraft Company
Model name	First flight	Number built	Type
Pheasant H-10	1927	41	Biplane
Pheasant Traveller	1929	3	Biplane
