= Memphis, Missouri =

City in Missouri, U.S.

- City
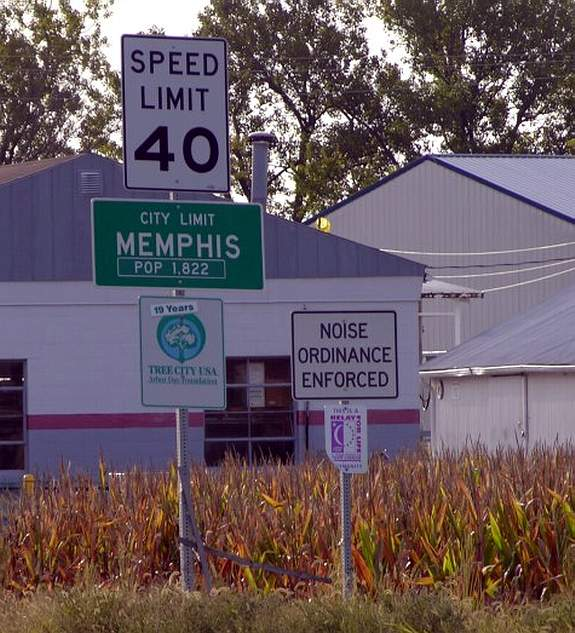
- Town sign

- Location of Memphis, Missouri
- Coordinates: 40°27′41″N 92°10′14″W
- Country: United States
- State: Missouri
- County: Scotland
- Established: May 15, 1843

Area
  - Total: 1.56 sq mi (4.05 km^{2})
  - Land: 1.56 sq mi (4.04 km^{2})
  - Water: 0.0077 sq mi (0.02 km^{2})
- Elevation: 764 ft (233 m)

Population (2020)
  - Total: 1,731
  - Density: 1,110.9/sq mi (428.92/km^{2})
- Time zone: UTC-6 (Central (CST))
  - Summer (DST): UTC-5 (CDT)
- ZIP code: 63555
- Area code: 660
- FIPS code: 29-47270
- GNIS feature ID: 2395092
- Website: www.cityofmemphismo.com

Memphis is a city in and the county seat of Scotland County, on the northern border of Missouri, United States. As of the 2020 census, its population was 1,731. U.S. Highway 136 passes near Memphis, which is east of Lancaster and west of Kahoka.

== History ==
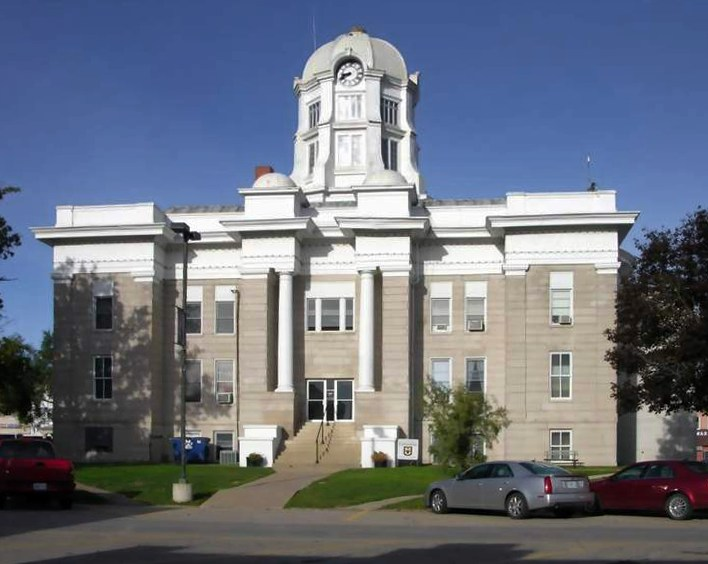
Scotland County court house in Memphis.

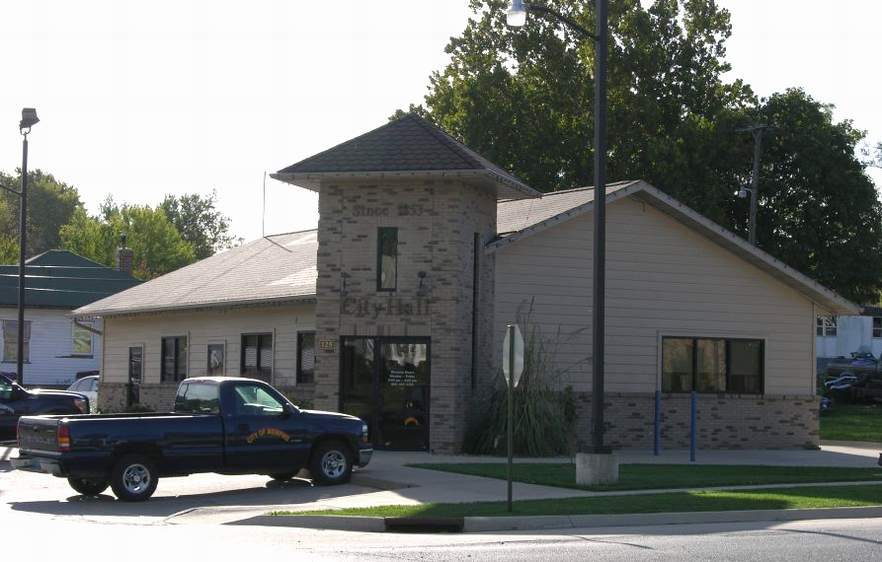
Memphis city hall.

Although the Missouri General Assembly organized Scotland County on January 29, 1841, the town of Memphis was not developed until more than two years later. County commissioners met at Sand Hill on May 15, 1843, to select the county seat. They chose a spot near the county's geographical center and, after some debate, named it Memphis, after Memphis, Egypt. The name had been previously used by a U.S. Post Office that operated near the North Fabius River a short distance away.

Early settler Samuel Cecil donated about 50 acres of land to the county for the new town. After being laid out in town lots, the original plat of Memphis was filed in county court on October 11, 1843. A few homes had already been developed in the area, the first being a log cabin constructed in 1835 by Burton Tompkins.

Scotland County's first courthouse, a two-story brick structure, was completed in June 1845 at a cost of $1,500. A decade later the county court declared the building unsafe. A second, larger courthouse was constructed in the middle of the town square in 1856 at a cost of $19,500. That building served the county well until the turn of the 20th century, but its small size made it outdated; it measured 40 by 70 feet. It was condemned in May 1905 and razed in early 1907. The current Scotland County courthouse was constructed between October 1907 and July 1908 at a cost of $50,000.

=== Civil War ===
Scotland County was the scene of two notable engagements during the American Civil War. On July 13, 1862, Confederate Colonel Joseph C. Porter approached Memphis in four converging columns totaling 125–169 men, and captured the city with little or no resistance. They first raided the federal armory, seizing about 100 muskets with cartridge boxes and ammunition, and several uniforms. The Confederates rounded up all adult males and took them to the courthouse. They had to swear not to divulge any information about the raiders for 48 hours. Porter freed all militiamen or suspected militiamen to await parole. He gave safe passage to a physician, an admitted Union supporter, who was anxious to return to a seriously ill wife. Porter's troops entered the courthouse and destroyed all indictments for horse-theft. This act has been variously interpreted as lawlessness, intervention on behalf of criminal associates, or interference with politically motivated, fraudulent charges.

According to the History of Shelby County, which is generally sympathetic to Porter, “Most conceded that Col. Porter’s purpose for capturing Memphis, MO. was to seize Dr. Wm. Aylward, a prominent Union man of the community.” Aylward was confined to a house after being captured by Captain Tom Stacy's men. Stacy was generally regarded as a bushwhacker; other members of Porter's command called his company "the chain gang". Guards claimed that Aylward escaped, but witnesses reported hearing a strangling. The doctor's body was found the next day, marked by signs consistent with hanging or strangulation. Supporters of Porter attributed Aylward's murder to Stacy, but questions remained.

=== 20th century ===
The Pheasant Aircraft Company was established in Memphis in 1928, before moving to Fond du Lac, Wisconsin in 1930.

== Geography ==
Memphis is located along the North Fabius River. According to the United States Census Bureau, the city has an area of 1.57 square miles (4.07 km^{2}), of which 1.56 square miles (4.04 km^{2}) is land and 0.01 square miles (0.03 km^{2}) is water.

=== Climate ===
Climate data for Memphis, Missouri (1991–2020 normals, extremes 1938–present)
Month	Jan	Feb	Mar	Apr	May	Jun	Jul	Aug	Sep	Oct	Nov	Dec	Year
Record high °F (°C)	70 (21)	78 (26)	85 (29)	91 (33)	99 (37)	102 (39)	106 (41)	105 (41)	103 (39)	98 (37)	88 (31)	75 (24)	106 (41)
Mean maximum °F (°C)	56.3 (13.5)	60.6 (15.9)	72.4 (22.4)	82.1 (27.8)	87.5 (30.8)	93.0 (33.9)	96.0 (35.6)	96.1 (35.6)	91.2 (32.9)	83.9 (28.8)	71.3 (21.8)	60.0 (15.6)	98.0 (36.7)
Mean daily maximum °F (°C)	32.5 (0.3)	37.5 (3.1)	49.8 (9.9)	62.2 (16.8)	72.1 (22.3)	81.8 (27.7)	85.8 (29.9)	84.3 (29.1)	77.3 (25.2)	64.6 (18.1)	49.8 (9.9)	37.7 (3.2)	61.3 (16.3)
Daily mean °F (°C)	23.1 (−4.9)	27.5 (−2.5)	39.2 (4.0)	50.6 (10.3)	61.3 (16.3)	71.0 (21.7)	75.1 (23.9)	73.2 (22.9)	65.2 (18.4)	53.1 (11.7)	39.5 (4.2)	28.9 (−1.7)	50.6 (10.3)
Mean daily minimum °F (°C)	13.8 (−10.1)	17.6 (−8.0)	28.6 (−1.9)	39.0 (3.9)	50.5 (10.3)	60.2 (15.7)	64.4 (18.0)	62.1 (16.7)	53.2 (11.8)	41.6 (5.3)	29.3 (−1.5)	20.0 (−6.7)	40.0 (4.4)
Mean minimum °F (°C)	−6.2 (−21.2)	−3.3 (−19.6)	10.1 (−12.2)	24.7 (−4.1)	36.8 (2.7)	48.8 (9.3)	55.3 (12.9)	52.7 (11.5)	39.7 (4.3)	26.7 (−2.9)	13.9 (−10.1)	1.2 (−17.1)	−12.3 (−24.6)
Record low °F (°C)	−24 (−31)	−23 (−31)	−13 (−25)	6 (−14)	25 (−4)	35 (2)	42 (6)	40 (4)	25 (−4)	15 (−9)	−13 (−25)	−23 (−31)	−24 (−31)
Average precipitation inches (mm)	1.51 (38)	1.47 (37)	2.15 (55)	3.65 (93)	5.48 (139)	4.71 (120)	4.30 (109)	3.78 (96)	3.57 (91)	2.98 (76)	2.16 (55)	1.58 (40)	37.34 (948)
Average snowfall inches (cm)	6.6 (17)	6.8 (17)	1.2 (3.0)	0.4 (1.0)	0.0 (0.0)	0.0 (0.0)	0.0 (0.0)	0.0 (0.0)	0.0 (0.0)	0.2 (0.51)	0.7 (1.8)	3.4 (8.6)	19.3 (49)
Average extreme snow depth inches (cm)	4.5 (11)	5.0 (13)	1.2 (3.0)	0.3 (0.76)	0.0 (0.0)	0.0 (0.0)	0.0 (0.0)	0.0 (0.0)	0.0 (0.0)	0.2 (0.51)	0.3 (0.76)	1.9 (4.8)	7.2 (18)
Average precipitation days (≥ 0.01 in)	5.0	5.4	6.9	8.5	10.0	8.8	7.2	6.7	6.2	6.6	5.5	5.5	82.3
Average snowy days (≥ 0.1 in)	2.5	2.4	0.7	0.1	0.0	0.0	0.0	0.0	0.0	0.1	0.4	2.3	8.5
Source: NOAA

== Demographics ==
Historical population
Census	Pop.	Note	%±
1850	183		—
1870	1,007		—
1880	1,418		40.8%
1890	1,780		25.5%
1900	2,195		23.3%
1910	1,984		−9.6%
1920	1,941		−2.2%
1930	1,728		−11.0%
1940	1,935		12.0%
1950	2,035		5.2%
1960	2,106		3.5%
1970	2,081		−1.2%
1980	2,105		1.2%
1990	2,094		−0.5%
2000	2,061		−1.6%
2010	1,822		−11.6%
2020	1,731		−5.0%
U.S. Decennial Census

=== 2020 census ===
As of the 2020 census, Memphis had a population of 1,731. The median age was 41.3 years. 23.5% of residents were under the age of 18 and 23.6% of residents were 65 years of age or older. For every 100 females there were 83.0 males, and for every 100 females age 18 and over there were 79.5 males age 18 and over.

0.0% of residents lived in urban areas, while 100.0% lived in rural areas.

There were 780 households in Memphis, of which 29.2% had children under the age of 18 living in them. Of all households, 40.3% were married-couple households, 17.2% were households with a male householder and no spouse or partner present, and 35.9% were households with a female householder and no spouse or partner present. About 39.5% of all households were made up of individuals and 19.8% had someone living alone who was 65 years of age or older.

There were 961 housing units, of which 18.8% were vacant. The homeowner vacancy rate was 1.4% and the rental vacancy rate was 14.4%.

Racial composition as of the 2020 census
Race	Number	Percent
White	1,642	94.9%
Black or African American	5	0.3%
American Indian and Alaska Native	4	0.2%
Asian	2	0.1%
Native Hawaiian and Other Pacific Islander	2	0.1%
Some other race	0	0.0%
Two or more races	76	4.4%
Hispanic or Latino (of any race)	16	0.9%

=== 2010 census ===
As of the census of 2010, there were 1,822 people, 813 households, and 466 families residing in the city. The population density was 1,167.9 inhabitants per square mile (450.9/km^{2}). There were 994 housing units at an average density of 637.2 per square mile (246.0/km^{2}). The racial makeup of the city was 98.5% White, 0.2% African American, 0.5% Native American, 0.1% Asian, 0.1% from other races, and 0.8% from two or more races. Hispanic or Latino of any race were 0.2% of the population.

There were 813 households, of which 27.2% had children under the age of 18 living with them, 41.5% were married couples living together, 10.9% had a female householder with no husband present, 4.9% had a male householder with no wife present, and 42.7% were non-families. 39.1% of all households were made up of individuals, and 20% had someone living alone who was 65 years of age or older. The average household size was 2.15 and the average family size was 2.85.

The median age in the city was 43.8 years. 24% of residents were under the age of 18; 7.3% were between the ages of 18 and 24; 20.2% were from 25 to 44; 25.1% were from 45 to 64; and 23.3% were 65 years of age or older. The gender makeup of the city was 44.6% male and 55.4% female.

=== 2000 census ===
As of the census of 2000, there were 2,061 people, 888 households, and 523 families residing in the city. The population density was 1,316.1 inhabitants per square mile (508.1/km^{2}). There were 1,052 housing units at an average density of 671.8 per square mile (259.4/km^{2}). The racial makeup of the city was 98.88% White, 0.19% Native American, 0.15% Asian, 0.15% from other races, and 0.63% from two or more races. Hispanic or Latino of any race were 0.53% of the population.

There were 888 households, out of which 25.9% had children under the age of 18 living with them, 47.0% were married couples living together, 9.2% had a female householder with no husband present, and 41.1% were non-families. 36.8% of all households were made up of individuals, and 21.7% had someone living alone who was 65 years of age or older. The average household size was 2.18 and the average family size was 2.87.

In the city the population was spread out, with 23.0% under the age of 18, 7.8% from 18 to 24, 21.6% from 25 to 44, 19.1% from 45 to 64, and 28.5% who were 65 years of age or older. The median age was 43 years. For every 100 females there were 79.4 males. For every 100 females age 18 and over, there were 73.6 males.

The median income for a household in the city was $24,508, and the median income for a family was $33,750. Males had a median income of $21,947 versus $17,134 for females. The per capita income for the city was $16,220. About 15.2% of families and 17.6% of the population were below the poverty line, including 22.8% of those under age 18 and 16.2% of those age 65 or over.

== Education ==
Public education in Memphis is administered by Scotland County R-I School District.

The Scotland County Memorial Library is in Memphis, serving the city and all county residents.

== Notable people ==
- Alexandre Hogue, realist painter based in Dallas, Texas, known mostly for landscapes
- Tom Horn, Chief of Scouts during Apache Wars, range detective, gunfighter
- George Saling, track & field athlete, gold medal winner at 1932 Summer Olympics
- Adrienne Wilkinson, TV, film and voiceover actress; notable roles on Xena: Warrior Princess and As If.

== Gallery ==
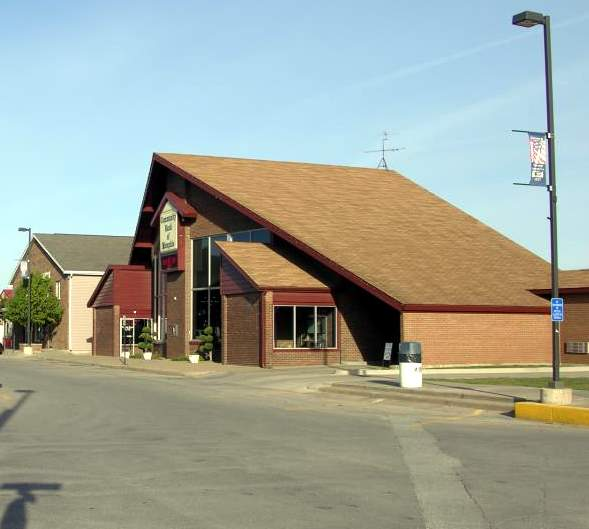
North side of the Memphis square. September, 2012.

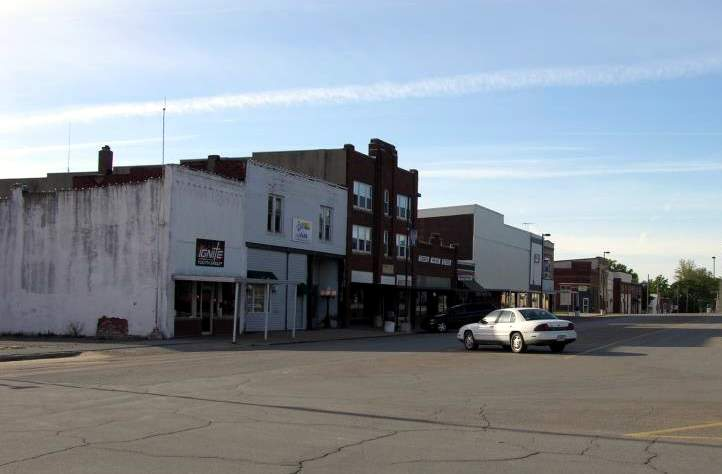
East side of the Memphis square. September, 2012.

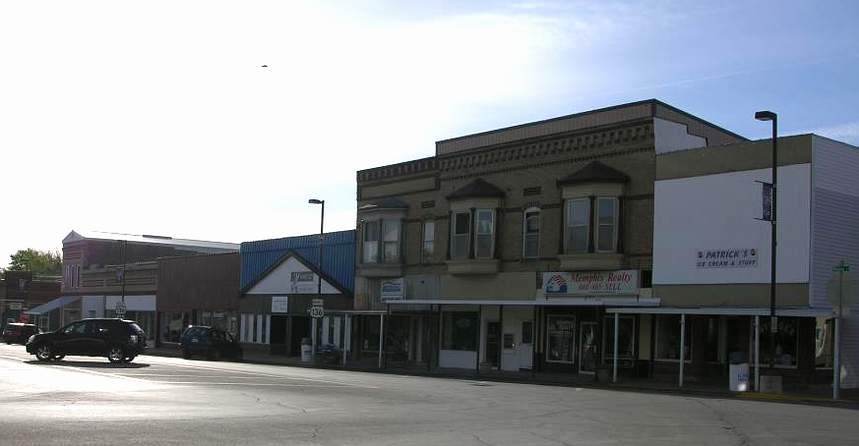
South side of the Memphis square. September, 2012.

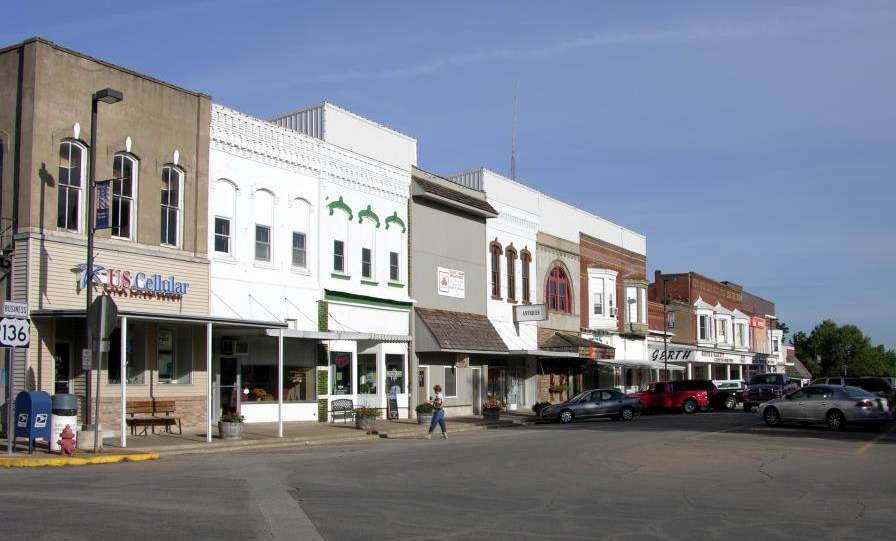
West side of the Memphis square. September, 2012.

== See also ==
- List of cities in Missouri
