= Vilhelm Lauritzen =

Danish architect (1894–1984)

- Born: 9 September 1894; Slagelse, Denmark
- Died: 22 December 1984 (aged 90)
- Occupation: Architect
- Awards: C. F. Hansen Medal (1954)
- Buildings: Radiohuset; Copenhagen Airport; Embassy of Denmark in Washington, D.C.

Vilhelm Lauritzen (9 September 1894 – 22 December 1984) was a leading Danish modern architect, founder of the still active architectural firm Vilhelm Lauritzen Arkitekter.

== Biography ==
Vilhelm Lauritzen was born in Slagelse, Denmark. He studied at the Royal Danish Academy of Fine Arts in Copenhagen, graduating in 1921. The following year he founded his own firm, Vilhelm Lauritzen Arkitekter, in 1928 and remained active in the firm until 1969. He received the Academy's Gold Medal in 1926 and up through the 1920s he created a number of monumental designs in a classicist style which were never realized.

Towards the end of the decade he travelled in Central Europe and became acquainted with the latest trends in Functionalist architecture with its technical and structural innovations. This inspired him to a grounded and restrained Modernism and it was with such buildings that he had his breakthrough.

His first large commission to be built was the Daells Varehus department store in Copenhagen built in stages from 1928 to 1935 as one of the first examples of Modern architecture in Denmark. He went on to win the competition for the design the first Copenhagen Airport which was constructed from 1937 to 1939. Another major project included the national Danish Broadcasting Corporation DR Radio Building (Radiohuset) while its Television Building was designed by his firm with Mogens Boertmann (1918-2017) as its principal architect.

Lauritzen also designed furniture, often in connection with his buildings. His lamps, especially his table lamps from the 1930s, manufactured by Louis Poulsen, continue to arouse interest at auctions.

== Selected buildings ==
- Daells Varehus, Copenhagen, Denmark (with Frits Schlegel, 1933 )
- Radiohuset, Frederiksberg, Denmark (1936–41)
- Copenhagen Airport terminal (1937–1939). The entire terminal was listed, moved and restored in 1998.
- Gladsaxe Town Hall, Gladsaxe, Denmark (1937)
- Folkets Hus, Copenhagen, Denmark (1935–56)
- Terminal 3, Copenhagen Airport, Copenhagen, Denmark (1995)
- Shell House, Copenhagen, Denmark
- Embassy of Denmark in Washington, D.C., Washington, D.C., USA (1960)

== See also ==
- Architecture of Denmark
