= Baker Furniture =

American furniture manufacturer founded in 1890

- Type: Private
- Industry: Furniture manufacturing
- Founded: 1890
- Founder: Siebe Baker
- Headquarters: Connelly Springs, North Carolina, U.S.
- Area served: Worldwide
- Products: Seating, case goods, upholstery, lighting, accessories, outdoor furniture
- Subsidiaries: McGuire Furniture

Baker Furniture is an American furniture manufacturer founded in 1890 in Allegan, Michigan, by Siebe Baker. The company produces case goods, seating, and decorative furnishings for residential interiors and distributes its products internationally through design showrooms and selected retail partners.

== History ==
Baker Furniture began in 1890 when Dutch immigrant Siebe Baker opened a small woodworking shop in Allegan, Michigan. The business expanded during the early twentieth century, contributing to the growth of the western Michigan furniture industry, which became a significant center for American furniture manufacturing.

During the mid-twentieth century, the company produced traditional reproductions and modern collections, reflecting European and American design influences. In the late twentieth century, Baker moved the majority of its operations to Connelly Springs, North Carolina, aligning with the region's established furniture manufacturing sector.

In 2014, Baker marked its 125th anniversary with a series of exhibitions and programs focusing on its design history and archival collections.

In 2025, the company's 135th anniversary coincided with new product introductions and designer collaborations, noted in contemporary design coverage.

== Products and operations ==
Baker produces furniture for living, dining, bedroom, and outdoor spaces, as well as lighting, mirrors, and decorative accessories. The company sells through interior design showrooms, luxury multi-line retailers, and international distributors in North America, Europe, Asia, and the Middle East.

Several in-house collections have been part of Baker's catalog, including Milling Road and Baker Luxe. The Stately Homes Collection, introduced in the early 1980s, consisted of historically documented reproductions from British and European estates.

== Design collaborations ==
Since the late 1990s, Baker and its sister brand, McGuire Furniture, have collaborated with independent designers on licensed furniture lines.

- Barbara Barry began working with Baker in the late 1990s. Her collections feature simplified forms and neutral materials and have been periodically expanded.
- Thomas Pheasant introduced his first collection for Baker in the early 2000s. His work combines classical proportions with modern detailing and has been featured in multiple design publications.
- Laura Kirar began collaborating with Baker and McGuire in 2005. Her designs integrate natural materials and references to traditional craft practices.
- Jacques Garcia partnered with Baker during the 2010s, contributing designs influenced by European interiors and historical styles.
- Jean-Louis Deniot launched a collection for Baker in 2016, drawing on neoclassical references paired with contemporary finishes.
- Paola Navone and OTTO Studio collaborated with Baker-McGuire on a Mediterranean-themed collection introduced in 2023.
- Susan Ferrier partnered with Baker-McGuire in 2025 on a collection emphasizing natural materials and sculptural forms.
- Orlando Diaz-Azcuy introduced a collection for Baker in 2025. Media coverage noted the collaboration in the context of the company's 135th anniversary.

== Recognition ==
In 2015, Baker supplied mahogany dining chairs for the State Dining Room of the White House as part of an interior renovation.

== Archival collections ==
The Grand Rapids Public Library maintains an archival collection documenting the company's early business records, catalogs, and photographs.

== See also ==
- McGuire Furniture
- American furniture manufacturers
- Interior design
