= Television in Greenland =

Television was introduced to Greenland in the late 1960s, first in the form of cable television companies (the current Nanoq Media). Terrestrial broadcasting did not start until 1982, when KNR TV started. Only the KNR and DR channels are free-to-air; they are delivered as part of an encrypted digital terrestrial platform.

== History ==
At the beginning, cable companies received recordings of DR Television's Danish output. The first terrestrial TV broadcasts from KNR began on 1 November 1982, the bulk of its line-up consisting of relays from Denmark. From 1983, it aimed at increasing the amount of original productions, with the creation of children's programmes promoting the Greenlandic language. No full local television news existed until 1 September 1989, when Qanorooq began.

Digital terrestrial television was first tested in December 2000 as a feasibility study for 50 subscribers. The 17-channel service began in August 2002, and caused KNR to lose viewers. Moreover, producing television programmes for a small population such as Greenland's is uneconomic.

DR and TV 2 relays ended on KNR1 on 7 January 2013, when it was decided that Greenland should have five free-to-air channels: KNR1, KNR2, DR 1, DR 2 and DR Ultra (later replaced by DR Ramasjang). In 2015, Nuuk TV was renamed Nanoq Media upon beginning the delivery of its services to associated companies in other parts of Greenland.

On 21 June 2020, both KNR1 and KNR2 switched to 720p HD resolution.

== Free-to-air channels ==
- KNR1
- KNR2
- DR 1
- DR 2
- DR Ramasjang

== Nunatsinni Tusagassiuutilerisut Kattuffiat ==
Nunatsinni Tusagassiuutilerisut Kattuffiat is an association of local television companies, which mostly provide cable services. It was approved in 2014 after Nuuk TV and Arctic TV joined forces to create a new umbrella organisation for these stations to replace the troubled STTK, which was mostly inactive.

As of 2005, the STTK member companies were:

- Tusaat TV (Aasiaat)
- Arctic TV (llulissat)
- Arfivik-TV (Qeqertarsuaq-Nanortalik)
- Nuuk TV
- Paamiut TV (Paamiut)
- Qaqortoq TV (Qaqortoq)
- Qeqertaq TV (Illulissat)
- Sisimiut TV (Sisimiut)
