= Digital terrestrial television in Denmark =

Digital terrestrial television in Denmark was technically launched in March 2006 after some years of public trials. The official launch was at midnight on 1 November 2009, when analogue broadcasts ceased nationwide.

As of June 2020, five national multiplexes are available. MUX 1 is owned by DR but operated by Cibicom A/S. They broadcast free-to-air channels only. MUX 2 - 5 are owned and operated by Norlys broadcasting encrypted pay-TV only.

== History ==
=== Pre-launch ===
In 1999, a trial was launched in Copenhagen and Zealand. Another trial was launched in 2002 on northern Jutland, broadcasting the three public service channels and an experimental regional channel called "TV 2/Nord-Digital".

In June 2005, a broad majority consisting of Venstre, the Conservative People's Party, the Social Democrats, the Radical Liberal Party, the Socialist People's Party and Danish People's Party agreed that the analogue broadcasts would cease in October 2009.

=== National launch ===
The technical launch was made on 31 March 2006, after some months of national trials with one multiplex covering the entire country. It offered the national analogue channels DR1 and TV 2, as well as DR2, a stream for signed simulcasts of news programmes on the three other channels and the MHP services DR extra and TV 2 Extra. On 19 February 2008 DR Update started broadcasting on the simulcast channel when this channel was not used for simulcasting (between 17:00 and 20:00). The multiplex was operated by DIGI-TV I/S, a joint-venture between DR and TV 2.

On 11 June 2007 the Danish Ministry of Culture announced that the six parties had agreed on how the extension of the network of a total of 8 multiplexes would continue. Four multiplexes (MUX 3 to 6) would be given to a commercial gatekeeper which would be required to have a varied offering and would be chosen through a "beauty contest". DIGI-TV, would be given another multiplex, MUX 2, in addition to its MUX 1. MUX 2 would be carrying the children and culture channel from DR, a parliament channel, more airtime for the TV 2 regions and community television. MUX7 was on 29 June 2009 allocated to use for mobile broadband, set to launch in 2013. The fate of MUX8 was not decided.

On 27 March 2008 Boxer got the gatekeeper rights for MUX 3, 4 and 5. Boxer went on air on 2 February 2009 using the granted multiplexes. The commercial gatekeeper would be required to carry at least one channel from neighbouring countries and a local channel. A maximum of 25 percent of the capacity could be used for "high-pay" channels (such as Canal+).

The official launch was made on 1 November 2009, which also marked the launch of the new public channels DR Ramasjang, DR K, DR HD (replaced by DR3 in January 2013) and a 24‑hour version of DR Update (replaced by DR Ultra in March 2013). Also on the same day, Copenhagen-based company Open Channel Aps launched a trial multiplex, "MUXCPH", with local channels such as Kanal København.

=== Post-launch ===
==== Expansion ====
On 1 November 2010, Boxer was granted its fourth multiplex – MUX6. The conditions at the time were that 15% of the capacity should be given to DR. 35% to other companies, while Boxer were free to use the remaining 50% themselves for DVB-H-services. However, these conditions were dropped on 10 August 2012. It was announced MUX6 would use DVB-T2 for HDTV, set to launch in October 2013. On 26 September 2013 Boxer launched its fourth multiplex - MUX6 - which uses DVB-T2 with MPEG-4.

On 1 July 2011 the Danish Ministry of Culture announced that MUX8 were to be used for digital TV. A gatekeeper as well as a launch date for MUX8 has yet to be announced.

On 1 November 2012 Open Channel's trial of MUXCPH was replaced with the trial of a new DVB-T2 trial multiplex, MUXCPH-2. Now broadcasting both local channel Kanal København as well as international channel France 24, from the TDC radio tower at Borups Alle in the center of Copenhagen, the signal can be received by more than 700,000 households. In April 2013, Open Channel got permission to reuse the first MUXCPH for a new DVB-T2 mux with HEVC coding and HbbTV capabilities.

==== High-definition ====
On 11 January 2012, the free-to-air MUX1 switched from MPEG-2 to the newer MPEG-4 codec standard. This made it possible to broadcast DR1 and the TV 2 regional channels in 720p HD. Later, on 1 April, the commercial MUX5 converted to the DVB-T2 system for HDTV use. A further focus was placed on HD when, on 5 April 2016, Boxer stopped simulcasting HD and SD versions of the same channels, focusing on HD versions only. In late 2016 and early 2017 DIGI-TV made changes to their two multiplexes making it possible to launch both DR2 and DR K in 720p HD.

=== 2020 changes ===
In May 2017, the Ministry of Culture proposed two scenarios on what the terrestrial television infrastructure in Denmark could look like after 3 April 2020 when Boxer's gatekeeper rights expire, and the 700 MHz band switching from TV to mobile broadband. In scenario A, all 5 UHF multiplexes and the single VHF multiplex would be given to the gatekeeper, with the condition of broadcasting free-to-air channels from DR and TV 2. In scenario B, a single UHF multiplex would be given to Digi-TV (the joint-venture between DR and TV 2) to be used for free-to-air broadcasting. The remaining 4 UHF multiplexes as well as the single VHF multiplex would be given to the gatekeeper. In both scenarios it is expected that every multiplex will use DVB-T2 and HEVC.

In December 2017, it was announced that scenario B had been chosen, and a new gatekeeper for minimum 4 multiplexes will be chosen through a "beauty contest" which ran through 5 March 2018. On 13 March 2018, the current gatekeeper Boxer was announced as being the only applicant. On 6 June 2018, Boxer was announced as the winner, and they would continue to be the gatekeeper after 3 April 2020.

As part of a new media agreement by the Folketing in 2018 with a permanent lower budget for DR, DR announced in 2019 that three of their free-to-air channels would close. On 2 January 2020, DR3, DR K, and DR Ultra ceased broadcasting.

Due to the COVID-19 pandemic it was announced that the national switch-over to DVB-T2 would be postponed to June 2. The argument being that some people (especially the elderly) would not have purchased DVB-T2 equipment, and would be left with no means of keeping up-to-date with new information regarding the pandemic.

On 2 June 2020, the number of available multiplexes decreased from 6 to 5, with a switch-over from DVB-T to DVB-T2 on all 5 multiplexes. This made it possible to broadcast DR Ramasjang in HD. The joint-venture DIGI-TV shut down, with the ownership of MUX1 transferred to DR.

In October 2021, Boxer was folded into parent company Norlys and the name Boxer was dropped.

In June 2026 Open Channel seized operations and stopped broadcasting their local Copenhagen MUXs.

== Current channels ==
As of 1 March 2024.

LCN	Channel	MUX
1.	DR1 HD	1
2.	TV 2 HD	2
3.	DR2 HD	1
4.	DR Ramasjang HD	1
5.	TV3 HD	2
6.	Kanal 5 HD	2
7.	TV 2 NEWS HD	3
8.	TV3+ HD	2
9.	TV3 Puls HD	4
10.	Kanal 4 HD	5
11.	TV 2 Charlie HD	3
12.	TV 2 Fri HD	3
13.	DK4 HD	2
14.	TV 2 Echo HD	3
15.	Investigation Discovery HD	4
16.	6'eren HD	5
17.	Canal 9 HD	5
18.	TV 2 Sport HD	3
19.	TV 2 Sport X HD	3
20.	TV3 Sport HD	4
21.	TV3 MAX HD	4
22.	Eurosport 1 HD	5
23.	Eurosport 2 HD	5
24.	See HD	4
25.	Discovery HD	5
26.	National Geographic HD	4
27.	Animal Planet HD	5
28.	TLC HD	4
29.	Nickelodeon	3
30.	Disney Channel HD	3
31.	National Geographic Wild	5
32.	NickMusic	2
33.	TV 2 Regionerne HD	1
34.	ZDF	3
35.	SVT1	2
36.	NRK1	2
37.	FOLKETINGET HD	1
38.	Tegnsprog/lokal-tv	1
39.	DR1 Synstolkning HD (audio description)	1
40.	DR2 Synstolkning HD (audio description)	1
