= DR HD =

- Country: Denmark
- Headquarters: DR Byen; Copenhagen, Denmark

Programming
- Picture format: 720p (HDTV)

Ownership
- Owner: DR
- Sister channels: DR1; DR2; DR K DR Update

History
- Launched: 1 November 2009; 15 years ago
- Closed: 28 January 2013; 12 years ago (3 years, 88 days)
- Replaced by: DR3

DR HD was a Danish high-definition television channel and DR's sixth licence-funded channel. The channel launched on 1 November 2009. All content on DR HD were in HD quality; no upscaled standard definition programmes were broadcast. The channel acted as a testing ground for the then-new HD technology, as DR and other broadcasters are increasingly moving to HD broadcasting. Since its launch, the channel aired a limited number of movies and shows in surround sound.

The channel was shut down on 28 January 2013 and replaced by DR3.
