= KNR1 =

- Country: Denmark
- Broadcast area: Greenland
- Headquarters: Nuuk, Greenland

Programming
- Languages: Greenlandic; Danish (subtitles)
- Picture format: 16:9 720p (HDTV)

Ownership
- Owner: KNR
- Sister channels: KNR2

History
- Launched: 1 November 1982; 44 years ago
- Former names: KNR (1982–2013)

Availability

Terrestrial
- Nanoq Media: Channel 1

Streaming media
- Watch KNR1 online

KNR1 is a Greenlandic television channel owned by Kalaallit Nunaata Radioa. All programming is in Greenlandic; however Danish subtitles are available, including its news service Qanorooq. In the past, it used to carry programmes from DR and TV 2, but this arrangement ended when DR's channels were made free-to-air on the terrestrial platform in January 2013.

== History ==
KNR was not the first television station in Greenland.

There were attempts at bringing television to Greenland in the late 1960s by Jørgen Benzon and Ole Winstedt, creating Godthåb lukkede Telenet (Godthåb Closed-Circuit Television Network) in May 1966. Unlike KNR, it was a cable company, eventually becoming Nuuk TV (now Nanoq Media).

While KNR was planning its television service, in February 1982, its director Søren Bach started a campaign for viewers to send their photographs for it to use as a continuity device, including pictures of the past that had high historical value. On 1 November 1982, KNR started terrestrial television broadcasts, though it was mostly relays of DR programming. They were already set on the upcoming general elections, set for April next year. After the elections, KNR would start airing its own programmes for children in an attempt to save the local culture.

On 1 September 1989, the first edition of Qanorooq was broadcast. Until 1994, its studio was in a former KNI hangar.

KNR faced a fall in television production after 1 August 2002, when Nuuk TV restructured its offer and launched its local channel, coinciding with its conversion into a digital service. The service enabled locals to have access to more, especially foreign, programming, while viewing KNR's programming as having limited resources and lacking quality. Local news coverage was reduced in September 2009.

In early December 2012, the Autonomous Government approved a plan to increase the number of free-to-air television channels in Greenland. The changes to the system implied the arrival of a second KNR channel, KNR2, as well as relays of DR1, DR2 and DR Ultra. KNR1 used to mix local programming with DR's output, but considering DR1 was going to be made available across Greenland on terrestrial TV, the channel had to reduce its airtime significantly, airing the programme schedule during its downtime. A limited number of foreign programmes was still seen, mostly children's programmes targeting a largely preschool demographic. The changes took place on 7 January 2013. From 5 September 2016, news items from local television stations (Nanoq Media Lokal, Sisimiut TV, Aasiaat TV, Arctic TV, etc.) were added to Qanorooq, as KNR began cooperation agreements with NTK (Nunatsinni Tusagassiuutilerisut Kattuffiat) member stations. Initially, only Nuuk TV items were seen, but the other stations were added by the end of the year.

On 21 June 2020, both KNR1 and KNR2 switched to 720p HD resolution.
