= DR K =

- Country: Kingdom of Denmark
- Broadcast area: Danish Realm
- Headquarters: DR Byen; Copenhagen, Denmark

Programming
- Language: Danish
- Picture format: 720p (HDTV)

Ownership
- Owner: DR
- Sister channels: DR1; DR2; DR3; DR Ramasjang; DR Ultra

History
- Launched: 1 November 2009; 16 years ago
- Closed: 2 January 2020; 6 years ago

Links
- Website: dr.dk/drk

Availability

DR K was a Danish free-to-air television channel owned by state broadcaster DR. Its programming was centred towards culture and history.

== History ==
Originally conceived as a channel dedicated to history, the channel was first presented in 2005 in the run up to DR's new settlement with the Danish state. It would draw on DR's vast archives of Danish material. The effort would be combined with digitalising DR's archives and launching interactive services. There would also be special channels for children, the youth and drama.

When the media settlement was presented in June 2006, the plans were to launch a combined channel with children's programmes in the daytime and history programmes in the evening.

The names of the new digital terrestrial channels were presented in March 2009: DR K, DR Ramasjang (for children) and DR HD together with DR1, DR2 and DR Update. By that time, the channel had developed into a cultural channel dedicated to arts, history, design, fashion and fiction programming. The channel would timeshare between 4pm and 12am.

DR K premiered on 1 November 2009 and is broadcast on the digital terrestrial television network (DTT) and pay television platforms.

The channel switched from SD broadcasting to 720p HD in December 2016 on DTT, followed by pay television providers in early 2017.

The channel was targeted by a 20% cut in the budget plan by DR in September 2018, with the aim of ending the channel in 2020 and merging its output with that of DR2.

== Logos and identities ==
2009-2013

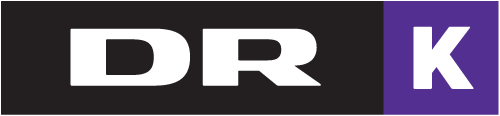
2013-2016

2016-2020
