= KNR2 =

- Country: Denmark
- Broadcast area: Greenland
- Headquarters: Nuuk, Greenland

Programming
- Languages: Greenlandic; Danish (subtitles)
- Picture format: 16:9 720p (HDTV)

Ownership
- Owner: KNR
- Sister channels: KNR1

History
- Launched: 7 January 2013; 13 years ago

Availability

Streaming media
- KNR: Watch KNR2 online

KNR2 is a Greenlandic television channel owned by Kalaallit Nunaata Radioa. It is a pop-up channel, providing parliamentary coverage as well as sporting events.

== History ==
The channel was created per a December 2012 decision to enable live coverage of DR1, DR2 and DR Ultra free-to-air in Greenland while converting KNR1 into an all-Greenlandic channel, effective 7 January 2013. The channel's fixed programming at the time of launching was limited to live Inatsisartut sessions, as well as coverage of national and international events. After a new agreement with Naalakkersuisut in June 2016 (initially due spring 2015), one of the corporation's goals was to increase the channel's use.

On 21 June 2020, both KNR1 and KNR2 switched to 720p HD resolution.
