= DR Update =

- Country: Denmark
- Broadcast area: Danish Realm
- Headquarters: DR Byen; Copenhagen, Denmark

Programming
- Language(s): Danish
- Picture format: 16:9 576i (SDTV)

Ownership
- Owner: DR
- Sister channels: DR1; DR2; DR3; DR K

History
- Launched: 7 June 2007
- Closed: 4 March 2013
- Replaced by: DR Ultra

DR Update was a Danish 24-hour television news channel broadcast by DR. Although the channel was primarily distributed via the web, it was also available on regular broadcast television from the start on satellite from Canal Digital and from some community antennas. The programme content was updated between 07:00 and 23:00.

In January 2008, the Danish Parliament approved broadcast of the channel on the digital terrestrial network. The channel used frequency space which was used to simulcast news bulletins in sign language between in the early evening. DR Update broadcast round-the-clock, except between 17:00 and 20:00, when the space was used by sign language simulcasts. The terrestrial launch took place on 19 February 2008. With the terrestrial launch, the channel underwent slight changes by making the news loop six minutes long. From November 2009, DR Update later broadcast on its own channel. The sign language simulcasts were instead broadcast by DR Synstolkning, where it is on 24/7. In addition to digital terrestrial network, DR Update became available on the Viasat platform on 1 April 2008.

From 12 March 2008, the 12:00 and 15:00 editions of TV Avisen were replaced by DR Update.

From 1 February 2011, DR Update also produced the news on DR1 at 17:50. A new studio, new graphics and a longer, 10-minute news loop were debuted on the same day.

DR Update was closed and replaced by DR Ultra on 4 March 2013.

In 2023, DR launched a new dedicated news channel called TVA Live which broadcasts online-only on DR TV in HD.

== Hosts ==
- Lotte Thor
- Louise Bjerregaard
- Morten Schnell Lauritzen
- Louise Reumert
- Kasper Jessing
- Kristian Porsgaard
- Maria Yde

== Management ==
- Per Bjerre
- Lau Rabjerg-Eriksen
