= P7 =

P7, P.7, or P-7 may refer to:

== Aircraft ==
- Boeing XP-7, a prototype United States biplane fighter of the 1920s
- Lockheed P-7, a proposed patrol aircraft ordered by the U.S. Navy
- Piaggio P.7, an Italian hydrofoil racing seaplane of 1929
- PZL P.7, a 1930 Polish fighter aircraft

== Science ==
- p7 protein, a protein providing nucleocapsid of HIV
- Period 7 of the periodic table
- Seoul Semiconductor, high-energy quad-chip LED light (SSC P7)
- HAT-P-7b, an extrasolar planet discovered in 2008

=== Computer science ===
- Intel Itanium processor code-name
- Intel NetBurst, a seventh generation x86 microarchitecture
- X.400 protocol for access of a message store from a user agent

== Other ==
- Cinturato P7 tire developed by Pirelli
- DR P7 Mix, a former radio station operated by the Danish Broadcasting Corporation
- Heckler & Koch P7, a semi-automatic pistol manufactured in Germany
- Honda P7, a battery electric mid-size crossover SUV
- ProSieben, a German television channel
- Russian Sky Airlines IATA airline code
- South Scanian Regiment, Swedish Army armoured regiment with a designation P 7
- XPeng P7, a battery electric executive sedan

== See also ==
- 7P (disambiguation)
