= John Dillermand =

Danish animated children's television series

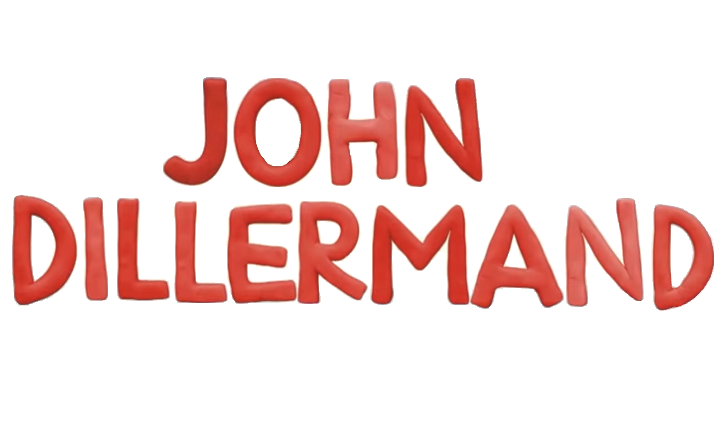
- Genre: Children's; Adventure; Comedy
- No. of seasons: 2
- No. of episodes: 39

Production
- Running time: Five minutes per episode

Original release
- Network: DR Ramasjang
- Release: 3 January 2021 – present

John Dillermand ("John Penisman", "John Willieman" or "John Dongman") is a Danish stop motion animated children's television series about a man and his very long penis. It premiered on 3 January 2021 on DR Ramasjang.

== Premise ==
John Dillermand is a middle-aged man who wears a red-and-white striped bathing costume. He has a penis that can extend to a length of dozens of meters. John uses his prehensile penis (which stretches within his clothes) as a tool, such as to tame lions or to fly about like a helicopter. But it also often acts independently of John, getting him into trouble.

== Episodes ==
The series premiered on DRTV on 2 January 2021. The second season came out 14 October 2022.

=== Season 1 ===
Episode	Danish title	English translation	Plot
1	John lufter hunde	John Walks Dogs	John becomes the neighborhood dog walker using his penis as a dog leash.
2	John Dillermand	John Penisman	John has the world's longest penis. Instead of feeling embarrassed for being different, he realizes his penis can be a superpower.
3	John tjener penge	John Earns Money	John accidentally knocks over his grandmother's vase with his large penis and must find a job so that he can afford to buy her a new one.
4	John vil vinde	John Will Win	When John's grandmother sends him outside to play games with the neighbors, he becomes so competitive that he cheats using his penis.
5	John tager på jagt	John Goes Hunting	John's grandmother gives him a gun and asks him to shoot a pheasant for dinner.
6	John ordner have	John Fixes the Garden	While helping his grandmother in the garden, John has trouble with his penis and ends up hitting a neighbor and cutting down the apple tree with it.
7	John i Zoologisk have	John at the Zoo	At the zoo, John accidentally steals ice cream using his penis and fights an escaped lion.
8	John i skovskole	John at the Forest School	John's penis gets in the way of forest activities such as carving wood, pitching a tent, and tying knots.
9	John på fisketur	John Goes on a Fishing Trip	John uses his penis as a fishing rod and is teased by other fishers for catching old trash, not fish.
10	John fejrer Oldemors fødselsdag	John Celebrates Grandma's Birthday	John accidentally forgets his grandmother's birthday.
11	John redder Julen	John Saves Christmas	John meets Santa Claus on Christmas Eve and saves the day.
12	John er postbud	John the Postman	John accidentally knocks the mailman off his bike and has to deliver the mail himself.
13	John tager skraldet	John Takes the Trash	John is able to pick out the garbage faster than the garbage truck, but then must find a place to put it.

=== Season 2 ===
Episode	Danish title	Literal translation	Plot
1	John skal tisse	John Needs to Pee	
2	Dilleren på månen	The Penis on the Moon	
3	Buller bliver væk	Noise Disappears	
4	John kagemand	John the Cake Man	John gets a job at a bakery and a kagemand version of his anatomy is created.
5	John handler ind	John is Shopping	
6	John til hest	John on Horseback	
7	John og tidsmaskinen	John and the Time Machine	
8	John elsker mus	John Loves Mice	
9	John spiller fløjte	John Plays the Flute	
10	Betjent Dillerman	Officer Dillermand	
11	John alene hjemme	John Home Alone	
12	John klæder sig ud	John Dresses Up	
13	John bussemand	John the Bus Driver	John is the bus driver but his penis begins to control the bus, creating problems for the city.
14	Slik eller ballade	Trick or Treat	
15	John laver pølser	John Makes Sausages	
16	John i Tivoli	John in Tivoli	
17	John i sneen	John in the Snow	John goes skiing and his penis causes fear and chaos involving a giant snowball.
18	John får en storebror	John Gets a Big Brother	
19	Godt Nytår John	Happy New Year John	

== Development and broadcast ==
The series is aimed at four- to eight-year-olds and was developed by the Danish public broadcaster DR, in association with the sex education association Sex & Samfund. It premiered on 3 January 2021 on DR's children's channel DR Ramasjang. The first season, consisting of 13 five-minute episodes, was made available on the internet on 2 January 2021.

== Reception ==
Whether John Dillermand is funny or flat is a matter of taste, but it is exactly this kind of free thinking that DR must stick to. The children's universes on Netflix, Disney+, Viaplay and all the other streaming services are so scrubbed and gender stereotyped that half of them could be enough.

— Politiken editorial

John Dillermand was popular in Denmark upon release, with 250,000 children viewing the first episode in five days, and went viral. The series has found fans among Danish TV personalities and children; according to a DR executive, children were making snowmen, drawings, dolls and songs about John Dillermand. At the 2021 Fastelavn festivities, John Dillermand was a popular choice of costume.

Catherine Bennett of The Guardian praised the series as something that British leaders could learn from. But the series' unusual premise was also criticized as pandering to pedophiles, or as making light of the #MeToo movement against sexual violence against women. A gender studies professor of Roskilde University, Christian Groes, criticized the series for its portrayal of a penis having its own force of will. Groes argues that this perpetuates stereotypical male humour which assumes it's the penis' force of will which gets a man into trouble, not the man's force of will - "This has been used to excuse a lot of bad behaviour from men."

The DR executive said that the series was part of DR's ambition to make "children's content that dares to tackle embarrassing, difficult, quirky and funny topics", that it was about being true to oneself and one's flaws, and that it acknowledged children's curiosity about human bodies. He said that the series was "as desexualized as it can possibly get", and that it was developed together with a child psychologist and other professionals who reviewed the scripts to ensure that children would not misinterpret what they saw.
