= Nanoq Media =

Media company based on Greenland

- Company type: Incentive
- Industry: Media
- Founded: 2002; Nuuk, Greenland
- Headquarters: Nuuk, Greenland

Nanoq Media is a company in Greenland, which runs a television station of the same name, as well as the Nanoq FM radio station. Nanoq Media is also a service provider of broadband internet and digital TV.

The television programming is in the Danish and Greenlandic languages.

== History ==
In January 1965, editor Jørgen Benzon and radio dealer Ole Winstedt began to find ways to introduce television to Greenland, specifically Nuuk (at the time Godthåb) for a three-year period. It was initially rejected, forcing Winstedt to form a closed-circuit service instead. The company started providing its services in May 1966 as Godthåb lukkede Telenet (Godthåb Closed-Circuit Television Network). In 1968, in order to give a formal greenlight, it needed 200 members to continue its viability. There were 100 subscribers at the time. It faced technical problems in 1969, especially since the relays of DR Television programmes constituted possible copyright infringement. With the passing of new legislation on 1 January 1970, the Godthåb TV (later renamed Nuuk TV) association was created. By 1973, some 2,000 families in Greenland had access to television.

In December 2000, it, alongside the Greenlandic Home Rule, Tele Greenland and KNR, took part in a digital TV study project. 50 subscribers were interested, if the results were positive, the digital service would be deployed. Nanoq Media began broadcasting a local channel on 1 August 2002, coinciding with the launch of its paid DTT service, which had 17 channels. On 1 August 2005, it began broadcasting DR 1 and DR 2. Rebroadcasts of the two channels' content was possible in the past, but not the full service due to copyright problems. This was solved thanks to new agreements with Copy-Dan and Koda. This broke KNR's de facto monopoly in Nuuk, which had 2,800 households connected to the service, out of a total of 5,000 households. Other associations would also obtain the two channels. TV 2 started broadcasting on 21 February 2008 after a long round of negotiations.

The launch of DR 1 and DR 2 on the Home Rule free-to-air package implied changes to the line-up. TV3, TV3 Puls and TV3 Sport 1 were added on 13 February 2013, while 3+, TV3 Sport 2 and TV2 Fri were added three-to-four weeks later. This implied the removal of DR 2, the live feeds of DR 1 and TV 2, 6'eren and DR Update, which was in the process of being shut down.

Subscription based digital terrestrial television is currently available in the capital Nuuk, Qaqortoq, Ilulissat and Qasigiannguit. Expansion beyond Nuuk started in 2015 with the start of services to Qaqortoq on 1 September, in association with Qaqortoq Digital. In April 2017, it llaunched in Ilulissat, in association with Ilulissat Digital, according to its manager "from 1 April, 4 April at latest". Plans for Aasiaat and Qasigiannguit were also on the cards. 4G-based internet services began on 1 September 2016 with Net1 as its strategic partner. The next day, it opened Nanoq FM, initially only available in Nuuk, but also planned an expansion to other cities where it already had its services.

== Services ==
Nanoq Media carries over 45 channels, including Nanoq Media Lokal. Danish and Scandinavian channels are available either live or time-shifted to adapt to the local timezone. Live feeds apply to entertainment (DR1, DR2, TV 2, TV3, Kanal 5, etc.), news (BBC News, TV 2 News) and sports channels (the two Eurosport channels, TV3's sports channels, TV 2 Sport and TV 2 Sport X). Two Norwegian (NRK1 and NRK2) and two Swedish channels (SVT1 and TV4) are available in the basic package. DR Ramasjang is not available. Subscribers are also eligible to join Viaplay, PlayMaker and TV 2 Play.

== See also ==
- Nanoq Media Lokal
