= Norlys =

Danish holding company

Norlys Holding A/S
- Type: Holding company
- Industry: Energy, telecommunications
- Predecessor: Eniig, SE
- Headquarters: Silkeborg, Denmark
- Area served: Denmark
- Key people: Gert Vinther Jørgensen (CEO)
- Products: Electricity, broadband, mobile services
- Owner: Norlys a.m.b.a.
- Number of employees: 4600
- Website: norlys.dk

Norlys, officially known as Norlys Holding A/S, is a Danish holding company owned by Norlys a.m.b.a. Its operations span the energy and telecommunications sectors. The company serves over 1.7 million customers and employs approximately 4,600 people. Norlys owns the fiber infrastructure company Norlys Fibernet and the electricity grid company N1.

== History ==
Norlys was established in 2020 through the merger of two telecom and energy companies, Eniig and SE, with Niels Duedahl as the CEO at the time.

In March 2022, Norlys sold 35% of its fiber network division to a French-Dutch investor consortium.

In April 2023, Norlys reached a preliminary agreement to acquire Telia's Danish business for approximately DKK 6 billion. The acquisition involves around 1.5 million Danish customer relationships. According to then-CEO Niels Duedahl, this move was part of Norlys' strategy to enter the mobile market.

The agreement between Norlys and Telia was subject to approval by Norlys' board of representatives and a thorough due diligence process during the first quarter of 2024.

As of April 2024, Telia Danmark has become part of Norlys and has been given a new legal name: Telia Mobil Danmark A/S, later renamed to Norlys Mobil A/S.

== Services ==
=== Digital Terrestrial Television ===
Norlys is involved in the operation of digital terrestrial television (DTT) in Denmark. As of June 2020, there are five national multiplexes in operation. Multiplex 1 is owned by DR and operated by Cibicom A/S, broadcasting free-to-air channels. Multiplexes 2 to 5 are owned and operated by Norlys, and carry encrypted pay-TV content.

In October 2021, the television provider Boxer was merged into Norlys, and the brand name was discontinued.

=== Internet services ===
Norlys is one of several internet service providers in Denmark, offering broadband and fiber services. Other major providers in the country include TDC, Telenor, Ewii, and Fastspeed.

=== Energy distribution ===
In the energy sector, Norlys operates through its subsidiary N1, which manages part of Denmark's electricity grid infrastructure.

== See also ==
- List of mobile network operators in Europe
