= TV Avisen =

- Country of origin: Denmark
- Original language: Danish

Production
- Running time: 15–30 minutes

Original release
- Network: DR1
- Release: 15 October 1965 – present

TV Avisen (English: TV Newspaper; also shortened to TVA) is a Danish television newscast produced by Danish public broadcaster DR.

== History ==
The first edition of TV Avisen was broadcast on 15 October 1965. – up until this point, television had already been broadcast regularly in Denmark for 14 years. This was due to an agreement signed between DR and the press in 1926 which guaranteed the press' control of the broadcast of news on television and radio. The agreement remained in place after the introduction of television and was rescinded on 1 July 1964.

Initially, TV Avisen mostly consisted of footage from foreign news agencies with a musical accompaniment in the style of a newsreel. The programme began broadcasting in colour on 2 October 1978. Five years later, the television news operation moved from its small studios at Radiohuset in Rosenørns Allé to TV-Byen in Gladsaxe.

In 1988, DR lost its monopoly on Danish television news when second government broadcaster TV2 (founded in 1988) began broadcasting its own news service. In an effort to compete, the main 19:30 programme was replaced in 1993 by two evening bulletins at 18:00 and 20:30. The following year, the programmes were moved half an hour later to 18:30 and 21:00.

The morning edition of TV Avisen, DR Morgen, began in 2001 and ended in 2006 due to low viewing figures.

In 2004, TV Avisen changed to a new design and logo created by Front Nordic, which won a silver Promax Award for Best News Design in the World.

In 2006, the television, radio and online operations of DR were combined in the new DR Byen complex in Copenhagen. TV Avisen received a new design, also from Front Nordic, and began broadcasting in 16:9 widescreen. In 2012, the late evening programme was moved to 21:30 on Monday – Thursday nights.

On 13 June 2017, TV Avisen was rebranded with updated titles and a new studio design. The programme was rebranded again in 2023, alongside the launch of a dedicated 24-hour online news channel, TVA Live.

== Current broadcasting times ==
- Daily at 07:00, (weekend 08:00) 12:00, 18:30
- Daily (except Saturday) at 21:00

== Features ==
TV Avisen always begins with a short summary of the news. The top story tends to concern a Danish issue. TV Avisen has its own permanent correspondents in Washington DC, New York City, Rome, Brussels, China and the Middle East, as well as a special climate correspondent.

As is usual for Danish television, reports which contain foreign languages (for example interviews with foreign politicians or foreign press conferences) are not dubbed in Danish, but subtitled.

== TVA Live ==
TVA Live
- Country: Denmark
- Broadcast area: Worldwide

Programming
- Language: Danish
- Picture format: 16:9 HD

Ownership
- Owner: Danmarks Radio

History
- Launched: 6 September 2023

Links
- Webcast: https://www.dr.dk/drtv/kanal/tva-live_192099

TVA Live is a running online livestream of TV Avisen editions, which usually broadcasts either simulcasts of or repeats of the recentmost editions to have aired on DR1 or DR2. The livestream runs 24 hours a day. In contrast to the other 3 channels on DR TV, TVA Live is not geo-blocked on the service.

It is DR's second news-specific channel behind DR Update that operated from 2007 and 2013.

== See also ==
- Lone Zilstorff
