= DR3 =

- Country: Denmark
- Broadcast area: Danish Realm
- Headquarters: DR Byen; Copenhagen, Denmark

Programming
- Language: Danish
- Picture format: 16:9 720p (HDTV)

Ownership
- Owner: DR
- Sister channels: DR1; DR2; DR K DR Ramasjang; DR Ultra

History
- Launched: 28 January 2013; 13 years ago (as a TV channel); 2 January 2020; 6 years ago (Online)
- Replaced: DR HD
- Closed: 2 January 2020 (as a TV channel); 5 April 2022 (as an online streaming service)
- Replaced by: DR P3

Availability

DR3 was a Danish national television channel, produced by the public service broadcaster, DR. It focused on sport, comedy, science, music, documentary and fiction. The channel launched on 28 January 2013, replacing DR HD.

DR3 programming is directed towards the young and young adult audience, between 15 and 39 years old. The channel airs at least one film each evening, not rarely American comedy, thriller-comedy and action. Series like Vikings, The Knick, Ripper Street and Black Sails has been aired on DR3, and so have X-game sports and even computer games like championships in Counterstrike. The channel doesn't air news. Documentaries are mostly of technical type, for instance "Mayday, Air Disaster" and "Ice Road Truckers".

== History ==
In 2017, a DR study showed that 27% of the viewers of the 20-39 demographic was no longer watching linear TV regularly. This shift caused the broadcaster to consider ending the channel.

In 2018, DR announced that from 2020 three DR channels were to cease linear broadcasts, with two moving entirely online (DR3 and DR Ultra) and the other (DR K) merged, to cut 20% of its budget. On January 2, 2020, DR3 ceased broadcasting as an open television service, and is instead offered as an online-only service.

From April 5, 2022, DR3 merged with its sister youth-oriented radio station, DR P3.

== Logos and identities ==
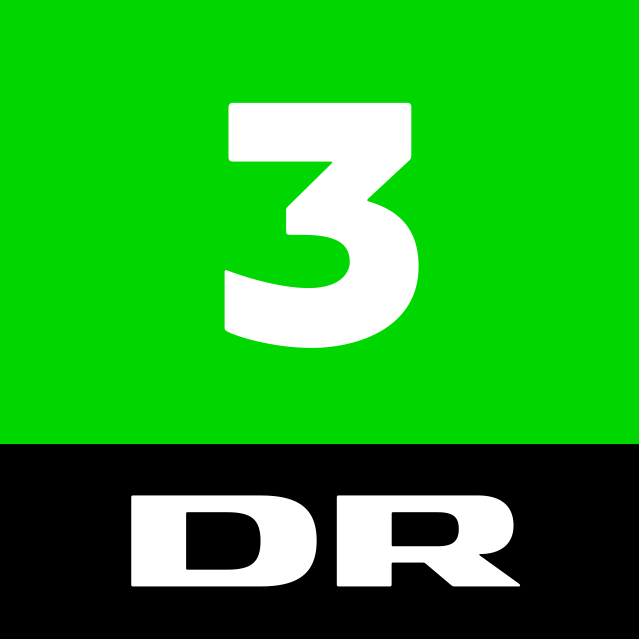
DR3's logo from 28 January 2013 to 2020

Stacked version of DR3's second logo, which was used until January 2015.

== Programmes aired on DR3 ==
=== Original programming ===
- Absurdistan
- De uperfekte
- Du lyver!
- Fuckr med dn hjrne
- Generation SoMe!
- Gift Ved Første Blik (Later moved to DR1; Remade in the US, UK, Australia, France and Spain as Married at First Sight)
- Hobby-TV
- HomoLesbians
- Jeg er ambassadøren (Documentary on Rufus Gifford, United States Ambassador to Denmark 2013–2017)
- Monte Carlo elsker (A spin-off of the Monte Carlo radio show on DR P3)
- Musik Dok - Kidd Life
- Petra dater hele verden
- Prinsesser fra blokken
- Storm i et glas vand
- Thomas Skovs sportsprogram
- Den utrolige historie om Alexander Blomqvist

=== Imports ===
- 30 Rock
- Family Guy
- Girls
- Glee
- James May's Man Lab
- Late Night with Jimmy Fallon
- Parks and Recreation
- Rookie Blue
- Sherlock
- Skam
- The Graham Norton Show
- The Walking Dead
- Haven
- Vikings
- The X Factor
