= Sisimiut TV =

Sisimiut TV is a local television station from the city of Sisimiut in Greenland. It produces local television programmes and distributes them to KNR1 via a sharing agreement initiated in 2016.

== History ==
The TV association was founded on 1 February 1971, at a time when there was still no official television station in Greenland.

In 2002, it, alongside Nuuk TV received a permit from Tele-Post to broqdcast a digital subscription service using the DVB-T standard.

The Press Council of Greenland criticised Sisimiut TV's filming of a room in the city's medical clinic in May that year, which was done without the consent of the clinic.

In 2009, Palle Lennert (director since 2006) resigned; the station's entrance only showed closure messages for either sickness or other reasons, while hiding the real reason. The company was fixing its dire economical situation, but certain documents were lost and the administrative council was dissolved. Three former members attempted to revive it. The 300 subscribers had to suspend their actions on the channel and were calling for a new meeting by September. Their website contained references to the encrypted package, which included TV 2 Zulu, but the encrypted channels weren't working for a month. With its directive sacked, the company in September rejected a proposal from the mainland Danish operations of Canal Digital to pay its DKK 1,65 million in debt. Sisimiut TV was on the verge of bankruptcy. Simon Olsen took over the role of president in late October and announced a plan to remove its debt of upwards of DKK 4 million. The signals from Canal Digital were expected to be restored on 28 October.
