= Lone Zilstorff =

Lone Zilstorff (1948–2014) was a Danish news anchor.

== Biography ==
She became a journalist apprentice in Vestkysten in Esbjerg at the age of eighteen. In 1979 she moved to Danmarks Radio. She became known as a reporter for TV Avisen in the 1980s, later moving up as anchor of TV Avisen and Søndagsmagasinet in 1988.

From 1990 to 1993 she was a chief information officer in Danmarks Turistråd and the Royal Danish Theatre. Returning to DR in the period 1993 to 2000, she was a news editor and subeditor for TV Avisen. The segments Nyhedstimen and Horisont were established during her time as news editor. After 2000 she taught journalism at the University of Southern Denmark and Copenhagen Business School, released the novel Kvinderne i Klithuset in 2004, and worked for Kræftens Bekæmpelse. She contracted lung cancer herself, and died in November 2014. Zilstorff was the mother of Nina Munch-Perrin, who also anchored TV Avisen.
