= DR Ultra =

Defunct Danish children's television channel

- DR Ultra's logo since 2020
- Country: Kingdom of Denmark
- Broadcast area: Nationwide, Danish Realm
- Headquarters: Aarhus, Denmark

Programming
- Language: Danish
- Picture format: 16:9 576i (SDTV)

Ownership
- Owner: DR
- Sister channels: DR1; DR2; DR3; DR K DR Ramasjang

History
- Launched: 4 March 2013; 13 years ago
- Replaced: DR Update
- Closed: 1 January 2020

Links
- Website: www.dr.dk/ultra

Availability

Terrestrial
- DTT: Channel 7

Streaming media
- DR TV: Watch live
- YouSee: Watch live
- Zattoo: Watch live

DR Ultra is a streaming platform for children aged 9–14, produced by the public service broadcaster, DR. The channel launched in 2013 as a national television channel. In 2020, it transitioned away from traditional broadcast to be available only via DR's streaming service, DRTV.

== History ==
=== Linear channel ===
The channel launched on 4 March 2013, replacing DR Update. It was initially targeted at the 7–12 year-old demographic. The station aired daily from 6:00 am to 9:00 pm. DR Ultra was based in Aarhus, along with DR's other channel broadcasting children's television series, DR Ramasjang.

DR Ultra's logo from 2017 to 2020

Ultra Nyt was the channel's kid-friendly news programme, presented by Inge Thorup and Jonas Madsen, among others. Other programmes included the game show Kvit eller dobbelt, a children's spin-off of a historic game show that had been carried for four times between the 1950s and the 1990s, which was a Danish adaptation of The $64,000 Question. Gepetto News also aired on the network, though with less frequency.

=== Streaming channel ===
In 2015, DR's general director, Maria Rørbye Rønn, wrote in a column that the 7–12 demographic was watching Disney Channel, YouTube and Netflix more than DR Ultra. Rørbye Rønn emphasized that the platform needed to increasingly engage with its young viewers digitally in order to remain relevant. As a result of cost-cutting measures at DR approved in 2018, the channel was set to close in 2020. DR Ultra was subsequently replaced by an online channel on its streaming service, DRTV. The linear channel closed on 2 January 2020 alongside DR3 and DR K.

Following the channel's shift to being available online-only, its target audience changed from 7–12 to 9–14 year-olds. Previously, the age demographics targeted by DR's two children's programming channels had been split by the age children entered school; school-age children were the target audience of DR Ultra and younger children were the audience for DR Ramasjang. At the time of the shift to online broadcasting the head of DR Ramasjang and Ultra, Morten Skov Hansen, argued that the shift children make into a school environment was no longer as significant as the age at which children begin interacting with the digital world. Therefore, the age-split between the two platforms now reflects the age at which children typically gain access to social media and the internet, typically between the ages of 8 and 9.

In 2020, the channel's programm Ultra smider tøjet (lit. 'Ultra strips down') received international attention and criticism for showing naked adult bodies to children. In the program, children aged 11–13 were in the audience as adults of different ages and body types were presented without clothing. The children were then encouraged to ask the adults questions in an effort to promote body positivity. Critics of the program, including Danish politician Peter Skaarup, argue that it was too "vulgar" in its approach to educating children. Others applauded the Ultra smider tøjet for encouraging children to be comfortable with themselves and not shy away from taboo subjects.
