= Matilde Kimer =

Danish journalist

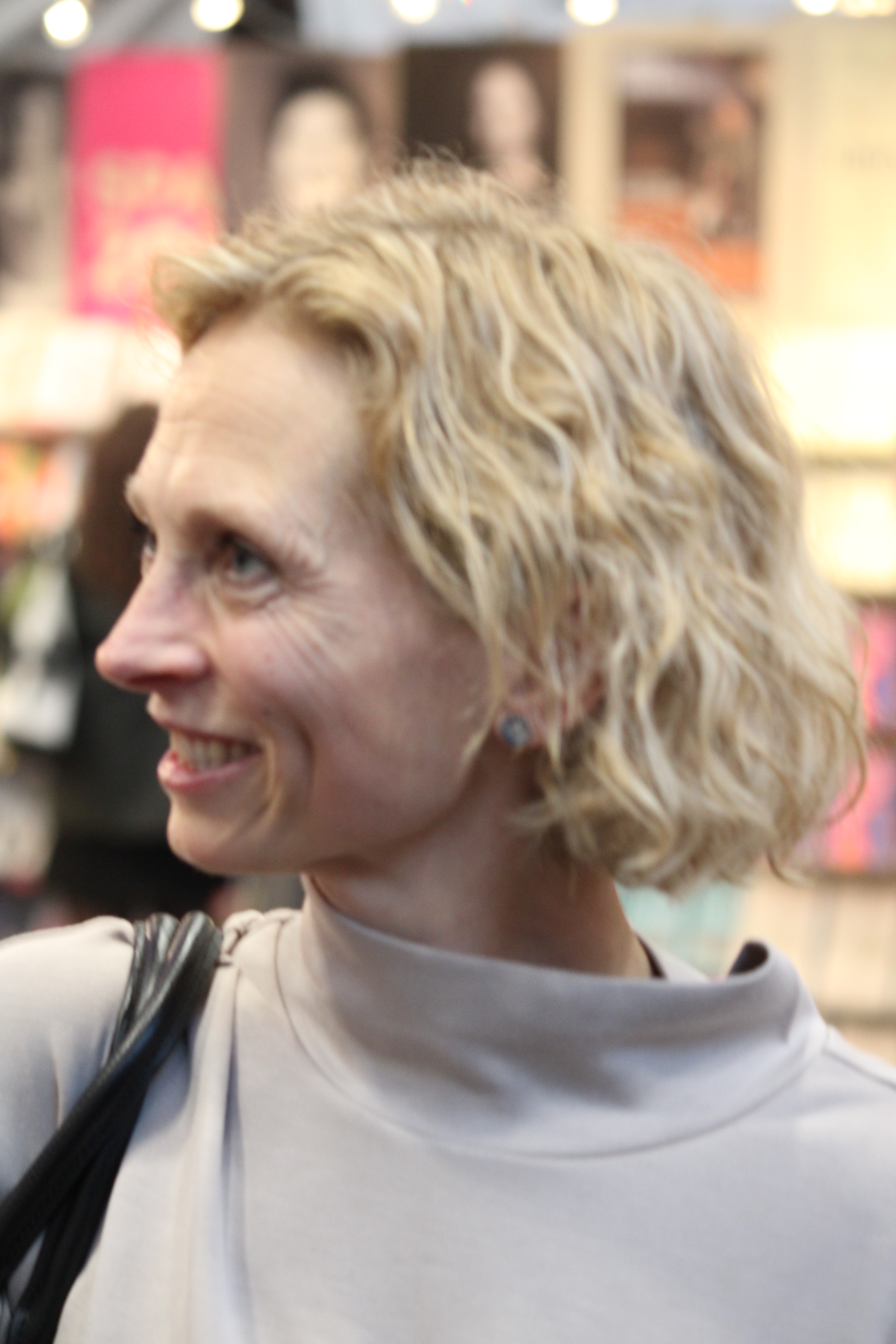
Kimer in 2025

Matilde Kimer (born in Korsør on 23 December 1980) is a Danish journalist working as a foreign correspondent for Danmarks Radio (DR). She is known for her reports on the Russian-Ukrainian war and has received numerous awards for her work in the field.

== Context and education ==
Matilde Kimer studied Russian in St. Petersburg in 2002 and continued her Russian studies in Denmark. She attended Askov High School, and studied Russian language and literature at the University of Southern Denmark, in parallel with her training as a journalist, completed in 2007.

== Career ==
Matilde Kimer has been associated with DR since 2005, and after 2014 she mainly reported from Russia and Ukraine as correspondent. Among other things, Kimer covered the war in Ukraine and published the book 'The War Within'. Kimer has participated several times in 'Deadline' on issues concerning Russia and Eastern Europe as a whole.

In August 2022, she was expelled from Russia for a period of 10 years until 2032. The reason has not been revealed, but DR suspects it is related to the Russian Federation government's attempt to suppress press coverage of the Russian invasion of Ukraine that same year. In August 2022, she was deprived of her press accreditation in Ukraine.

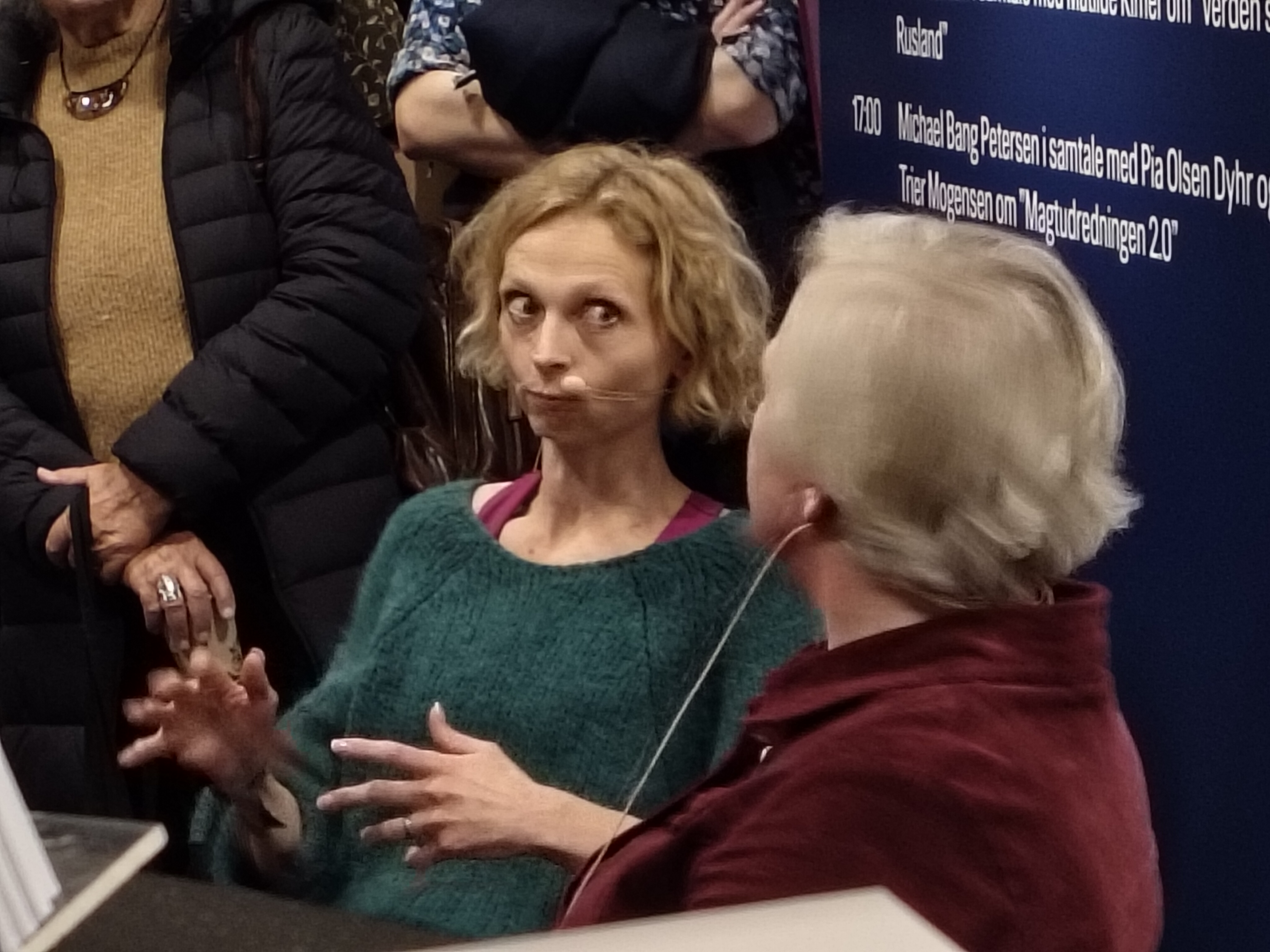
Kimer speaking with Tine Roesen at Bogforum 2025 in Copenhagen

Kimer had lymph node cancer at the age of 14 and spoke about her illness in several interviews. She is married to video editor Jesper Schwartz, by whom she has three children. From 2020 to 2022, she was a permanent resident in Moscow.

== Prizes ==
Matilde Kimer received the DR Language Prize in 2015. In January 2017, Kimer received the Berlingske Fonds Journalist award for her coverage of the war in and around Ukraine.
