= 7P =

7P may refer to:

7P

- 7P/Pons-Winnecke, comet
- Batavia Air, IATA-Code, Indonesian Airline
- 7p, an arm of Chromosome 7 (human)
- 7P, a Classification of steam locomotives by British Railways, denoting a locomotive rated for the largest of passenger trains
- 7P, the production code for the 1989 Doctor Who serial Survival

7Ps

- Seven Ps marketing terminology
- Seven P's, a United States military acronym

== See also ==
- P7 (disambiguation)
