= Internet in Denmark =

- Total next generation access: 73%
- Rural next generation access: 3%
- DOCSIS 3 access: 61%
- VDSL access: 21%
- FTTP access: 43%
- 4G/LTE access: 65%
- Median speed downstream (Note: "Median speed" defined as the median speed which the consumers choose to purchase the rights to use from the ISP. Not to be confused with the median maximum available speed. All speeds are as marketed by the ISP. In the case of xDSL these have a tendency to be overstated compared to achievable speeds for the end user.): 20,4 Mbit/s
- Median speed upstream: 1,9 Mbit/s
- Investment per household: $457
- 2012 price 12-30 Mbit/s: $23.40
- Year: 2012

In an international context Denmark is viewed as a somewhat peculiar country when it comes to internet access. The former state owned telephone company TDC owns the entire last mile infrastructure in terms of copper telephone lines and the vast majority of the coaxial cable infrastructure as well. Even though the Danish telecommunications infrastructure is very heavily dominated by one company, Danish internet customers still enjoy fair prices and a wide availability of different next generation access internet connections in comparison with most other EU countries. Furthermore, TDCs de facto monopoly on last mile infrastructure has come under attack. In the last decade regional power companies have formed national business alliances aimed at implementing FTTH for private and business end users.

In 2012, Denmark was ranked third by OECD in terms of wired broadband subscriptions per 100 inhabitants (see the bar chart below). The same year 99,9 % of all households and companies were able to connect to the internet via a broadband connection of at least 2 Mbit/s. As of 2015, 1.3 million Danish households are connected to the internet via TDC's coax and fiber, all of whom will soon have the opportunity to receive one gigabit per second connection.

In 2012, Denmark performed poorly in terms of next generation access in rural areas compared to several other countries in the EU and the US.

== History ==
In May 1985, The Nordic Council of Ministers granted 9.2 million NOK (roughly the equivalent of £1 million) to a Nordic university network, named NORDUnet. At the same time, the Nordic telecommunication companies created a joint company providing one-stop shopping for inter-Nordic lines called Scantele, running on a 64 kbit/s line which made it easy to create NORDUnet. In 1988 NORDUnet became operational and connected to the American National Science Foundation Network (NSFnet) via a 56 kbit/s satellite line to the John von Neumann Center at Princeton University, New Jersey, and then on to the NSFnet which itself had only initiated operations in 1986 using the TCP/IP standard.

Besides the US's NSFnet (which was the immediate forerunner of the Internet), the NORDUnet was also connected to a similar European network such as the European Academic and Research Network (EARN) which again connected to different National research and education networks.

Around the same time as the establishing of NORDUnet, Denmark established its own national research and education network called Danish Network for Research and Education (also known as DeIC), which became operational in 1987, thus connecting the research departments of several Danish universities with one another and the world via NORDUnet.

In 1994, the Danish Internet Exchange Point (DIX) was set up to facilitate easy communication between different Internet service providers (ISPs).

Denmark's first broadband connections for households were offered as Internet over cable television by the country's second-largest cable TV provider Stofa in 1996, to a single town – three years before the first ADSL products were offered (see xDSL section below). In 1998 Stofa started a general roll-out to other cities and towns. At the end of 2000, Denmark's largest cable TV provider TDC launched a similar product.

By 2021 92.47% of Denmark's households were reported to have access to broadband internet.

== xDSL ==
ADSL was introduced commercially to Denmark in 1999 by the then 4-year-old company Cybercity. TDC launched its own ADSL products the following year and quickly became the dominant ADSL company

In 2005 a new company Fullrate established itself as a low cost ISP and managed to obtain a market share of 4,1 percent between 2005 and 2009. Fullrate concentrated its broadband products on urban areas of more than 12.000 inhabitants and ADSL2+ technology. Fullrate was bought by TDC in 2008.

TDC launched its first VDSL2 products in June 2007 but until 2011 the countrywide VDSL2 coverage was nonetheless no greater than 2% only achieving 21% by the year 2012.

As of the end of 2012, TDC controlled 74% of the Danish xDSL market and roughly about half of all internet connections were based on xDSL technology. As of 2013 98% of all house holds and companies were able to access a xDSL connection of at least 2 Mbit/s downstream.

== Mobile broadband ==
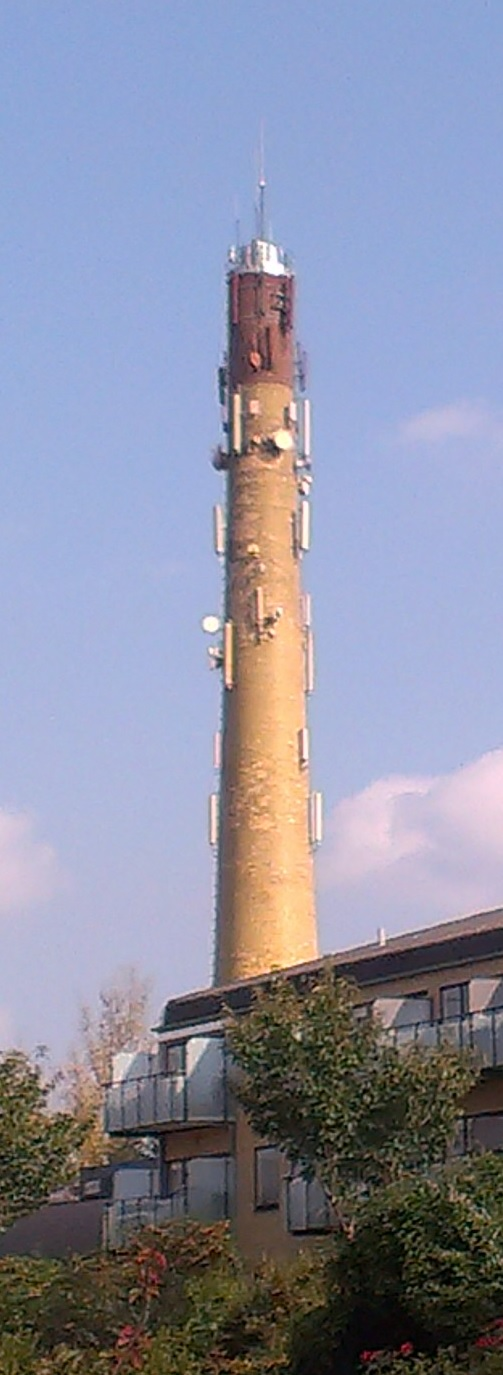
A Danish chimney with 3G and 4G (LTE) antennas attached to it

In stark contrast to the infrastructure of cable based internet connections the Danish mobile broadband infrastructure is owned by four different telephone companies (3, Telenor, Norlys and TDC) and divided into 3 independent networks (Norlys and Telenor share a joint mobile network) each with countrywide 2G coverage and close to countrywide 3G coverage. Competition is fierce and best described as an all out price war which commentators (such as ComputerWorld.dk) and the industry itself alike has characterized as unsustainable in the long run.

4G has as of 2012 only achieved 65% coverage. Per terms of several government public spectrum auctionings of 4G licenses more than 99% of the Danish population must be covered by at least a 10 Mbit/s 4G service by 2015.

== FTTP ==
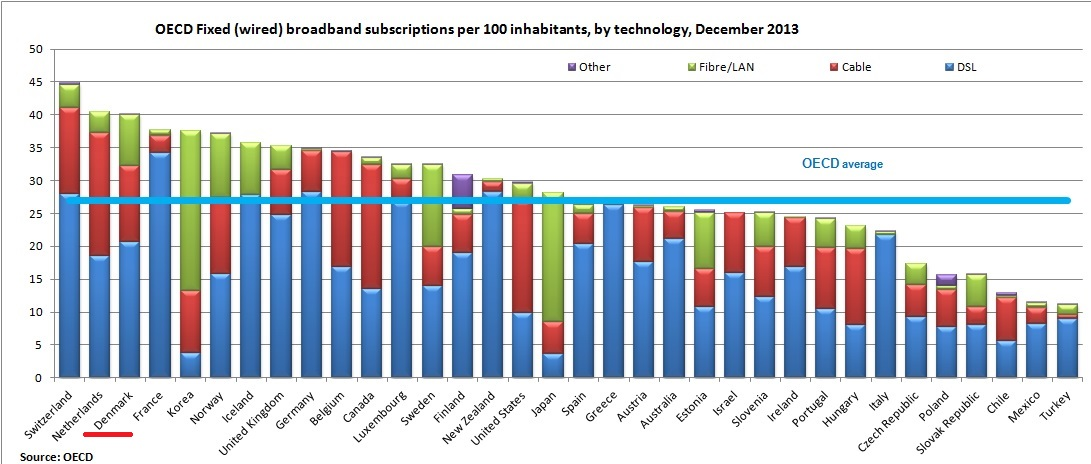
OECD countries fixed (wired) broadband subscriptions per 100 inhabitants, by technology, December 2013. Notice Denmark's third place and the mix of different technologies

The traditional telephone companies have historically shown little to no interest in implementing fiber to the premises (FTTP). In 2005 this led 14 local and regional power companies to invest around 1 billion pounds between 2005 and 2013 in building a FTTP infrastructure from scratch. The power companies usually roll out fiber optic cables when they need to dig in an area due to works on subterranean power cables.

=== Sale of DONG Energy's FTTH network ===
The biggest of these power companies – the state-owned DONG Energy – did, however, sell its entire consumer-facing fiber optic network to TDC in 2009 and exited the ISP market. This left the capital city of Copenhagen and a vast area north of Copenhagen without any power company to coordinate a roll-out of FTTH with works on subterranean power cables. Since the purchase of DONG Energy's fiber optic network, the roll-out of FTTH in the Copenhagen area has practically been ignored by TDC and left to a few small companies focusing on a small number of clients. Even though the fiber optic cables were in the ground TDC emphasized the marketing of fiber optic products to the extent of not mentioning it as a product on its own webpage. Furthermore, fiber optic connections were downgraded to asymmetric speeds resembling that of VDSL2. In 2012 TDC responded to the criticism by stating that "the Danes don't care about fiber optics". TDC also emphasized that the company did use the fiber optics network it had purchased from DONG Energy, but usually as a backbone for its VDSL2 products.

In the meantime the remaining 13 local and regional power companies have managed to build up a customer base of more than 250.000 house holds and as of 2013 43% of all Danish households had access to FTTH. The biggest FTTP player is FIBIA.

== DOCSIS ==
As of 2013, DOCSIS 3 (Data Over Cable Service Interface Specification) contributed more than any other technology to Denmark's next generation access (NGA) coverage, 63% of all households are able to access a DOCSIS connection and 62% of all households are able to access a DOCSIS 3 connection. While DOCSIS 3 has the same availability as xDSL in the major cities it is close to nonexistent in the rural areas. TDC controls 66% of the market for DOCSIS connections via its subsidiary company YouSee while the second-largest market share of around 10% is controlled by Stofa, which was purchased in 2014 by the biggest FTTH company S.E (abbreviation for Southern Energy). S.E has referred to the purchase of Stofa as a direct attempt to challenge TDC's dominant position in the cable TV and DOCSIS market.

Due to TDC's very dominant position, The Danish Business Authority has ordered TDC to open its coaxial network to other competitors since 2009. This has however not brought any new competitors to compete with TDC on DOCSIS 3 connections; this is because TDC has set up its system in such a way that any customer has to buy regular cable TV from TDC before the customer can purchase any DOCSIS 3 connection from a competitor. In 2014, The Danish Business Authority started taking steps towards new regulation demanding that TDC should open its coaxial network in terms of both cable TV and DOCSIS 3 to arbitrage competitors.

== WiMAX ==
Until 2009, Clearwire operated a somewhat countrywide WiMAX (Worldwide Interoperability for Microwave Access) network with about 10,000 customers. After the bankruptcy of Clearwire's Danish subsidiary its customers were taken over by the WiMAX ISP Skyline which already had its own customer base of around 10.000 - mostly situated in Jutland and Funen. From 2009-2012 Skyline's customer base grew to about 40,000 subscribers, however Skyline filed for bankruptcy on 10 May 2012 saying that the development of 4G services along with falling market prices had made it unsustainable for the company to continue its enterprise. As of 2014, the small 10-man company AirNet operated a scattered but growing WiMAX network focusing on rural areas with poor or no broadband access and offering speeds of up to 20/2 Mbit/s down- and upstream, respectively.

== Internet censorship ==
According to the OpenNet Initiative there is "no evidence" that Denmark is censoring its citizens internet access in terms of political content, social content, conflict and security content or web sites that provide internet tools (such as e-mail, internet hosting, search, translation etc.) A high court did however order the Danish ISPs to block the sites The Pirate Bay and AllOfMP3 in a 2008 civil lawsuit on the grounds of copyrights infringements.

== List of Internet Service Providers ==
Major providers:

- 3 (Mobile broadband only)
- Ewii
- Fastspeed
- Norlys
- TDC (Former incumbent, state-owned; includes YouSee, dktv, etc.)
- Telenor

Other notable providers:

- Globalconnect – Joint business customer front for 16 local Danish power companies, including S.E; FTTP only
- Waoo – Joint customer front for 15 local Danish power companies, not including S.E; FTTH only
- Wizer – First Danish ISP to offer private households 5000/5000 Mbit/s via TDC's wholesale fibernet infrastructure

== Web browsers ==
As of 2024, most used web browsers according to Statcounter were:

Web browser	Market share	Reference
Chrome	61%	
Safari	23%	
Edge	8.8%	
Firefox	3.1%	
Samsung Internet	1.6%	
Opera	1.6%	
Explorer	0.09%	
Android	0.09%	
Yandex Browser	0.06%	
other	0.21%	

As of 2024, most used web browsers according to Cloudflare were:

Web browser	Market share	Reference
Chrome	48%	
Safari	28%	
Edge	12%	
Firefox	6.7%	
Samsung Internet	2.1%	
Opera	1.0%	
Brave	0.71%	
DuckDuckGo Private Browser	0.23%	
Yandex Browser	0.11%	
Avast Secure Browser	0.04%	
AVG Secure Browser	0.04%	
