= Kalaallit Nunaata Radioa =

Public broadcasting organization of Greenland

- Type: Public-service radio and television broadcaster
- Country: Kingdom of Denmark
- Availability: Greenland
- Owner: Government of Greenland
- Key people: Karl-Henrik Simonsen, Director General
- Launch date: 1958 (founded); 1 November 1982 (television)
- Official website: www.knr.gl/kl

Kalaallit Nunaata Radioa (KNR; lit. 'Greenland's Radio'; officially rendered into English as the Greenlandic Broadcasting Corporation) is Greenland's national public broadcasting organization.

Based in the territory's capital, Nuuk, KNR is an independent state-owned corporation headed by a five-person board. Its activities are funded from a mixture of sources, mainly direct government funding but also limited on-air advertising.

In 2012–13, all elements of KNR Radio and TV relocated to a new building in Nuuk. The broadcasts come from various sources, including Naalakkersuisut (the Greenland government), various associations, collaborations with private local broadcasters and broadcasts abroad, especially DR. KNR is an associate member of Nordvision, an association of state broadcasters in the Nordic countries.

As of April 2022, a fifth of KNR's positions are vacant due to low salaries; the station has had to reduce its internet and radio reporting.

== Services ==
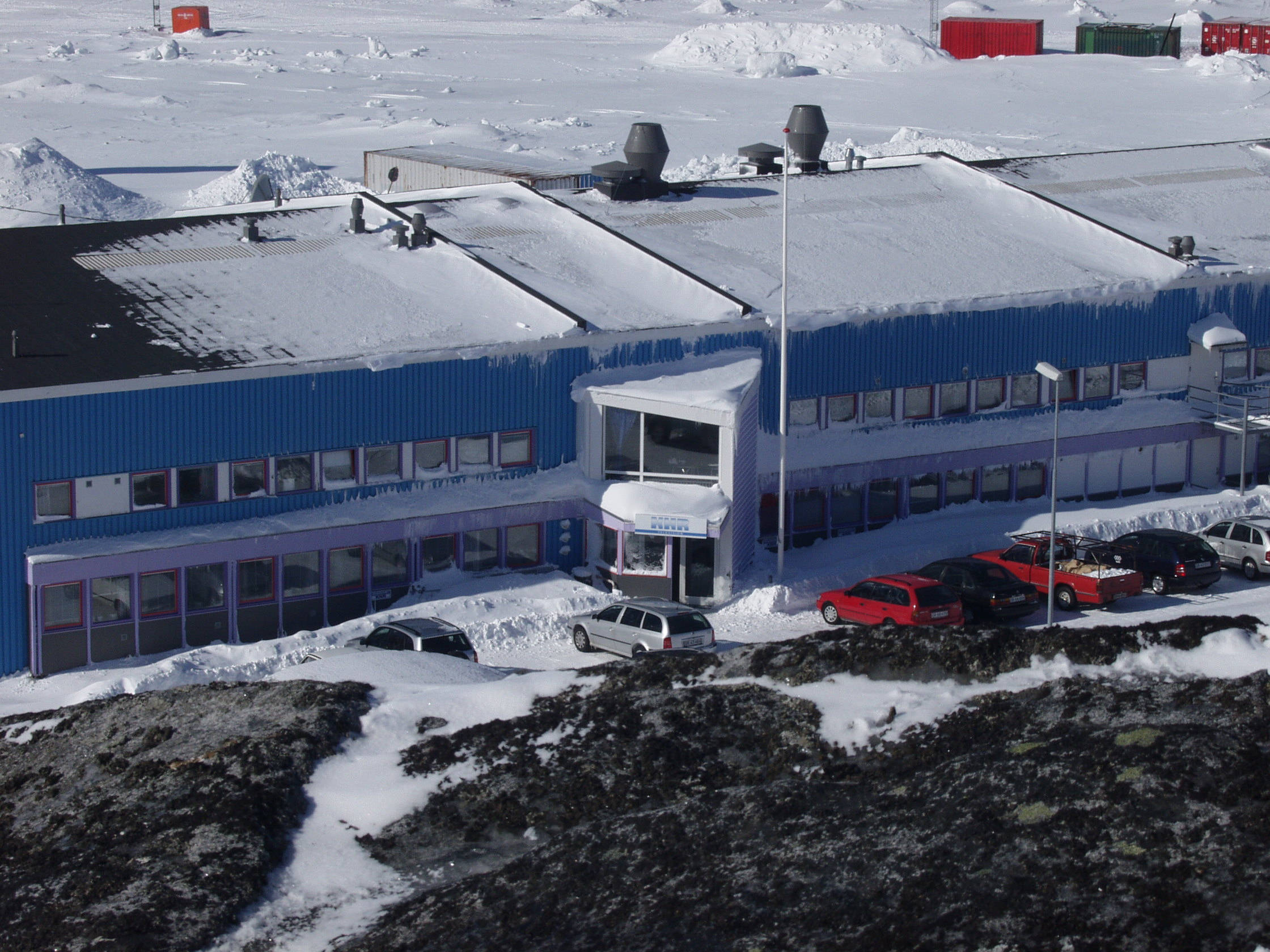
KNR's former headquarters in Nuuk

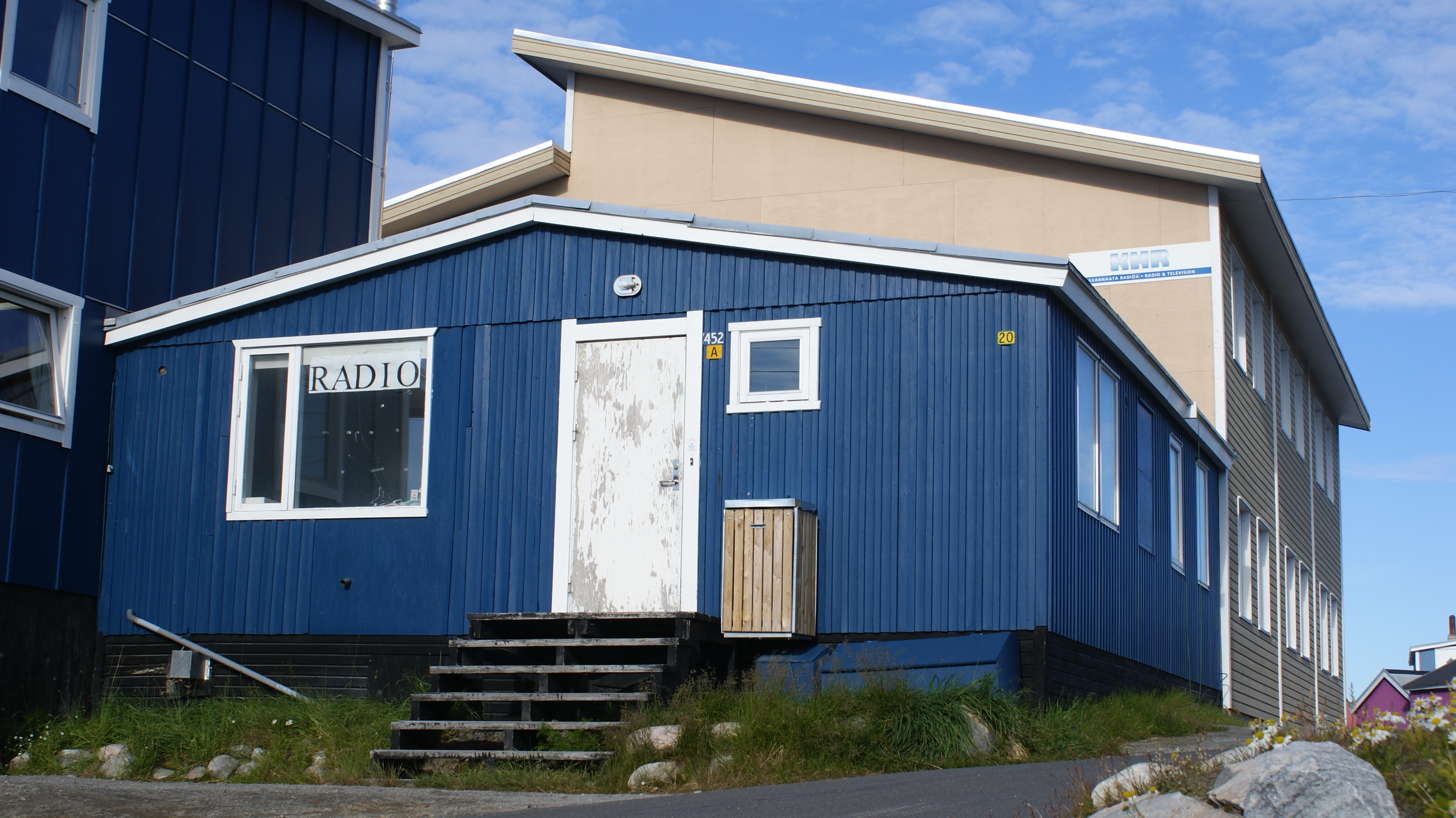
Former KNR station in Ilulissat

=== Television ===
KNR offers two channels nationwide, KNR1 and KNR2. They are available via digital terrestrial television (DVB-T), and digital cable television (DVB-C). Both channels are also streamed online via YouTube.

KNR1 is the primary channel and most of its programming is in the Greenlandic language (Kalaallisut). KNR2 goes on air only to broadcast live from specific events.

In 2006, KNR TV installed a complete digital SD-SDI production and editing facility with the infrastructure needed to provide for the local production of talk shows, news, and remote broadcasts.

Prior to January 2013, KNR1 also featured programming from Danish television networks DR and TV 2 but when several of DR's channels were made free-to-air in Greenland, KNR decided to focus on original Greenlandic programming.

On 21 June 2020, both KNR1 and KNR2 switched to 720p HD resolution.

=== Radio ===
The KNR radio station broadcasts nationwide. It is available on FM, AM, and online. It broadcasts mainly in the Greenlandic language but some programming is also in Danish.

In Nuuk, KNR also provides a direct relay of DR P1 via FM.
