= DR P7 Mix =

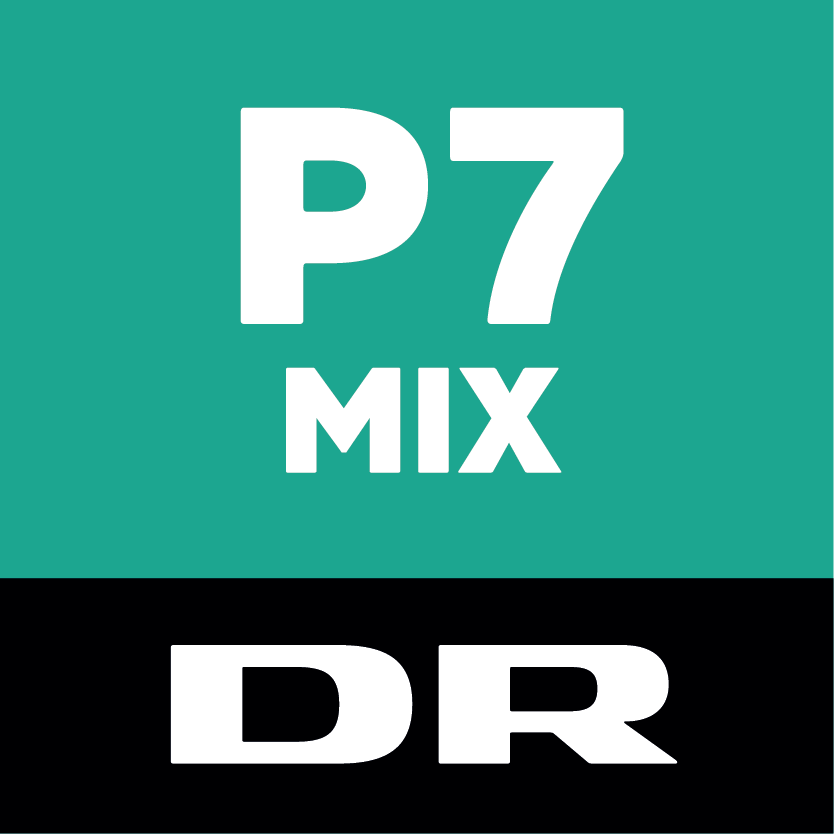
- Denmark
- Broadcast area: Denmark – Nationally via Digital Audio Broadcasting (DAB)
- Frequency: DAB+: MUX2

Programming
- Language: Danish
- Format: Multi-formatted

Ownership
- Owner: DR
- Operator: DR

History
- First air date: June 6, 2011; 14 years ago
- Last air date: 2 January 2020; 3:00 local time

Links
- Webcast: Web Stream; HTTP progressive Streams: (Shoutcast, 92 Kbps MP3); (Shoutcast, 192 Kbps MP3); HLS Streams: (192 Kbps AAC)
- Website: www.dr.dk/p7mix

DR P7 Mix was one of DR's digital radio stations in Denmark. It launched on 6 June 2011 as the third of five new digital-only stations. On September 2019, the station was slated for closure.

== History ==
In November 2010, DR announced it would significantly lower the number of digital radio stations in its line-up from 23 to between 10-12. The new line-up of digital stations were announced in January 2011. In the new line-up, DR Hit and DR Soft were to be replaced by P7 Mix which unlike the former channels would have presenters.

On 1 October 2017 P7 Mix became available on DAB+ radio when a nationwide switch-over took place.

== Presenters ==
- Christina Bjørn
- Christine Milton
- Henrik Milling
- Jonas Gülstorff
- Michael Bernhard
- Mikkel Bagger
- Nicolai Molbech
- Sandie Westh
