= Nanoq Media Lokal =

Nanoq Media Lokal is a Greenlandic television channel. The local TV channel features news programs, lectures, music and other local events.

The channel was launched in 2002, coinciding with the launch of its digital service.

On 20 October 2017, it suspended its nightly news service as part of a cost-cutting plan. From early November, it would compensate the loss by premiering Nutaarsiassat Tunulequtaat (Context of the News), an in-depth analysis of events. The channel started broadcasting a five-day service on 1 May 2018. The news bulletins (18:45 and 19:15) would now be seen in hourly repeats on weeknights.

== See also ==
- Nanoq Media
