= DR Ramasjang =

Danish children's television channel

- Country: Denmark
- Broadcast area: Danish Realm
- Headquarters: Aarhus, Denmark

Programming
- Language: Danish
- Picture format: 16:9 576i (SDTV)

Ownership
- Owner: DR
- Sister channels: DR1; DR2

History
- Launched: 1 November 2009; 16 years ago

Availability

Streaming media
- DR TV: www.dr.dk/drtv/kanal/20892 (only in EU and EEA)

DR Ramasjang is a Danish public television channel owned by DR which targets children aged 3–13.

The channel takes its name from the Danish word ramasjang, which refers to a loud or festive uproar, similar to the English hullabaloo.

== History ==
DR presented their idea to launch a channel for children in 2005 in preparation for the new media settlement of 2006. When the settlement was presented in June 2006, the plan was for the children's channel to broadcast in the daytime while a history channel would broadcast in the evening. In preparation for the launch of the new channel, DR concentrated its division for children's programs, DR B&U, on Aarhus. Signe Lindkvist, who had participated in many children's programs, was appointed channel editor in 2008. By then, it had been decided that the children's channel and the historical channel would get separate channel spaces.

The name of the channel was revealed in March 2009. The channel would broadcast between 5 am and 8 pm every day of the year. It would target children between 3 and 10 years old, with a special focus on those between 7 and 10. The channel launched on 1 November 2009, and is available on digital terrestrial television and satellite television and is considered a must-carry channel for cable networks.

A wide variety of Danish and foreign programs air on the channel, including movies such as Kiki den lille heks and special events such as the MGP and MGP Nordic. All foreign programs, such as Barbapapa and Gurli Gris, are shown dubbed into Danish.

In 2021, the channel received controversy over the unusual premise of the claymation children's series John Dillermand.

The idea of the historical channel was scrapped, and instead, rewinding footage of the hosts sleeping, with a message saying "DR Ramasjang will wake up in (time) hours and (time) minutes," was used.

== Radio station ==
DR operated a radio station with the same name from 1 November 2009 to 31 December 2014.
