= DR1 =

Danish public television channel

- Logo used since 2020
- Country: Denmark
- Broadcast area: Danish Realm
- Headquarters: DR Byen; Copenhagen, Denmark

Programming
- Language: Danish
- Picture format: 16:9 720p (HDTV)

Ownership
- Owner: DR
- Sister channels: DR2; DR Ramasjang

History
- Launched: 2 October 1951; 75 years ago
- Former names: Statsradiofonien TV (1951–1959), Danmarks Radio TV (1959–1964), DR TV (1964–1996)

Availability

Terrestrial
- DTT: Channel 1
- Televarpiđ (Faroe Islands): Channel 3

Streaming media
- DR TV: Watch live (only in EU and EEA)

DR1 (DR Et) is the flagship television channel of the Danish Broadcasting Corporation (DR). It became Denmark's first television station when it began broadcasting in 1951 – at first only for an hour a day, three times a week.

Besides its productions, the channel also broadcasts co-productions with other Nordic countries through Nordvision and numerous programmes from English-speaking countries like the United States, United Kingdom, and Australia, all in the original language with Danish subtitles. Its news programme is called TV Avisen.

== History ==
Statsradiofonien Fjernsyn started broadcasts on 2 October 1951, initially carrying programmes on Tuesdays, Wednesdays, Saturdays and Sundays from 8 to 9 pm every evening - the rest of the week was "TV-free". Only 200 television receivers existed in Copenhagen. On 30 August 1952, atop the Sygekasse building in Odense, television signals from Copenhagen were received precariously, as the signal travelled 140km in a straight line, while recorded film of the Queen's coronation in June gave television more impulse in Denmark. Consequently, Statsradiofonien started week-long broadcasts on the formerly TV-free days but with repeats of the previous day's schedule. In 1954, television broadcasts expanded to ten hours a week over four days. The first outside broadcast was held in the spring of 1953. The Gladsaxe transmitter was inaugurated on 15 April 1955, extending Statsradiofonien's television coverage.

At the time of the 1960 Summer Olympics, there were 388,000 television sets. Antenna systems were being set up in large cities, considering that Copenhagen had spillover access to Swedish television while southern Denmark had access to West German television. A special telephone was installed at the television facilities in November 1962 for viewers to formally address their complaints directly to DR regarding the quality of the programmes that were broadcast. For the Eurovision network, it produced the 1964 Eurovision Song Contest on 21 March that year from the Tivoli Hall in Copenhagen. During the move to the new TV-Byen facilities, the first edition of TV Avisen was broadcast on 15 October 1965. The Disney Christmas Show was first broadcast in 1967 but did not receive a Danish translation until 1979.

DR TV used an aquarium as an interlude between 1981 and 1985, between programmes with a long pause period, with a camera recording the TV-Byen aquarium. The interlude was known as Pause-fisk. NICAM stereo broadcasts started in 1991. On 6 January 1994, three days after TV 2, DR started calling itself 1'eren (with the logo reading out DR TV 1), although this didn't directly affect the channel's name, which only changed to DR1 after the start of DR2 in 1996. Broadcasts started at 9 am beginning in 2000. On 12 May 2001, it produced the 2001 Eurovision Song Contest, which in Denmark alone attracted an audience of 2,667,000 viewers. Rhymes from the presenters were criticised by viewers after the contest.

In 2006, along with other DR properties, DR1 received a new on-air presentation design from Front Nordic.

In autumn 2012, DR1 was revitalized as a channel for viewers aged 15 to 40.

On 1 December 2013, it lost the right to air the lottery draws.

== Broadcasting hours ==
- 1951–1965: 10 hours a week (5 programmes)
- 1965–1983: 14 hours a day (35 programmes a week)
- 1983–1994: 18 hours a day (50 programmes a week)
- 1994–2002: 21 hours a day (60 programmes a week)
- 2002-today: 24 hours a day

== Technological advances ==
=== Colour television ===
Colour television test broadcasts started in March 1967, with the first large-scale colour broadcasting occurring for the 1968 Winter Olympics in Grenoble, France. DR officially ended "test" transmissions of colour television on 1 April 1970. However, it wasn't until 1978 that their last black-and-white television program (TV Avisen) switched to colour.

=== Teletext ===
On 16 May 1983 at 14:00 CEST, DR launched its first teletext information service, which is still available on all DR channels.

=== Widescreen television ===
In 2004, DR announced plans for a complete switch from a 4:3 screen ratio to 16:9 widescreen broadcasts. The switch occurred in 2006 when DR moved its production facilities from TV-Byen to DR Byen in Copenhagen. The last of DR1's productions to switch to widescreen was the daily news programme (TV Avisen) in November 2006.

=== Digital television ===
At midnight on 1 November 2009, analogue broadcasts shut down nationwide, and DR switched to digital broadcasting.

=== High-definition ===
In January 2012, DR1 switched from 576i SD to 720p HD broadcasting.

=== HbbTV ===
In April 2014, DR launched its HbbTV service on DR1, enabling on-demand streaming of DR content directly on an internet-connected television.

== Logos and identities ==
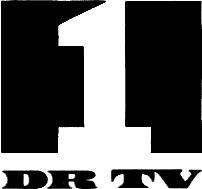
DR1's fourth logo, as DR TV 1, used from 1994 to August 1996

DR1's fifth logo used from 30 August 1996 to 2002

DR1's sixth logo used from 2002 to 31 July 2005

DR1's seventh logo used from 1 June 2005 to 31 August 2009

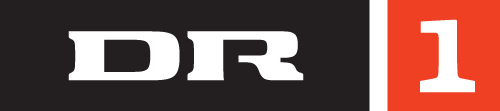
DR1's eighth and previous logo used from 1 September 2009 to 31 January 2013

DR1's ninth from 1 February 2013 to 2020

Stacked version of DR1's ninth and current logo used until 8 October 2017

== Original programming ==
=== Drama ===
- Better Times
- Borgen
- Follow the Money
- Huset på Christianshavn
- Matador
- Sommer
- Taxa
- The Bridge
- The Eagle
- The Kingdom
- The Killing
- The Legacy
- The Protectors
- Nikolaj og Julie
- Rejseholdet

=== News and society ===
- TV Avisen
- Magasinet Penge
- Horisont
- Bag om Borgen
- Aftenshowet
- Kontant
- Rabatten

=== Entertainment ===
- 6200 Aabenraa
- Bonderøven — moved from DR2 following the success of the show
- By på Skrump
- Dansk Melodi Grand Prix — the Danish national selection for the Eurovision Song Contest
- Det Nye Talkshow
- Eurovision Song Contest 1964, Eurovision Song Contest 2001 and Eurovision Song Contest 2014
- Gift ved første blik — moved from DR3 following the success of the show, remade in other countries as Married at First Sight
- Gør det selv
- Ha' det godt
- Hammerslag
- Hvad er det værd?
- Klimaduks og Blærerøv
- Søren Ryge

=== DR productions based on other formats ===
- X Factor (Denmark)

=== Children's entertainment ===
- Disney Sjov (Disney Cartoons)
- Barda
- Morgenhår
- Isas Stepz
- Min Funky Familie
- MGP
- MGP Nordic (together with SVT, NRK and YLE)

=== Other DR productions ===
- DR Kirken
- Før Søndagen
- Sporløs

== Imported programming ==
As with most channels in Denmark, foreign television programmes are shown in their original language but with Danish subtitles.

- bro'Town
- BlackJack
- Columbo
- Conviction
- Dawson's Creek
- Doctor Who
- Downton Abbey
- Endeavour
- Family Guy
- Foyle's War
- From All of Us to All of You
- Homeland
- Lewis
- Little House on the Prairie
- Merlin
- Midsomer Murders
- Planet Earth
- Seinfeld
- Small Claims
- Sugar Rush
- Taggart
- The Last Enemy
