= DR2 =

Danish national television channel

- Country: Denmark
- Broadcast area: Danish Realm
- Headquarters: DR Byen; Copenhagen, Denmark

Programming
- Language: Danish
- Picture format: 16:9 720p (HDTV)

Ownership
- Owner: DR
- Sister channels: DR1; DR Ramasjang

History
- Launched: 30 August 1996; 29 years ago

Availability

Streaming media
- DR TV: www.dr.dk/drtv/kanal/20876 (only in EU and EEA)

DR2 (DR To) is the second television channel of the Danish Broadcasting Corporation (DR). It covers a wide range of subject matter but tends towards more "highbrow" programmes than the more mainstream and popular DR1. Like DR's other TV and radio channels, it is funded by a media licence and is therefore commercial-free.

== History ==
DR2 was launched in 1996 as a satellite- and cable-only channel. This was highly controversial at the time, as it was considered close to a breach of public service principles that the new station did not reach all viewers. Adding to the critics' cause was that DR did have broadband spectrum available for terrestrial broadcasts. However, this was reserved for digital broadcasting tests. The less-than-100%-coverage coupled with a "highbrow" reputation resulted in low ratings, which in turn earned it the nickname "the secret channel" to the regret of the director general who had been pushing the line "my channel" (in the sense of programmes appealing to individuals, not the whole family as DR1 supposedly). This was finally remedied on 31 March 2006, when terrestrial digital broadcasts started.

In 2006, along with other DR properties, DR2 and its news service Deadline received a new on-air presentation design from Front Nordic.

Following the introduction of digital television (and the closing down of all analogue channels except for cable) in Denmark on 1 November 2009, the channel is broadcast free-to-air via a public DVB-T and MPEG-4 system. It now reaches the whole country and the nearby east side of the Øresund to the southernmost areas of Sweden.

In 2013, the channel was rebranded and converted to a 24-hour channel with the inclusion of hourly news and current affairs programming. DR Update previously aired some programming before the channel was closed to make room for DR Ultra. DR2, unlike DR Update, will not interrupt any programmes for breaking news.

The channel switched from SD to 720p HD broadcasting on 28 February 2017.

== Logos and identities ==
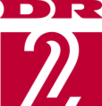
DR2's first and former logo used from its launch in 1996 to November 2002

DR2's second and former logo used from November 2002 to June 2005

DR2's third and former logo used from 1 June 2005 to 31 August 2009

DR2's fourth and previous logo used from 1 September 2009 to 31 January 2013

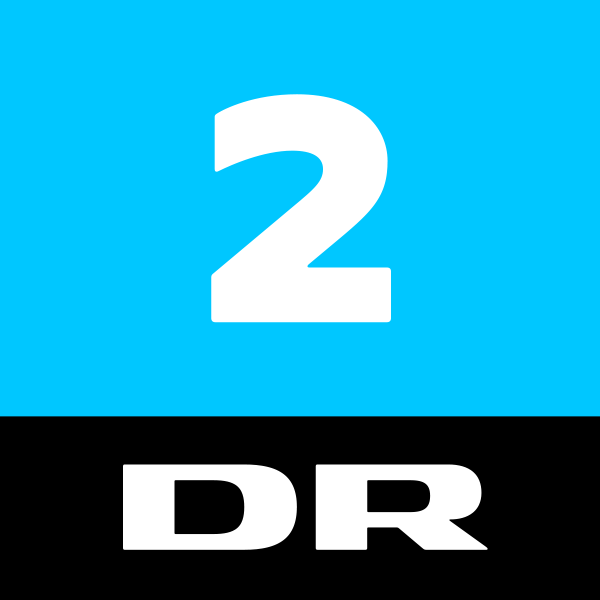
DR2's fifth and current logo since 1 February 2013

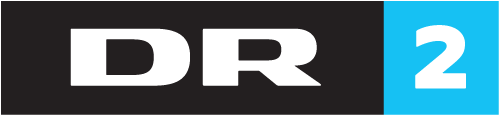
DR2's vertical version of the fifth and current logo used until 17 January 2018

== Programming ==
DR2 has become famous for its daily satirical TV shows, which were established due to the success of such programmes on Danish television. It resembles the British BBC Four because its main output is experimental comedy, documentaries and in-depth news programmes. It has earned much praise for high-quality shows, especially in the first category, with series like Casper & Mandrilaftalen and Drengene fra Angora. Den 11. time was a talk show on the channel. It also broadcasts many British productions, e.g. crime dramas such as Prime Suspect.

On Saturdays, DR2 broadcasts the Greenlandic-language news bulletin Nyheder fra Grønland, produced by KNR.

Between 8 and 10:30 pm on Wednesdays, various European thriller series are aired. Every Friday at 8 pm, a rather recently produced film is aired. A classic film is broadcast on late Sunday afternoons (ending at 8 pm), typically from the late 1960s until the mid-1990s.

The news programme, called Deadline, airs at 10:30 pm and differs from DR 1's TV Avisen in just giving a brief overview of today's events, usually followed by two news that are treated more deeply. DR2 is sometimes used as "Breaking News", but only when called for. The channel also covers societal issues and various types of society-related debates.

=== Original programming ===
- Vesterbro — comedy
- Deadline — news
- So ein Ding — about new technical products
- Filmperler — quality films from all countries
- TV TV TV — television about television
- Rytteriet — Danish comedy
- Bonderøven — later moved to DR1 following the show's success
- Jul på Vesterbro — Danish Christmas comedy (broadcast between 1 and 24 December)

=== Imported programming ===
As is the practice with most other television channels in Denmark, foreign programmes are shown in their original language but with Danish subtitles.

- Columbo
- Waking the Dead
- Above Suspicion
- Hamish Macbeth
- Wycliffe
- Spooks
- The Body Farm
- Cato Isaksen
- Génesis, en la mente del asesino
- Engrenaves
- Flying Doctors
- The Daily Show
- Pilot Guides
