= DR Byen =

Headquarters of DR in Copenhagen, Denmark

Coordinates: 55°39′29″N 12°35′26″E

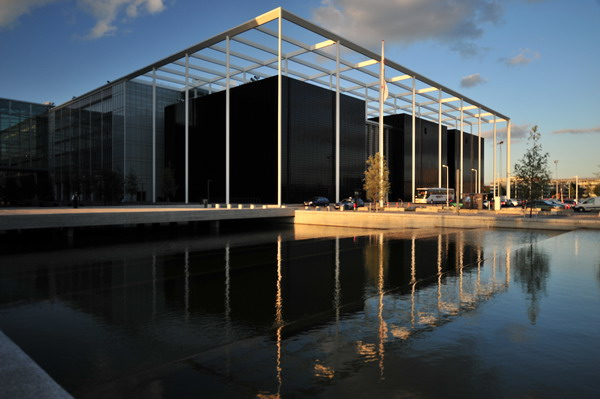
- DR Byen, Segment 1
- Interactive map of DR Byen

General information
- Location: Copenhagen, Emil Holms Kanal 20; 0999 Copenhagen C, Denmark
- Owner: DR

Design and construction
- Architect: Vilhelm Lauritzen Architects
- Civil engineer: COWI, Carl Bro

DR Byen (Danish pronunciation: [ˈte̝ˀˌɛɐ̯ ˈpyˀən]; lit. 'the DR city') is the headquarters of the Danish Broadcasting Corporation, DR, located in Copenhagen, Denmark, in the northwestern part of Amager. The first employees moved into DR Byen in 2006 and 2007, but the entire building, including the Koncerthuset Concert Hall, was not completed until 2010.

The construction industry's enormous budget overruns have been widely discussed, and were also one of the main reasons of former CEO Kenneth Plummer's announcement on March 13, 2007, that 521 positions would be cut, and that 300 employees would be dismissed. DR Byen replaced Radiohuset in Frederiksberg and TV-Byen in Søborg.

== Facilities ==
The complex is approximately 131,000 m^{2} in size, including a basement divided into four segments, each housing their own departments. All the segments are connected by an "Indre Gade" of approximately 5,000 m^{2} including the basement, which cuts through DR Byen at the height of the 2nd floor, and is about 180 meters long.

DR Byen consists of four segments:

- Segment 1: Houses all facilities related to DR's TV productions. This is DR Byen's largest segment, and houses DR's own television productions. The segment is characterized by the black tiles that characterize the facade.
- Segment 2: Houses DR's news, sport and weather departments. Segment 2 forms the framework for news dissemination. The building is characterized indoors by its large central room (also called the "newsroom"), which with its soft and open glass facades lets light flow into the workplaces in the building. The daily sports and news broadcasts, including TV Avisen and DR Nyheder, are recorded here from the circular studio in the middle of the large room. In addition, several of the radio channel DR P3's broadcasts are broadcast from this building.
- Segment 3: Houses P4 Copenhagen and administration. Segment 3 is DR Byen's middle segment, which consists of the large atrium that connects the buildings. The atrium is designed so that the temperatures follow the seasons. The building houses DR's entire administrative organization, DR Copenhagen and most of DR's internal service facilities, including the canteen. The segment is approx. 17,000 m^{2} incl. basement and was designed by Gottlieb Paludan Architects.
- Segment 4: Houses DR Koncerthuset and consists of four halls. It was designed by the famous architect Jean Nouvel.

The signages at DR Byen were designed by Front Nordic.

The DR Byen Station on the M1 line of Copenhagen Metro is located nearby.

== Budget overruns ==
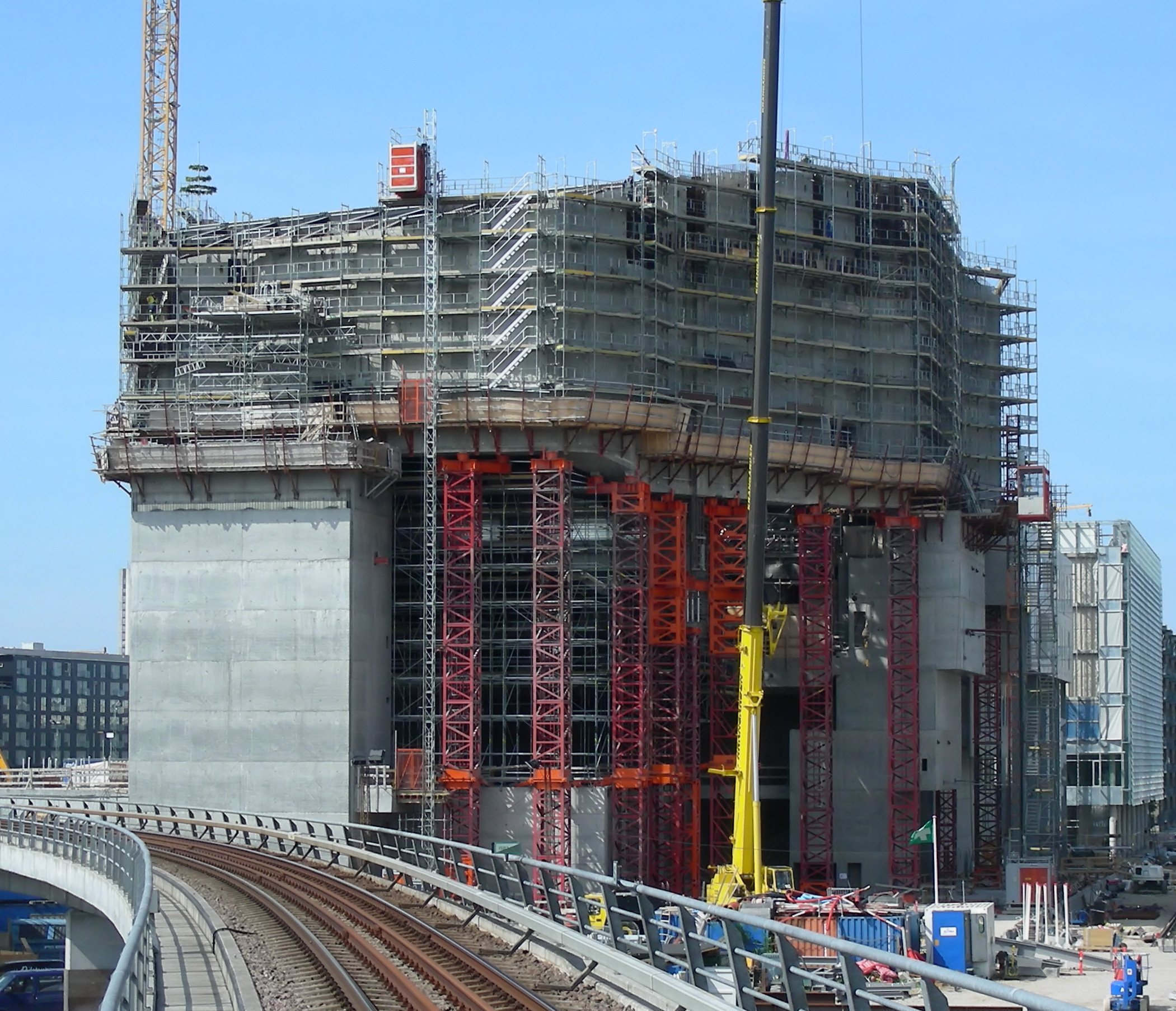
Segment 4. June 2006. Concert hall. Seen from the Metro station.

Originally, the budget for the construction of DR's new headquarters was DKK 3 billion in 1999 prices (almost DKK 3.5 billion in 2006 prices). When construction began in 1999, the then culture minister, Elsebeth Gerner Nielsen (R) made a margin of uncertainty so that the final price of the construction could be 15 percent higher or 10 percent lower – that means between DKK 2.7 billion or 3.5 billion.

The first budget overrun came to light in 2004, when it was announced that the construction cost would be DKK 300 million more expensive. This was due, among other things, to the fact that the construction of DR Byen's concert hall was far more complicated than first assumed. The then-chairman of DR's board, Jørgen Kleener, did not believe that he had been adequately briefed on the construction's development. Christian S. Nissen was dismissed as general manager, and later Jørgen Kleener also chose to resign from his post.

In August 2005, the now former general manager, Kenneth Plummer, takes over. He announces a tighter management of the economy in DR, and shaves off DKK 90 million in a round of savings.

The second budget overrun is published in September 2006. The construction will cost an additional DKK 600 million. DR's finance director Bent Fjord resigns as a result of the overrun.

TV Avisen tells on October 10, 2006, that the construction management has been aware at least since September 2005 that there could be budget overruns of over DKK 250 million. Two days later DR's board asks the National Audit Office to investigate the case. Prior to the board meeting, the person responsible for DR construction, Kjeld Boye Møller, is dismissed.

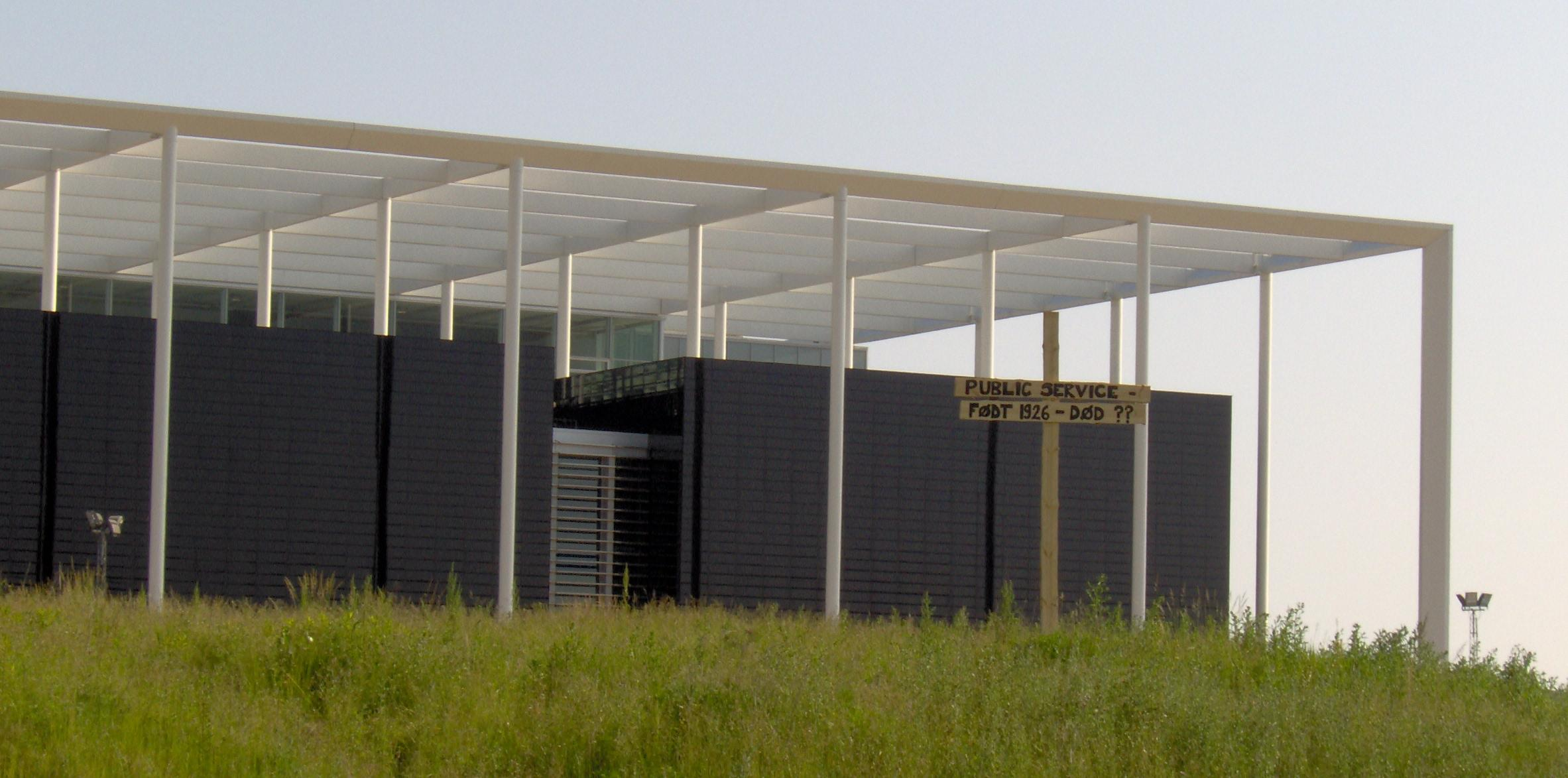
DR employees raised this cross over public service in protest over savings due to budget slippage on the construction of DR Byen.

On February 5, 2007, it was announced that construction is progressing with another DKK 700 million, so that the total bill in 1999 prices will be DKK 4.7 billion, corresponding to DKK 5.5 billion in 2007 prices. In other words, construction has become 34 percent more expensive in 1999 prices than the maximum margin of uncertainty allowed.

On March 13, 2007, CEO Kenneth Plummer announces a comprehensive savings plan, which entails the dismissal of 300 employees and savings of DKK 300 million per year from 2008. A total of 521 positions were cut.

An emergency power system was not included in the original budget. If the emergency power system is included, the excess will be DKK 0.3 billion greater, cf. the audit study, point 2.2.

The building complex's name is an example of særskrivning (cf. TV-Byen and Radiohuset).

== Gallery ==
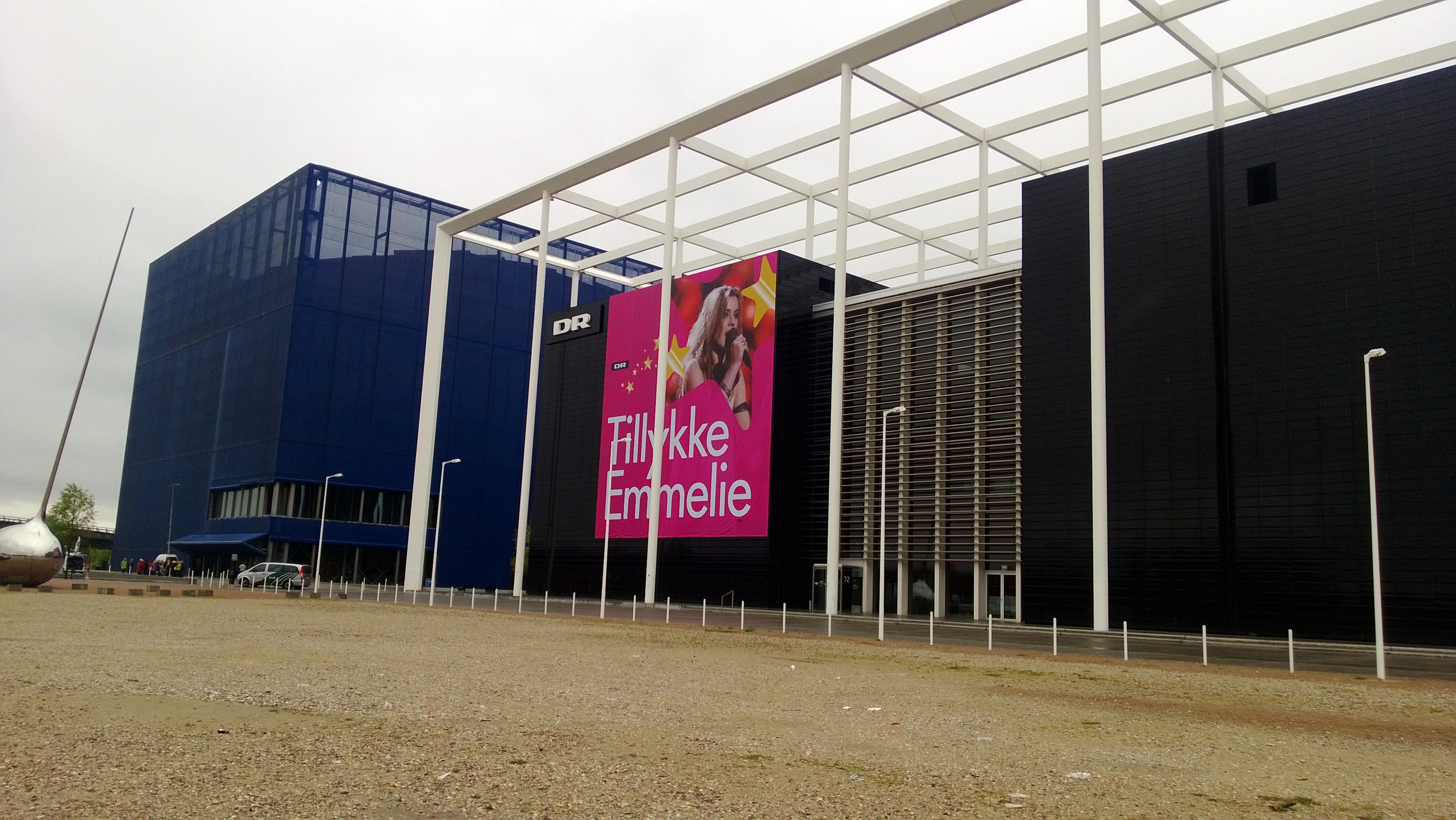
A banner on DR Byen congratulating Emmelie de Forest on her Eurovision Song Contest 2013 win

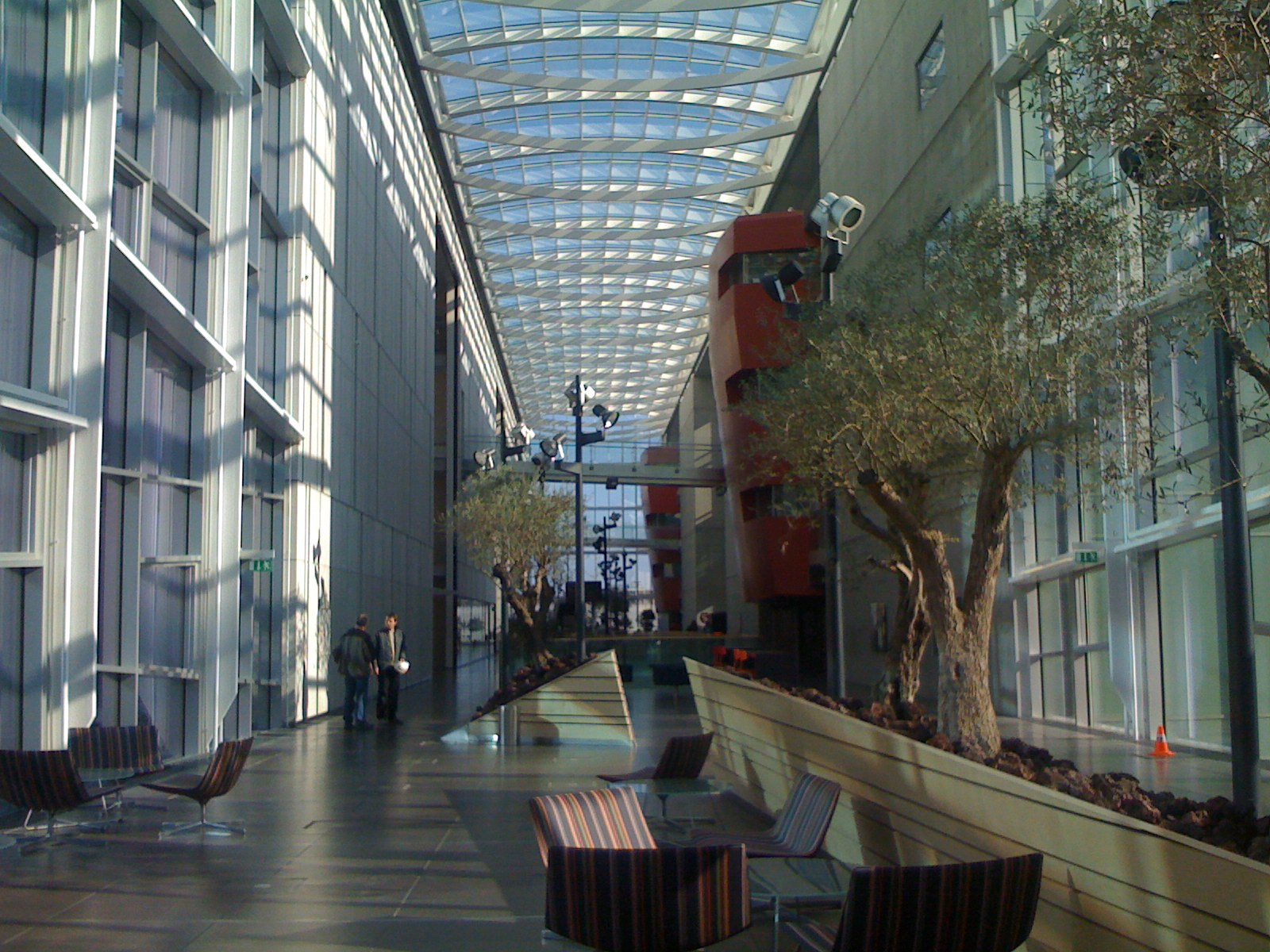
Covered "street" in DR Byen

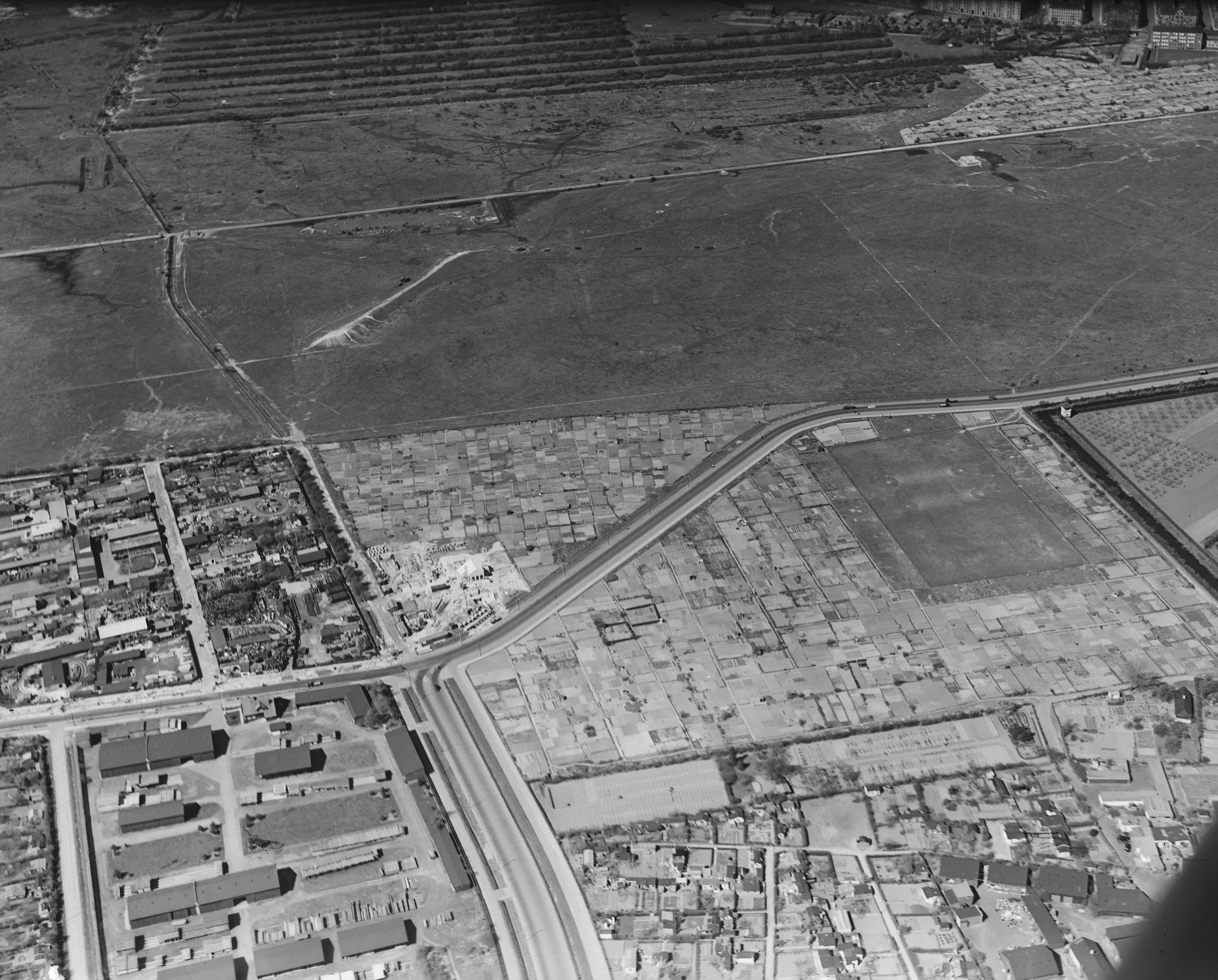
Aerial photo from 1953. DR Byen would be built where Røde Mellemvej (left) which continues into Amager Fælledvej (right) bends

== See also ==
- DR Byen station
