= DR TV =

Danish television streaming service

DRTV
- Original author: DR
- Developer: DR
- Operating system: Windows OS X Linux; Windows Phone 8.0, 8.1; Windows 10 Mobile iOS (iPad, iPhone); Android; Apple TV; Chromecast; PlayStation 3 PlayStation 4
- Type: Television catch-up
- Website: www.dr.dk/drtv

DR TV is an internet streaming catch-up television service for people in Denmark, made by Danish Broadcasting Corporation (DR). The service is available on a wide range of devices, including mobile phones and tablets, personal computers, and smart televisions.

The service was formerly called DR Nu, but was relaunched on 2 June 2014 as DR TV.

== Television platforms ==
=== HbbTV ===
DR TV is available as a HbbTV service on all DR digital TV channels.

=== Apple TV ===
On 30 October 2015 DR TV became available on the 4th generation of Apple TV.

=== Panasonic Smart TV ===
Panasonic added DR TV on 17 March 2017 as an app on their Smart TV sets from 2014 to 2017.

== Consoles ==
=== PlayStation 3, 4 ===
On 30 November 2015 DR TV was released as an app on PlayStation 3 and 4.
