= DR (broadcaster) =

Danish public service broadcaster

Danish Broadcasting Corporation (DR)
- Logo used since 2013

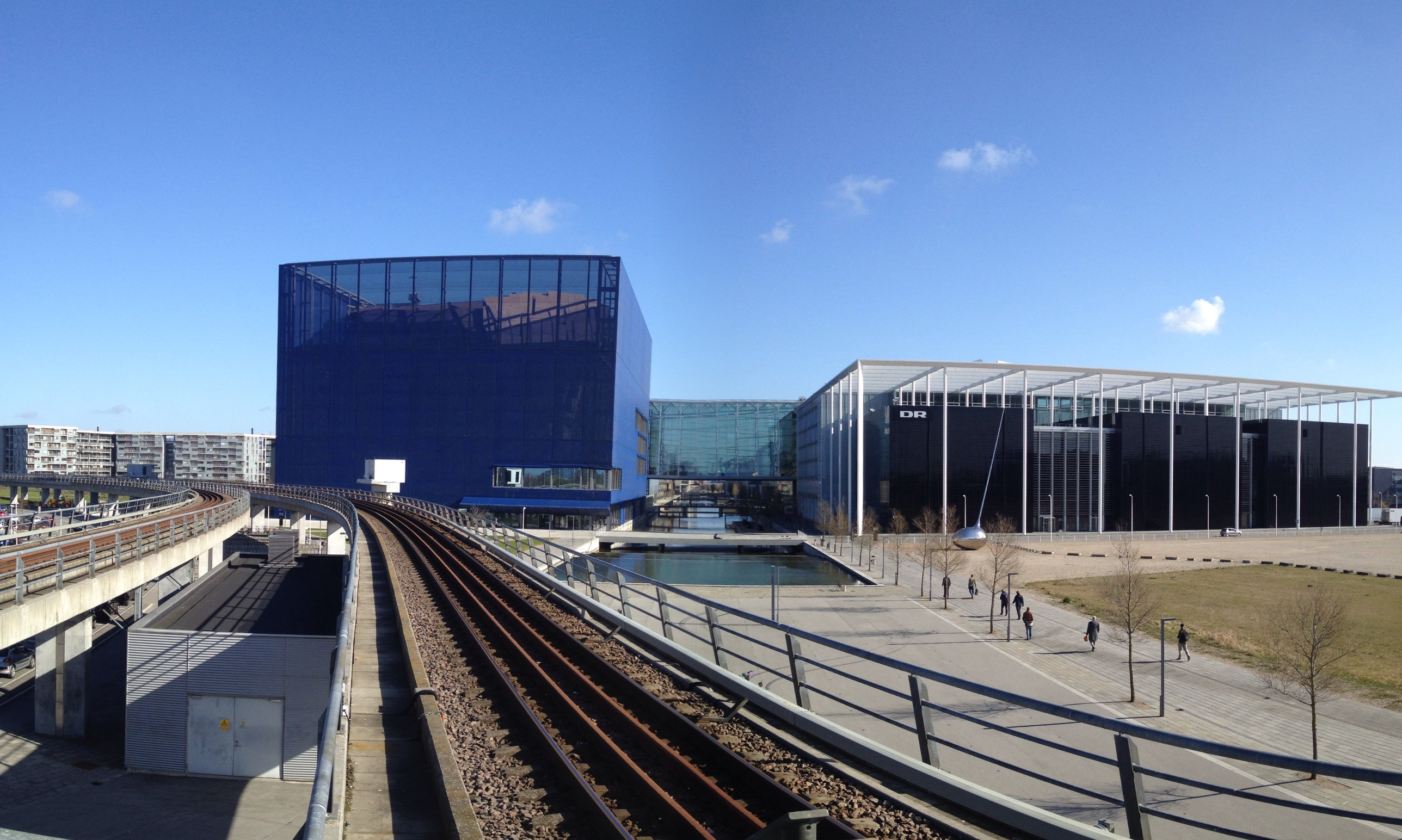
- Formerly: Radioordningen (1925–1926); Statsradiofonien (1926–1959); Danmarks Radio (1959–1996)
- Type: Publicly funded public-service broadcaster and online
- Industry: Mass media
- Founded: 1 April 1925; 101 years ago
- Headquarters: DR Byen, Copenhagen, Denmark
- Area served: Kingdom of Denmark
- Key people: Bjarne Corydon (Director-General); Marianne Bedsted (Chairman)
- Revenue: 3,789,800,000 Danish krone (2021)
- Net income: −95,400,000 Danish krone (2021)
- Total assets: 5,773,300,000 Danish krone (2021)
- Number of employees: 2,439 (2021)
- Website: Official website

DR (pronounced [ˈte̝ˀˌɛɐ̯]), officially the Danish Broadcasting Corporation in English, is a Danish public-service radio and television broadcasting company. Founded in 1925 as a public-service organization, it is Denmark's oldest and largest electronic media enterprise. DR shares many of its organisational characteristics with its British counterpart, the BBC, on which it was largely modelled. DR is a founding member of the European Broadcasting Union.

DR was originally funded by a media licence, however since 2022, the media license has been replaced by an addition to the Danish income tax.

Today, DR operates three television channels, all of which are distributed free-to-air via a nationwide DVB-T2 network. DR also operates seven radio channels. All are available nationally on DAB+ radio and online, with the four original stations also available on FM radio. Bjarne Corydon serves as the current Director-General of DR since August 2025.

== History ==
DR was founded on 1 April 1925 under the name of Radioordningen, which was changed to Statsradiofonien in 1926, then to Danmarks Radio in 1959, and to DR in 1996.

During the German occupation of Denmark in World War II, radio broadcasts were censored – under particularly harsh conditions from August 1943 – leading many Danes to turn to Danish-language broadcasts from the BBC or the illegal press, as well as Swedish radio in 1944–1945.

Statsradiofonien's second FM radio station, Program 2 (P2), was added in 1951, followed by P3 in 1963.

Experimental television broadcasts started in 1949, with regular programming beginning on 2 October 1951 with the launch of Denmark's first television channel. Daily programming began in 1954. Colour television test broadcasts were started in March 1967, with the first large-scale colour broadcasting occurring for the 1968 Winter Olympics in Grenoble, France. Danmarks Radio officially ended its "test" transmissions of colour television on 1 April 1970, although it wasn't until 1978 that the organisation's last black-and-white television programme (TV Avisen—The News) went over to colour.

In 1968, Danish television introduced television satire as a new entertainment genre. The production of satirical series by the entertainment department at DR occurred during a time when DR held a monopoly on radio and television broadcasting from 1925 to 1988, and from 1951 onwards, respectively.

At 14.00 local time on 16 May 1983 DR launched its first teletext information service, which is still available on all DR channels.

Danmarks Radio's monopoly on national television lasted until 1988, when TV2 started broadcasting. 8 years later DR launched their second television channel, DR2, on 30 August 1996. It was sometimes called den hemmelige kanal (lit. 'the secret channel') in its early years because it could not be seen nationwide at its launch.

The first trials of DAB were carried out in 1995, with eight channels officially launching in October 2002.

In 2006, as part of its relocation to DR Byen, DR was rebranded with a new logo designed by Front Nordic.

On 7 June 2007, DR launched an online-only news channel DR Update. It was later added as a traditional channel. With the switch to over-the-air digital signals on 1 November 2009, DR added three new channels to its lineup

- DR K - an intercultural, documentary and "odd-film" channel.
- DR HD – Denmark's first free-to-air high-definition channel intended to air successful shows from the other DR channels in true HD only, with no upscaling.
- DR Ramasjang, a children's channel.

In 2013, a new logo in which the letters "DR" featured in a white sans-serif font on a black background was introduced, and the line-up of television channels was changed once again. A new channel targeting young people, DR3 replaced DR HD. Another channel for children, DR Ultra replaced DR Update. The closure of DR Update was the start of a revamping of DR 2 as a channel for news and society.

A nationwide switch from DAB to the newer DAB+ format took place on 1 October 2017. All of DR's stations plus the privately owned, public service channel - Radio24Syv, moved to the second national DAB+ multiplex (DAB-blok 2).

=== Relocation of DR and funding crisis ===
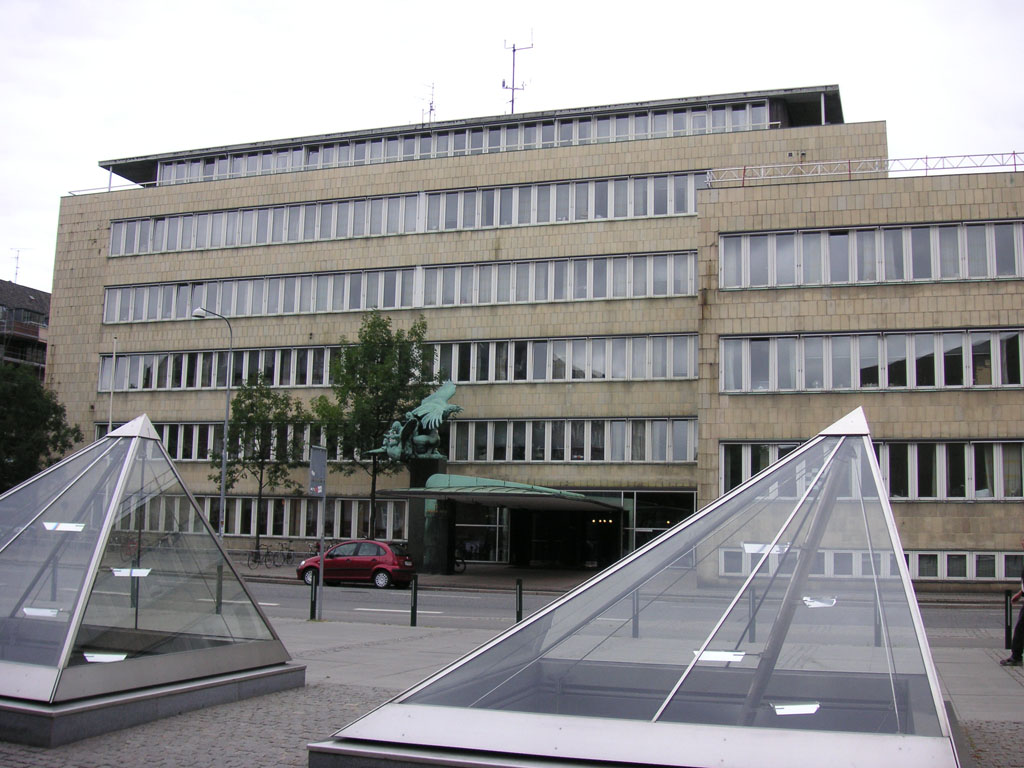
The former headquarters of DR, Radiohuset on Rosenørns Allé

During 2006–07, DR moved all of its activities from Radiohuset in Frederiksberg and TV-Byen in Søborg to a new complex in the Ørestad area of Copenhagen. The new building, called DR Byen (lit. 'the DR city'), covers an area of approximately 133,000 m^{2} (1,431,600 sq ft).

The project became more expensive than planned, forcing DR to make drastic budget cuts. In April 2007, it was announced that 300 employees would be laid off, meaning that most of the sports department would be closed down as well as most of the educational department, several programmes and the radio channel DR X. DR would also give up its rights to the Olympic Games and attempt to sell the rights to a number of other sports events including football.

As the major recipient of license funds, DR operates under a public service contract with the government which it was unable to fulfil in the wake of the budget crisis related to the move. The budget overspends caused a major scandal which saw senior management of DR replaced, and was followed by a heated political debate over whether the service should receive additional emergency funding. Various measures to mitigate the impact on the public service obligations of the institution were contemplated by the Danish Parliament, and a compromise was agreed to limit the impact of the deficit.

== Logo history ==
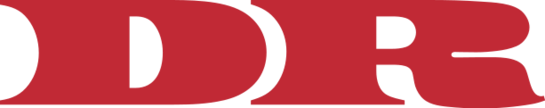
DR's first logo used from 1964 to 29 August 1996.

DR's second logo used from 30 August 1996 to 31 May 2005.

DR's third logo used from 1 June 2005 to 31 August 2009.

DR's fourth logo used from 1 September 2009 to 31 January 2013.

DR's fifth and current logo used since 1 February 2013.

== Financing ==
The principal means of funding DR is through the media licence, costing 2,492 DKK ($356 USD) per year per household since 2017. Traditionally it was the owners of radio and television receiving sets who were obliged to pay the licence fee. The increased availability of online streaming, however, led to the replacement on 1 January 2007 of the television licence by a more widely payable "media licence". This licence is mandatory not just for those with television sets but also for all those who own a computer, smartphone, or any other device enabling access to the internet.

In 2007, approximately 180,000 households did not pay the media licence.

Additional revenue comes from such commercial activities as the mounting of DR-organized concerts and other events in the Koncerthuset, the sale of books, CDs, and DVDs, as well as overseas sales from the catalogue of DR-made programmes.

Over a period of four years, starting in 2019 through 2022, the media licence was replaced by general taxation, as announced on 16 March 2018 by a majority in the Danish Parliament consisting of Venstre, the Conservatives, the Liberal Alliance, and the Danish People's Party.

== Board of directors ==
DR's board of directors comprises 11 members appointed for a four-year period. Three members, including the chair, are appointed by the Minister of Culture, and six by Parliament, while the employees of DR elect two members. The board has overall responsibility for DR programs and for the hiring of DR's chief executive, the director general, and the remaining management positions. Their names are unknown.

== Notable television programmes ==
=== DR productions ===
Some notable DR productions include Better Times, Borgen, Dansk Melodi Grand Prix (the Danish national selection for the Eurovision Song Contest), MGP,(Childrens version of Dansk Melodi Grand Prix and previous national selection for the (Junior Eurovision Song Contest) Follow the Money, Gift ved første blik (remade in other countries as Married at First Sight), Matador, The Bridge, The Legacy and The Killing.

DR has organised three editions of the Eurovision Song Contest, all in Copenhagen: in 1964, 2001 and 2014; Eurovision Young Musicians 1986, and the inaugural edition of the Junior Eurovision Song Contest in 2003. It was also the host broadcaster for Congratulations: 50 Years of the Eurovision Song Contest in 2005.

== Services ==
=== Radio ===
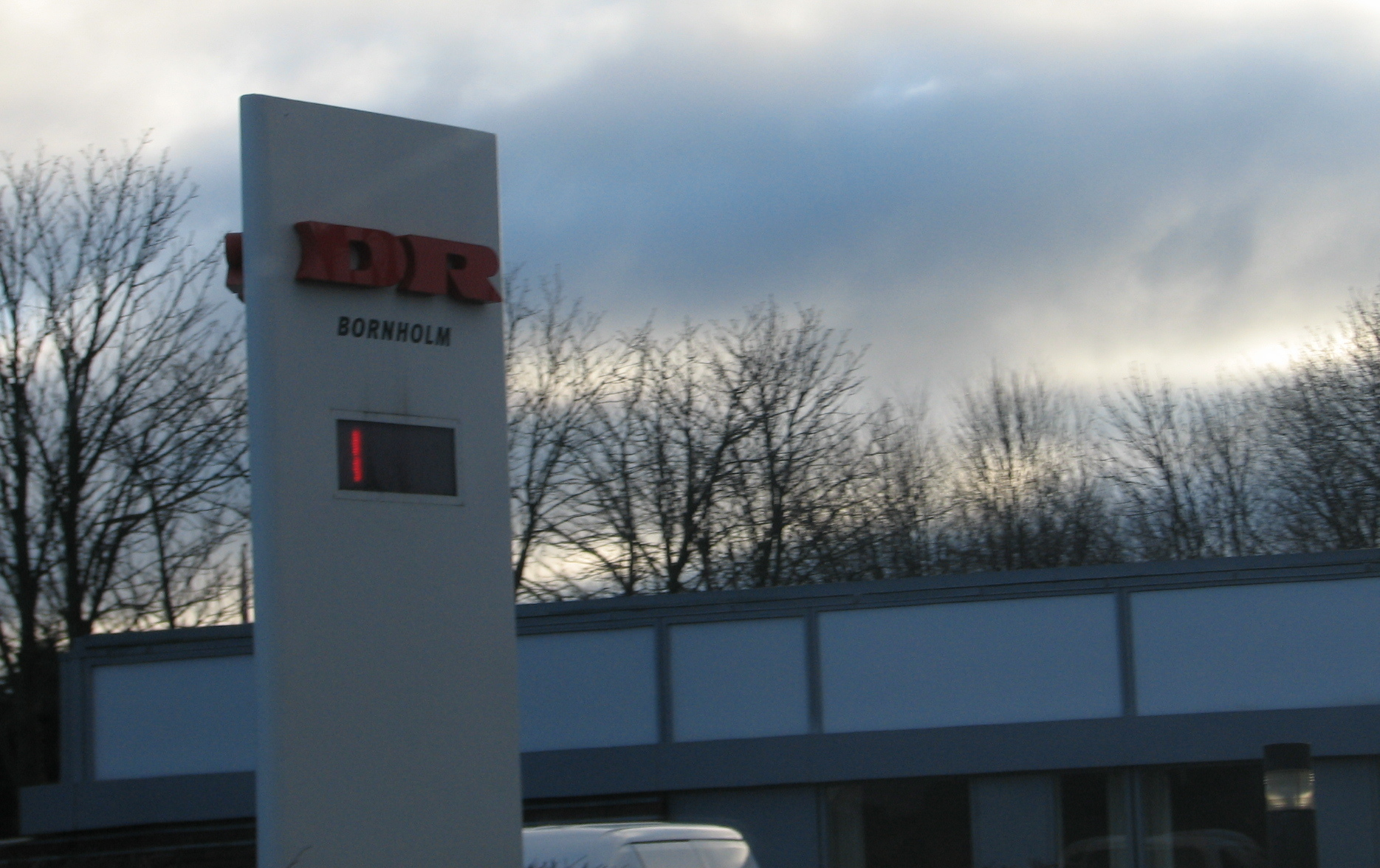
DR regional office in Rønne.

- DR P1 – "Thought-provoking radio": factual programming, reports, discussion and debate on public affairs, society and the community, plus in-depth news.
- DR P2 – "Music and cultural radio": classical music, opera, jazz, radio drama, and coverage of other artistic performances and events.
- DR P3 – Hit radio, with popular entertainment shows and hourly three-minute news bulletins. P3 also covers major sporting events.
- DR P4 – DR's most popular radio channel: a "modern public service station" broadcast in 10 regional versions, mixing popular music with national and local news. P4 also provides a Traffic Message Channel for delivering traffic and travel information.
- DR P5 – Focuses on older music from the 1950s and 1960s mixed in with some newer music.
- DR P6 Beat – In depth focus on underground and popular music scene.
- DR P7 Mix - Was in depth of Pop music it was last broadcast on 2 January 2020
- DR P8 Jazz – Jazz.
- DR Langbølge – The 243 kHz longwave radio, used to cover nearby maritime areas, with news and weather broadcasts. The transmissions are only four times daily at 05:45, 08:45, 11:45 and 17:45 local time. The service ended on 31 December 2023 at circa 1705z.

=== Television ===
- DR1 (24h, HD): the main channel, this is the home of drama series (including DR's own high-profiled productions), entertainment shows, films and documentaries, as well as the flagship evening news, sport, and weather programmes.
- DR2 (24h, HD): breaking news, documentaries, debate, comedy, and films.
- DR Ramasjang (5.00–20.00, HD): TV for children aged 3–13.

=== Online ===
- DR3 – Innovative programming, chiefly aimed at viewers aged between 15 and 39.
- DR Minisjang – For children aged 1–3.
- DR Ultra – For children aged 7–12.
- DR Bonanza – Original programming archive. Replaced by Gensyn on DR TV on 15 March 2024.
- TVA Live – News channel

== Geographical terrestrial coverage ==
Denmark
All of Denmark is covered by digital terrestrial reception through a nationwide DVB-T2 and MPEG-4 network comprising five multiplexes (MUX). DR owns MUX 1, which broadcast all DR channels unencrypted.

Greenland
Every populated place in Greenland can receive DR1, DR2 and DR Ramasjang free-to-air via a public DVB-T network. In the capital Nuuk, the radio station DR P1 is available on FM.

Faroe Islands
Televarpið, a subsidiary of Faroese Telecom, covers the Faroe Islands with a DVB-T network broadcasting DR1, DR2 and DR Ramasjang.

== Orchestras and ensembles ==
- Danish National Symphony Orchestra
- DR Big Band
- Danish National Vocal Ensemble
- Danish National Concert Choir
- Danish National Girls Choir
- Danish National Choir School

Disbanded DR orchestras

- Danish Chamber Orchestra

== Awards and competitions ==
Since 1963, DR has awarded the Rosenkjær Prize to a person who has proven an ability to make a difficult subject accessible to a wider audience in an understandable and vivid form. The prizewinner commits to hold a number of radio lectures. The prize is named after Jens Rosenkjær (1883–1976), Head of State Broadcasting 1937–53. The prize is now DKK 50,000, up from 25,000 in 2008, and 40,000 in 2009.

In collaboration with Bandakademiet, DR holds the annual KarriereKanonen competition for unsigned Danish artists. Artists submit their music to DR, from which 10 acts are selected by a jury to play at the Spot music festival. Following the festival, a cohort of semifinalists are selected to play at Smukfest, where three winners are announced. The winners get airplay on DR P3 and P6 BEAT. KarriereKanonen has helped launch the careers of a number of Danish artists, including: The Minds of 99, Magtens Korridorer, Tue West, and Rasmus Nøhr.

== Accusations of bias ==
For over a decade, the Danish People's Party, a nativist and anti-immigrant political party, has criticised DR for alleged bias in its political news coverage, citing the process for appointment to DR's board of directors. In response, DR set up a "watchdog committee" intended to detect and report upon any bias. Members of the watchdog committee are unknown.

The first large-scale scientific content analysis of political news coverage on DR published by the Centre for Journalism at the University of Southern Denmark, studying election news coverage in the years 1994–2007, documented no persistent political bias towards either the left or the right. News coverage of political actors and parties was found to be largely similar to the news coverage on DR's competitor TV 2. The study concluded that political news coverage on both broadcasters was guided by journalistic professional criteria as to the newsworthiness of political actors and political issues, not by partisan considerations.

In 2008, Mikael Rothstein, Jewish author and professor of religious history at the University of Copenhagen, was highly critical of DR when it issued a Christian values policy, declaring that Muslims would feel excluded.

== See also ==
- List of television stations in Denmark
- Matilde Kimer
