= Hans Wegner =

Danish furniture designer (1914–2007)

Hans Jørgensen Wegner MAA
- Born: 2 April 1914; Tønder, Prussia, German Empire
- Died: 26 January 2007 (aged 92); Copenhagen
- Resting place: Mariebjerg Cemetery
- Education: Teknologisk Institut; Danmarks Designskole
- Occupation: Architect
- Known for: Chair design
- Style: Danish modern
- Movement: Modernism
- Spouse: Inga Helbo (m. 1940)
- Children: Marianne Wegner Sørensen; Eva Wegner
- Awards: Lunning Prize (1951); Grand prix of the Milan Triennial IX (1951); Gold medal of the Milan Triennial (1956); Eckersberg Medal (1956); Citation of Merit from the Pratt institute (1961); Prince Eugen Medal (1961); AID design award (1961); Royal Designers for Industry (1969); Diploma di collaborazione Triennale di Milano (1973); Danish Furniture Prize (1980); C. F. Hansen Medal (1982); Danish Design Council's Annual Prize (1987); 8th International Design Award (1997)

Hans Jørgensen Wegner (2 April 1914 – 26 January 2007) was a Danish furniture designer. His work, along with a concerted effort from several of his manufacturers, contributed to the international popularity of mid-century Danish design. His style is often described as Organic Functionality, a modernist school with emphasis on functionality. This school of thought arose primarily in Scandinavian countries with contributions by Poul Henningsen, Alvar Aalto, and Arne Jacobsen.

Wegner has been referred to as the "King of Chairs" for his prolific work designing seating. In his lifetime he designed over 500 different chairs, over 100 of which were put into mass production and many of which have become recognisable design icons.

"If only you could design just one good chair in your life...but you simply cannot."

— Hans Wegner

Wegner received several major design prizes in his lifetime, from the Lunning Prize in 1951 and the Grand Prix of the Milan Triennale in the same year, to the Prince Eugen Medal in Sweden and the Danish Eckersberg Medal. In 1969, he was made honorary Royal designer for industry by the Royal Society of Arts in London.

== Biography ==
=== Early life and education ===
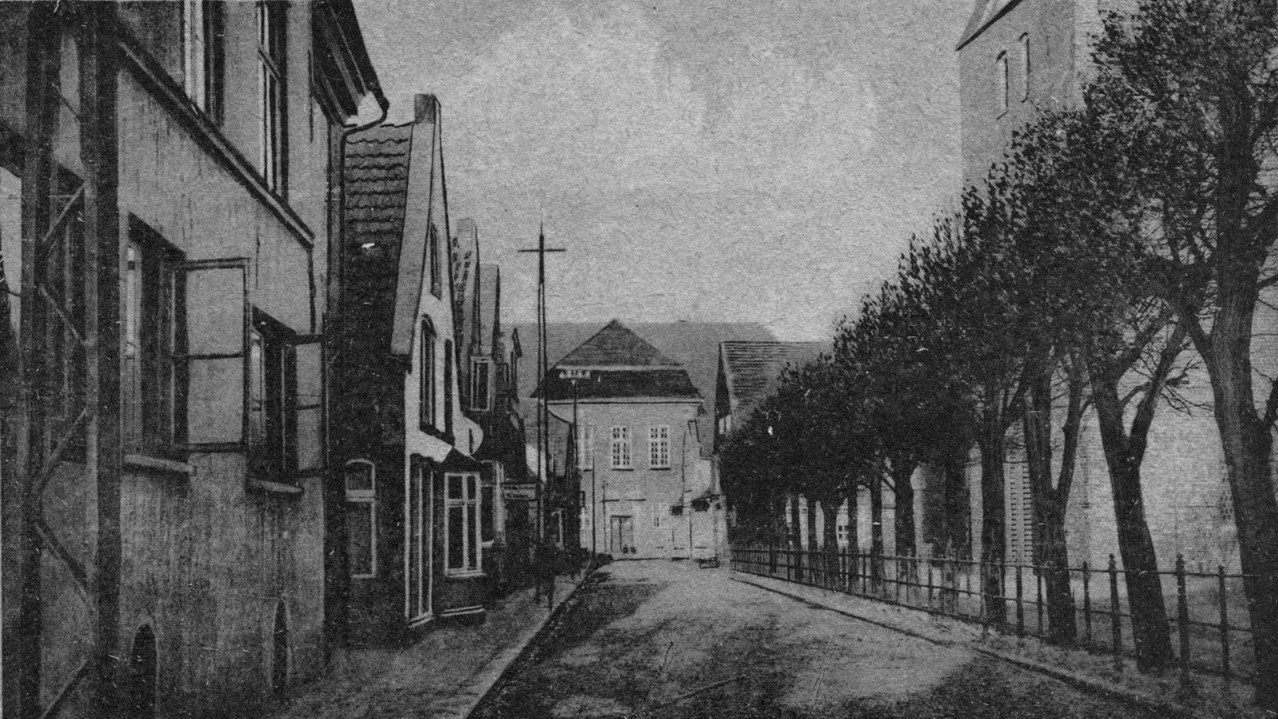
The street of Wegner's childhood home. Circa 1915

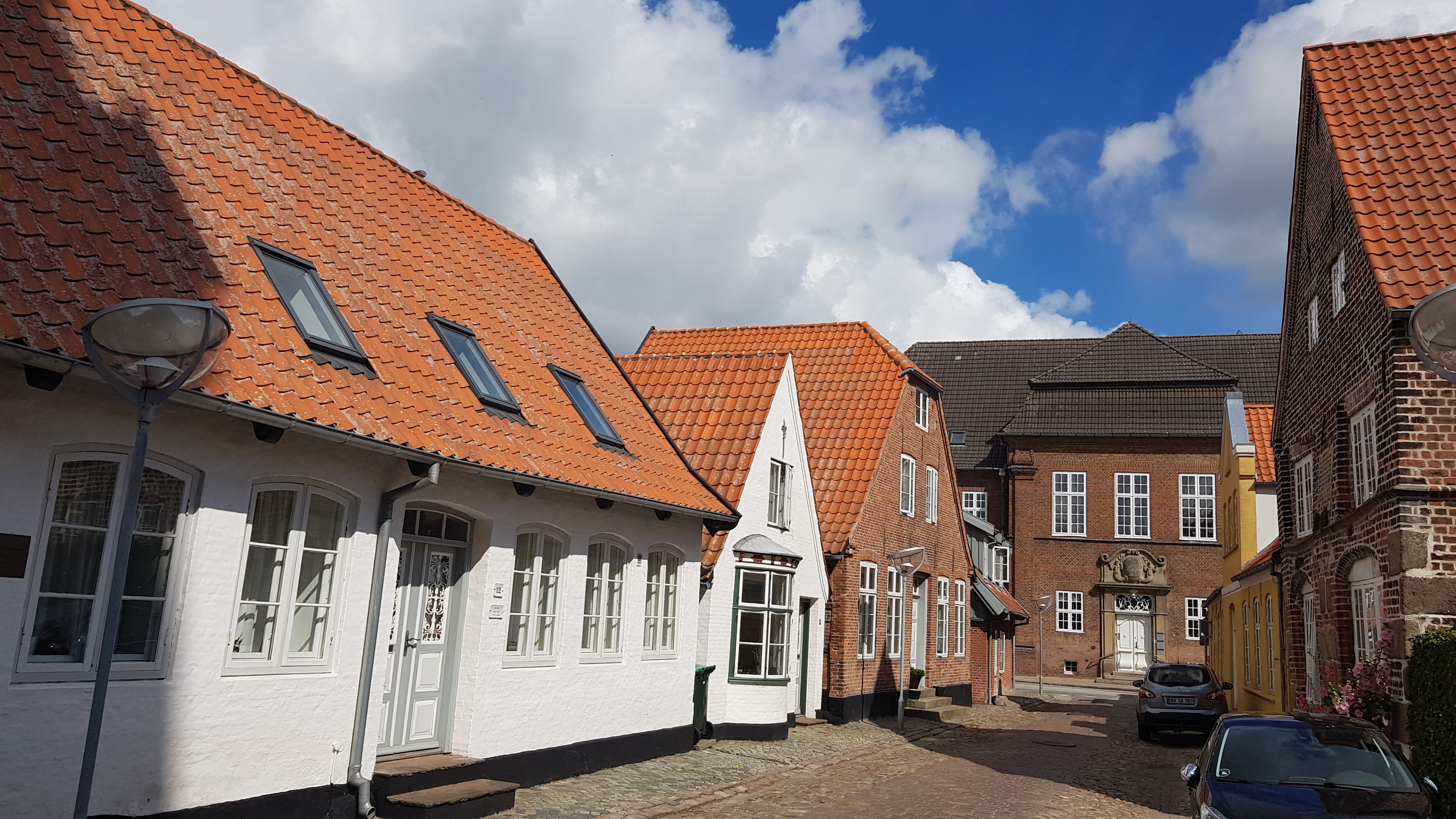
Wegner's childhood home (left) in present day

Wegner was born to cobbler Peter Mathiesen Wegner and Nicoline Lausen on Smedegade 12 in Tønder. At an early age, Wegner showed interest in craft and could draw and create paper cuttings before he learned to walk. At home, Wegner was drawn to woodcarving and created wood sculptures based on Royal Copenhagen figurines he saw at the Tønder Museum.

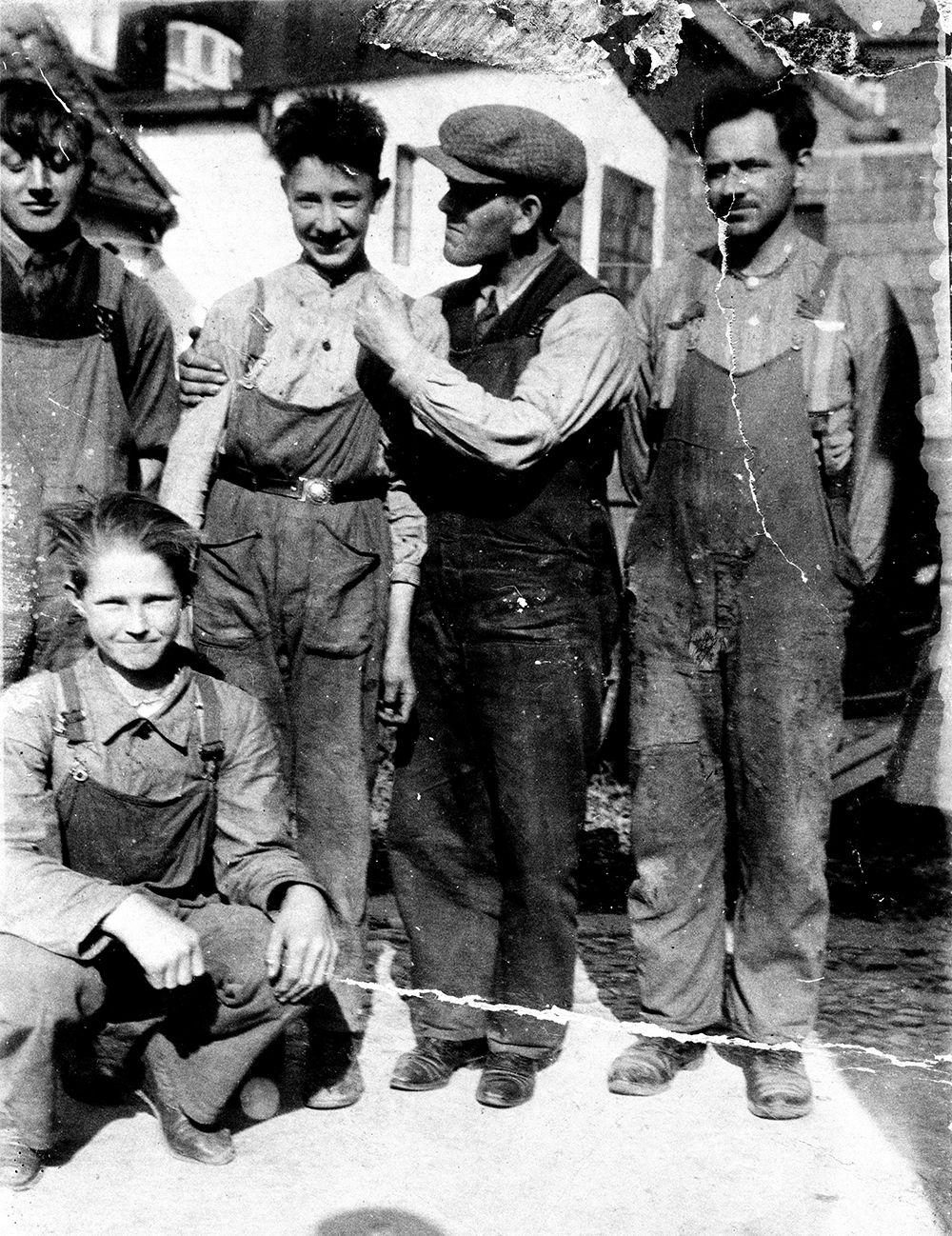
Hans Wegner (third from the left) at the age of 14 during an apprenticeship with H.F. Stahlberg

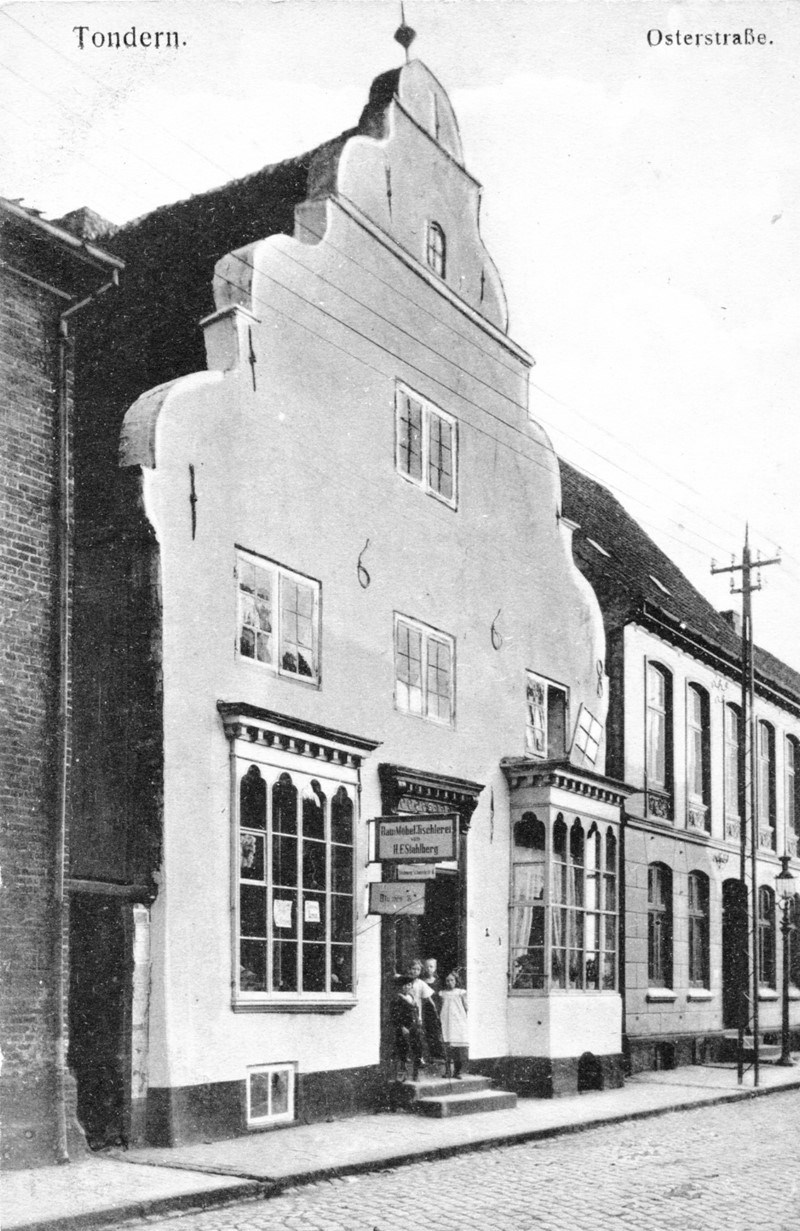
H. F. Stahlberg's workshop where Wegner was employed. Circa 1905

At the age of 14, he worked as a child apprentice to master cabinetmaker H. F. Stahlberg. He soon discovered he had a feeling for wood and developed an affinity towards the material. At the age of 15, he made his first chair. Finishing his apprenticeship at 17, he crafted a lady's desk as part of his journeyman's test and remained employed in the workshop before joining the army.

During the army, he first saw the exhibition of the Copenhagen Cabinetmakers' Guild in 1935. The exhibits were a laboratory for experimentation between Master Cabinetmakers (such as Johannes Hansen, L. Pontoppidan, Niels Vodder, Jacob Kjær, and A. J. Iversen) and the best architects of the time (such as Kaare Klint, Vilhelm Lauritzen, and Ole Wanscher). These exhibits gave Wegner a first-hand experience of what the combination of workmanship and design could produce. Wegner decided to become a designer with the aim of producing and selling his furniture.

Wegner realized his skills needed improvement if he wished to fulfill his dream of opening his own workshop. After the military, Wegner took a 2.5 month cabinetmaking course at the Danish Technological Institute. Subsequently, he attended the School of Arts and Crafts' carpentry program located within the Danish Museum of Art & Design in Copenhagen. Wegner was led by the instruction of Orla Mølgaard-Nielsen, a student from Klint's school, and he was strongly influenced by functionalism. Wegner garnered attention at school from his teachers for his developed drawing skills. His painting teacher tried to convince him to pursue a career as a portrait painter.

He participated at his first Cabinetmakers' Guild exhibition in 1938, where he presented the Stangerup Chair – named after the person who purchased it.

=== Early career in Aarhus ===
In 1938, Wegner took a one-year leave from his studies to work on the Aarhus City Hall project on the recommendation of his teacher. Arne Jacobsen and Erik Møller had won a bid to design the Aarhus City Hall and employed Wegner to create the furniture. However, World War II caused delays in the City Hall project and he was first assigned to work on the Nyborg Public Library under Møller and Flemming Lassen. Today, the library displays early photos of Wegner's contributions to the library as well as a website dedicated to the historic design. While the library was well-received and Møller and Lassen were awarded the Eckersberg Medal, Wegner's contributions weren't as widely publicized at the time. From 1939–1942, Wegner worked on the Aarhus City Hall project and was responsible for all the furnishings. Wegner began working on three lines of modular office furniture for Planmøbler while working on the City Hall. Some of the Planmøbler furniture was used in the office wings of the City Hall.

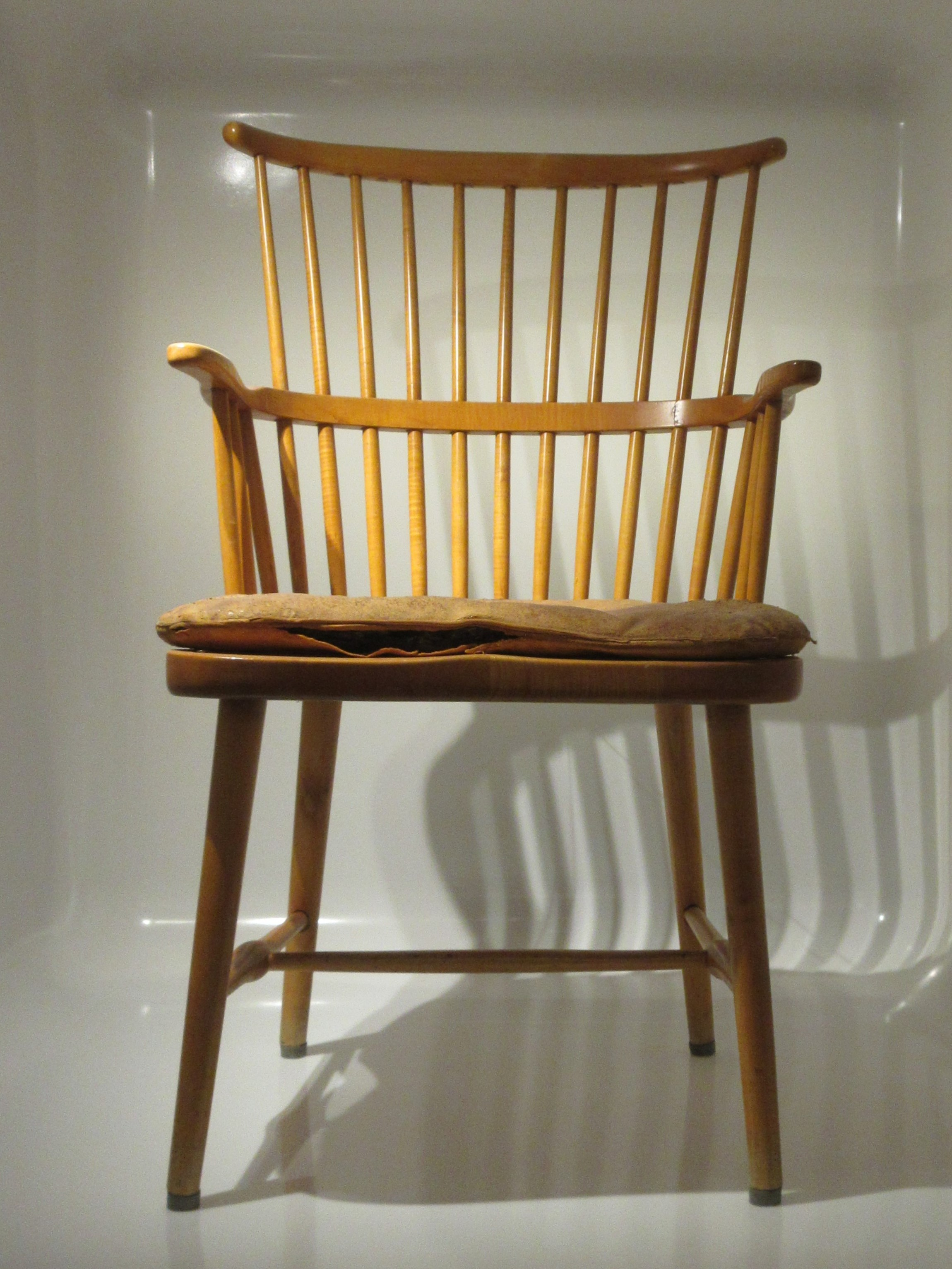
Chair for Nyborg Public Library

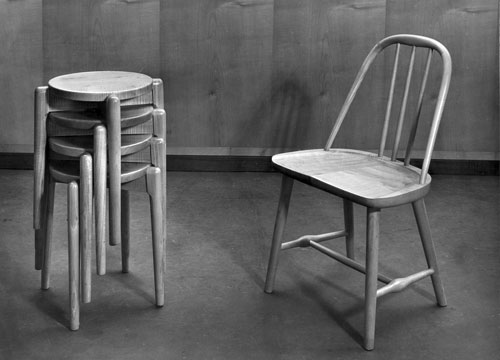
Children's chair and stools for the Nyborg Public Library

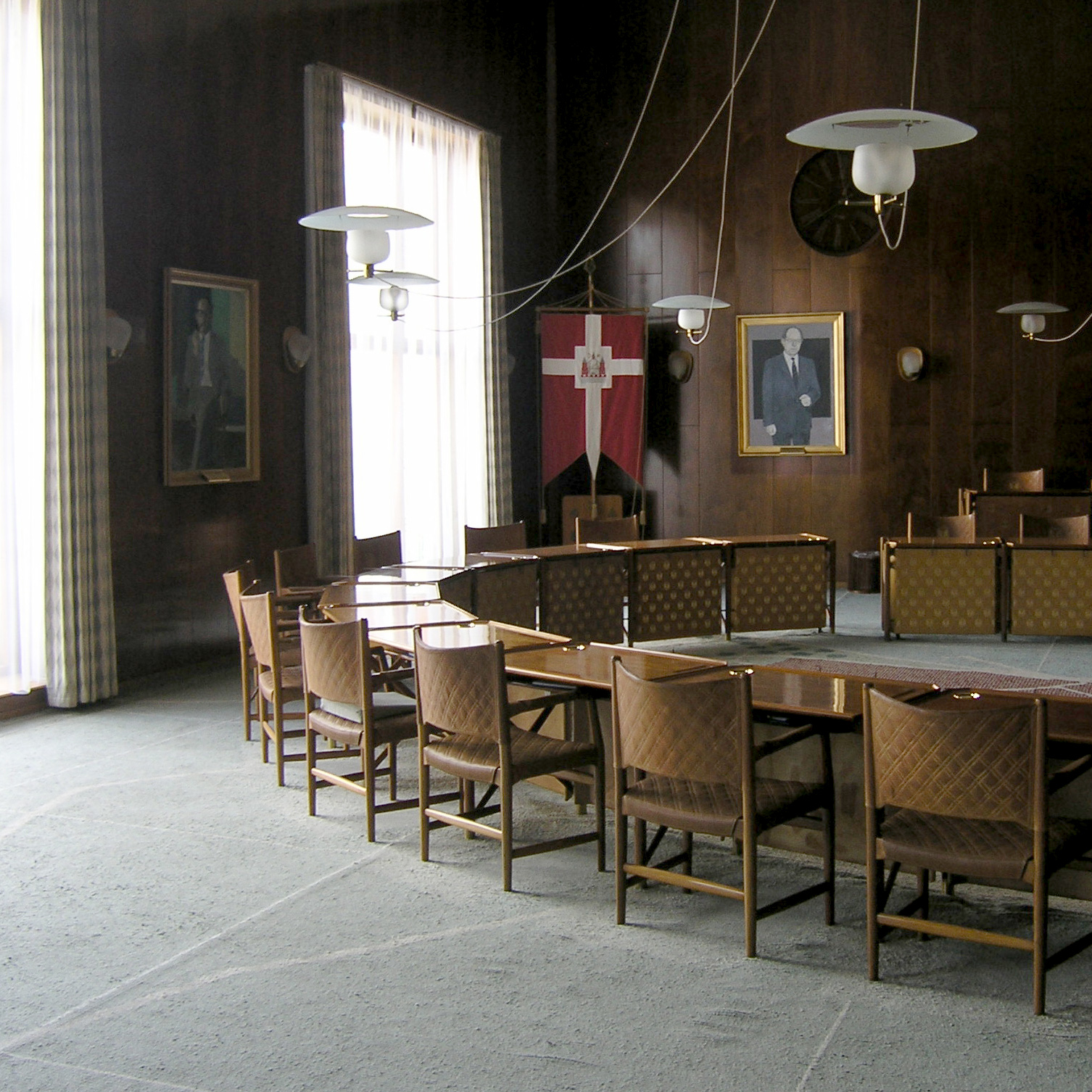
Interior and chairs of the Council Chamber room in the Aarhus City Hall

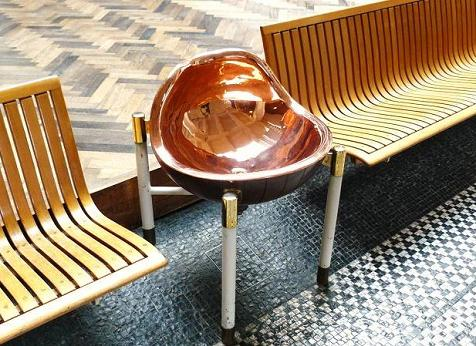
Fountain and seating at Aarhus City Hall

In 1940, Wegner made what could be called the two most pivotal relationships in his life. The first one was a personal relationship. He met Inga Helbo, a secretary in Jacobsen's office, and they were married on 9 November 1940. The second relationship was professional. Orla Mølgaard-Nielsen played another vital role in Wegner's life by connecting him with master cabinetmaker Johannes Hansen.

After finishing the Aarhus City Hall project, Wegner was unable to return to Copenhagen due to travel restrictions during Nazi occupation. Wegner never did return to school to complete the carpentry program and, as a result, he never received instruction from the "father of Danish modern furniture design" Kaare Klint (who taught the final part of the program). He continued to work for Jacobsen until 1943 when he opened an independent studio in Aarhus. He designed for Mikael Laursen during this time. He was later employed by his classmate Børge Mogensen, who was the head of furniture design for FDB Møbler (a division of the Danish cooperative FDB).

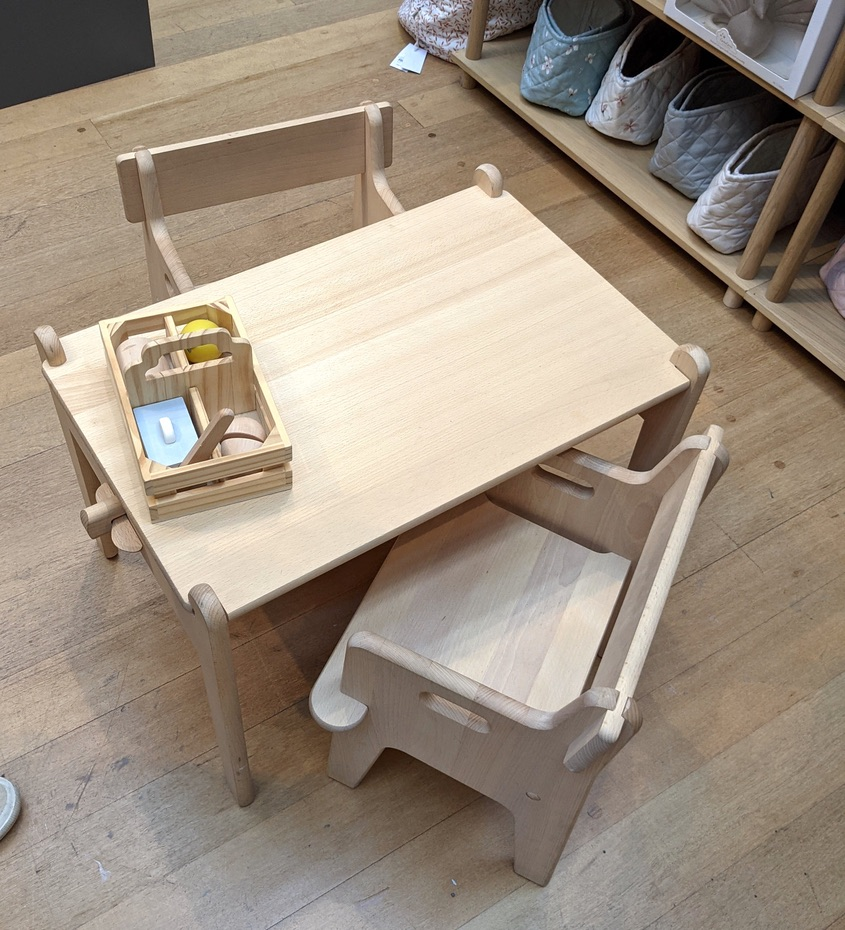
Peter's Chair and Table

In 1944, Wegner created the Peter's Chair (CH410). Wegner was looking for a christening gift for Børge Mogensen's son, Peter, but he was unable to find one because resources were limited under Nazi occupation. Instead, Wegner designed a children's chair himself. The chair was composed of four pieces that fit together like a three-dimensional puzzle, without the need for any adhesive or fasteners. Impressed with the design, Mogensen put the chair into production and sold it at FDB. The chair and an accompanying table that Wegner later designed are still in production today under Carl Hansen & Søn.

For Johannes Hansen's booth in the 1944 Cabinetmakers' Guild exhibition, Wegner created what might be considered his most decorative and most laborious piece: the Fish Cabinet. The exterior of the cabinet followed Kaare Klint's strict functional style with a rational geometric shape and little decorative elements. The interior, however, is an elaborate display of an underwater scene. Due to its technically demanding intarsia design, Johannes Hansen would not agree to produce the cabinet. Wegner decided to produce it himself using a pocket knife, which took three weeks to assemble all of the roughly 3,000 pieces of wood.

Wegner would only complete a few items for FDB Møbler before he was recruited by one of FDB's subcontractors, Fritz Hansen. He created the China Chair series for Fritz Hansen in 1944. While living in Aarhus, Wegner spent much of his time at the library where he learned about different furniture movements and styles. He saw a Chinese chair in a book by Ole Wanscher that served as inspiration for this chair series. Two of the four China Chairs would go into production.

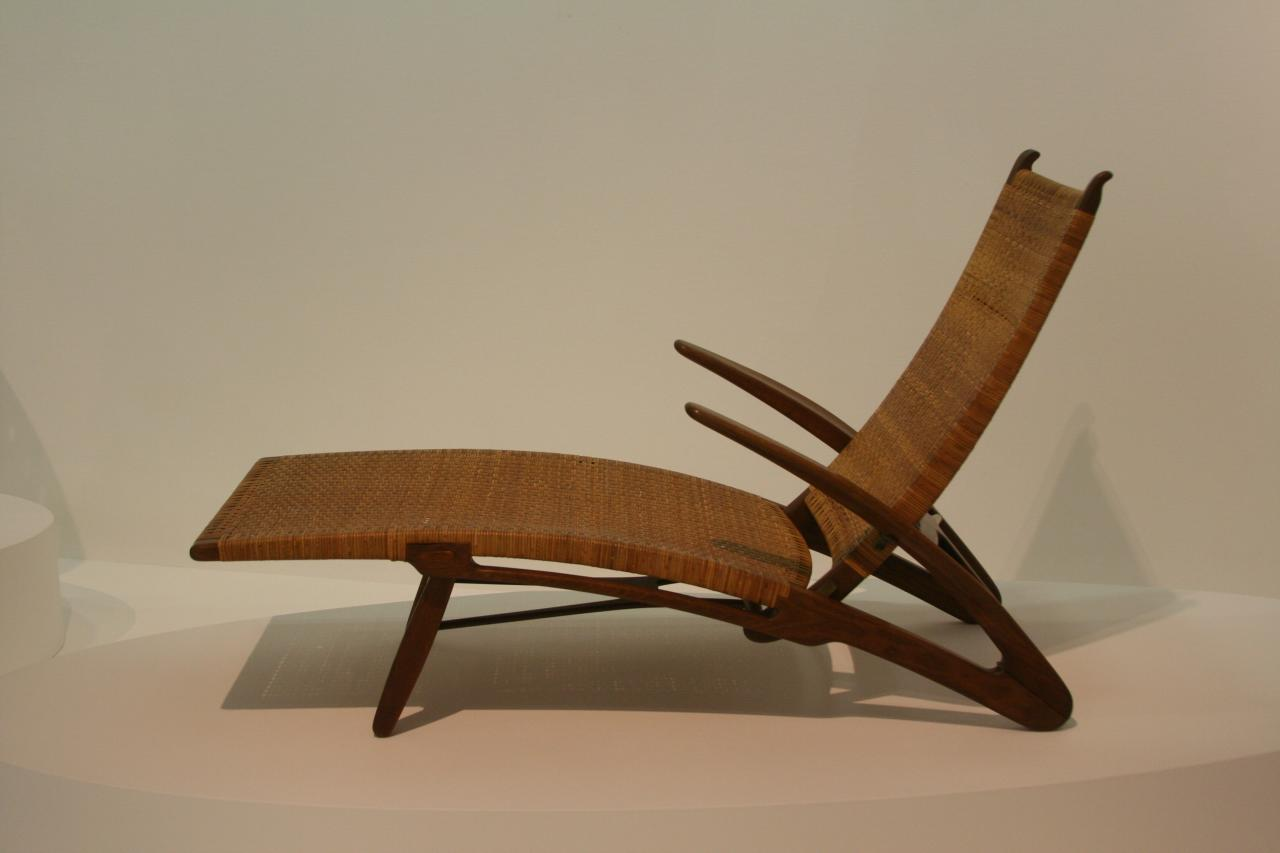
Dolphin lounge chair in the Centre Pompidou, Paris

=== Return to Copenhagen and international success ===
Wegner returned to Copenhagen in 1946 where he accepted a teaching position at the Danish School of Arts and Crafts at Mølgaard-Nielsen's suggestion. Wegner also worked for Palle Suenson's studio while teaching, where he was primarily responsible for renovating and designing furniture for the M/S Venus, a ship which had been damaged by the Germans during the occupation.

In 1947, Wegner designed the Peacock Chair for Johannes Hansen.

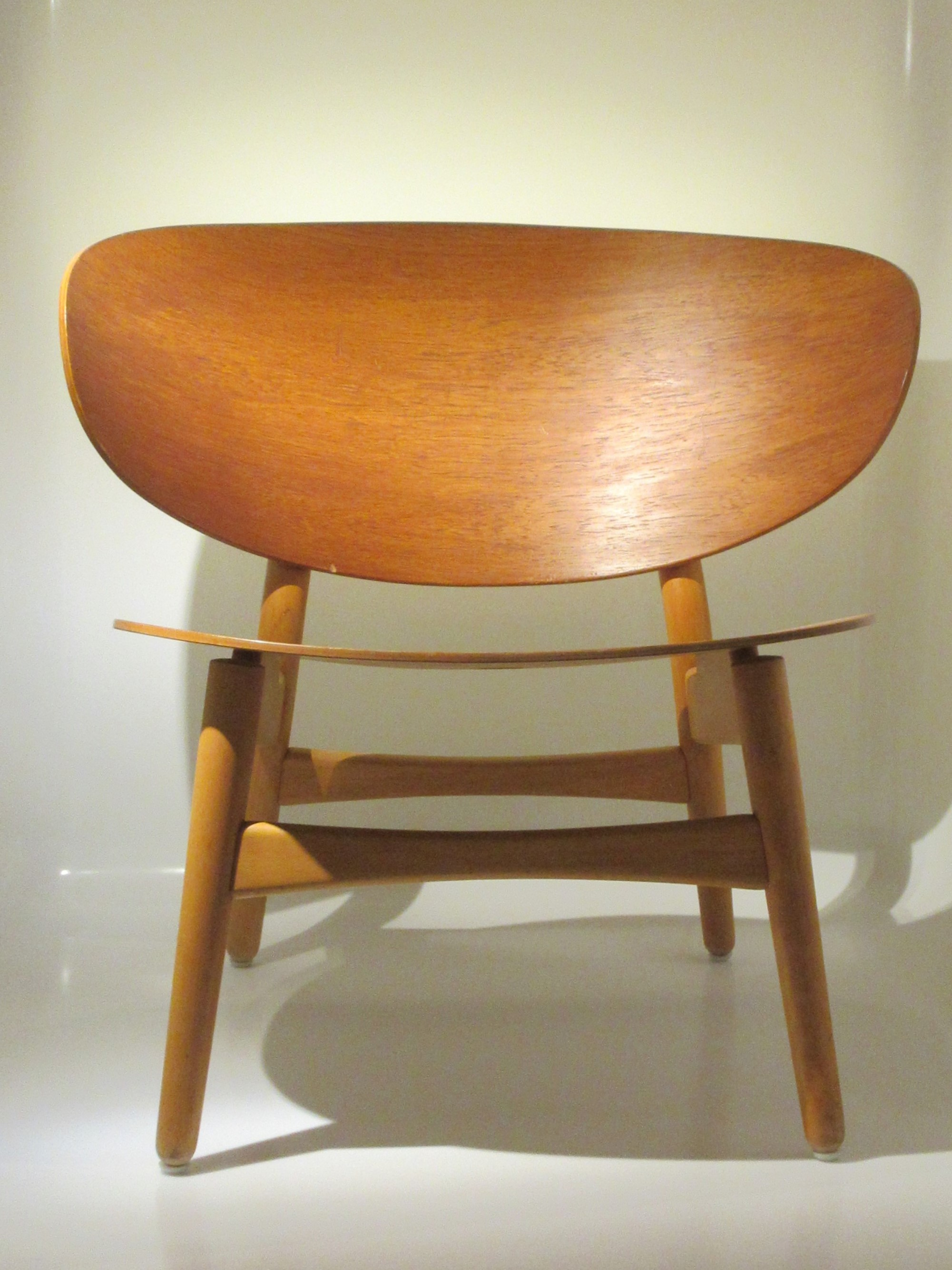
FH1936 – Designed for Fritz Hansen

Wegner began to experiment with molded plywood in 1948. Plywood had become popularized as a furniture material by the Eames and Alvar Alto and many designers were drawn to use this new lamination technology. That year, he submitted designs for a plywood chair in the MoMA's International Competition for Low Cost Furniture Design. His first shell chair (FH1936) as well as a bench version (FH1935) went into production for Fritz Hansen that same year.

Wegner's two most notable works, the Round Chair and the Wishbone chair, both came in 1949. That year, Wegner presented three chairs for the annual exhibition of the Copenhagen Cabinetmakers' Guild while employed by Johannes Hansen: a three-part (tripartite) plywood shell chair, the Folding Chair, and the Round Chair. The Danish press that attended the event initially paid attention to the tripartite chair. While the tripartite chair had captured the attention of the Danish press, American journalists attended the event for the first time and were drawn to the Round Chair. The American journalists shared the news of this chair back home and it became was the subject of much attention internationally. The American magazine Interiors featured the chair in their piece on the event and christened it "most beautiful chair in the world." This was the first coverage of Danish Modern in the American press.

That same year, Wegner also created the Wishbone Chair. Carl Hansen & Søn commissioned Wegner to create a chair that was both high quality and able to be mass produced. Wegner presented 4 chairs designs for Carl Hansen: CH22, CH23, the Wishbone Chair (CH24), and CH25. While all the chairs went into production the following year, the Wishbone Chair became his greatest commercial success and has remained in continuous production.

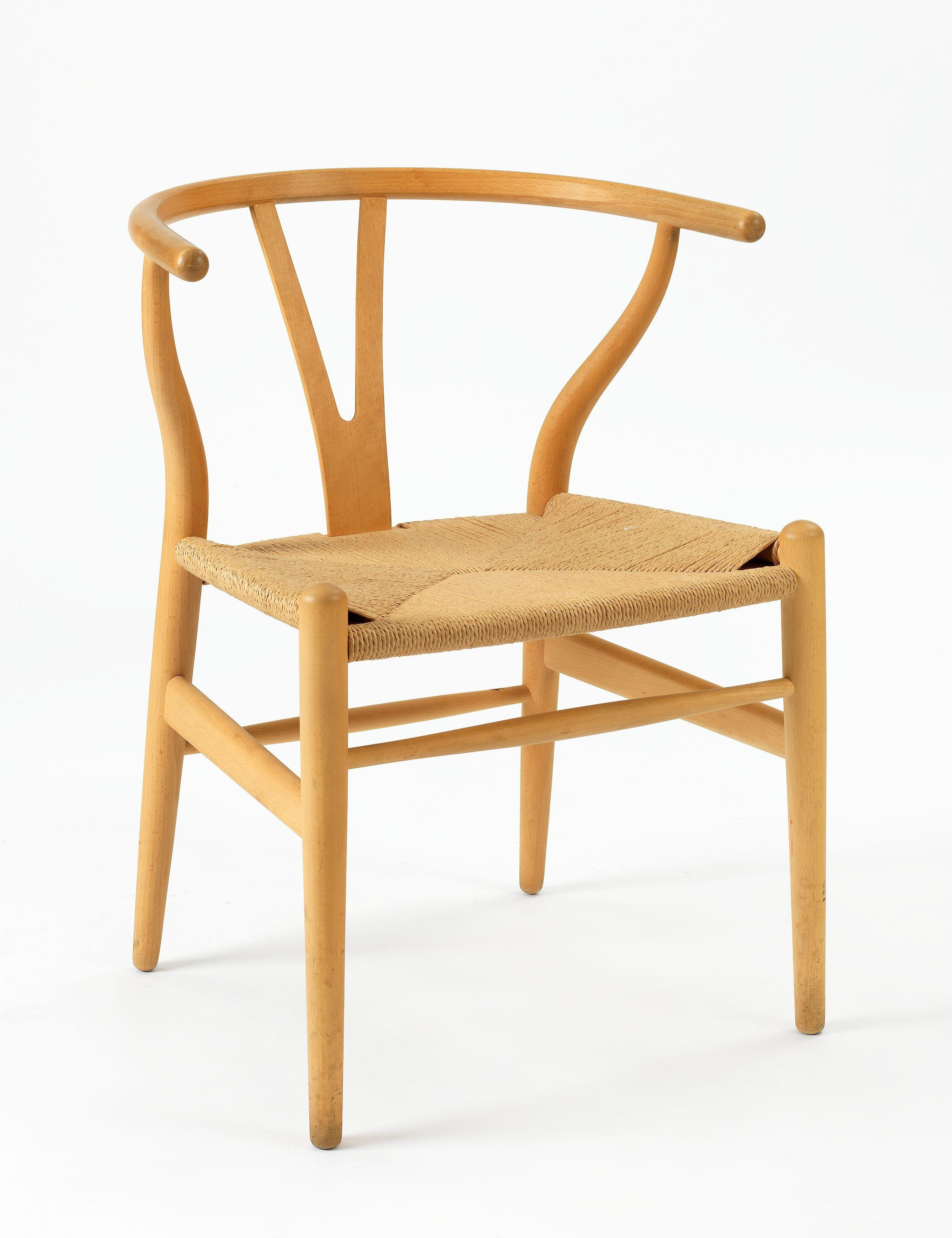
The Wishbone Chair

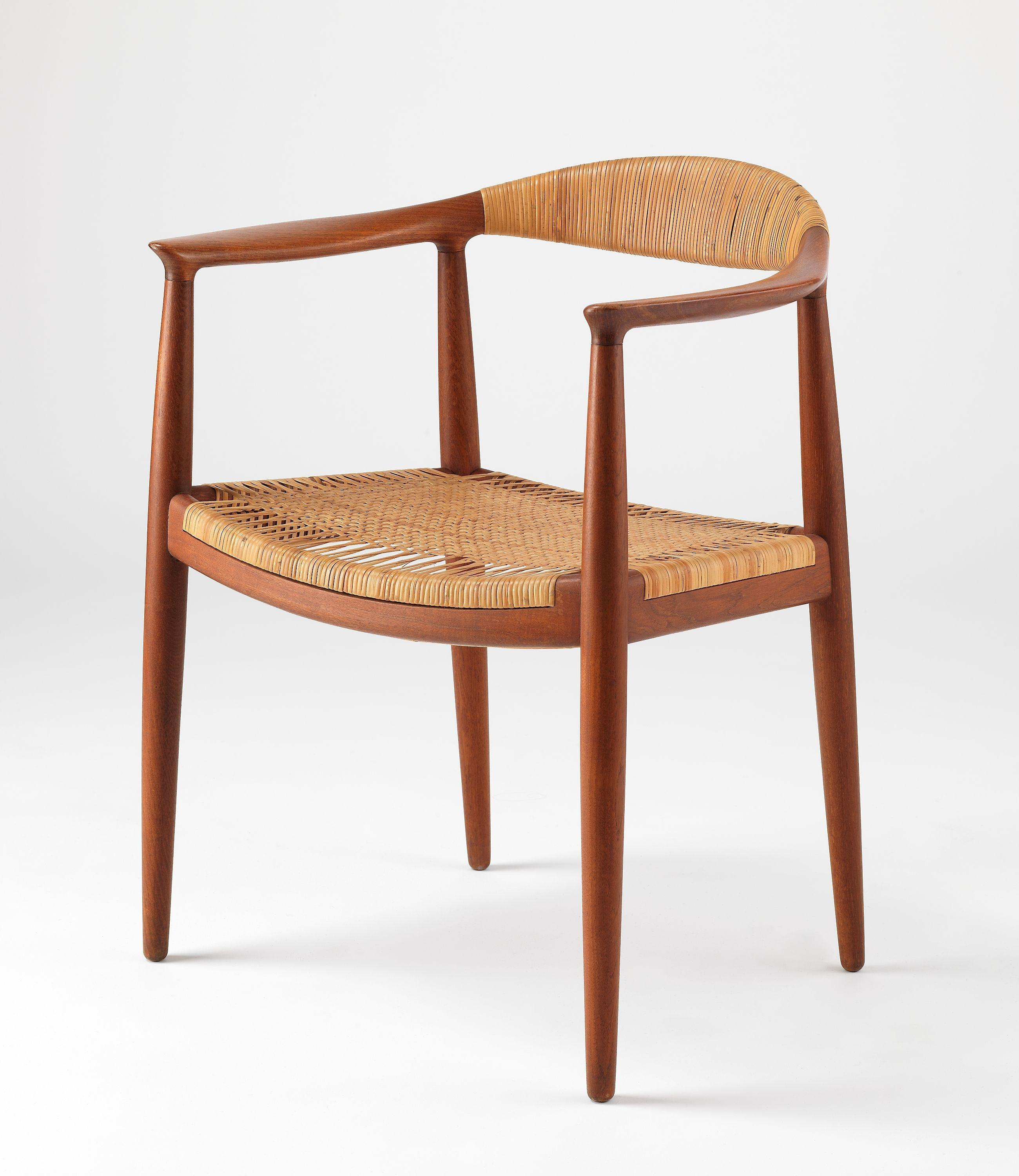
The Round Chair

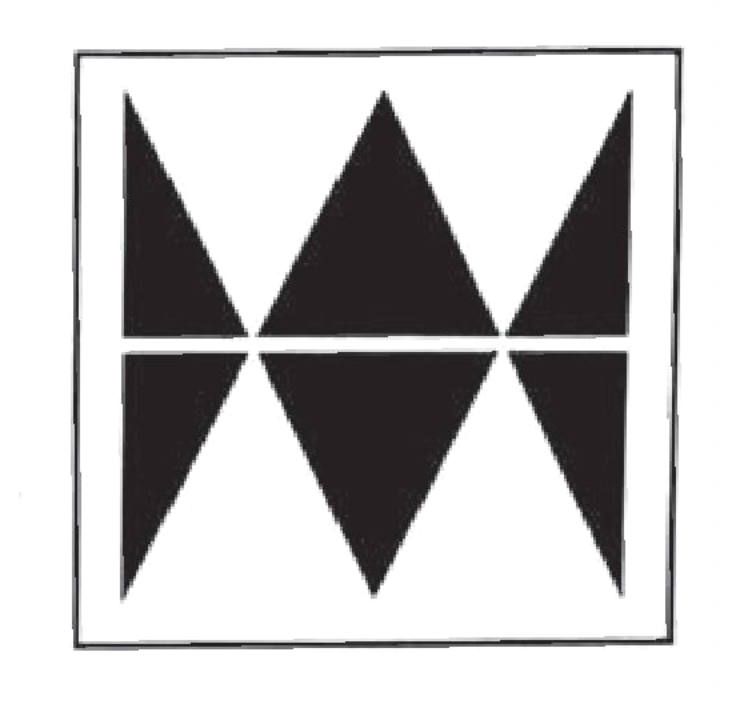
Logo for Salesco A/S. The logo represented an "H" and "W" for Hans Wegner.

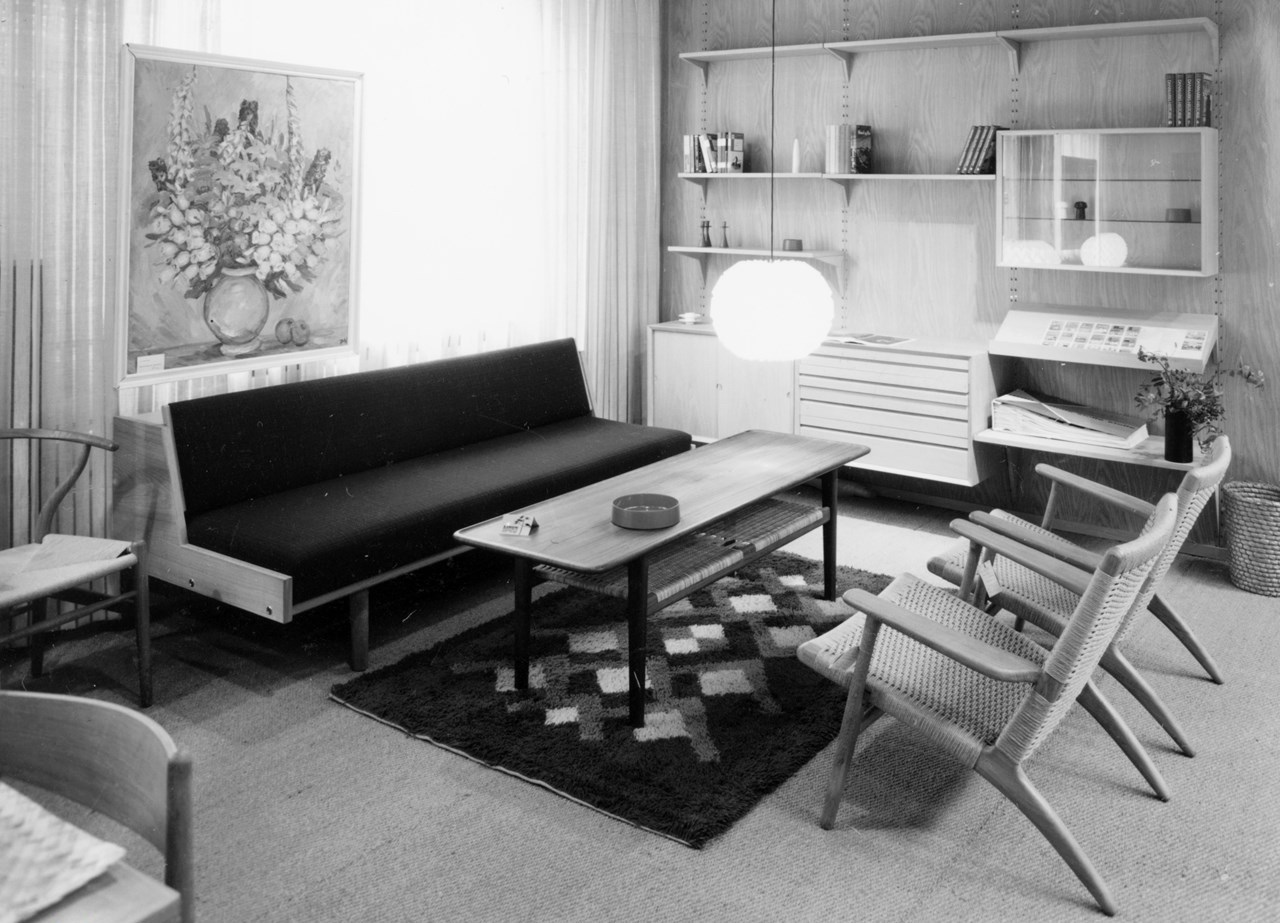
Wegner's furniture on display in 1964. Arrangement contains pieces by Salesco's members Getama, Carl Hansen & Søn, and Andreas Tuck.

In 1951, Ejvind Kold Kristensen created Salesco A/S, a company that exclusively promoted Wegner's work both domestically and abroad. Seeing the large potential for commercial success abroad, Salesco was a partnership between five of Wegner's preferred manufacturers, each with their own specialty, that would benefit from the shared marketing and sales resources to bring Wegner's works to more customers. The five manufacturers were Ry Møbler made bookcases, desks, and bulky items; A.P. Stolen made large upholstered furniture; Getama made furniture with loose cushions; Andreas Tuck made tables; and Carl Hansen & Søn made chairs. The company would allow Wegner to produce works across many factories at mass production and not be dependent on annual exhibits to market his works. With this centralized business, international purchasers only needed to visit a single showroom on Rygårds Alle in Copenhagen to see all of Wegner's Salesco collection. This organization made in possible for Wegner's work to proliferate without the designer having to worry about the production and export networks.

In 1951, Wegner won the inaugural Lunning Prize along with Finnish designer Tapio Wirkkala. The prize money allowed Wegner and his wife to take a three-month study tour to the United States and Mexico. The couple took the trip in 1953 after their two daughters were old enough to stay with their grandparents. Wegner witnessed the industrialized furniture production of the US but preferred to adhere to Denmark's traditional methods and rejected multiple offers, including one from Raymond Loewy, to move his furniture production to the US. Wegner stayed with Edgar Kaufmann Jr. at Fallingwater during the trip.

In 1959, Frederik Lunning hosted a retrospective of Wegner's work at Georg Jensen in New York.

Ten years after its initial release, the Round Chair became the subject to even greater attention and more accolades when chosen for the seating of the first televised U.S. presidential debate between Richard Nixon and John F. Kennedy on 26 September 1960.

From 1962–1963, Wegner works with architects Allan Jessen and Arne Karlsen on designing his family home and design studio in Gentofte.

=== Supplier issues and decline in popularity ===
US imports of Wegner's furniture declined in the late 1960s due to an ill-fated deal with Georg Jensen, Inc (the New York agency for Georg Jensen and a premier retailer for Danish home goods). In this agreement, Salesco gave Georg Jensen exclusive distribution rights within the United States. Georg Jensen added a hefty premium on all of Wegner's furniture which frustrated interior designers who balked at paying 3–4 times the retail prices in Denmark. When Georg Jensen shuttered in 1968, the US was left without a distributor for Salesco's five manufacturers. Johannes Hansen was not a member of the organization and was unaffected by this.

The issues with the Georg Jensen deal were happening in the backdrop of a much larger and looming issue facing Danish furniture imports. In the late 1960s through the 1990s, Danish furniture suffered from an exhausted international market, a surge in low quality furniture from Denmark that lessened its allure, and rampant plagiarism from abroad. The newer trends like bean bags, Eero Aarnio's Ball Chair from Finland, and the Memphis Group's colourful furniture from Italy were now seen as more appealing. In addition to changes in style preferences, customers' shopping habits had changed to favor affordable and lower-cost furniture over a single investment that would last their lifetime.

In 1969, the Knoll furniture company acquired the U.S. distribution rights for the Wegner designs manufactured by Johannes Hansen in Copenhagen. The collection included over a dozen chairs and a cabinet design.

A New York Times article noted "[Danish furniture] went out of style. [...] After being widely acclaimed and acquired, it was copied and cheapened and then replaced by those whose business is marketable novelty and change." The furniture industry in Denmark suffered greatly. The Cabinetmakers' Guild Exhibition, which Wegner presented new designed with Johannes Hansen, held its final event in 1966 after too few cabinetmakers remained in Copenhagen to sustain it. Wegner's furniture manufacturers fared better than others during this time but many eventually closed down: Andreas Tuck closed in 1972, A.P. Stolen went bankrupt in 1974, and Johannes Hansen would close in the 1990s.

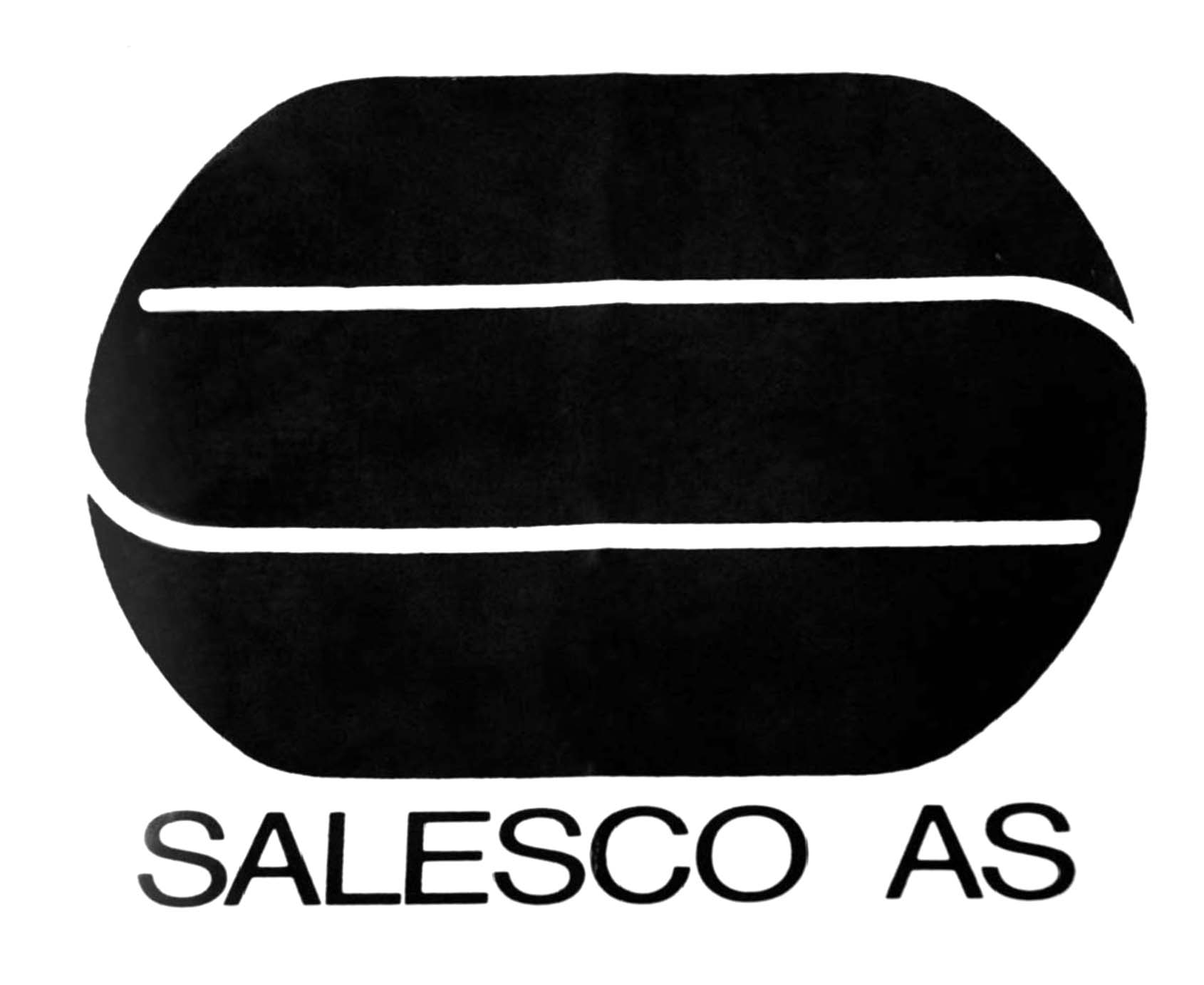
Salesco's updated logo after parting with Wegner

The Salesco collaboration with Wegner would collapse in 1969. There are differing opinions on what led to this breaking point. In a book published by Carl Hansen & Søn on their corporate history, the author attributes Wegner's dissatisfaction to Salesco managing director Henning Foss-Pedersen's attempt to influence what products Wegner designed and dictate which manufacturers got assigned to new designs. In the biography on the founder of PP Møbler, the breakdown is also attributed to rivalries between the five manufacturers and that Salesco started to work with other designers. Wegner gave the Salesco board of directors an ultimatum: choose him or Foss-Pedersen. Salesco chose Foss-Pedersen due to a very large severance package in his contract. Wegner vowed he would never again set foot in any of the Salesco companies; the companies would continue to manufacture any existing designs items but Wegner would not create new furniture for them. Wegner kept his promise and never worked with any of these companies again. To further distance the company from its former collaborator, Salesco updated their logo to feature an "S" instead of Wegner's initials.

Getama left Salesco before the falling out. Wegner initially took Salesco's side and told a newspaper that it would be difficult to continue to work with Getama. However, Wegner changed course after he parted with Salesco and continued to produce furniture for Getama. Getama and Wegner saw continued success in their residence halls furniture series designed for Denmark's growing university population.

=== Later years and revival ===
After the fallout with Salesco, Wegner became more attached to PP Møbler. PP Møbler was a supplier to A.P. Stolen but didn't produce furniture under its own name. From 1962 to 1968, Wegner used PP Møbler workshop to create prototypes and experiments; when successful, the designs would go into production with other manufacturers like Getama and A.P. Stolen. In 1969, he urged the company to produce under its own brand name and his first chair especially for PP Møbler (PP201). Wegner also designed their logo. As Wegner's other manufacturers closed down, he moved production of many pieces originally designed for Andreas Tuck, A.P. Stolen, and Johannes Hansen to PP Møbler.

Wegner's later work under PP Møbler took a distinctive turn from his earlier designs. His chairs began to look more Scandinavian, functionalist, and Apollonian. He started using lighter coloured woods as foreign and exotic woods became less appealing to consumers. To appeal to consumers interests, many of Wegner's early designs PP inherited were released in lighter woods (like maple) instead of the darker woods (like teak) with which the designs were originally produced. A signature characteristic of many chairs created for PP Møbler is a light wood chair with an inlay of darker wood in the top rail. This can be seen in the PP201, PP62, PP63, and PP701.

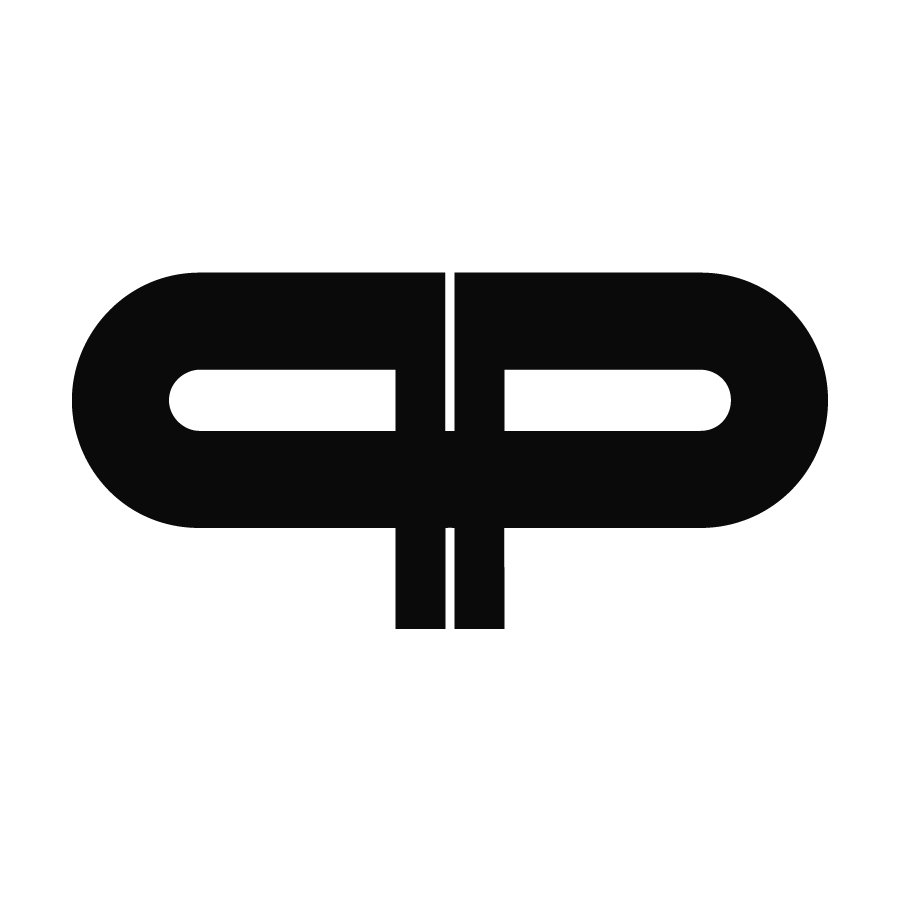
Wegner's logo for PP Møbler

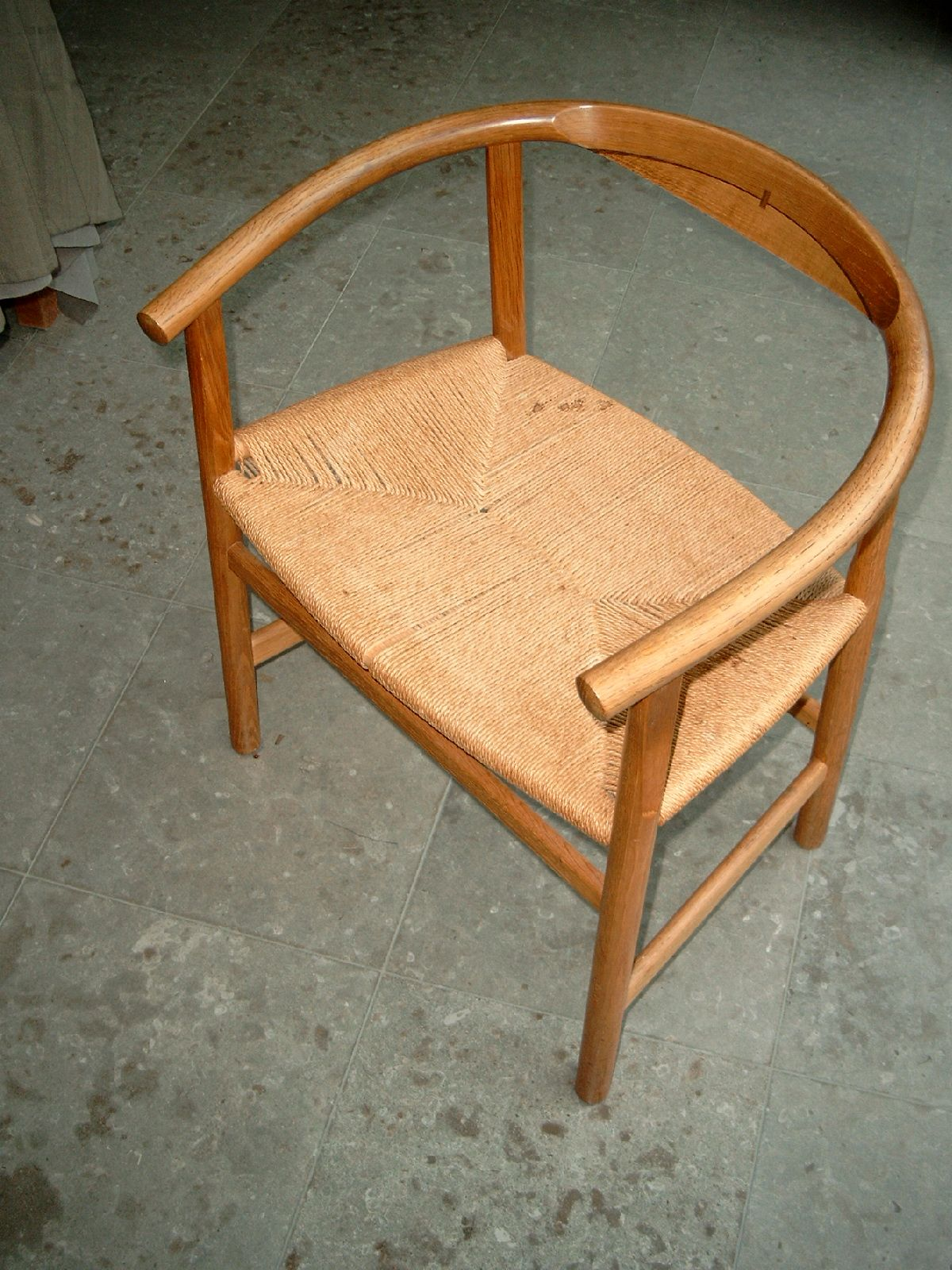
PP201 Chair

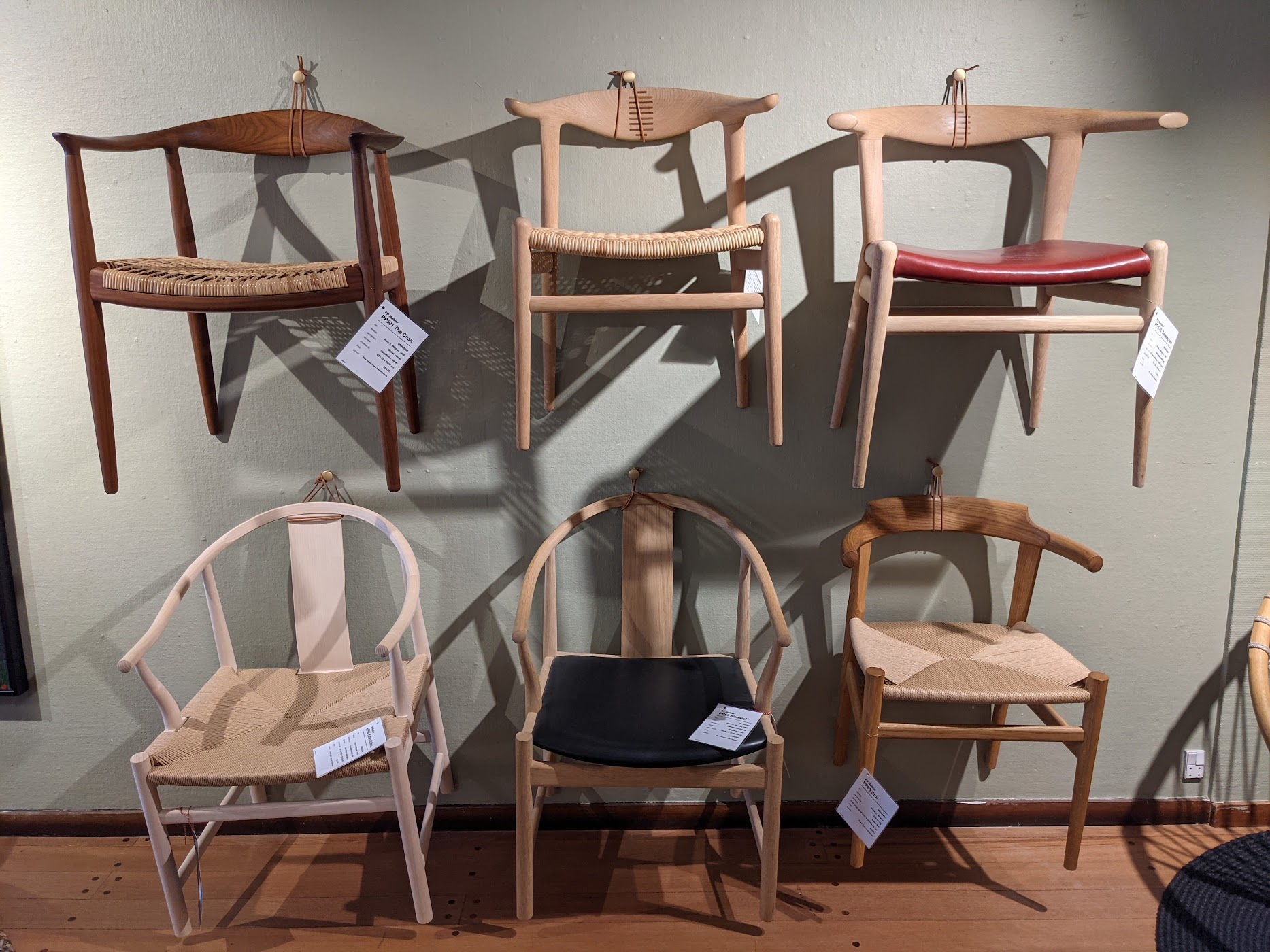
PP Møbler display at Illums Bolighus

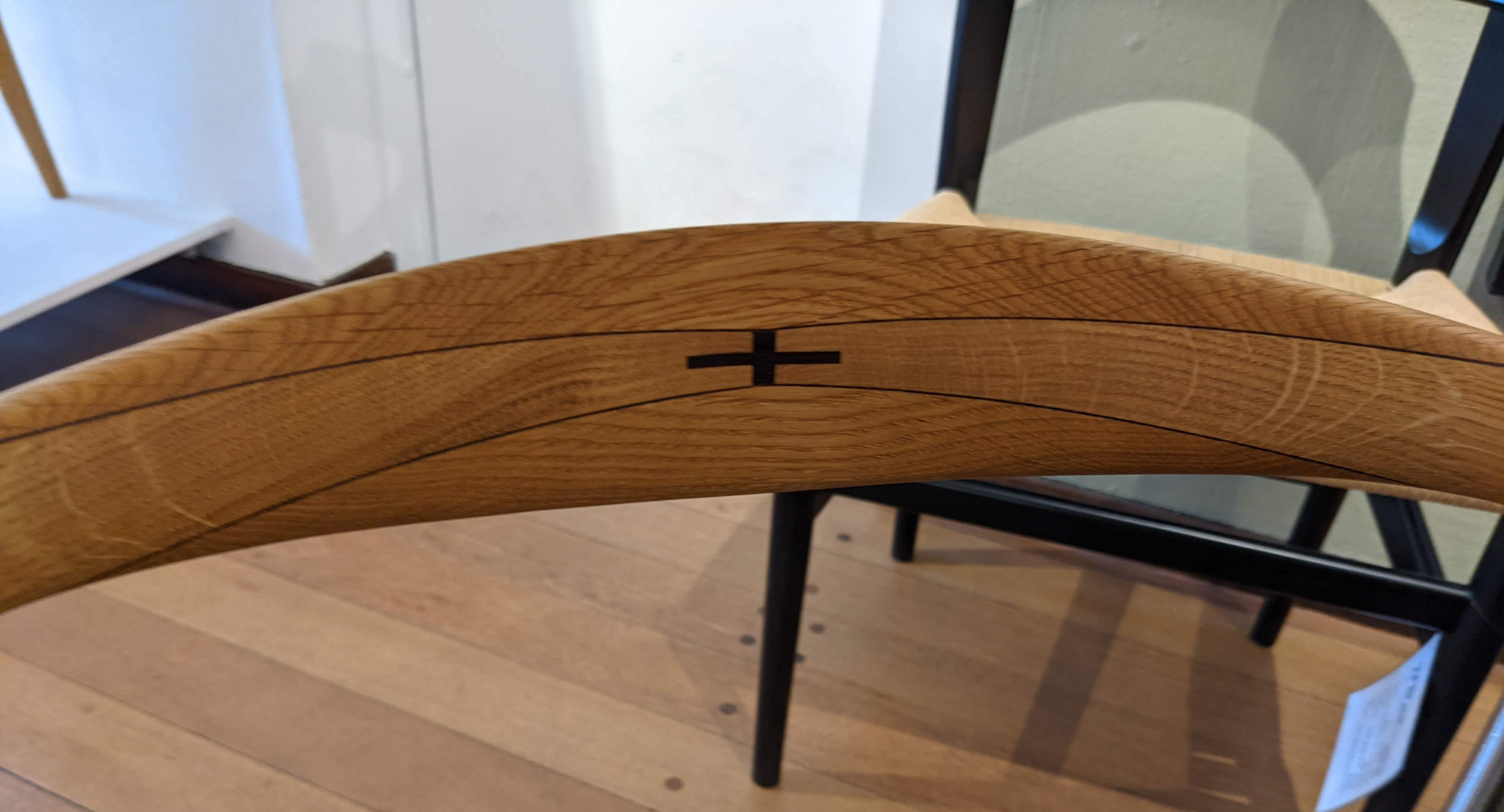
Dark wood inlay in PP701

Wegner hired his daughter Marianne, who was also a designer, to work at his design studio in 1973. In 1975, they collaborated on creating a streetlamp for a Louis Poulsen design competition. The lamp, informally called the Wegner Lamp (Danish: Wegner lygten), won first place in the competition and can be found today around Tønder, Denmark.

Wegner Lamp
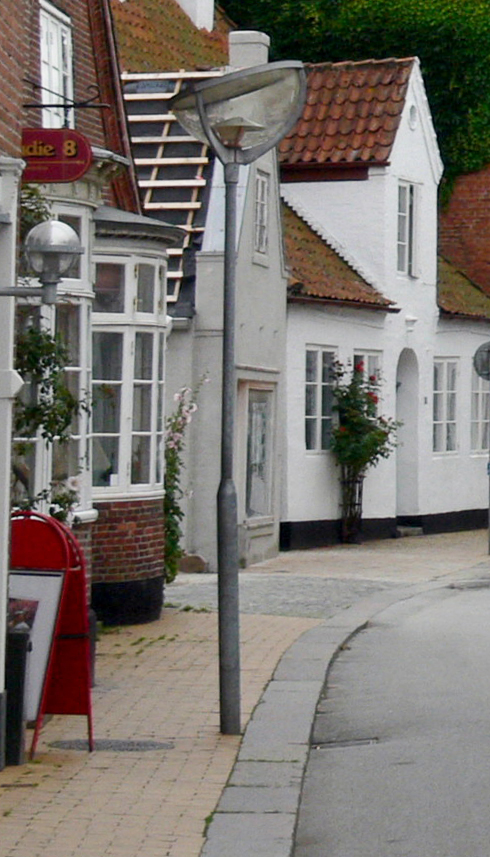
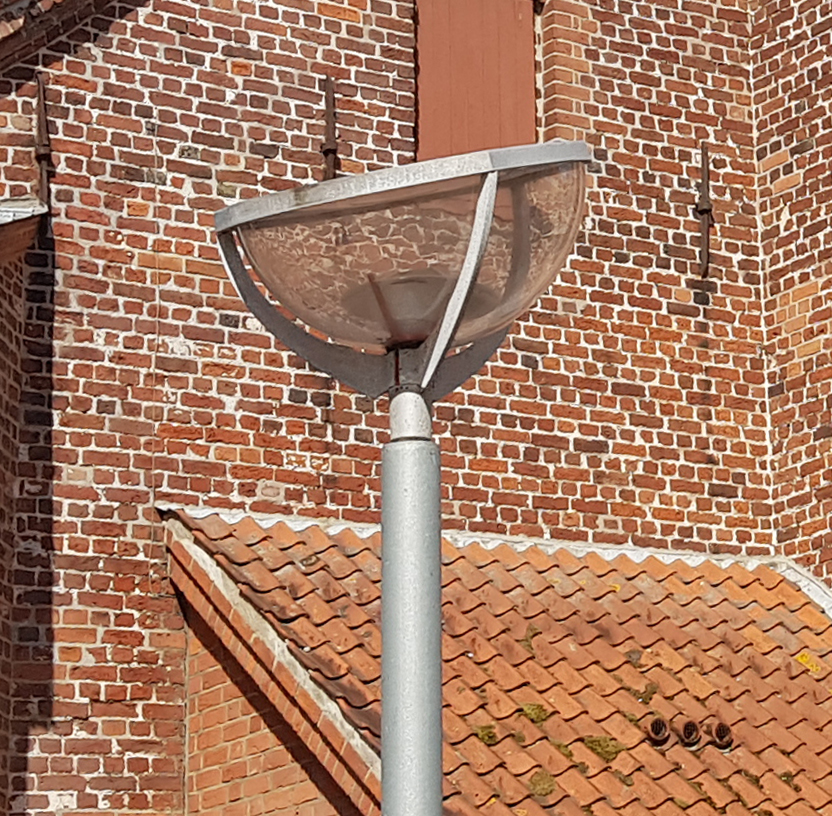

In 1978, DFDS commissioned Wegner and PP Møbler to create 800 chairs for the Dana Anglia ferry. The resulting chair (PP52/PP62 or the "Ferry Chair") has been regarded for its remarkable durability. In 1982, someone contacted PP Møbler for a replacement seat after they found a PP52 chair washed up on the west coast of Denmark. It turned out to be the version made exclusively for the ferry. Even though the chair had fallen off the ferry and traveled through the North Sea, the frame remained intact and only required a new seat.

In the late 1990s, Danish modern and the broader Mid century modern movement experienced a revival in international interest. Wegner, like many designers of the period, saw a surge of renewed interest in their work. Wegner's furniture was now in such demand that he was cited as "the man of the hour in a hot collecting market" in a 1998 New York Times article.

Permanent exhibit in Tønder

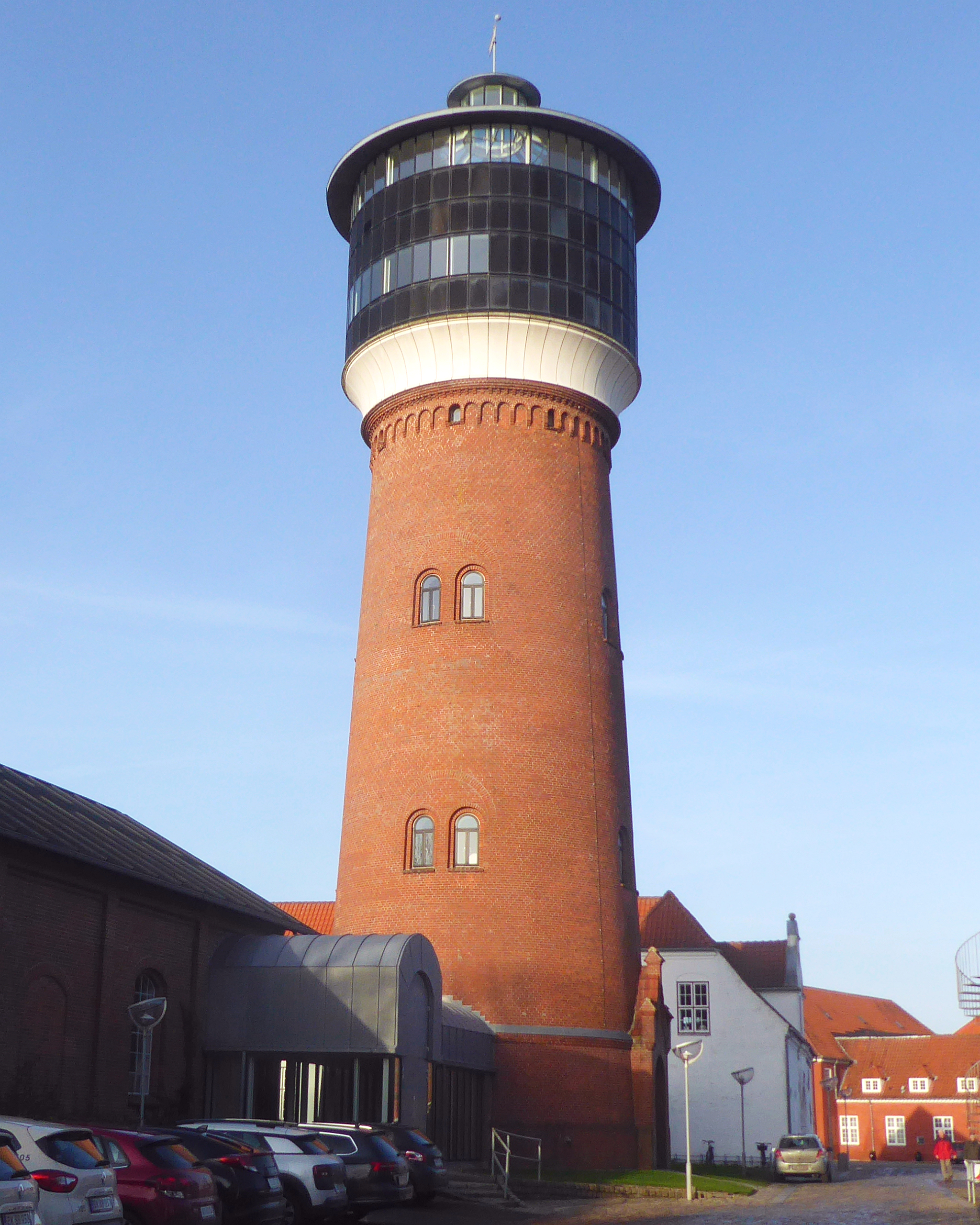
The water tower housing the exhibit

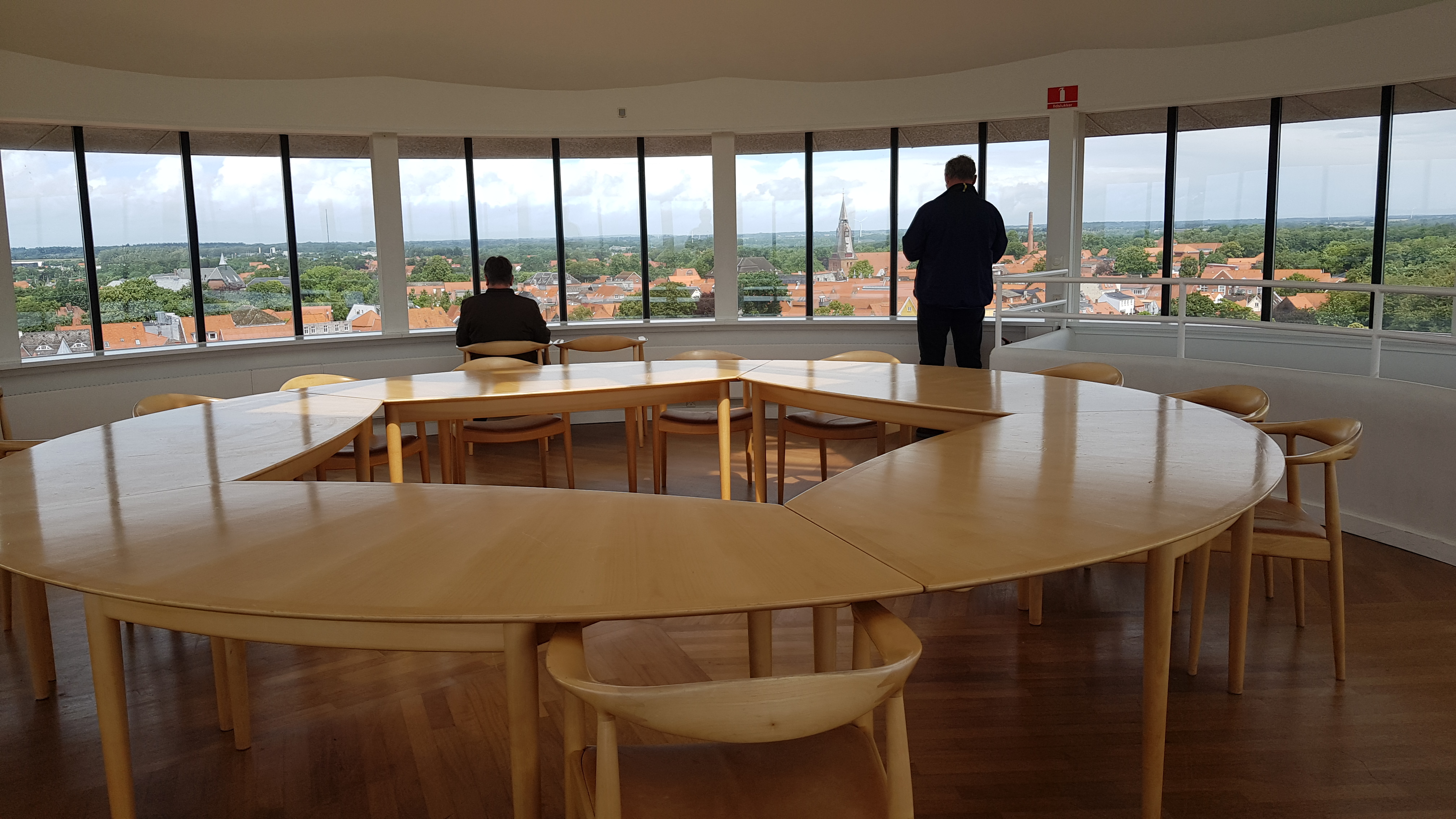
Round Chairs on the top floor of the tower

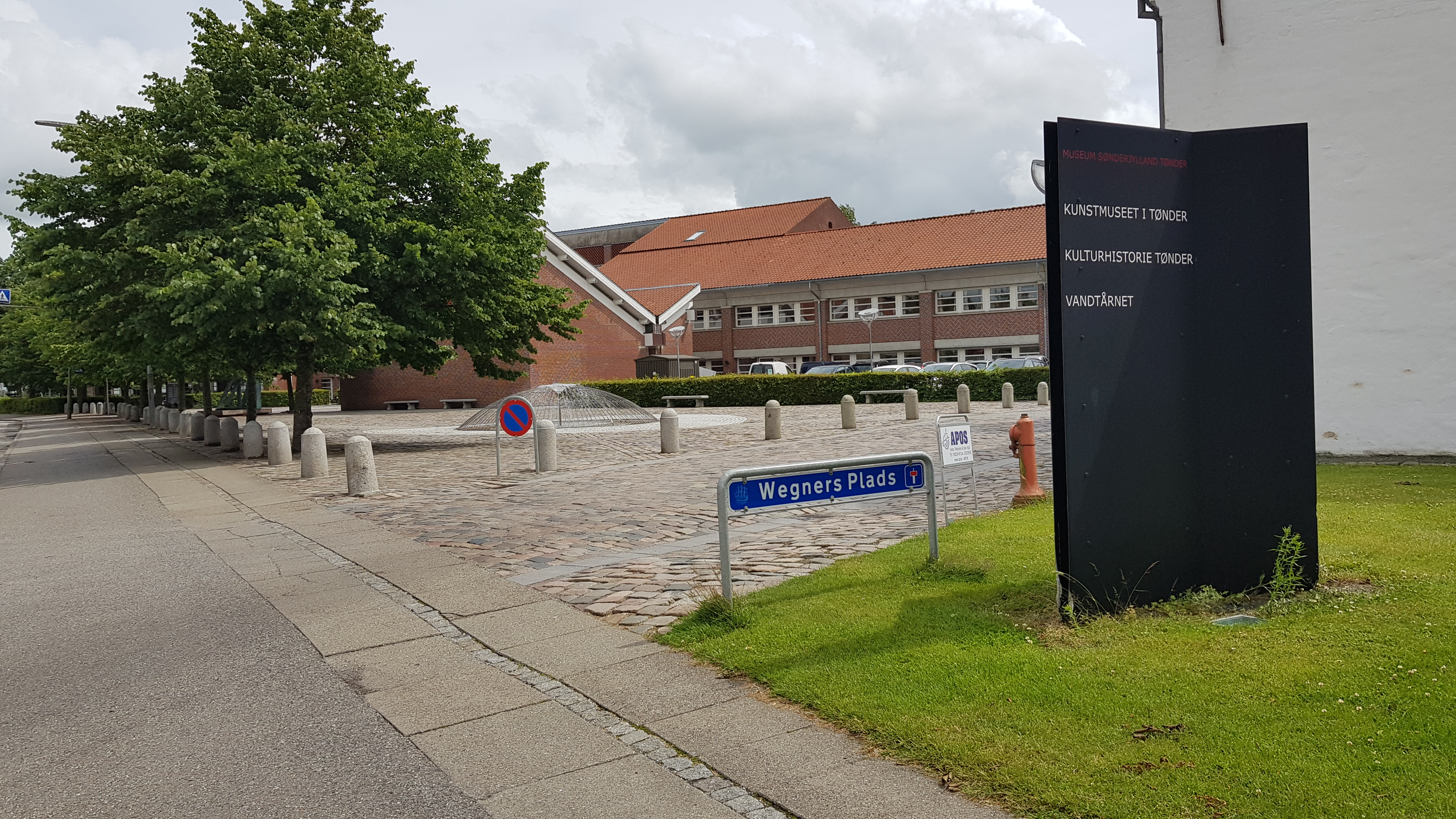
A sign for Wegners Plads ("Wegner's Square") outside the water tower

=== Retirement and legacy ===
As Wegner got older, his health started declining and he withdrew from work. Wegner retired in 1993 and his daughter Marianne took over his studio. Marianne said of Wegner's retirement, "Towards the end of the 1980s, I could feel that my father's energy level was faltering...but I was there to help out. I took on more and more tasks along the way. [...] He continued to draw some furniture until 1993, but after that, he couldn't really concentrate on the work anymore and he also had trouble walking down the stairs to the drawing room." He was placed in a nursing home in 2001 and started using a wheelchair.

In August 1995, Museum Sønderjylland opened a permanent exhibit of Wegner's work in the Tønder water tower. Wegner gifted 36 chairs for display on the exhibit which he felt comprised his best work. On 26 January 2007, Wegner died at the age of 92. In Wegner's own lifetime he was able to witness a surge of renewed interest in his work. PP Møbler and Marianne Wegner worked together to create an engraved oak headstone for his gravesite at Mariebjerg Cemetery in Gentofte.

Just One Good Chair exhibit
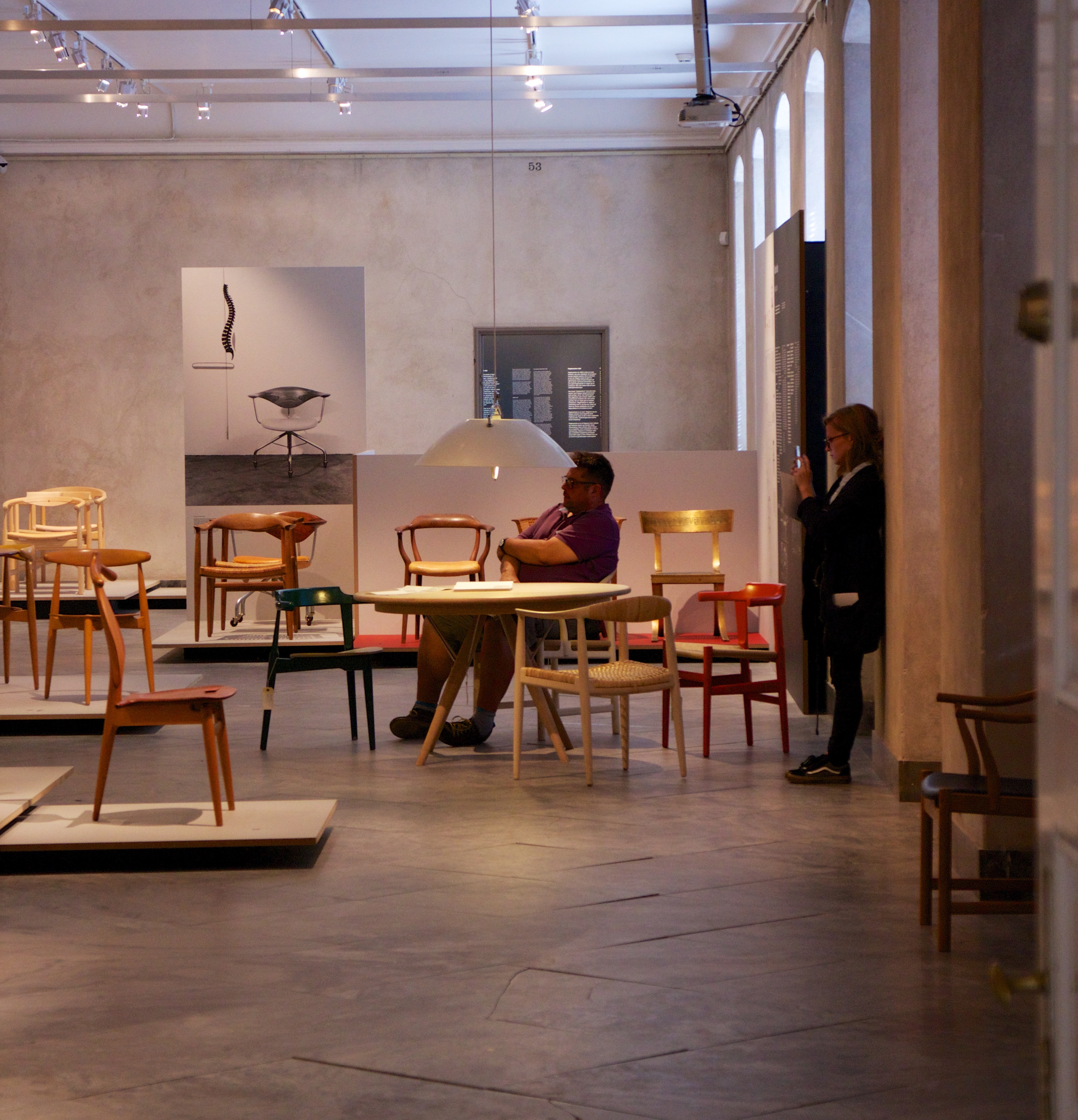
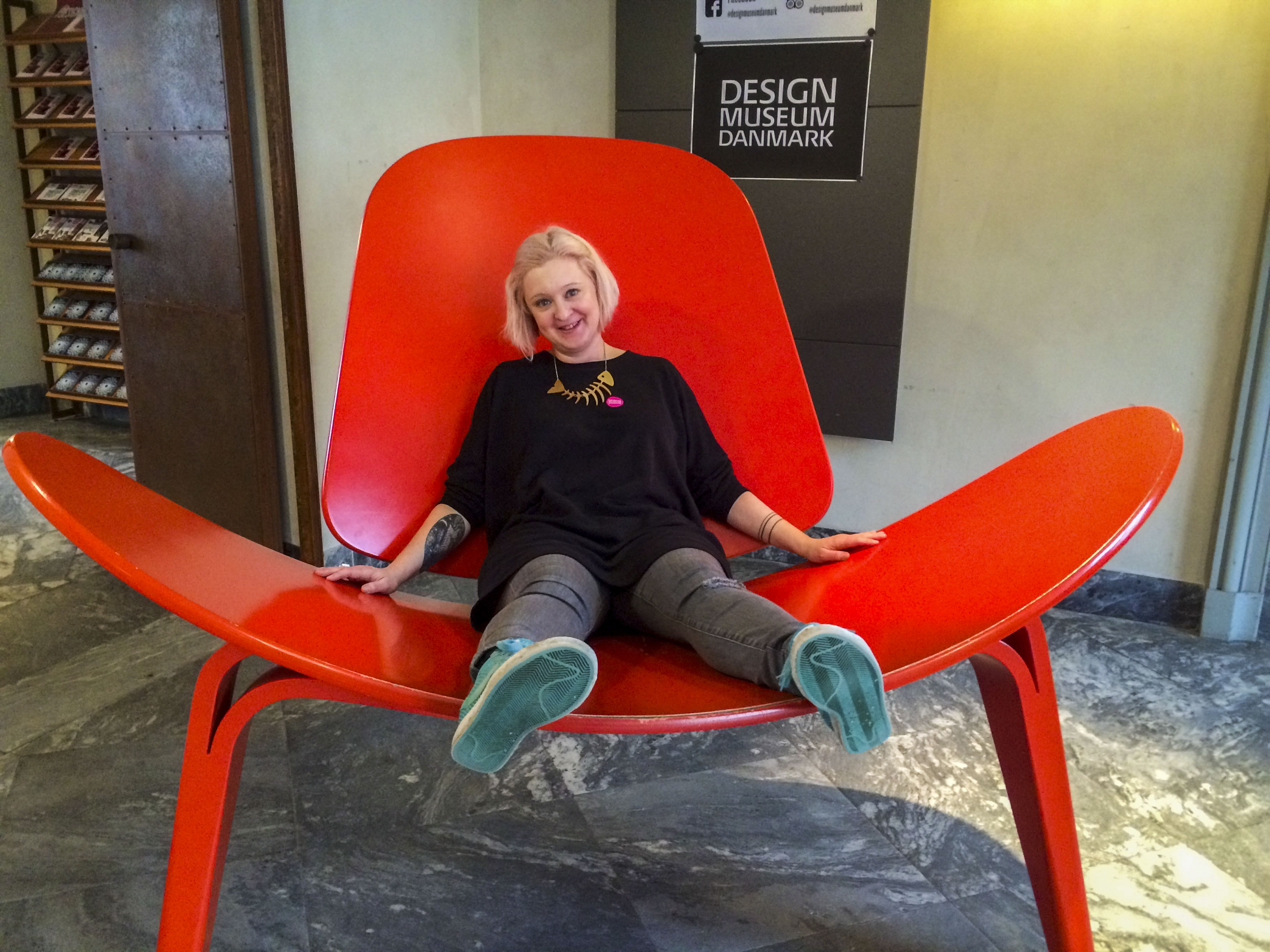
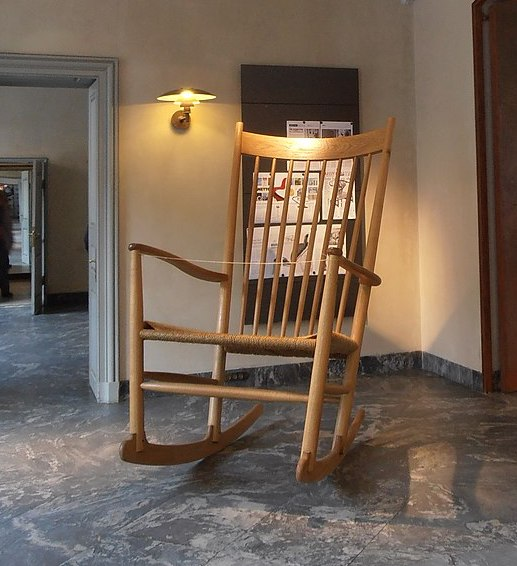
Top: The Just One Good Chair exhibition at Designmuseum Danmark. Bottom: An oversized version of Wegner's Shell Chair and J16 chair in the lobby of the museum, created for the exhibition.

To mark the 100 year anniversary of Wegner's birth in 2014, a series of events took place to commemorate the artist. Designmuseum Danmark opened the Just One Good Chair exhibition to showcase a retrospective of Wegner's work, as well as published an accompanying book in English, Danish, and German. The Art Museum in Tønder put on the "Hans J Wegner: A Nordic Design Icon from Tønder" exhibition, with an accompanying book of the same name in Danish and English. The Art Museum in Tønder also released Hans, His Chairs and The World, a children's book about Wegner's life. Post Danmark issued a commemorative stamp.

A number of Wegner's furniture was put into production in 2014 to mark Wegner's 100th birthday. PP Møbler released the Upholstered Peacock Chair (PP550) and Hammock Chair (PP135) and put the Tub Chair (PP530) into production for the first time. Carl Hansen & Søn released the CH88 chair and CH825 credenza.

Art Museum in Tønder and Tønder Municipality created the Wegner Prize in 2015 to recognize designers or institutions that have contributed to Wegner's memory or the development of Nordic design. Winners of the prize include Noritsugu Oda, Aarhus City Hall, Cabinetmakers' Autumn Exhibition, and PP Møbler, Getama, and Carl Hansen & Søn.

In February 2020, a group formed the Association for the establishment of a Museum for Hans J. Wegner (Danish: Foreningen til etablering af et museum for Hans J. Wegners møbelkunst) to explore creating an entire museum dedicated to Wegner in Tønder. The association plans to spend up to three years investigating the feasibility and seeking grants to bring the idea to life. Wegner's family has been supportive and offered up items from his design studio to display at the museum.

== Personal style and design characteristics ==
=== Use of wood ===
Almost all of Wegner's creations are made of wood. Having worked with wood from an early age and being trained as a cabinetmaker, the designer was very attached to this material. In addition to wood, Wegner also utilized other traditional construction materials like upholstery, caning, and paper cord. His style is known for taking traditional elements and pushing them to extreme tolerances and distillations. Unlike his contemporaries, Wegner did not focus on materials like fiberglass and plastics (Verner Panton), steel (Poul Kjaerholm), or polyurethane foam (Arne Jacobsen).

While Wegner preferred wood, he occasionally designed chairs that would not be possible with wood. For the Circle Chair (PP130), Wegner originally designed it with a steel ring because such a method for making the large ring from wood wasn't available in 1965, however, when it was finally put into production in 1985, PP Møbler was able to make it entirely from wood.

=== Variations on a theme ===
Round Chair leitmotif

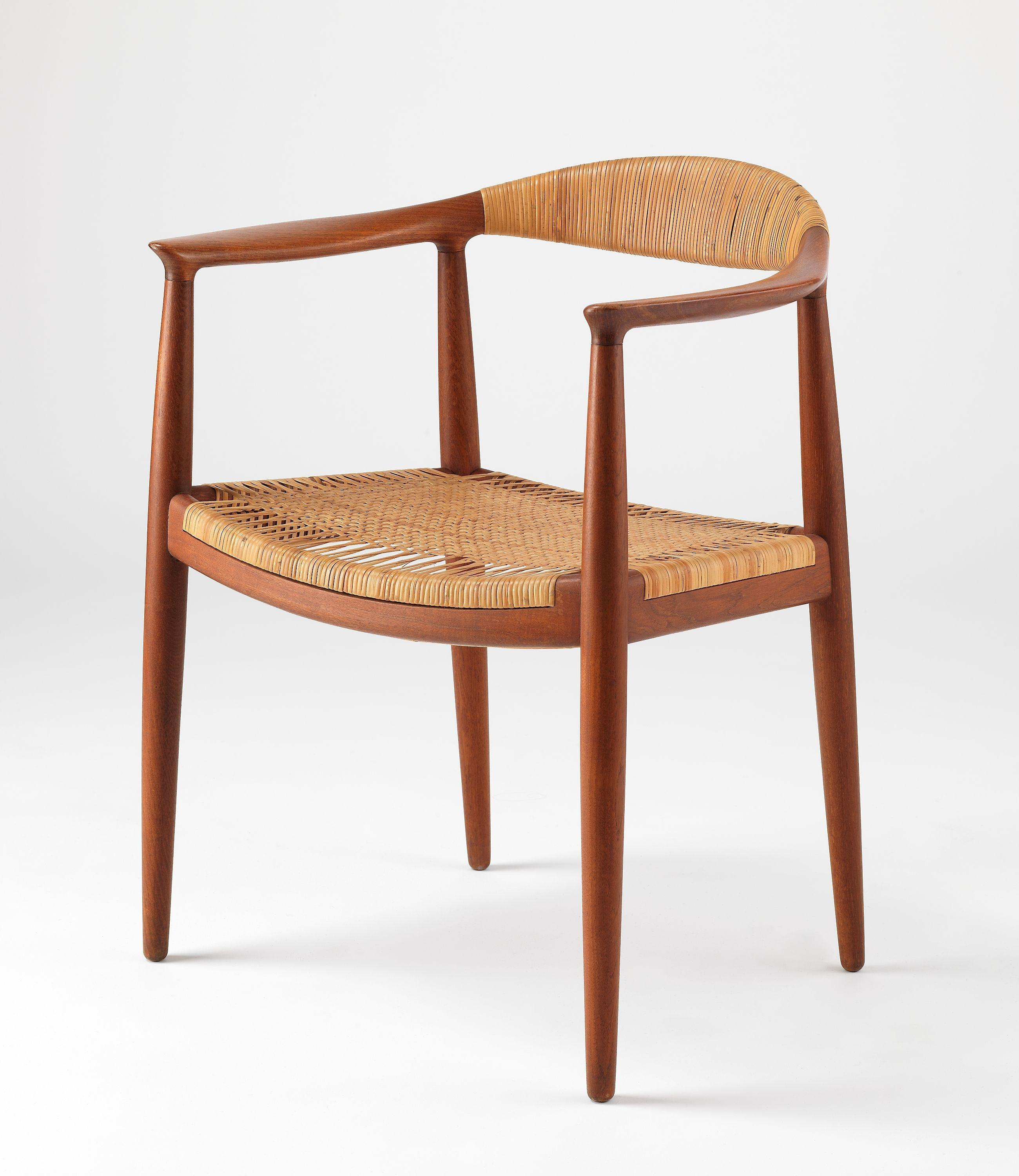
Round Chair

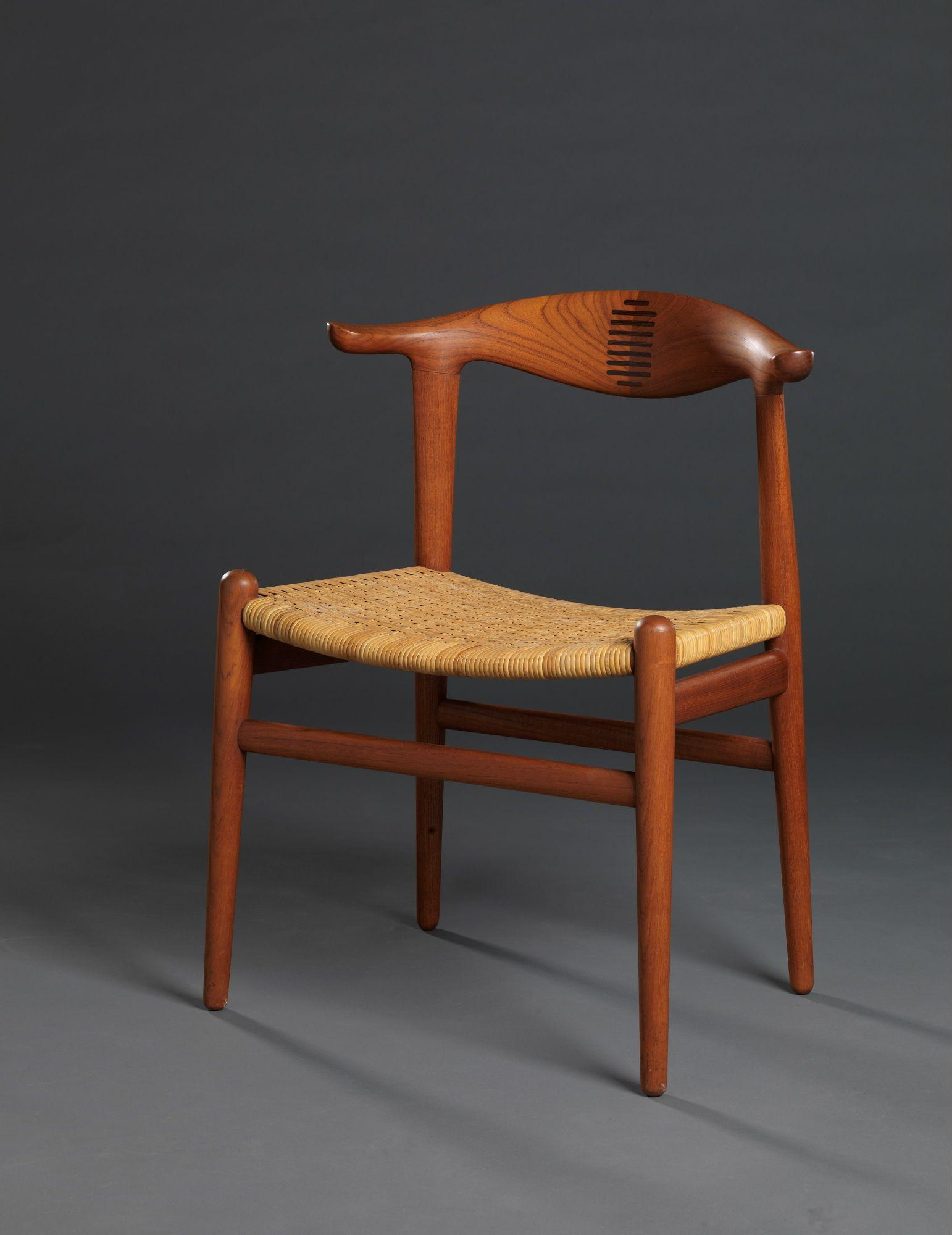
Cow Horn Chair

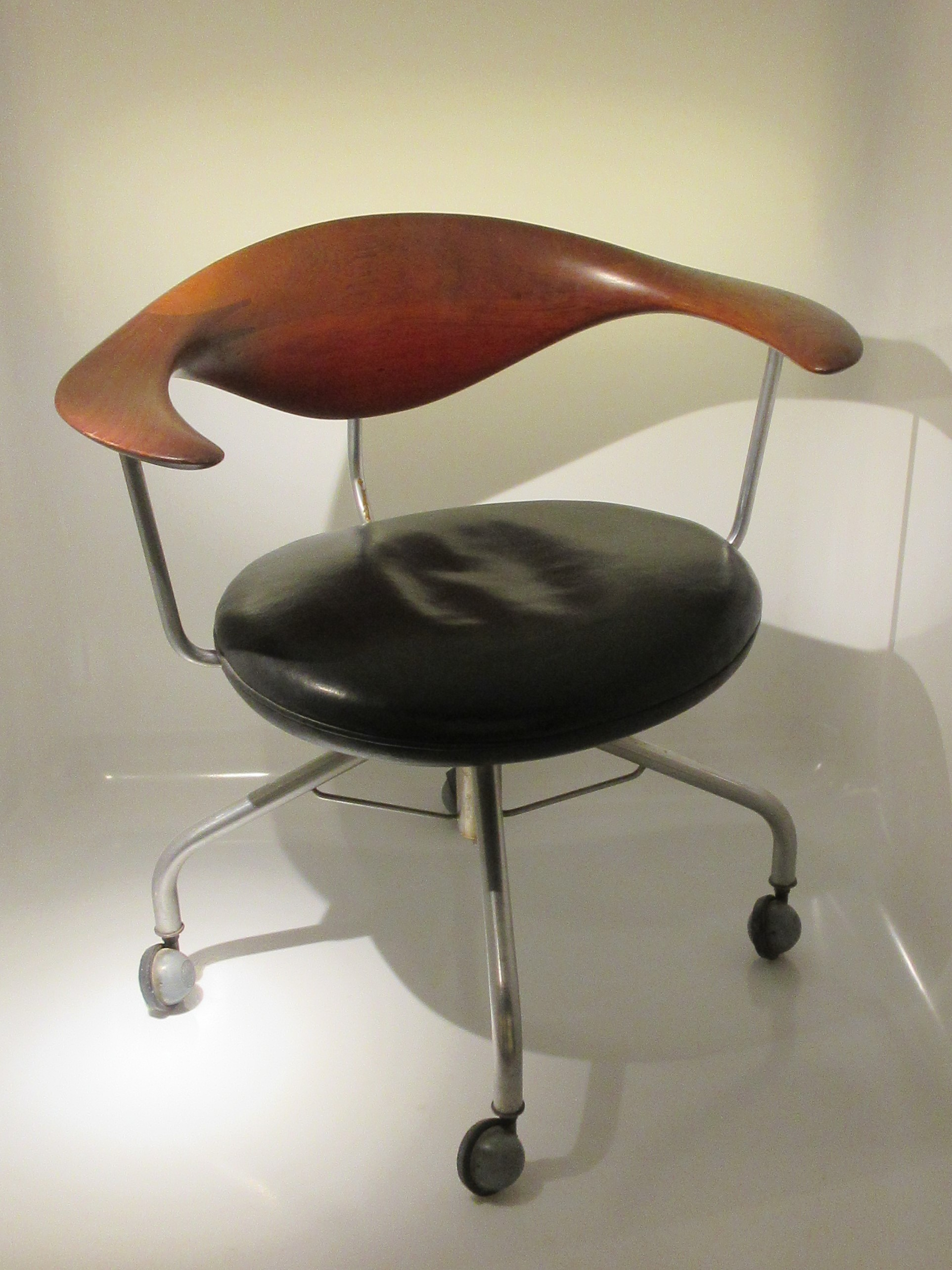
Swivel Chair

Wegner often drew upon his own designs to create new chairs. Many of Wegner's chairs borrow characteristics from his prior works. The Danish art critic Henrik Sten Møller named his 1979 book on Wegner Tema Med Variationer (English: Variations on a theme) after Wegner's tendency to return to earlier works and evolve them.

The Chinese Chair was created in 4 different versions. Later, the Wishbone Chair was based on the early Chinese Chair series. The Cow Horn Chair and Swivel Chair can trace their curved back to the Round Chair.

=== Adherence to traditional craftsmanship ===
Wegner said of his work, "I have always wanted to make unexceptional things of an exceptionally high quality." Many of Wegner's wooden chairs are characterized by traditional joinery techniques including mortise and tenons, finger joints, and sculpted elements such as armrests and seat supports. In the early models of the Round Chair, Wegner used a mortise and tenon joint to connect the arms at the middle of the backrest. Wegner was dissatisfied with the way that this looked and wrapped the backrest in cane to hide what he considered to be an unsightly design. Unhappy with this compromise and the deceptive illusion that the arms and backrest were constructed from a single piece of wood, Wegner later updated the design to use a zigzag patterned finger joint to connect the three parts. In the Peacock chair, the connection of the legs to the seat is accentuated by the use of a darker wood wedge in the mortise and tenon joint. These features emphasize the process involved in bringing the furniture together and help inform the user of the craftsmanship employed in his work.

=== Homage to historical works ===
In addition to an adherence to traditional craftsmanship, many of Wegner's pieces also paid homage to historical and traditional chairs. This can be seen in Peacock Chair which is based on a classic windsor chair and the Chinese Chair series which was inspired by Ming dynasty chair design. Wegner described his approach as "stripping the old chairs of their outer style and letting them appear in their pure construction."

== Notable designs ==
Image	Name and Description	Original Manufacturer (Current)	Year
	Rocking Chair (J16)	FDB Møbler (Fredericia)	1944
	Chinese Chair (no.1) / (FH4283), The China Chair series was inspired by a portrait of Danish merchants sitting in traditional Ming chairs. The first, produced by Fritz Hansen, is the closest to its source material: the back splat is sculpted into the arm rail, which terminates in a decorative curved finial.	Fritz Hansen	1944
	Chinese Chair (no.4) / (PP66), The 4th China chair is a cleaner distillation of the original form. It incorporates many distinctly Danish elements such as the floating seat support (on the upholstered model). Also present is the arched and planed back rail that appears on many subsequent Wegner chairs, including the Wishbone chair below.	Fritz Hansen (PP Møbler)	1945
	Peacock Chair The Peacock chair was inspired by a traditional Windsor chair. Wegner exaggerated the arched back, creating a high backed, yet airy chair. The back spindles are flattened in the approximate area of a person's shoulder blades, the visual result of which evokes a bird's tail plumage.	Johannes Hansen (PP Møbler)	1947
	The Round Chair The Chair best represents Wegner's design philosophy of "continuous purification...to cut down to the simplest possible elements of four legs, a seat, and a combined top rail and armrest" It rose to prominence in the 1960 televised debate between Richard Nixon and John F. Kennedy. Both presidential candidates sat in The Chair during the debate.	Johannes Hansen (PP Møbler)	1949
	Folding Chair (JH512) Lightweight with a cane seat, drawing on historic folding chairs. Wegner created a hook so the chair could be hung on the wall to save space.	Johannes Hansen (PP Møbler)	1949
	Wishbone Chair (CH24) The Wishbone chair was the first collaboration between Wegner and maker Carl Hansen, who has produced it since 1950. In 1944 Wegner began a series of chairs inspired by a portrait of Danish merchants sitting in traditional Ming chairs. The Wishbone chair is the last and most distinct of the series. The inspiration is clearly visible, but the chair is an original form. The back legs are steam-bent into a curve that tapers to join a circular steam-bent back rail. The joinery was difficult but resulted in a strong, lightweight chair.	Carl Hansen & Søn	1949
	Flag Halyard Chair (GE225) While Wegner often drew from historical forms he also created forms without precedent. The Flag Halyard was inspired by a trip to the beach, during which Wegner carved out the form in the sand. The metal, rope, and sheepskin chair is an unusual, but not unprecedented, break from Wegners prolific use of wood.	Getama (PP Møbler)	1950
	Papa Bear Chair (AP19) An upholstered armchair with exposed wood hand rests that evoke a bear's paws. Sometimes referred to as the Teddy Bear Chair.	A.P. Stolen (PP Møbler)	1951
	Sawhorse Easy Chair	Carl Hansen & Søn	1952
	Valet chair This chair has elements for hanging up or storing each piece of a man's suit. The backrest is carved to be used as a coat hanger, pants can be hung on a rail at the edge of the seat and everything else can be stowed in a storage space underneath the seat.	Johannes Hansen (PP Møbler)	1953
	The Swivel Chair (JH502, PP502) Wegner created this office chair inspired by Doctor Egill Snorrason's critique of how Danish furniture ignored ergonomics.	Johannes Hansen (PP Møbler)	1955
	Ox Chair, which came with or without horns, showed the less serious side of Wegner's designs. "We must take care," he once said, "that everything doesn't get so dreadfully serious. We must play—but we must play seriously." The Ox was Wegner's favorite chair and occupied a space in his living room until he died.	Johannes Hansen (Erik Jørgensen)	1960
	Shell Chair (CH07) While the chair was designed in 1960, it was only in production for a short time due to consumers' discomfort with the edgy design. The chair was later re-released in the 1990s and saw greater appeal with contemporary consumers.	Carl Hansen & Søn	1963
	Circle Chair (PP130) PP Møbler put the Circle Chair, originally designed in 1965 with a steel tube base, into production with a base made entirely in wood in 1985.	PP Møbler	1985

== See also ==
- Danish modern
- Danish design

== Works cited ==
- Holmsted Olesen, Christian (2014). Wegner: Just One Good Chair. Translated by Mussari, Mark. Copenhagen: Hatje Cantz. ISBN 978-3-7757-3809-5. OCLC 877852234.
- Motzkus, Frank C. (2008). By design: Carl Hansen & Son, 100 Years of Craftsmanship. Aarup: Carl Hansen & Son.
- Bernsen, Jens (2001). Hans J. Wegner (in Danish). Copenhagen: Dansk Design Center. ISBN 87-90904-24-9. OCLC 56079807.
- Hollingsworth, Andrew (2009). Danish Modern. Gibbs Smith. ISBN 978-1-4236-1359-6.
