= The Peacock Chair =

Chair designed by Hans J. Wegner in 1947

Peacock chair
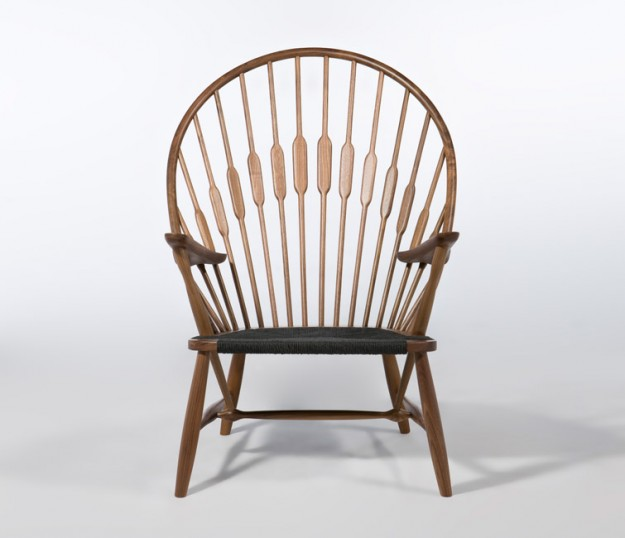
- Designer: Hans Wegner
- Date: 1947
- Made in: Denmark
- Materials: Oak, ash, paper cord
- Sold by: Johannes Hansen, PP Møbler

The Peacock Chair (Danish: Påfuglestolen) is a chair designed by Hans Wegner in 1947. It was originally produced by Johannes Hansen, but it is currently produced by PP Møbler under the model number PP550.

As it was characteristic of Wegner's furniture, the Peacock Chair borrows from the design of the traditional English Windsor chair. To add an element of design and to make the chair more ergonomic for the user's shoulders, Wegner chose to flatten the fan of spindles. When fellow designer Finn Juhl first saw the chair's characteristic flat spindle backrest, he was reminded of a peacock's tail and christened it the Peacock Chair.

Wegner also experimented with an upholstered version of the chair and displayed it at the 1953 Cabinetmakers' Guild Exhibition. It was never put into mass production in Wegner's lifetime, and only a handful were produced by Johannes Hansen. PP Møbler re-released the chair in 2014 to commemorate the 100th anniversary of Wegner's birthday. In 2018, Philips auctioned an early version of the upholstered chair with selling price of $68,750.

== Gallery ==
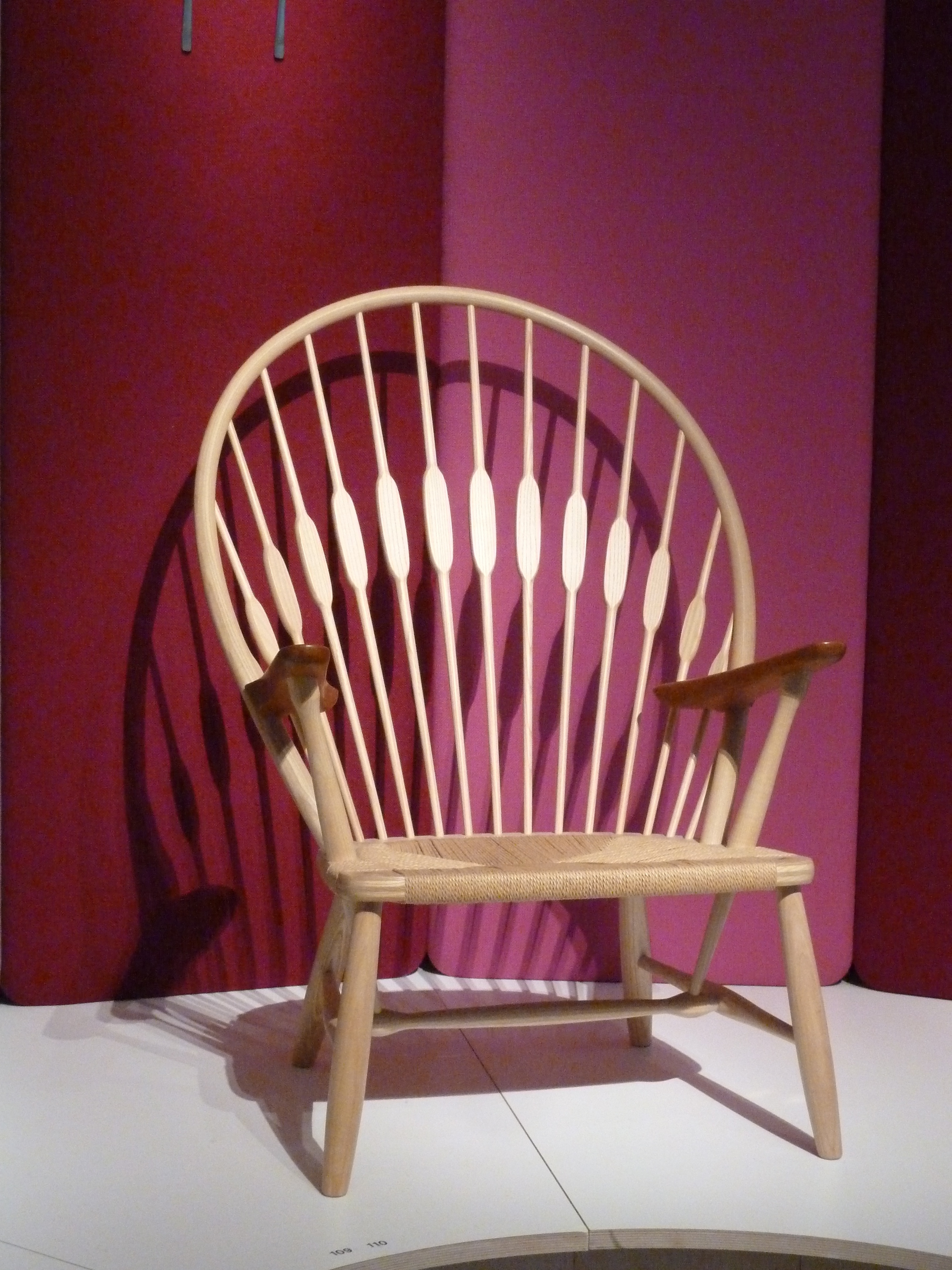
An early Peacock chair from 1947 at the Designmuseum Danmark

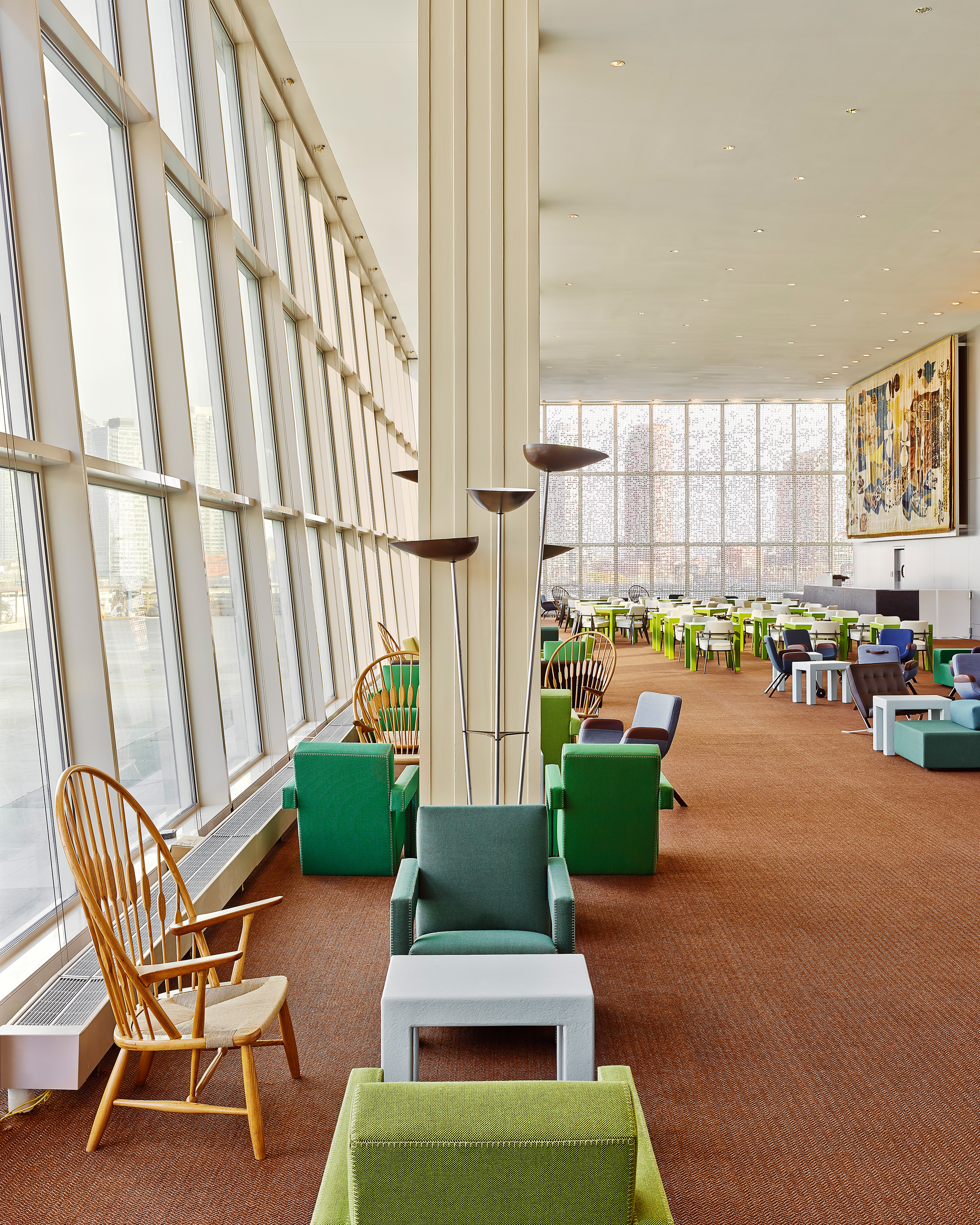
The Peacock Chair in the UN Building's Delegates' Lounge in New York

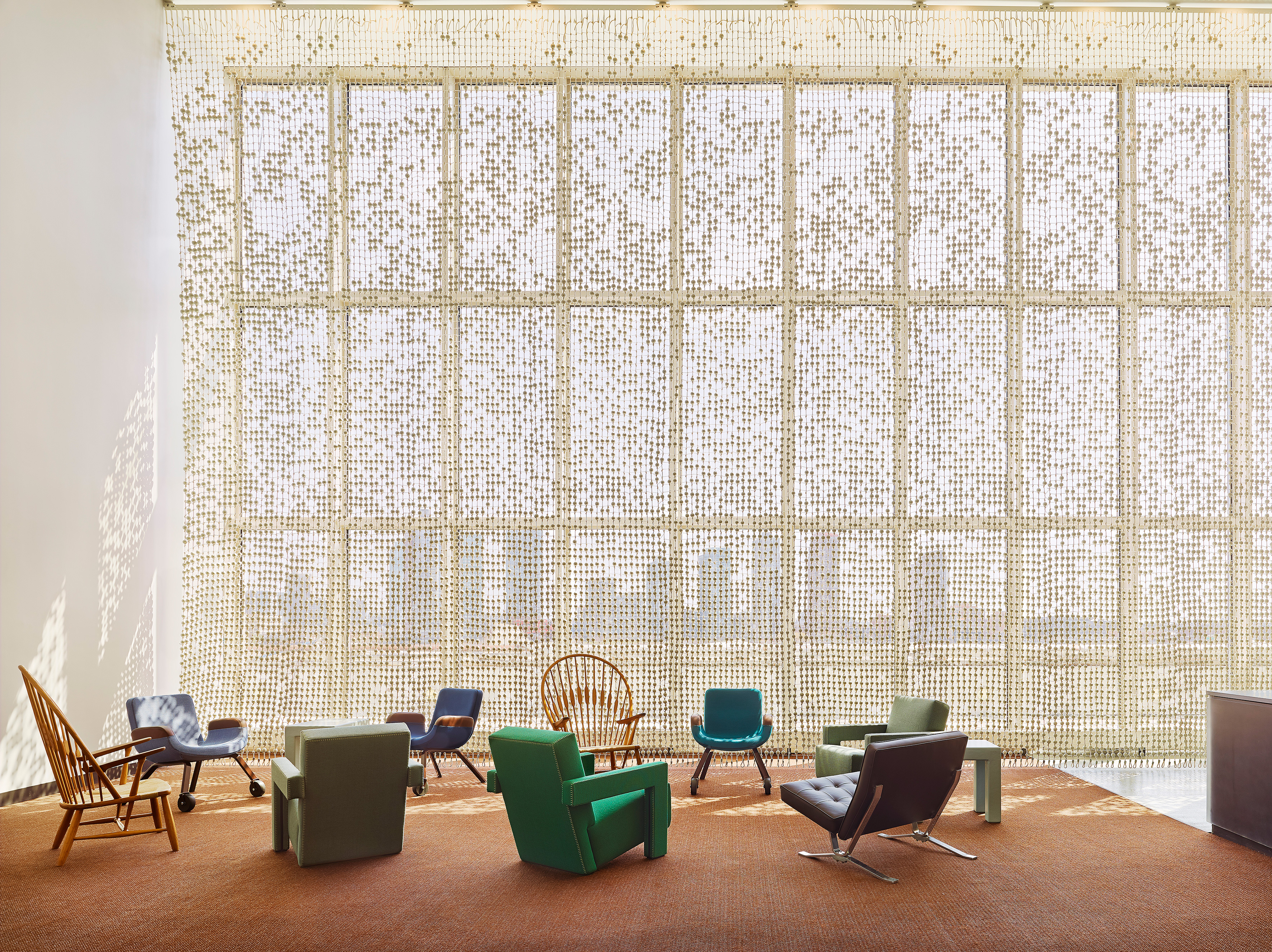
The Peacock Chair in the UN Building's Delegates' Lounge in New York

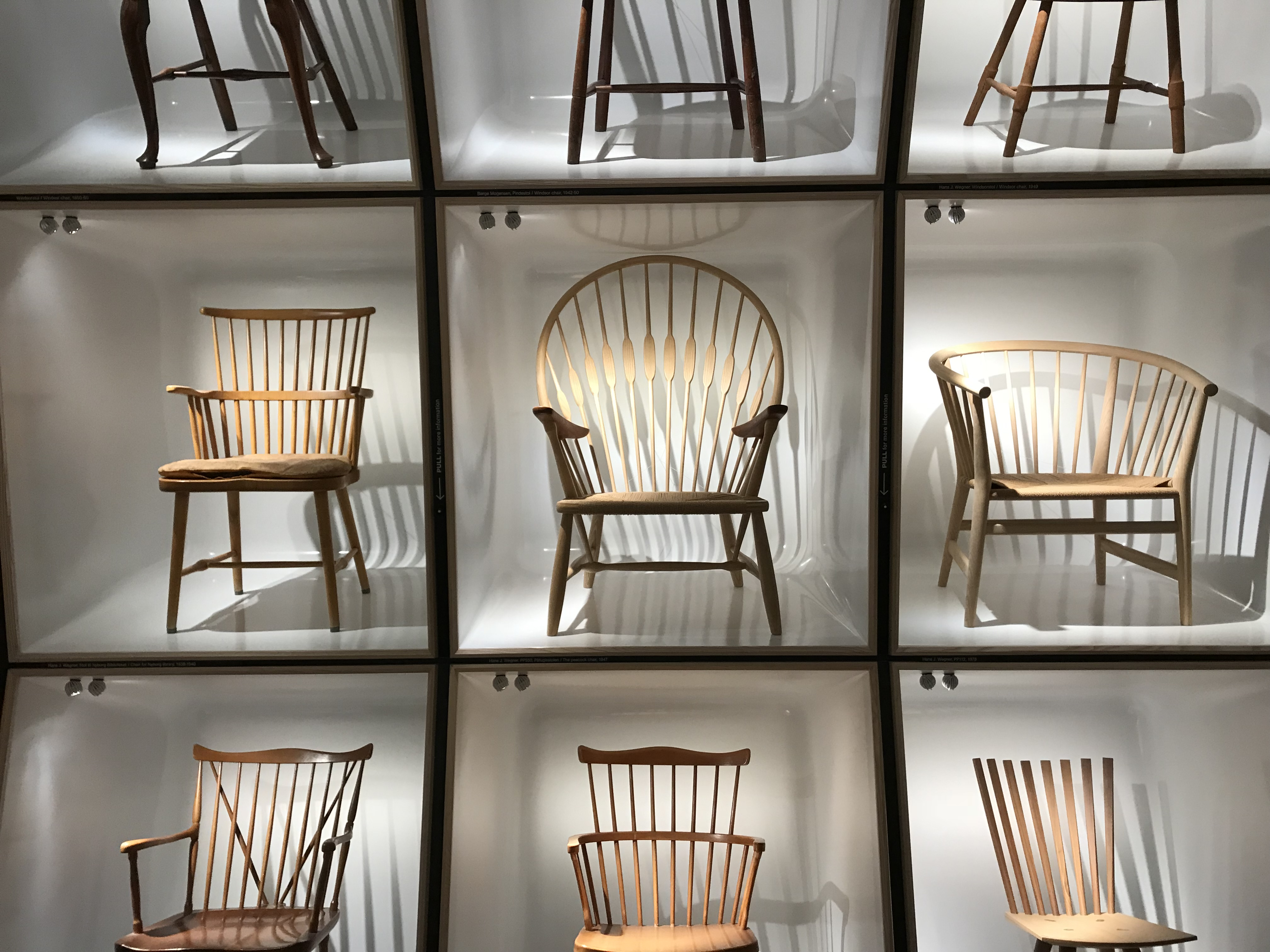
The chair on display in the Danish Design Museum
