= DR Radio =

Former division of Danish public broadcaster DR

DR Radio was a division of Danish Broadcasting Corporation - DR - concerned with radio programming. The radio stations are now part of several divisions: DR Medier (P1), DR Ung (P3), DR Musik (P2, P6 Beat, P7 Mix, P8 Jazz), DR Danmark (P4 and the regional stations).

The name DR Radio is now mainly used to refer to an app of the same name made by DR to enable online listening via smartphones.

== Current radio line-up ==
=== Analogue radio ===
- P1 - "Thought-provoking radio": Talk radio with factual programming, reports, discussion and debate on public affairs, society and the community, plus in-depth news. It is broadcast around the clock on DAB and web radio; also (daytimes only) on FM. Since 1 November 2011, P1 has timeshared its FM frequencies with P2.
- P2 - "Music and cultural radio": classical music, opera, jazz, radio drama, and coverage of other artistic performances and events. It is broadcast around the clock on DAB and web radio; also (evenings and overnight only) on FM. Since 1 November 2011, P2 has timeshared its FM frequencies with P1.
- P3 - Hit radio, with popular entertainment shows and hourly three-minute news bulletins. P3 also covers major sporting events.
- P4 - DR's most popular radio channel: a "modern public service station" broadcast in 10 regional versions, mixing popular music with national and local news. P4 also provides a Traffic Message Channel service of travel news.

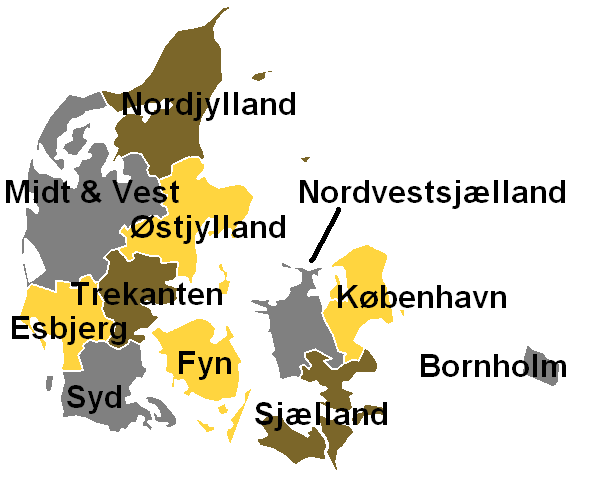
Map showing P4's 11 regions

The regional P4 channels are:

- P4 Bornholm
- P4 Esbjerg
- P4 Fyn
- P4 København
- P4 Midt & Vest
- P4 Nordjylland
- P4 Sjælland
- P4 Syd
- P4 Trekanten
- P4 Østjylland

=== Digital radio ===
- DR P1
- DR P2
- DR P3
- DR P4 - including the 10 regional stations
- DR P5 - channel aimed at older listeners
- DR P6 Beat - alternative rock music
- DR P8 Jazz - jazz music

== History ==
=== Short and medium wave radio ===
DR had a mediumwave station (called P5 Mellembølge until late 2009) carrying three daily news bulletins, a gymnastics programme, and weather and other reports for seafarers. The mediumwave transmissions ceased in 2011 and actually the programming is transmitted from Kalundborg, the site of the powerful long-range analogue longwave (formerly P6 Langbølge which officially ceased transmissions in 2007, but has since carried low-power digital DRM test transmissions and briefly resumed analogue transmissions at full power from 16 to 31 October 2009). The 243 kHz LW (LB for langbølge) is used to cover nearby seas by news and weather broadcasts. The transmissions are only 4 times daily at 05:45, 08:45, 11:45 and 17:45 local time.

In addition, DR has operated Radio Denmark on short waves, which was originally broadcast from Denmark in Danish and English, and later from transmitter sites in Norway in Danish only.

=== DAB radio ===
The first trials of DAB were carried out in 1995.

In 2002 DR began broadcasting eight new DAB channels: pop station DR Boogie Skum, parliamentary channel DR Demokrati, jazz station DR Jazz, classical music station DR Klassisk, news station DR Nyheder, cultural station DR Plus, rock station DR Rock, and soft music station DR Soft. In 2003 DR Litteratur was added to the line-up and 2004 saw the launch of DR Sport and DR Event.

In December 2004 a second transmitter network was launched, broadcasting DR Gyldne Genhør (drama, comedy and popular music from the archives), DR Kanonkamelen (programmes for young children), DR Erhverv (economic and financial news), as well as digital versions of P1, P3 and P4 Danmark. DR Barracuda (programmes for older children) was added in 2005.

In August 2005, the commercial radio stations Sky Radio (now defunct) and Radio 100FM began broadcasting on the DAB network, reducing the space available for DR and obliging it to abandon three of its DAB channels: DR Erhverv, DR Event and DR P4 Danmark (a nationwide version of the regional channel).

On New Year's Day 2006 the popular music station DR Soft was closed down, but following protests it was soon brought back. Initially, it was intended it would remain on air until the launch of a new channel called DR X, but as Sky Radio had ceased broadcasting in November 2005, DR Soft and DR X were able to continue alongside each other. DR Soft was finally closed down towards the end of 2006. A privately operated station called Radio 100FM Soft launched in its place.

December 2006 saw major changes to the line-up when the granting of exclusive use of one of the two DAB transmitter networks to the commercial stations meant that DR Gyldne Genhør, DR Kultur, DR Litteratur, DR Soft and DR Sport all had to close. They were replaced by DR P2 Plus, a resurrected DR P4 Danmark, and DR P4 Hit.

As part of a cost saving plan, DR X was closed in October 2007. It was replaced by DR Dansktop, which had previously broadcast solely on the Internet. Towards the end of 2007, DR closed down two other DAB channels: the cultural channel DR P2 Plus and the children's channel DR Barracuda. These were replaced by two pop music channels: DR Coco and DR MGP. Meanwhile, DR P2 Klassisk and DR P4 Hit changed their names by dropping the reference to their analogue parent channels and becoming DR Klassisk and DR Hit.

DR P2 joined the DAB platform in the summer of 2008. On 18 November 2008 DR launched DR P5000. This meant that DR Coco was closed down. At the same time, DR MGP became a web-only channel and was replaced by DR Pop DK.

On 2 November 2009 P4 Danmark was replaced by DR P5.

After Radio 100FM went bankrupt in early 2010, DR temporarily added two of its web radio channels to the DAB line-up on 5 February 2010. Those channels were DR Country and DR Electronica. DR Electronica was only available for a month before it was replaced by a music channel called DR Unga Bunga.

During 2011 DR relaunched and consolidated its various DAB, web and FM channels. The new channels launched at various points throughout the year, and the line-up of DR stations on DAB has stayed the same since then. Except for the two stations DR Mama and DR Ramasjang/Ultra. DR Mama closed down on 30 September 2014, while the children's channel remained until 1 January 2015.

DR P4 wasn't available on digital broadcast until 3 March 2015. It was broadcast using the DAB+ standard, unlike the other DR stations that were using the older DAB standard at the time.

=== Web radio ===
All of the above FM and DAB stations are streamed on the internet. DR previously provided a further 13 music channels available only via web radio. As of November 2007 these were:

- DR Allegro – popular classical music, film music, musicals, operetta
- DR Barometer – (formerly DR Electric) alt-rock and indie
- DR Country – country music
- DR Dansktop – popular music and schlagers (up-tempo oom-pah-pah)
- DR Electronica – electronica
- DR Evergreen
- DR Folk – folk music both Nordic and Anglo-American
- DR Hip Hop – (formerly DR Ghetto) hiphop from underground to mainstream
- DR Modern Rock
- DR R&B – R&B, soul
- DR Soft – pop
- DR Spillemand – Danish, Nordic, and Irish/Scottish/English Welsh folk music
- DR World – world music

However, these additional stations have now closed and DR Radio currently streams over the internet only those channels also available on DAB and FM.

== DAB+ ==
It was originally announced on 28 September 2013 that transmissions would convert from DAB to the newer DAB+ format on 1 December 2014.

The date for the nationwide switch-over was later moved to 1 October 2017. All of DR's stations plus the privately owned, public service channel - Radio24Syv, moved to the second national DAB multiplex (which can be regionalised).
