= Kalundborg Transmitter =

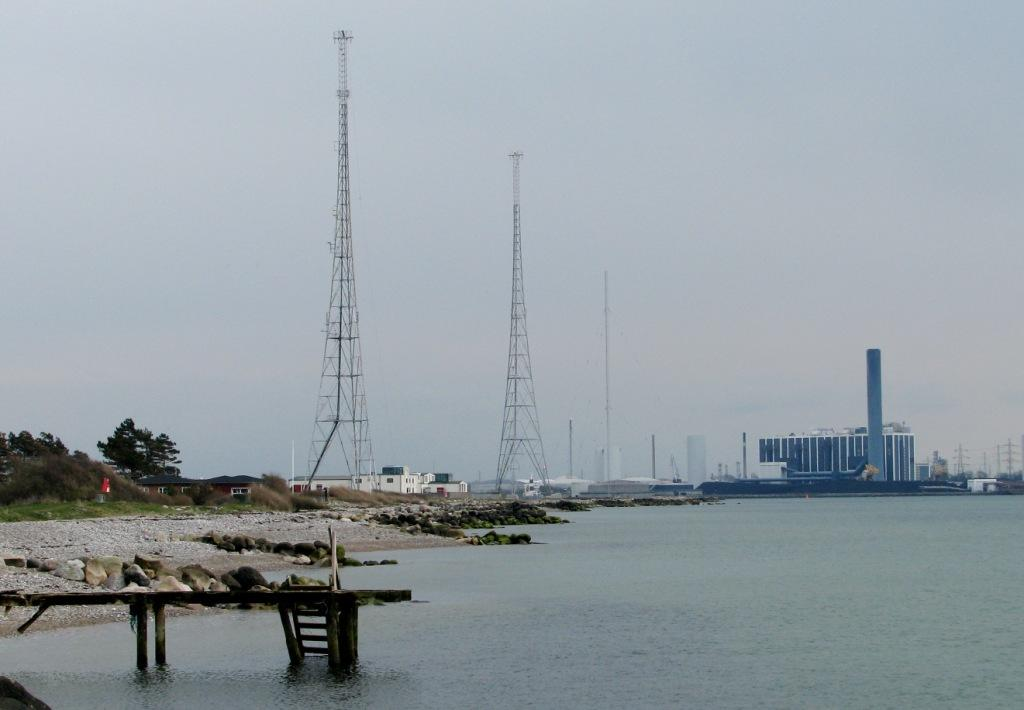

- Location within Denmark

General information
- Status: Completed
- Type: Mast
- Location: Kalundborg, Zealand
- Coordinates: 55°40′39″N 11°04′09″E
- Completed: 1927

Height
- Height: 147 m (482.28 ft)

Kalundborg Radio was a major transmission facility for long- and mediumwave at the harbour of Kalundborg in Denmark. Longwave broadcasts on 243 kHz began on 27 August 1927 and ceased on 31 December 2023. Mediumwave broadcasts on 1062 kHz began on 1 October 1951 and ceased in June 2011.

== History ==
The transmitter site was inaugurated on 27 August 1927 and started broadcasting the first channel of Danish radio on 243 kHz longwave (LW) with 300 kW. On 1 October 1951, mediumwave (MW) broadcasts of DR P2 commenced on 1062 kHz (282 m wavelength) with 250 kW. These two transmitters had a common reserve transmitter.

On 15 February 2007 at 00:05, LW transmissions from Kalundborg were suspended after 80 years of service. They resumed in Digital Radio Mondiale (DRM) mode at reduced power (200 W) on 3 October 2008 after substantial modifications to the aerial earlier that year. During 16-31 October 2009, the old MW and LW reserve transmitter served in place of the regular MW and LW DRM transmitters. Until mid-June 2011, broadcasts on 1062 kHz at 250 kW continued on a restricted time schedule. After that, the MW transmitter was taken out of service.

A new 50 kW LW transmitter replaced the MW service. During 6-12 September 2012, the transmitter also broadcast BBC programmes with 10 kW of power in DRM mode outside DR's broadcast blocks in connection with the international broadcasting exhibition IBC 2012 in Amsterdam. Shipping Forecast bulletins produced by the Danish Meteorological Institute (Danmarks Meteorologiske Institut) ceased on 1 November 2023 ahead of full closure of the longwave service on 31 December 2023.

It was possible to receive the LW signal of the Kalundborg transmitter outdoors over a distance of 800-1,000 km on a standard transistor radio or a longwave-compatible car radio. By connecting the receiver to a stationary or a maritime wire, frame, or active antenna, reception improved up to 1,500 km of range.

Every year on 4 May, Danmarks Radio rebroadcast the "message of liberation," from the Kalundborg transmitter in an hour-long memorial broadcast that began after the news at 20:00. On 4 May 1945, the Danish service of the BBC broadcast the original "message of liberation," marking the end of WWII in Denmark: "At this moment, it is announced that Montgomery has stated that the German troops in Holland, Northwest Germany, and Denmark have surrendered."

== LW and MW antennas ==
The LW antenna was an Alexanderson aerial with two grounded 118 m steel lattice radiating towers connected by top capacitance wires. The northern tower was fed from the transmitter through a top coil, with the top coil of the southern slave tower being fed via the capacitance wires. The MW aerial was an insulated guyed steel lattice mast with a height of 147 metres. All masts virtually stood in the sea on the narrow Gisseløre peninsula, providing excellent radiation efficiency.

== Normal daily programming schedule ==
Times given in Central European Time. Source:

- 06.00 - 06.05: News (Radioavisen), rebroadcast from DR P4 København
- 08.00 - 0.805: News (Radioavisen), rebroadcast from DR P4 København (Not broadcast on Sundays and public holidays)
- 08.05 - 08.30: Act of worship - Morning Devotion (Morgenandagt) from the Church of Our Lady in Copenhagen produced by DR P2 (Not broadcast on Sundays)
- 08.30 - 08.45: Morning gymnastics - Body and Movement (Krop og bevægelse) produced by DR P5
- 09.00 - 09.05: News (Radioavisen), rebroadcast from DR P4 København
- 12.00 - 12.05: News (Radioavisen), rebroadcast from DR P4 København
- 18.00 - 18.05: News (Radioavisen), rebroadcast from DR P4 København

== Photo gallery ==
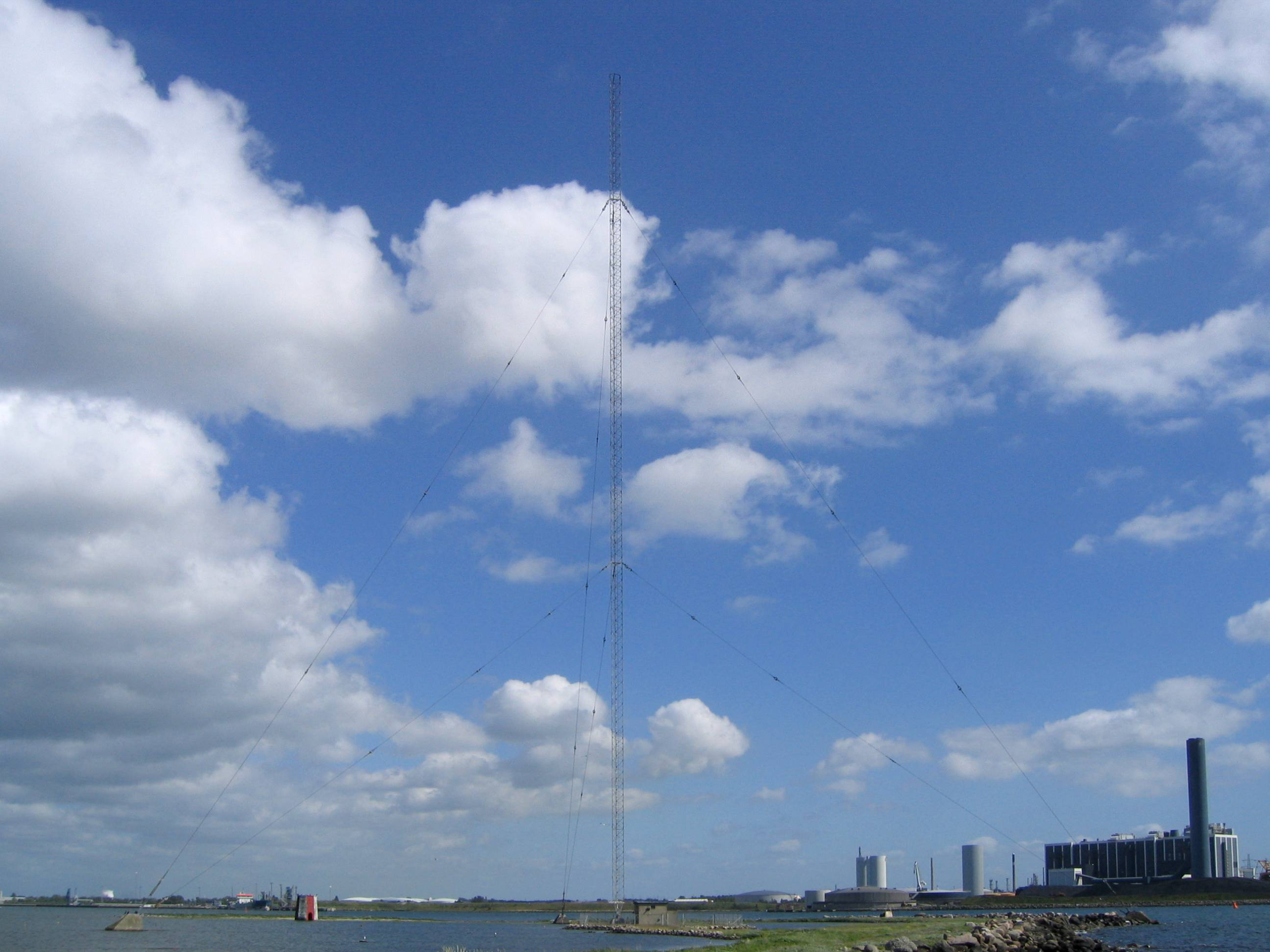
The mediumwave antenna

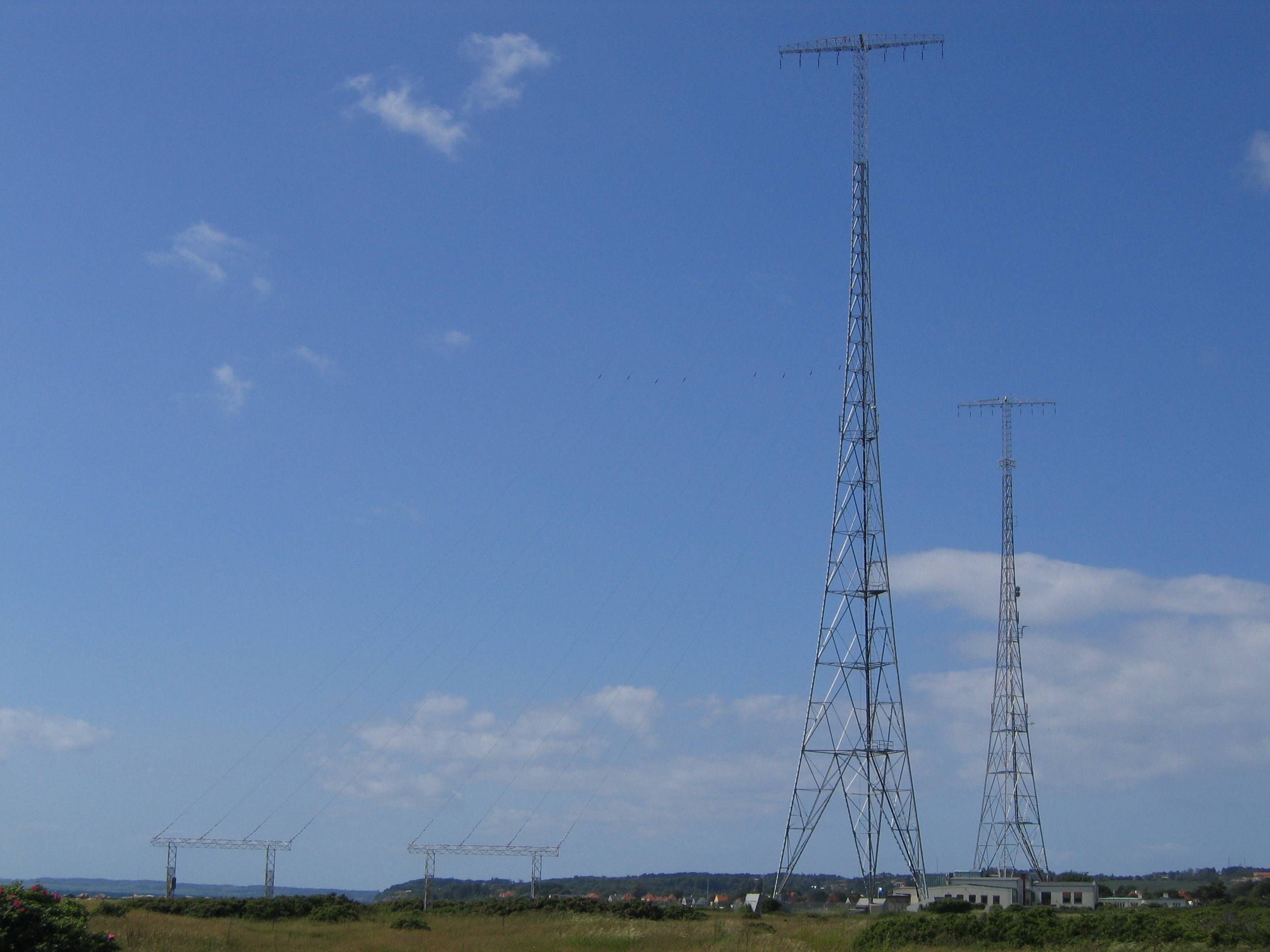
The longwave antenna

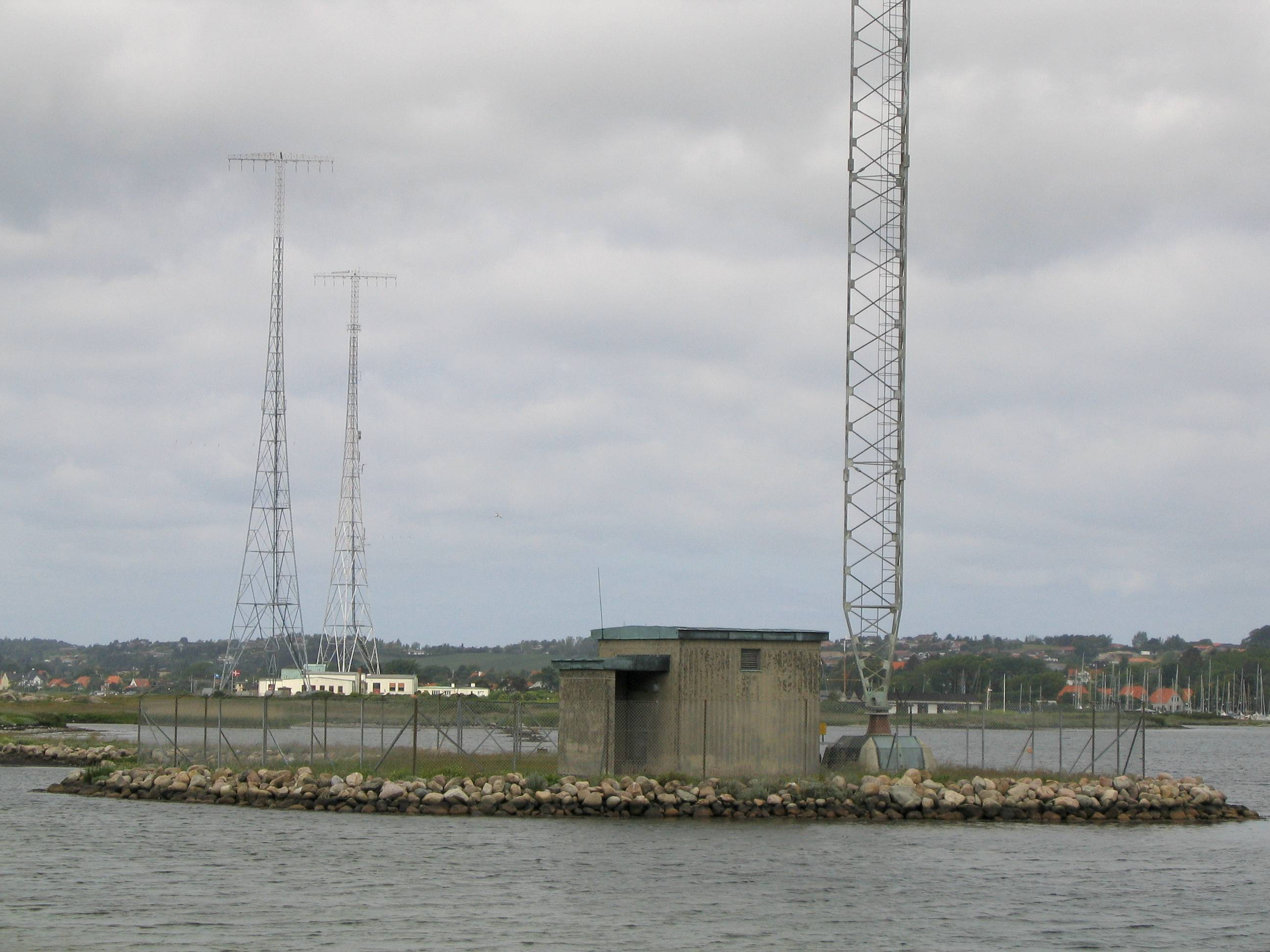
The base of the mediumwave antenna factory

== See also ==
- List of towers
- List of masts
