= The Climate Book =

2022 book by Greta Thunberg

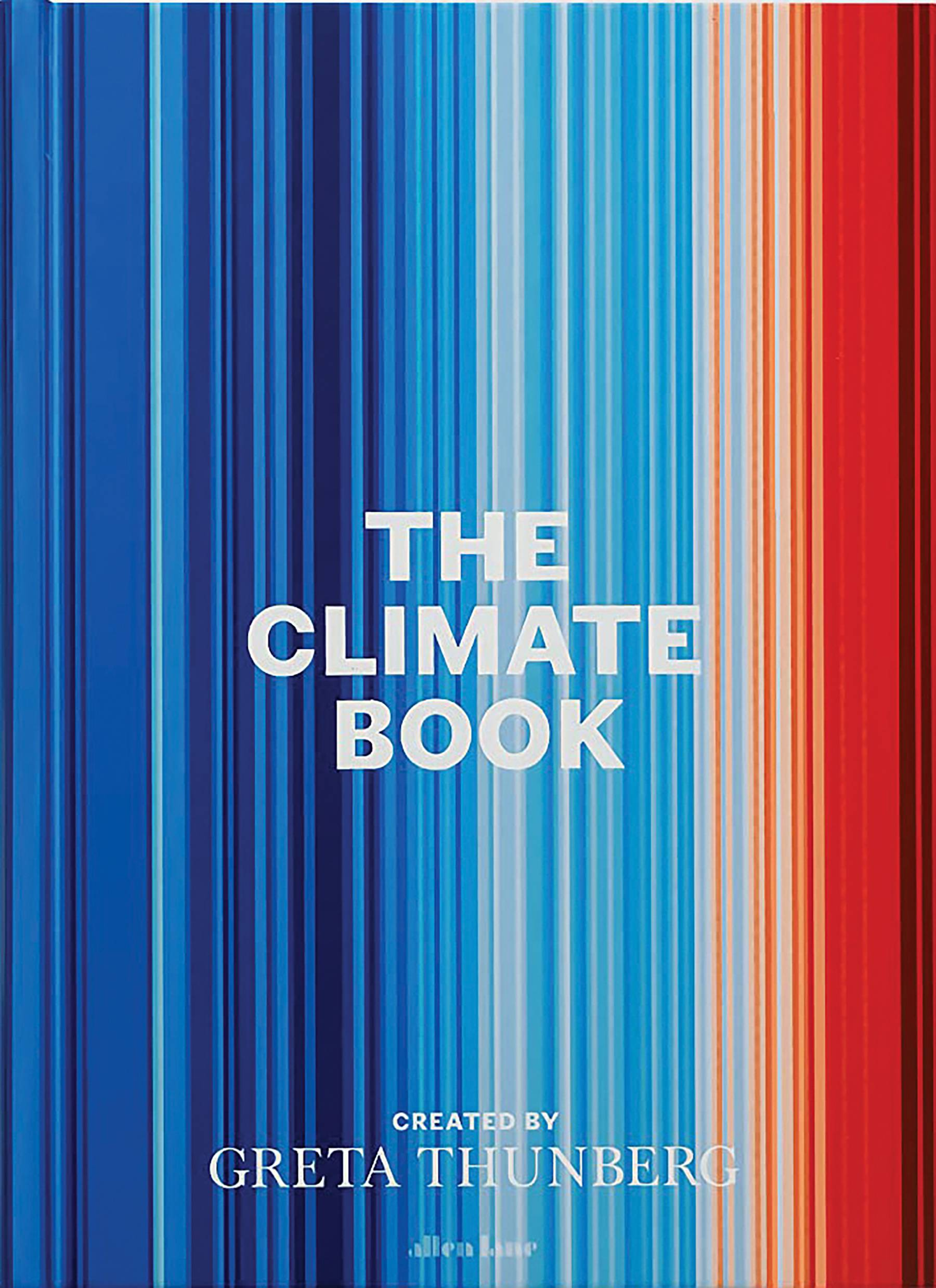
- Warming stripes, used as the cover design for The Climate Book
- Author: Greta Thunberg
- Cover artist: Ed Hawkins
- Language: English, German, Spanish, Portuguese, Italian, French, Dutch, Swedish, Danish, Norwegian, Polish
- Genre: Non-fiction
- Publisher: Penguin Random House
- Publication date: 2022-10-27, 2022-10-28
- Media type: Print, hardback
- Pages: 2+18+446+2
- ISBN: 978-0-241-54747-2
- Website: theclimatebook.org

The Climate Book is a collective non-fiction book edited by the climate activist Greta Thunberg. The original English edition was published in October 2022. Translations are published in languages including German, Spanish, Portuguese, Italian, French, Dutch, Swedish, Danish, Norwegian, and Polish.

The book consists of a collection of short essays by more than a hundred experts. It analyses the causes, consequences and challenges of the climate crisis. The cover features a warming stripes data visualization graphic of a type developed by British climatologist Ed Hawkins.

== Parts and authors ==
The Climate Book is organised in five parts:

- Part 1: How climate works
  - Contributors: Peter Brannen, Beth Shapiro, Elizabeth Kolbert, Michael Oppenheimer, Naomi Oreskes and Johan Rockström.
- Part 2: How our planet is changing
  - Contributors: Katharine Hayhoe, Zeke Hausfather, Bjørn Samset, Paulo Ceppi, Jennifer Francis, Friederike Otto, Kate Marvel, Ricarda Winkelmann, Stefan Rahmstorf, Hans-Otto Pörtner, Karin Kvale, Peter Gleick, Joëlle Gergis, Carlos Nobre, Julia Arieira, Nathália Nascimento, Beverly Law, Andy Purvis, Adriana De Palma, Dave Goulson, Keith Larson, Jennifer Soong, Örjan Gustafsson and Tamsin Edwards
- Part 3: How it affects us
  - Contributors: Tedros Adhanom Ghebreyesus, Ana Vicedo-Cabrera, Drew Shindell, Felipe Colón-Gonzalez, John Browstein, Derek MacFadden, Sarah McGough, Mauricio Santilla, Samuel Myers, Saleemul Huq, Jacqueline Patterson, Abraham Lustgarten, Michael Taylor, Hindou Oumarou Ibrahim, Elin Anna Labba, Sônia Guajajara, Solomon Hsiang, Taikan Oki, Marshall Burke and Eugene Linden
- Part 4: What we've done about it
  - Contributors: Kevin Anderson, Alexandra Urisman Otto, Bill McKibben, Glen Peters, Karl-Heinz Erb, Simone Gingrich, Niclas Hällström, Jennie Stephens, Isak Stoddard, Rob Jackson, Alexander Popp, Michael Clark, Sonja Vermeulen, John Barett, Alice Garvey, Ketan Joshi, Alice Larkin, Jilian Anable, Christian Brand, Annie Lowry, Mike Berners-Lee, Silpa Kaza, Nina Schrank, Nicholas Stern, Sunita Narain, Jason Hickel and Amitav Ghosh
- Part 5: What we must do now
  - Contributors: Stuart Capstick, Lorraine Whitmarsh, Kate Raworth, Per Espen Stoknes, Gison Eshel, Ayana Elizabeth Johnson, George Monbiot, Rebecca Wrigley, Margaret Atwood, Erica Chenoweth, Michael Mann, Seth Klein, David Wallace-Wells, Naomi Klein, Nicole Becker, Disha Ravi, Hilda Flavia Nakabuye, Laura Verónica Muñoz, Ina Maria Shikongo, Ayisha Siddiqa, Mitzi Jonelle Tan, Wanjira Mathai, Lucas Chancel, Thomas Piketty, Olúfẹ́mi Táíwò and Robin Wall Kimmerer

== Reception ==
A Publishers Weekly reviewed praised the book's passion and "lucid and accessible" explanations of global warming, and concluded that the book is "comprehensive and articulate". Gaia Vince from The Guardian commented that Thunberg wrote with directness, which she evaluated as "both refreshing to read and tiring". Vince also complimented numerous other writers, but criticised the lack of coverage on technologies that could potentially be solutions, including geo-engineering and nuclear power, concluding that the book is superb in explaining the importance of preventing climate change but has "little pragmatism over what to do about now-certain changes". A review from The Daily Telegraph awarded the book four out of five stars, praising the book's "stunningly handsome" design and calling it a "superb vademecum", but critiqued the book's thinking as "anti-capitalistic" and "anti-technology".

== See also ==
- Climate change
- Climate change mitigation
- Climate justice
- Climatism
- Greenwashing
- Tipping points in the climate system
- 2052: A Global Forecast for the Next Forty Years (A follow-up to The Limits to Growth report to the Club of Rome)
- Vom Ende der Klimakrise – Eine Geschichte unserer Zukunft (English: "About the end of the clima crises - a tale of our future")
