= Caper Clowns =

Danish indie pop band

- Origin: Ferritslev, Denmark
- Genres: Indie pop, indie rock
- Years active: 2010–present
- Labels: Gateway Music
- Members: Rick Kingo; Peter Højgaard; Christian Højgaard; Henrik Krogh; Rasmus Almlund
- Website: http://www.CaperClowns.com

Caper Clowns is a Danish indie pop band. The band was formed in 2010 and the members are Rick Kingo, Peter Højgaard, Christian Højgaard, Henrik Krogh and Rasmus Almlund.

On September 16, 2016, the band released the single "Pockets", which was chosen as the "hit tip of the week" on the Danish national radio station DR P4. Pockets was the lead single from the album The Buca Bus, which was released two weeks later. The album placed 16th on Danish radio host Madsen's top 20 list of the best albums from 2016, after being played regularly on DR P4 since the release. Internationally there has been praise for the band as well. The American radio host Alan Haber from Pure Pop Radio has called The Buca Bus debut of the year, and The Power Pop Show has listed the album as number 17 on their best album of 2016 list. The international praise towards the band led to their first ever international gigs, at The Cavern Club on May 19 and 20 for the International Pop Overthrow 2017.

During the summer of 2018 the band released the singles "The Way I Dream" and "Sacre Bleu", which immediately received airplay on both DR P5, DR P4 and several international stations.

In October 2018, the band released its second album A Salty Taste To The Lake.

In 2020 the band won the live band of the year award at Odense Live Prisen.

In 2021 the band released their third album Abdicate The Throne.

In March 2025 the band released the single Anywhere Is Home, which was instantly added to the playlist on DR P5, as well as multiple stations worldwide.

== Discography ==
=== Albums ===
- The Buca Bus (2016)
- A Salty Taste to the Lake (2018)
- Abdicate The Throne (2021)

=== EPs ===
- Type Your Text Here (2015)

=== Singles ===
- "Queens Desire" (2015)
- "Pockets" (2016)
- "All We Ever Do Is Run" (2017)
- "Dressed In Flaws" (2017)
- "The Way I Dream" (2018)
- "Sacre Bleu" (2018)
- "Paper Trail" (2018)
- "Second To None" (2019)
- "Space & Time" (2020)
- "The Club Of Humanity" (2020)
- "Bonsai Tree" (2021)
- "I'd Be Me" (2021)
- "CAPS LOCK ON" (2021)
- "Anywhere Is Home" (2025)

== Members ==
=== Current members ===
- Rick Kingo – vocals, guitar, keyboards
- Peter Højgaard – vocals, keyboards, drums
- Christian Højgaard – vocals, bass guitar
- Henrik Krogh – vocals, guitar, keyboards
- Rasmus Almlund – vocals, drums, guitar

=== Past members ===
- Alexander "Skipper" Storm – drums, backing vocalist
- Sebastian Storm – guitar, backing vocalist
- Søren Daugaard Jensen – drums, backing vocalist
