= Kristian Leth =

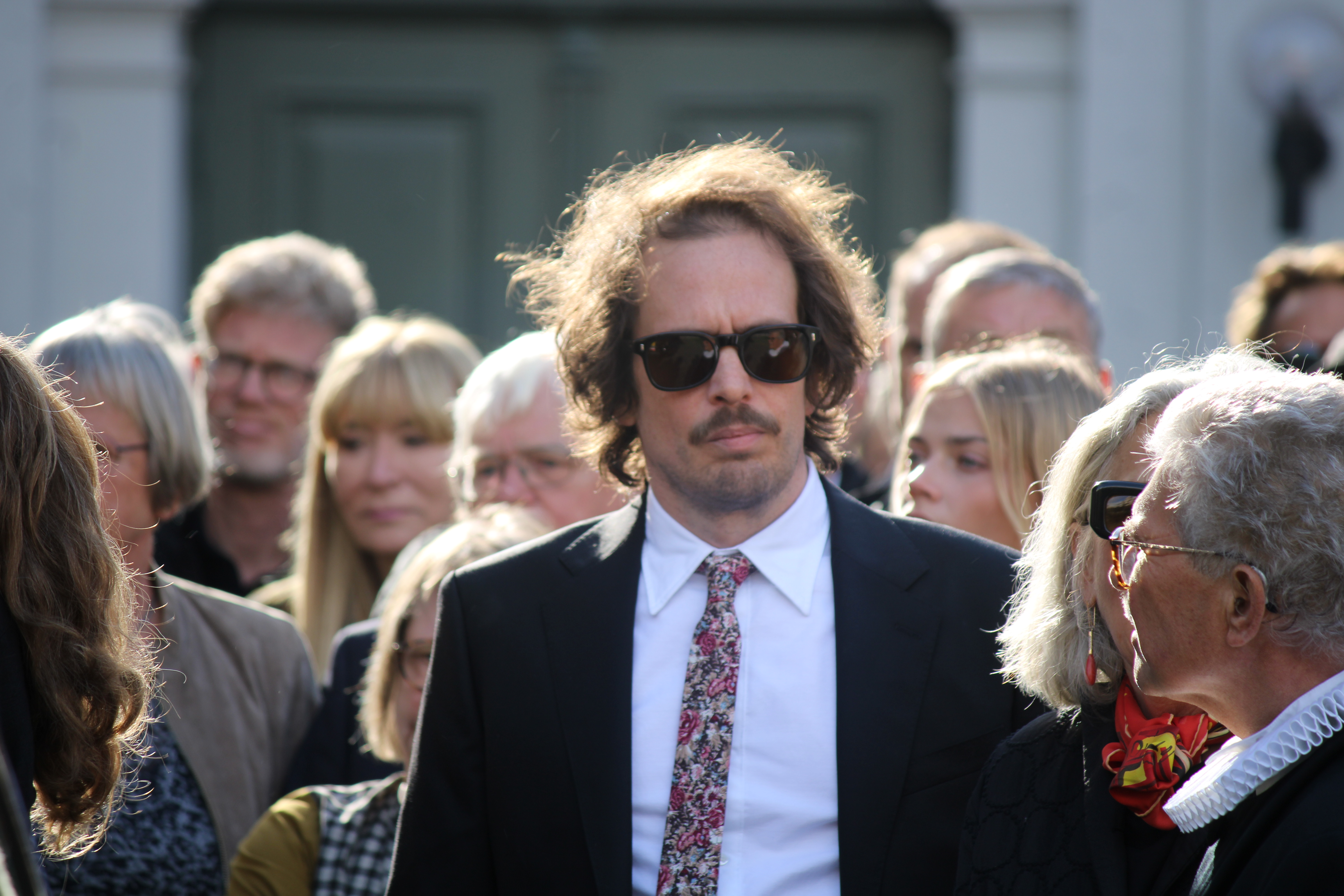
Leth in 2025

Kristian Leth (born March 27, 1980) is a Danish author, musician, and radio journalist. He is best known as the lead singer of the indie rock band The William Blakes. He is a broadcaster for the Danish Broadcasting Corporation (DR).

== Early life and family ==
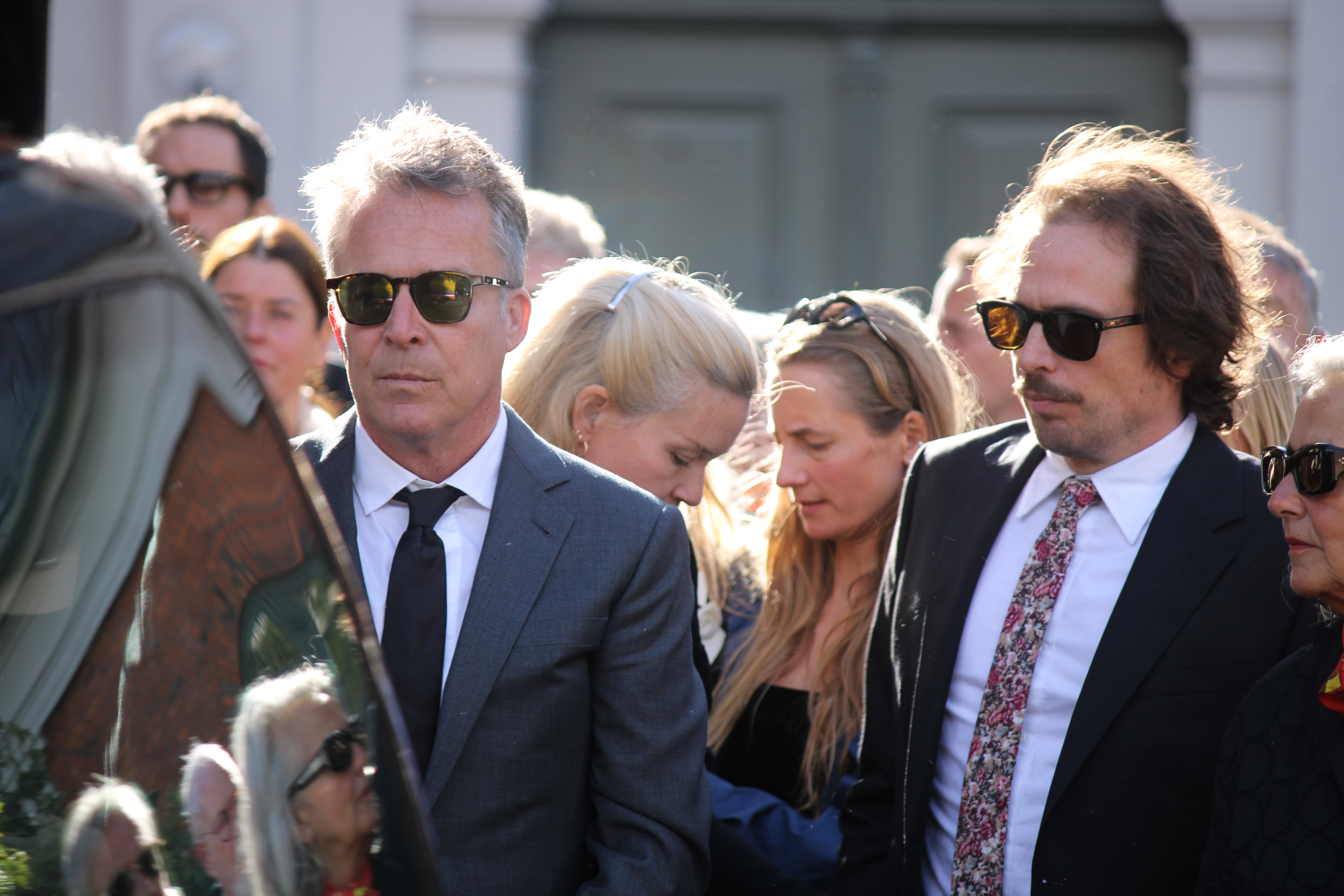
Leth with his brother Asger Leth at their father's funeral, October 2025

Leth was born in Albertslund and raised in a highly creative environment. He is the son of the late avant-garde filmmaker and poet Jørgen Leth and the actress Hanne Uldal. He graduated from Forfatterskolen (The Danish Academy of Creative Writing) in 2002. He is married to the Danish film director Tea Lindeburg. He has lived in Brooklyn, New York, since 2014, which has influenced his later work. He has three children.

== Literary work ==
Leth has written non-fiction, novels and poetry. He debuted with the poetry collection Land in 2002. His non-fiction book Historien om det hele (2016), co-written with scientist Eske Willerslev, explores the origins of humanity.

He authored a critically acclaimed trilogy of memoirs consisting of En vej ud af tågen (2022), En tid med mirakler (2022), and Afstanden (2024).

In 2024, he published Verdens vigtigste bog ("The World's Most Important Book") about the Bible's influence on Western culture and was appointed as a language consultant for the upcoming authorized Danish Bible translation (scheduled for 2036).

== Career ==
=== Music ===
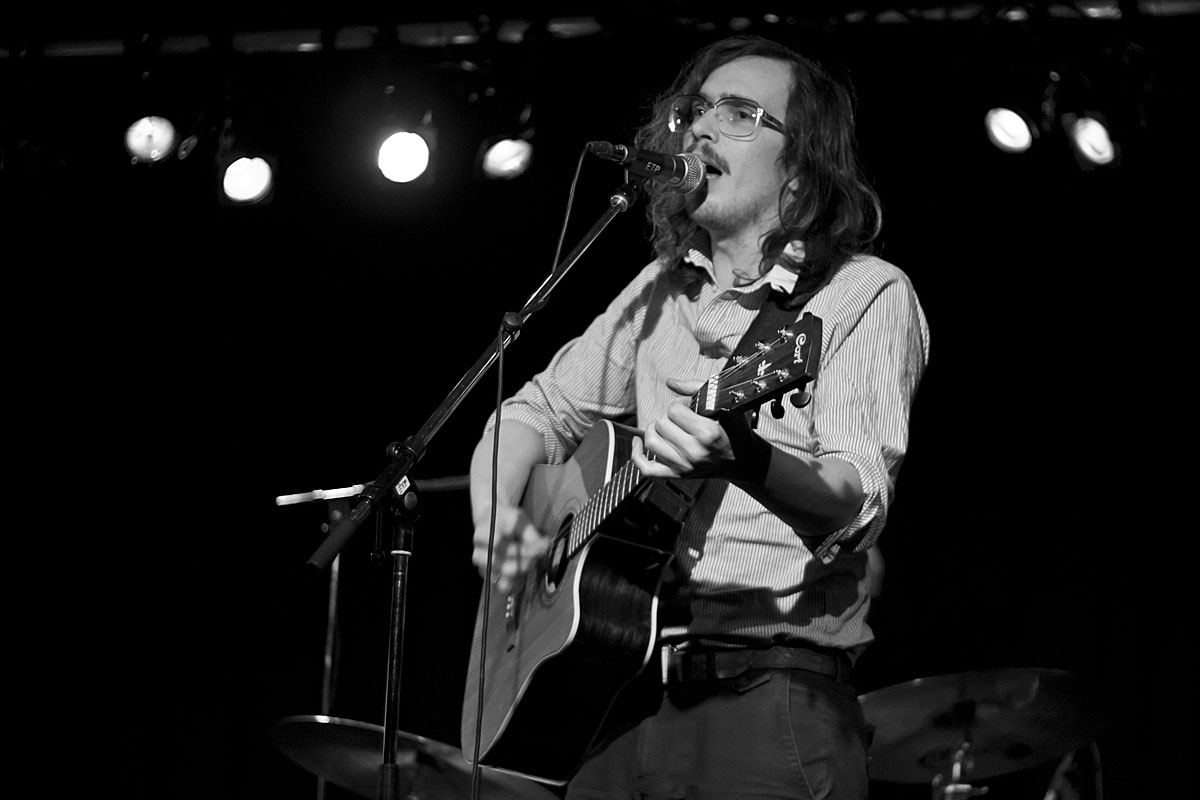
Leth performing at a concert in Vanløse, November 2012

Leth is most recognized musically as the frontman for the William Blakes, which he formed in 2007. The band has been central to the Danish indie scene, winning two Danish Music Awards and the Crown Prince Couple's Culture Prize in 2011.

Solo Work: He has released several solo albums in Danish, including Hjemad (2012), Fremmed Land (2016), and Stormen (2021).

=== Film scoring ===
Leth frequently composes scores for film and TV, including the Netflix series Rita and Equinox.

=== Journalism and radio ===
Leth has hosted several popular programs on DR P6 Beat and DR P1. He won the Prix Italia 2014 for his radio series Wagner's Ring According to Kristian Leth.

- Album: A cult-favorite radio show and podcast co-hosted with Ralf Christensen, where they analyze classic albums track-by-track.
- Bibelen Leth fortalt: A popular podcast series where he breaks down biblical narratives for a modern audience.
