= The Buca Bus =

Studio album by Caper Clowns
- Released: September 30, 2016
- Genre: indie pop; indie rock
- Label: Gateway Music
- Producer: Henrik Krogh

Caper Clowns chronology
Type Your Text Here (2015)	The Buca Bus (2016)	A Salty Taste to the Lake (2018)

The Buca Bus is the debut studio album by Danish indie pop band Caper Clowns, released September 30, 2016. The album was well-received and was voted the 16th best album from 2016 on Danish radio show Madsen on DR P4. The lead single Pockets was picked as the weekly hit tip on P4 Play immediately upon release. Internationally the album did well too, and was named debut of the year by American radio host Alan Haber from Pure Pop Radio. It also finished 17th on The Power Pop Show’s list of the best releases from 2016.

== Track listing ==
1. "Pockets" – 3:20
2. "A Tale Of Romance & Magnetic Trains" – 3:12
3. "All We Ever Do Is Run" – 2:40
4. "The Significance Of Tea Cups" – 3:02
5. "Sleeping On The Edge Of The Rainbow" – 2:42
6. "As The Moment Takes You Away" – 3:28
7. "Things I Fail To Find" – 5:24
8. "A Forest Of Letters" – 3:42
9. "Mirror Me" – 2:37
10. "Dressed In Flaws" – 3:17
11. "When I'm Alive" – 2:54
12. "Lizard Heart" – 3:18
