= Climatism =

Climate change mitigation ideology

Climatism is a social, political, and economic ideology and movement that emerged toward the end of the 20th century and aims to combat global warming, for example through climate change mitigation, so that its impact on people's living conditions is mitigated and ultimately neutralized. More specifically, the idea of net-zero emissions emerged in the 2010s, the notion that an account of emission and capture of greenhouse gases by a certain deadline should show net emissions of zero.

The term originated in the 2000s, initially used pejoratively by climate skeptics and others who did not believe in human-caused global warming and its harmful effects, about those who did. These critics have regularly referred to climatism as a movement with religious traits, with dogmas, prophet, apocalypse, morality, guilt, and hope. (Note: In his analysis of Christianity’s influence on modern life, Verdens vigtigste bog, Kristian Leth suggests that “nature has today taken the place of religion as the subject of discussion, when we discuss human responsibility, destiny and sin. It is in the climate discussion and the narrative of biodiversity that substantial arguments are put forward. About man’s place in cosmos, if we have gone too far in our search for the good life. And even, if we are now being punished for these sins.”) Or they have characterized the movement as undemocratic and compared its desire for a world government, which could handle global warming, with the former regimes in communist Eastern Europe.

== Definitions ==
According to Steve Goreham, climatism "is an ideology promoting the belief that man-made greenhouse gas emissions are destroying the Earth's climate". He denies any human influence on climate and does not believe in climate change mitigation.

According to Mike Hulme, climatism is the belief that many of the big problems, like wars, wildfires and migrant flows, facing the peoples and governments around the world in the decades around year 2000 are caused by man-made climate change, and should be solved by mitigating this climate change, more specifically by achieving net zero carbon emissions. This ideology has grown out of a climate reductionist way of thinking, where "climate alone will determine the human future". As opposed to Goreham, Hulme recognizes human influence on climate change, but believes it should be mitigated in more ways than just achieving net zero emissions.

== History ==
After the discovery around 1960 that the carbon dioxide concentration of the atmosphere steadily increases, and the effect this has on global warming, American economist William Nordhaus was in the 1970's the first to analyse the cost of limiting global warming. His analysis linked the economic parameter of GDP to the meteorological parameter of global temperature, thereby introducing global temperature as an overall measure of global climate condition, and thus made global temperature available as a control variable for policy makers, like GDP. And like during the 20. century, when GDP came to define the health of an economy, then likewise in the first decades of the 21. century, global temperature has come to define the health of world climate, in what has been described as a sort of fetischism, lending more significance to GPD and global temperature, respectively, than what is reasonable.

It has been suggested that, partly as a consequence of the above-mentioned, the rise of climatism as an ideology has consisted of the following steps:

1. The history of climate was reduced only to its physical history.
2. Predictive models of Earth system science began to overwhelm other approaches to the study of climatology.
3. Global temperature was adopted as the dominant index for capturing the condition of all climate-society relationships.
4. The 'social cost of carbon' was created to integrate climate change into economics.
5. How the future is imagined was reduced to the future condition of climate.
6. Human adaptation to weather extremes and climatic variability was made contingent upon precise predictions of the future state of climate.
7. An 'allowable carbon budget' was adopted as a proxy for securing global temperature.
8. Specific weather events started to be explained in terms of their 'naturalness' or 'humanness'.
9. The impacts of specific extreme weather events are attributed (proportionately) to climate change.
10. The window for political action on climate change became framed according to ever-shortening timelines.

Preventing the climate from getting worse will prevent everything else from getting worse.

— climatist aphorism

Climatism has thus evolved from the study of climate and climate change, by "predicting the future of the world on the basis of future climate", thereby reducing the prediction of future conditions, including environmental and cultural phenomena, and the solution of public and political matters of concern into dealing with and mitigating the human causes of climate change. This line of thinking has tended to structure the way in which the present and future of planet Earth is being understood, leading to the ideology of climatism, see quote.

== Debate ==
The rhetoric of time scarcity should not be used to short-circuit democratic processes.

— professor Mike Hulme

Complaints against climatism focus on what has been called a 'narrowing of vision', by reducing the understanding of the future to a scientific approach, namely the "fate of global climate and the achievement of Net-Zero", disregarding or marginalizing "the broader context of human development, political freedom, technological innovation, human adaptation and ecological evolution". Further, climatism has been criticized for only offering an understanding of relationships between climate, society and policy as seen from a scientific angle, assuming that scientific knowledge is sufficient for designing solutions, thus ignoring political debate.

== See also ==
- Climate action
- Climate change denial
- Climate change mitigation
- Climate justice
- Greenwashing
- Scientific consensus on climate change
- Tipping points in the climate system

=== Movements ===
- Climate movement
  - 350.org
  - Extinction Rebellion
  - Fridays for Future
  - Sunrise Movement

=== Influencers ===
- veteran environment campaigner Mayer Hillman
- climate scientist Michael E. Mann
- TikTok host Charles McBryde

== Miscellaneous ==
Climatism is the company name of a Greek company providing air condition solutions.

== Literature ==
- Steve Goreham (2010): Climatism!: Science, Common Sense, and the 21st Century's Hottest Topic. New Lenox Books, 466 pages, ISBN 978-0982499634
- Mike Hulme (2023): Climate Change isn't Everything: Liberating Climate Politics from Alarmism. Polity, 208 pages, ISBN 978-1509556168

== External references ==
- Climate Clock
