= Vibeke Sperling =

Danish journalist

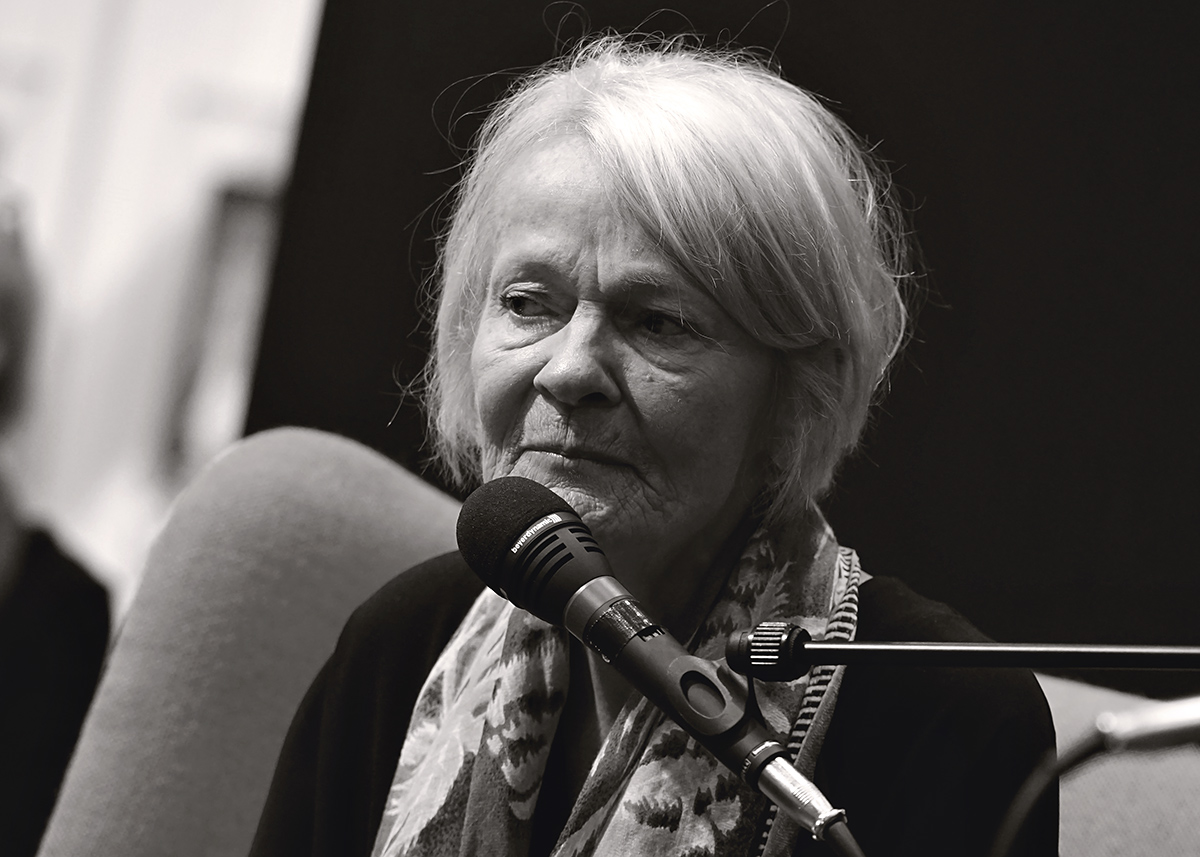
- Sperling in 2015
- Born: Vibeke von Sperling; 26 January 1945; Aalborg, Denmark
- Died: 13 May 2017 (aged 72); Copenhagen, Denmark
- Occupation: Journalist
- Years active: 1964–2015
- Children: 3

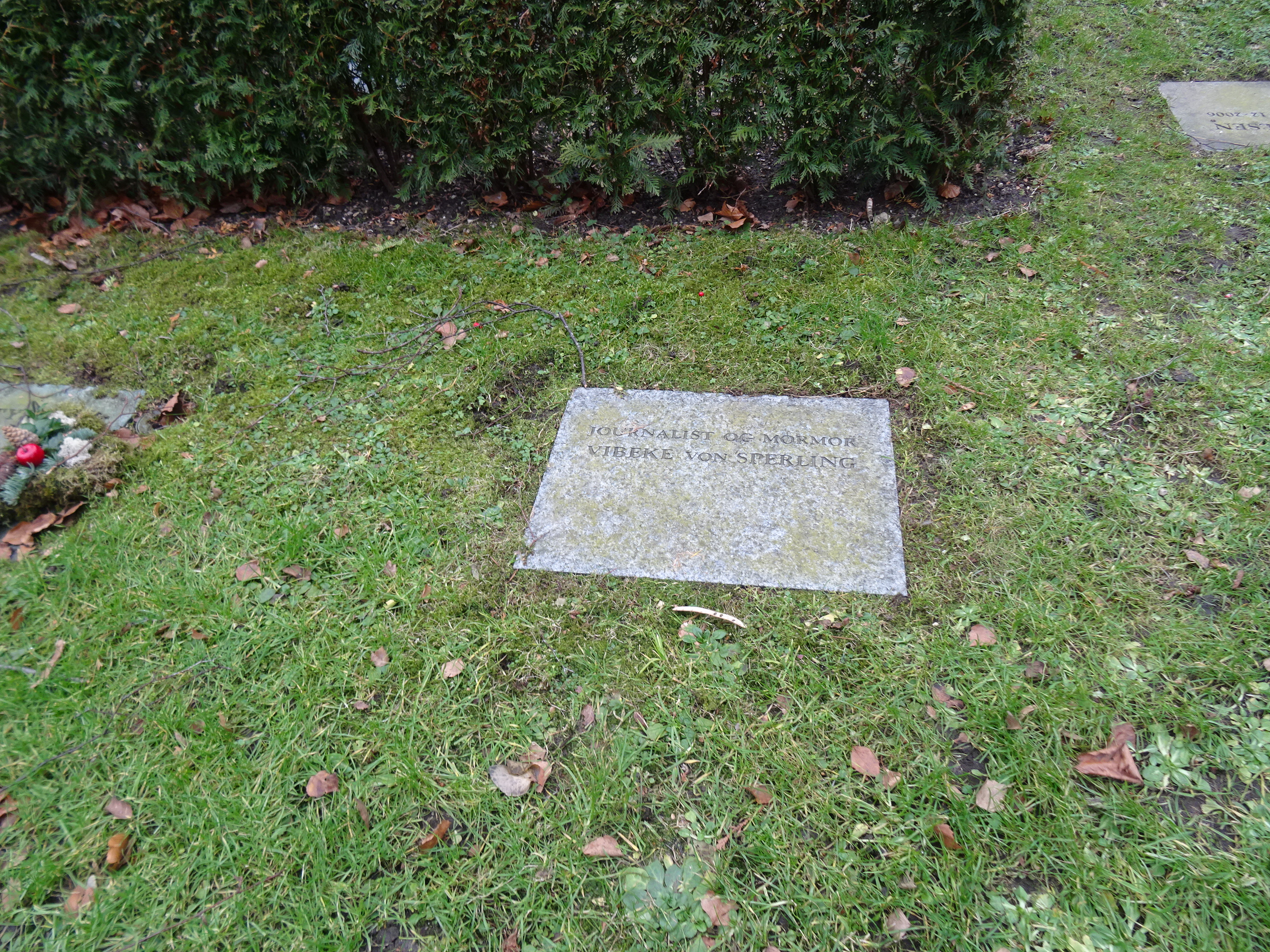
The grave of Vibeke von Sperling in Copenhagen.

Vibeke von Sperling (26 January 1945 – 13 May 2017) was a Danish newspaper and broadcast journalist. She began working as a teaching assistant teaching about the Central and Eastern Europe as well as the Soviet Union at Aarhus University and Roskilde University before joining the staff at Dagbladet Information newspaper in 1978, where she would become its editor-in-chief in 1983. Sperling began working for DR Radio in 1987 until she joined the newspaper Politiken and became the first female foreign affairs editor at a Danish national newspaper while there in 2000 before becoming a foreign employee and commentator at the publication in 2003. She was the author of ten books on Eastern European politics, Russia and Yugoslavia.

== Biography ==
On 26 January 1945, Sperling was born Vibeke von Sperling in Aalborg. She was the daughter of the German brewmaster Kurt Ditlev von S., who had a conservative background, and the telegraph operator and waitress Grethe Lund Pedersen, who originated from a social democratic environment. Sperling's parents divorced when she was five years old, and she and her siblings lived with her mother in Skive. She was raised with the perception that "the notion that it was women who could and that men were weak." Sperling left Italy and studied classical literature at Viborg Katedralskole for a year in 1963 then relocated to Rome, where she worked as an au pair and learnt to speak Italian. She studied classical archaeology at Aarhus University starting from 1964 and became interested in other cultures travelling to Eastern and Central Europe, becoming a tour guide for Danish tourist groups visiting Yugoslavia in the late 1960s and the early 1970s. Sperling did not complete her education at university and was international secretary of the Student Council during 1968.

She joined the Left Socialists political party in 1967 and was elected to its primary board at its first congress and was a frequent representative of the party in European meetings. Sperling opposed the assession of Denmark to the European Community in 1973 due to her belief it was causing division in Europe. From 1974 to 1978, Sperling worked as a teaching assistant teaching about the Central and Eastern Europe as well as the Soviet Union at Aarhus University and Roskilde University. The Dagbladet Information newspaper employed Sperling to join its staff in 1978, working as a correspondent in Moscow from 1981 to 1982 in which she criticised and analysed Soviet society in-depth. She became the newspaper's editor-in-chief with Torben Krogh in 1983 and left the publication in 1987. From 1987 to 1993, Sperling worked on the programme P1 Orientering on Danmarks Radio (DR) in the Soviet Union and later in Eastern Europe and Russia. She went on to become DR Radio's Moscow correspondent for the programmes Radioavisen and Orientering between 1993 and 1997. Sperling was subsequently made editor of DR2's foreign policy magazine programme Udefra in 1997 and 1998.

She was appointed foreign editor at the newspaper Politiken in 1998, becoming the first female to hold that job at a major large nationwide newspaper in Denmark. Sperling left the job in 2000. She was made a foreign employee and commentator at Politiken in 2003 and became a board member of The Danish Foreign Policy Society in 2010. Sperling was the author of a total of ten books that had subjects such as Russia and followed the development of that nation, as well as Yugoslavia and politics in Eastern Europe. She wrote Sovjetimperiet i opløsning in 1991, Jugoslavien i stykker the following year, and Russernes drømm in mid-2015 in which she discusses the lack of understanding of Russia and the Russian people by the Western world.

== Personal life ==
Sperling was twice married and had three children. On 13 May 2017, she died of cancer in Copenhagen.

== Analysis and awards ==
According to Inge-Lise Paulsen & Vibeke Nissen in Sperling's entry in Dansk kvindebiografisk leksikon, she was incredibly conscious to understand day-to-day life in interviews and reports she authored and she had "the combination of professional integrity and political commitment, which has meant that throughout her journalistic career she has had a unique impact on the Danish public." She was named the recipient of the Publicist Award in 1990 and the Den Berlingske Fonds Journalistpris accolade in 1992.
