= Tyndall Centre =

UK-based organisation for climate change research

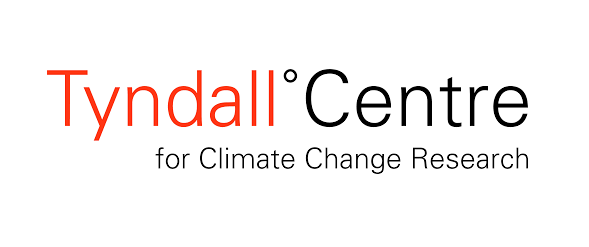
Logo of the Tyndall Centre for Climate Change Research (from tyndall.ac.uk)

The Tyndall Centre for Climate Change Research is a partnership of universities, based in the United Kingdom, which brings together scientists, economists, engineers and social scientists to "to understand the impacts of climate change and inform the transition to a sustainable, low-carbon and resilient future.".

The centre, named after the 19th-century Irish physicist John Tyndall and founded in 2000, has core partners of the University of East Anglia, University of Bath, University of Manchester, Newcastle University and the University of Southampton. Fudan University joined the Tyndall Centre partnership in 2011.

The Tyndall Centre is headquartered, with the Climatic Research Unit, in the Hubert Lamb building at the University of East Anglia. Its Director is Professor Andrew Jordan, based at the University of East Anglia, and appointed in 2025. Former directors of the Tyndall Centre include Robert Nicholls, Professor Corinne Le Quéré FRS CBE, Professor Sir Robert Watson, Professor Kevin Anderson, Professor Andrew Watkinson and Professor John Schellnhuber. The founding director is Professor Mike Hulme. Asher Minns is Executive Director.

The year 2025 marked 25 years of the Tyndall Centre for Climate Change Research. To celebrate this occasion, and look ahead to the urgent climate action needed, the Tyndall Centre held a conference called the Critical Decade for Climate Action Conference.

== Research Focus ==
The Tyndall Centre has four main research themes: Accelerating Social Change, Achieving Health and Wellbeing Through Climate Action, Catalysing Adaptation and Resilience, and Reaching Zero Emissions.

In the Accelerating Social Change Theme, the Tyndall Centre focuses on the importance of people, organisations, lifestyles and consumption in addressing the climate crisis. The interdisciplinary research advocates for transformative social change to address the climate crisis, with a view to reducing emissions in high-emitting countries and groups, and adapting to climate change for vulnerable places and people.

The Achieving Health and Wellbeing Through Climate Action theme recognises that climate change is already generating severe impacts across all constituents of human wellbeing, including in communities that have contributed least to the crisis. The theme seeks to understand the ways in which the complex impacts of heat, flood, drought, storminess and others are experienced, and how adaptations and climate action can contribute to improving human health and wellbeing, particularly when strategies, concepts and approaches are informed by lived realities.

In Catalysing Adaptation and Resilience, the Tyndall Centre seeks to better understand current and future risk, including changes to hazard, vulnerability, and exposure and hence resilience to climate change at global, national and local scales and across sectors and regions from North to South.

In the Reaching Zero Emissions theme, the Tyndall Centre examines how the Paris Agreement commitments, without overshoot, require a rapid and deep reduction in global emissions by 2030. This presents an unprecedented challenge across all sectors and their supply chains. While much of the world’s focus is on emissions reduction, achieving net zero emissions will also require the active removal of greenhouse gases from the atmosphere through a wide range of approaches.

== See also ==
- Climate change in the United Kingdom
- Andrew J. Jordan
- Kevin Anderson (scientist)
- Climatic Research Unit
- Adaptation to global warming
- Mitigation of global warming
