= Andrew J. Jordan =

British environmental policy scholar

Professor Andrew J. Jordan FBA, FAcSS, FIEMA
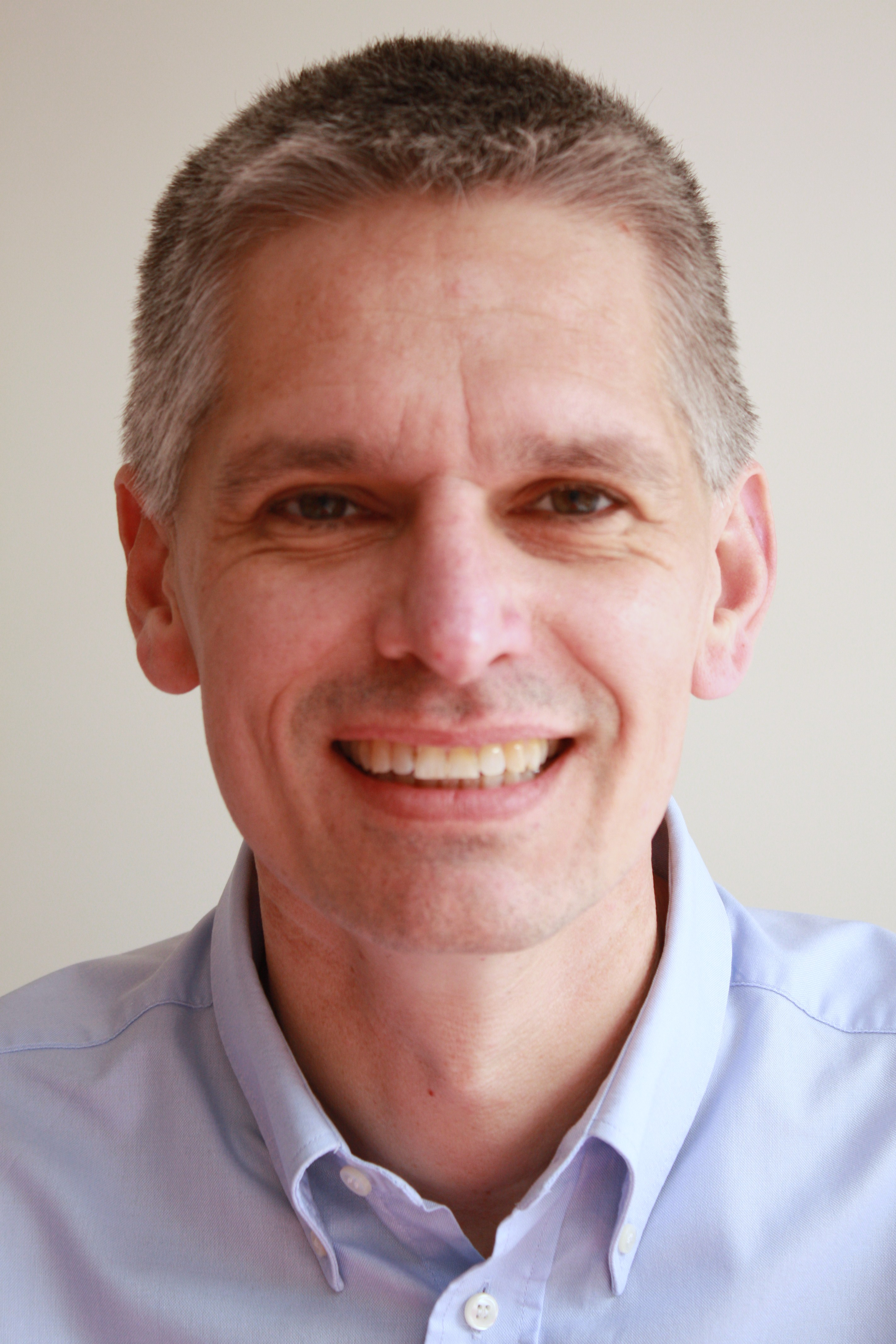
- Born: Andrew James Jordan; 1968 (age 57–58); Sheffield, England
- Known for: Environmental governance Europeanization of policy Climate policy
- Awards: Philip Leverhulme Prize (2003); Fellow of the Academy of Social Sciences (2008); Leverhulme Trust Major Research Fellowship (2010); FBA (2022)

Academic background
- Education: University of Hull (BSc); University of Manchester (MSc); University of East Anglia (PhD)

Andrew James Jordan FBA, FAcSS, FIEMA is a British environmental policy scholar and professor at the University of East Anglia (UEA), where he is director of the Tyndall Centre for Climate Change Research. He is known for his work on environmental governance in the United Kingdom and the European Union. He has been honoured for his policy impact generating activities, including, advisory roles in several national and international institutions.

== Early life and education ==
Jordan was born in Sheffield in 1968 and lived in Birley Carr. Later he attended Tapton Comprehensive School, Crosspool, Sheffield. He obtained his BSc in geography, with first-class honours, from the University of Hull in 1989. He completed an MSc in Environmental Pollution Control at the University of Manchester in 1990, followed by a PhD at the University of East Anglia in 1997.

== Academic career ==
Andy Jordan began his academic career at the University of East Anglia in 1992, joining the Centre for Social and Economic Research on the Global Environment (CSERGE) as a research associate. He was later promoted to senior research associate in 1996, and continued his academic progression as a lecturer in environmental politics between 1999 and 2001. From 2004 to 2007, he held the position of reader in environmental politics, before being appointed professor of environmental policy in 2007.

In addition to his academic posts, Jordan served as manager of the Economic and Social Research Council (ESRC) Programme on Environmental Decision Making from 2001 to 2004.

In December 2024, he was appointed interim director of the Tyndall Centre for Climate Change Research and formally took up the position of director in May 2025.

== Honors ==
- Philip Leverhulme Prize Fellowship (2003–2006), for outstanding contributions to environmental governance research
- Fellow of the Academy of Social Sciences (FAcSS) in 2008
- UACES Book Prize (2007), for a major contribution to European studies
- Leverhulme Trust Major Research Fellowship (2010–2013), supporting distinguished researchers on original projects
- Harold D. Lasswell Prize (2011), for the best article in the journal Policy Sciences
- Fellow of the Institute of Environmental Management and Assessment (FIEMA) in 2018
- Fellow of the British Academy (FBA) in 2022

== Selected publications ==
=== Monographs ===
- Jordan, A.J. (1993). Blueprint Three: Measuring Sustainable Development. Earthscan.
- Jordan, Andrew J. (2002). The Europeanization of British Environmental Policy: A Departmental Perspective. Palgrave Macmillan. ISBN 978-0-333-94631-2.
- Jordan, Andrew; Schout, Adriaan (2006). The Coordination of the European Union: Exploring the Capacities for Networked Governance. Oxford University Press. ISBN 978-0-19-954848-4.
- Wurzel, Rüdiger; Zito, Anthony; Jordan, Andrew (2013). Environmental Governance in Europe: A Comparative Analysis of New Environmental Policy Instruments. Edward Elgar. ISBN 978-1-84980-466-0.
- Jordan, Andrew; Moore, Brendan (2020). Durable by Design? Policy Feedback in a Changing Climate. Cambridge University Press. ISBN 978-1-108-49001-6.

=== Edited books ===
- O’Riordan, T., Cameron, J. & Jordan, A. (eds.) (2001). Re-interpreting the Precautionary Principle. Cameron and May.
- Jordan, A.J. (ed.) (2002). Environmental Policy in the European Union: Actors, Institutions and Processes. Earthscan.
- Jordan, Andrew; Wurzel, Rüdiger; Zito, Anthony (eds.) (2003). New Instruments of Environmental Governance. Frank Cass. ISBN 978-0-7146-8300-3.
- Jordan, Andrew; Liefferink, Duncan (eds.) (2004). Environmental Policy in Europe: The Europeanization of National Environmental Policy. Routledge. ISBN 978-0-415-40679-6.
- Jordan, Andrew (ed.) (2005). Environmental Policy in the European Union: Actors, Institutions and Processes (2nd ed.). Earthscan. ISBN 978-1844071583.
- Bache, Ian; Jordan, Andrew (eds.) (2006). The Europeanization of British Politics. Palgrave Macmillan. ISBN 978-0-230-20489-8.
- Jordan, Andrew; Lenschow, Andrea (eds.) (2008). Innovation in Environmental Policy? Integrating the Environment for Sustainability. Edward Elgar. ISBN 978-1-84844-706-6.
- Adger, Neil; Jordan, Andrew (eds.) (2009). Governing Sustainability. Cambridge University Press. ISBN 978-0-521-73243-7.
- Jordan, Andrew; Huitema, Dave; van Asselt, Harro; Rayner, Tim; Berkhout, Frans (eds.) (2010). Climate Change Policy in the European Union: Confronting the Dilemmas of Mitigation and Adaptation? Cambridge University Press. ISBN 978-0-521-20890-1.
- Jordan, Andrew; Adelle, Camilla (ed.) (2013). Environmental Policy in the European Union: Contexts, Actors and Policy Dynamics (3rd ed.). Routledge. ISBN 978-1-84971-469-3.
- Bauer, Michael; Jordan, Andrew; Green-Pedersen, Christoffer; Héritier, Adrienne (eds.) (2012). Dismantling Public Policy: Preferences, Strategies and Effects. Oxford University Press. ISBN 978-0-19-965664-6.
- Jordan, Andrew; Turnpenny, John (eds.) (2015). The Tools of Policy Formulation: Actors, Capacities, Venues and Effects. Edward Elgar. ISBN 978-1-78347-703-6.
- Jordan, Andrew; Huitema, Dave; van Asselt, Harro; Forster, Johanna (eds.) (2018). The Governance of Climate Change: Polycentricity in Action? Cambridge University Press. ISBN 978-1-108-41812-6.
- Jordan, Andrew; Gravey, Viviane (ed.) (2021). Environmental Policy in the European Union: Actors, Contexts and Policy Dynamics (4th ed.). Routledge. ISBN 978-1-138-39216-8.
- Rayner, Tim; Szulecki, Kacper; Jordan, Andrew; Oberthür, Sebastian (eds.) (2023). Handbook on European Union Climate Change Policy and Politics. Edward Elgar. ISBN 978-1-78990-697-4.
