= Climate Change Isn't Everything: Liberating Climate Politics from Alarmism =

Non-fiction book published in 2023

- Author: Mike Hulme
- Language: English
- Subjects: Climate change
- Publisher: Polity Press
- Publication date: 2023
- Pages: 208
- ISBN: 9781509556168

Climate Change Isn’t Everything: Liberating Climate Politics from Alarmism is a book by Mike Hulme published in 2023 by Polity Press.

== Synopsis ==
Climate Change Isn't Everything: Liberating Climate Politics from Alarmism is a book by Mike Hulme, Professor of Human Geography at the University of Cambridge, where the author introduces the readers to his meaning of the term / neologism 'climatism'. According to a blurb for the book offered by Ted Nordhaus of the Breakthrough Institute climatism reduces the condition of the world to the fate of global temperature or to the atmospheric concentration of Carbon dioxide, to the detriment of tackling serious issues as varied as poverty, liberty, biodiversity loss, inequality and international diplomacy. Hulme notes that the term has been used before, and noticeably in Steve Goreham's Climatism, Science, Common Sense and the 21st Century Hottest Topic, New Lenox Books 2010. While Goreham contest the human origin of climate change, Hulme holds the opposite view, p. 168.

== Main ==
The author opens the book with a discussion of how the Syrian Civil War, started in March 2011 after civil unrest following the torture by President Assad's security agents of young Syrians schoolboys, was blamed on climate change: according to the narrative, a multi-year drought had displaced agricultural labourers to towns and cities, with a consequent unrest for lack of available jobs.

The narrative was upheld by authoritative figures such as the US secretary of state John Kerry, President Barack Obama, Prince Charles and important institutions such as the World Bank, Friends of the Earth. As a result, in the following years the flux of migrants escaping the civil war was likewise blamed on climate change by the President of the European Commission Jean-Claude Juncker, p. 2.

Hulme disagrees with this narrative and argues that blaming the civil war in Syria, the increase of hate speech and racist tweets on Twitter, or floods devastation on climate is ultimately a distraction from tackling their major underlying causes. p. 2.

According to a review Hulme is clear that he believes human behaviour is changing the climate and that society should move toward net zero emissions.

Hulme compares 'climatic determinism' to racial determinism in presenting value-based judgments as science and offers an alternative based on what he calls climatic pragmatism, as a recipe that is contextually sensitive, diverse and pragmatic (p. 11 of Hulme's book).

Still for review the author – living a tension between critique and sympathy regarding climate change – is aware of the risk of his work being appropriated by climate deniers, and has accepted the risk to fight what he perceives as the dangers of climatism.

Each chapter ends with a section entitled 'Retort' where likely objections are discussed, and a 'Further Reading' section at the end of the book offers suggestions relating to climate science, the relation between expertise, politics and democracy, the different meanings of climate change, the power of narratives, climate reductionism and climate anxieties.

For Hulme climate change has become the lens through which we perceive and address societal challenges. This has made climate as a "self-sufficient" narrative capable of explaining political, socio-ecological, and ethical dilemmas.

Hulme dedicates a chapter to reconstruct the genesis of climatism in ten "moves", Among these, the adoption of global temperature as a "flawed index for capturing the full range of complex relationships between climate and human welfare and ecological integrity" (move 3) appear as especially relevant.

For Hulme the moves have led to the ideology of climatism, making climate change into the "leitmotif of contemporary politics."

A final chapter entitled "If Not Climatism, Then What?" offers Hulme's recipes, under the banner that "Wicked problems need clumsy solutions": these include foregrounding scientific uncertainty, defusing deadline-ism, and acknowledging the plurality of values and goals as.

== The chapters ==
A succinct summary of the book chapter by chapter is offered in:

1. 'From Climate to climatism', How an Ideology is Made. Introduces climatism as an ideology.
2. 'How did Climatism Arise', Fetishizing Global Temperature. Describes the ascent of climatism in ten "moves".
3. 'Are the Sciences Climatist', The Noble Lie and Other Misdemeanors.Presents use and misuse of climate scenarios, with particular attention to IPCC's Representative Concentration Pathway 8.5.
4. 'Why is Climatism So Alluring', Master-Narratives and Polarizing Moralism. The main ingredient of climatism: climatism as a master narrative, its Manichean worldview and its apocalyptic rhetoric.
5. 'Why is Climatism Dangerous', The Narrowing of Political Vision. Exemplifies the perverse effects of compressing all ailment of the world under a single heading, unlike the broad spectrum of the sustainable development goals. The case of deforestation in Indonesia driven by European Union biofuel policies.
6. 'If Not Climatism, Then What', Wicked Problems Need Clumsy Solutions. Gives a recipe for progress: replace a culture of hubris with one of humility, discontinue presenting the future in terms of cliff-edges or no-return points, embrace a plurality of values and perspectives, including site-, culture- and context-specific values and perspectives.

== Reception ==
The reception of the book is varied. For Teresa de León:

Hulme has the merit of having shown how the social encounter with nature has been narrowed by a generic distinction of villains and saviors of the Earth, which has triggered ethical reflections about what is more socially sensitive to nature and what is not.

For Volker Hahn, writing in the blog of Roger Pielke Jr.:

Hulme's book may not deliver radically new or surprising insights. But it is a concise digest of the current climate discourse and depicts where things are going wrong.

For Nicholas Clairmont writing in The New Atlantis:

The book is a welcome remedy for a climate discourse beset by scientization, the antidemocratic process by which "scientific statements substitute — or at least become a short-hand — for ethical or political reasoning and argument."

A more critical view is offered by Simon Maxwell:

It's hard to decide whether Mike Hulme's new book is: (a) a salutary warning to over-enthusiastic advocates of climate action, (b) a case of over-egging the pudding in regard to same, or (c) and despite protestations to the contrary, a gift to climate deniers. The book has elements of all three, but I confess Hulme's central assertion, that 'climatism' has emerged as a technocratic, pervasive and apocalyptic 'ideology' which explains all the world's ills and claims pre-eminence in policy, strikes me mainly as a case of over-egging the pudding.
