= Why We Disagree About Climate Change =

2009 English-language book by Mike Hulme

- Author: Mike Hulme
- Language: English
- Subject: Global Warming
- Publisher: Cambridge University Press
- Publication date: 30 April 2009
- Publication place: Britain
- Pages: 432
- ISBN: 978-0-521-72732-7

Why We Disagree About Climate Change: Understanding Controversy, Inaction and Opportunity is a 2009 book by Mike Hulme. It was published by the Cambridge University Press. As of September 2017 it has sold over 18,000 copies. In 2009 it was selected by The Economist magazine as one of its science and technology 'Books of the Year' and in 2010 was jointly awarded the Gerald L Young Prize for the best book in human ecology.

== Synopsis ==
Why We Disagree About Climate Change is an exploration on how the idea of climate change has taken such a dominant position in modern politics and why it is so contested. In the book, the author looks at the differing views from various disciplines, including natural science, economics, ethics, social psychology and politics, to try to explain why people disagree about climate change. The book argues that climate change, rather than being a problem to be solved, is an idea which reveals different individual and collective beliefs, values and attitudes about ways of living in the world.

== Reception ==
Max Boykoff writing for Nature Reports Climate Change said, "Overall, Hulme articulates quite complex arguments in a remarkably clear and effective manner. He not only covers a lot of ground, but by avoiding an overly compartmentalized approach he achieves a great deal of connectivity throughout the book. For those who are regularly immersed in the social sciences literature on climate change, the content itself may not hold many surprises. But Hulme's approach makes these arguments accessible and meaningful for a wider audience, and this tome could also serve as a great teaching text".

Steven Yearley writing for The Times Higher Education said, "This is a distinctive and courageous book. Mike Hulme is a geographer and climate modeller, a contributor to the Intergovernmental Panel on Climate Change (IPCC) and professor of climate change at the infamously hacked University of East Anglia. He must be acutely aware of the temptation not to give an inch. It would be entirely understandable if he presented to the world only assertions about the robustness and persuasiveness of the scientific understanding of climate change, and followed them up with strict warnings to take measures to limit further climate-damaging emissions".

Stuart Blackman writing for The Register said, "In his new book, Why We Disagree About Climate Change, he explores how the issue of climate change has come to be such a dominant issue in modern politics. He treats climate change not as a problem that we need to solve – indeed, he believes that the complexity of the issue means that it cannot be solved, only lived with – and instead considers it as much of a cultural idea as a physical phenomenon."

Natasha Mitchell writing on her ABC blog said, "It's a book that some may be surprised to see from a scientist who has been a central contributor to establishing the international scientific consensus on climate change. It's wide reaching...delving into the realms of faith, politics, sociology, risk, media, history, psychology and beyond, to dig beneath the often tediously polarised public discourse on climate change."

Duncan Green, the head of research for Oxfam GB has said, "First what the book is not. It is not a polemic, nor an attempt to ‘settle' the argument with climate change deniers. It's much more interesting than that. Hulme stands back and looks at the broader significance of climate and climate change, from the viewpoint of science, economics, religion, psychology, media, development and governance. If you want an intelligent take on the IPCC, the Stern Report, the disagreements between North and South – it's all here. His intent is to show that the disputes over climate change are not just (or even mainly) about the science, which is in any case hugely uncertain. Rather they are deeply rooted in all aspects of the human condition."

Richard D. North writing on his personal website said, "Most of the books on global warming science and policy are pretty muddled, hysterical or dreamy by turns. Very few have real quality. Mike Hulme's book, Why We Disagree About Climate Change seems to be in a different class".

== See also ==
- Global warming controversy
- What's the Worst That Could Happen?: A Rational Response to the Climate Change Debate
