= Kevin Anderson (scientist) =

British scientist and climate advocate

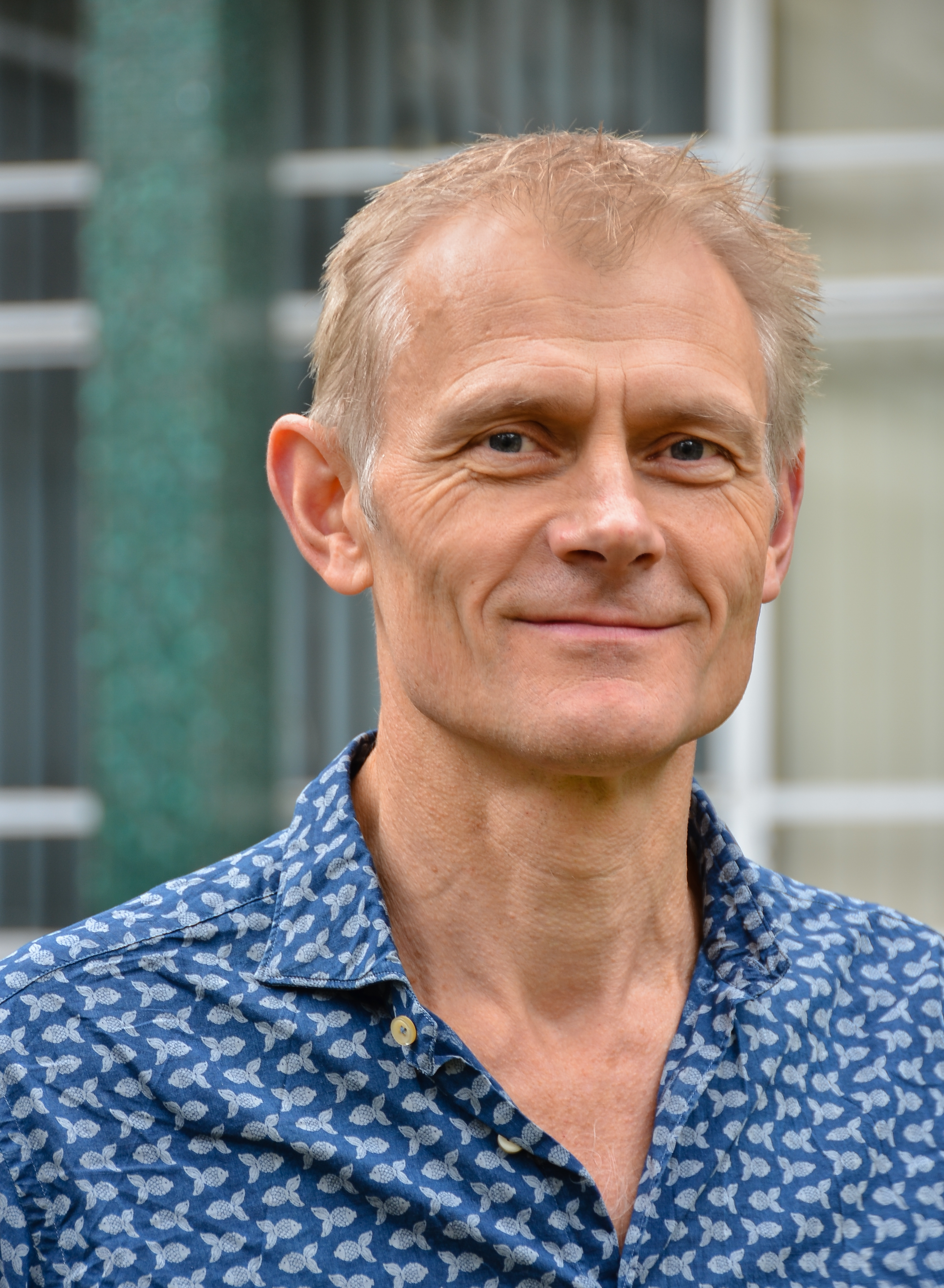
- Kevin Anderson at the University of Manchester
- Born: 28 June 1962
- Occupation: Climate Scientist

Kevin Anderson (born 28 June 1962) is a British climate scientist.

== Life ==
He is Professor of Energy and Climate Change, holding a joint chair in the School of Engineering at the University of Manchester (UK), the Centre for Sustainability and the Environment (CEMUS) at Uppsala University (Sweden). He was involved with the Centre for Climate and Energy Transformation (CET) at Bergen University (Norway). In 2016 he began a two year fellowship as the Zennström Professor of Climate Change Leadership in Uppsala, where he continues to work today, and has previously been both Deputy Director and Director of the Tyndall Centre for Climate Change Research.

Prof. Anderson has been a contributor to many climate conferences, including the 4 Degrees and Beyond International Climate Conference in 2009. A video of his presentation is available online.

In 2022, with a previous Tyndall Centre colleague Dr Dan Calverley, he established a new project Climate Uncensored, providing "robust, unflinching commentary and assessment of the scale of the climate challenge and our responses to it". Acknowledging "the inspiring and often courageous work of the climate science community .. when it comes to cutting emissions, there is a widespread failure to accept the true scale and urgency of the challenge. Such 'mitigation denial' is rife, even within the expert community." Climate Uncensored focuses on cutting emissions, taking its lead from the Paris commitment to hold the global temperature rise to 'well below 2 °C and pursuing efforts to limit the increase to 1.5 °C'. it is guided by the IPCC's carbon budgets and strives to remain cognisant of issues of equity and fairness.

== Publications ==
Publications are listed on his web page.

In early 2011 a paper he co-authored with Alice Bows was published in a special issue of a Royal Society journal with other papers from the above conference. The Anderson and Bows "analysis suggests that despite high-level statements to the contrary, there is now little to no chance of maintaining the global mean surface temperature at or below 2 °C. Moreover, the impacts associated with 2 °C have been revised upwards, sufficiently so that 2 °C now more appropriately represents the threshold between 'dangerous' and 'extremely dangerous' climate change."

"Put bluntly, while the rhetoric of policy is to reduce emissions in line with avoiding dangerous climate change, most policy advice is to accept a high probability of extremely dangerous climate change rather than propose radical and immediate emission reductions."

...

"The analysis within this paper offers a stark and unremitting assessment of the climate change challenge facing the global community. There is now little to no chance of maintaining the rise in global mean surface temperature at below 2 °C, despite repeated high-level statements to the contrary. Moreover, the impacts associated with 2 °C have been revised upwards (e.g. [20,21]), sufficiently so that 2 °C now more appropriately represents the threshold between dangerous and extremely dangerous climate change. Consequently, and with tentative signs of global emissions returning to their earlier levels of growth, 2010 represents a political tipping point. The science of climate change allied with emission pathways for Annex 1 and non-Annex 1 nations suggests a profound departure in the scale and scope of the mitigation and adaption challenge from that detailed in many other analyses, particularly those directly informing policy."

"However, this paper is not intended as a message of futility, but rather a bare and perhaps brutal assessment of where our 'rose-tinted' and well intentioned (though ultimately ineffective) approach to climate change has brought us. Real hope and opportunity, if it is to arise at all, will do so from a raw and dispassionate assessment of the scale of the challenge faced by the global community. This paper is intended as a small contribution to such a vision and future of hope."

== News stories ==
In a story in The Daily Telegraph of London preceding the 2010 COP 16 climate summit in Cancun, he said that politicians should consider a rationing system like the one introduced during the last "time of crisis" in the 1930s and 40s, meaning not necessarily a recession or a worse lifestyle but making adjustments in everyday life such as using public transport and wearing a sweater rather than turning on the heating. "Our emissions were a lot less ten years ago and we got by ok then."

In a BBC story in November 2009 he clarified further:

"When you have something essential like energy that you can't ration just on price – you have to ration it in a more equitable way. So I would suggest for the high reduction rates that we now need, we need something based on equity and whether it's personal carbon trading or whatever, we have to make sure the poorer parts of our communities have access to energy regardless of price. So that means for the rest of us, who consume lots of energy we are going to have to make significant reductions to our levels of emissions – there is no way round this."

A 2009 story in The Times of London, several months prior to the December 2009 Copenhagen climate summit (COP 15), reported:

"Professor Anderson (and a colleague) expect politicians at the summit merely to pay lip service to scientific evidence that greenhouse gas emissions need to be brought under control within a decade, if not sooner. They said that rather than wait for an international accord it was time now to consider what action could be taken. We all hope that Copenhagen will succeed but I think it will fail. 'We won't come up with a global agreement,' Professor Anderson said. 'I think we will negotiate, there will be a few fudges and there will be a very weak daughter of Kyoto. I doubt it will be significantly based on the science of climate change'. He is certain that negotiators will place a heavy reliance on technological solutions that have yet to be invented or proven, rather than recognise the scale and urgency of the problem."

Just before the 2009 Copenhagen summit, the Scotsman reported:

"Current Met Office projections reveal that the lack of action in the intervening 17 years – in which emissions of climate changing gases such as carbon dioxide have soared – has set the world on a path towards potential 4C rises as early as 2060, and 6C rises by the end of the century. Anderson, who advises the government on climate change, said the consequences were 'terrifying'. 'For humanity it's a matter of life or death,' he said. 'We will not make all human beings extinct as a few people with the right sort of resources may put themselves in the right parts of the world and survive. But I think it's extremely unlikely that we wouldn't have mass death at 4C. If you have got a population of nine billion by 2050 and you hit 4C, 5C or 6C, you might have half a billion people surviving'."

The Guardian reported in 2006 on Anderson's conclusions on reliance on energy efficiency versus nuclear power:

"Dr Anderson said the separate demands of the transport and heating sectors meant that nuclear power supplied only about 3.6% of total UK energy used. Replacing nuclear reactors with gas and coal power stations by 2020 would raise carbon emissions by 4%–8%, he said. 'We could very easily compensate for that with moderate increases in energy efficiency. If you've got money to spend on tackling climate change then you don't spend it on supply. You spend it on reducing demand."
