= Jennie Stephens =

American-Irish academic researcher, professor, author and social justice advocate

Jennie C. Stephens
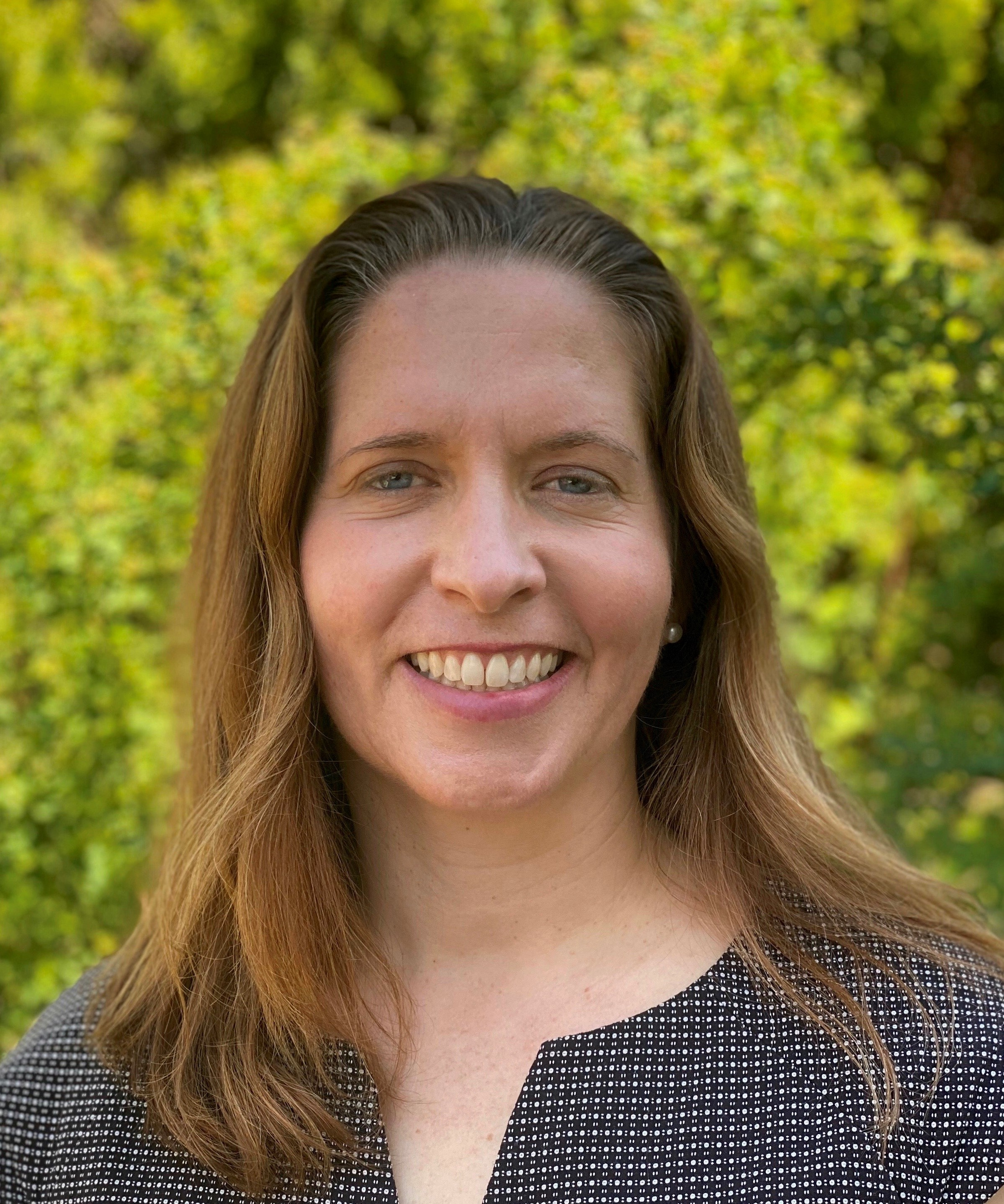
- Born: March 8, 1975 (age 51); Dublin, Ireland
- Occupations: Professor, author, and social justice advocate
- Awards: Arab-American Frontiers Fellowship, National Academy of Sciences; Leopold Leadership Fellowship, Stanford Woods Institute for the Environment

Academic background
- Education: B.A., Environmental Science & Public Policy, Harvard University, 1997; M.S., Environmental Science & Engineering, Caltech, 1998; Ph.D., Environmental Science & Engineering, Caltech, 2002
- Alma mater: Harvard University; California Institute of Technology
- Website: https://www.jenniecstephens.com/

Jennie C. Stephens (born March 8, 1975, in Dublin, Ireland) is an academic researcher, professor, author, and social justice advocate. She is Professor of Sustainability Science & Policy at Northeastern University in Boston, Massachusetts. She is also affiliated with the Women's, Gender and Sexuality Studies Program, the department of Civil & Environmental Engineering and the department of Cultures, Societies & Global Studies.

Stephens has worked extensively on energy system innovation and the societal transformation away from fossil fuel reliance. Her research mainly focuses on renewable energy transformation, energy democracy, energy resilience, gender and energy, climate and energy justice, and climate engineering. She is the author of Diversifying Power: Why We Need Anti-Racist, Feminist Leadership on Climate and Energy, Smart Grid (R)Evolution: Electric Power Struggles, Climate Change: An Encyclopedia of Science and History.

== Education ==
Stephens received her bachelor's degree in Environmental Science and Public Policy from Harvard University in 1997. She then enrolled at California Institute of Technology and earned her Master's and Doctoral Degree in Environmental Science and Engineering in 1998 and 2002, respectively. Her dissertation advisor at Caltech was Janet Hering, and while at Caltech she also completed a graduate minor in Science, Ethics and Society.

== Career ==
Following her Doctoral Degree, Stephens served as Post-Doctoral Research Scholar at the Belfer Center for Science and International Affairs at Harvard Kennedy School from 2002 till 2005. During this time she also held brief appointments as Adjunct Lecturer at Tufts University and Boston University in 2003, and as a Visiting Lecturer at Massachusetts Institute of Technology in 2004. She was appointed by Clark University as Assistant Professor of Environmental Science and Policy in 2005, and was promoted to Associate Professor in 2012. She was twice appointed as Research Associate at the Harvard Kennedy School from 2005 till 2011 and then in 2013. In 2014, she joined the faculty of the University of Vermont (UVM) as an endowed Professor; she was the inaugural Blittersdorf Professor of Sustainability Science and Policy. At UVM, she was a faculty member in the Rubenstein School of Environment and Natural Resources and also an affiliate at the Gund Institute. In 2016, she became the Dean's Professor of Sustainability Science and Policy at Northeastern University. In 2024, she became Professor of Climate Justice at Maynooth University's ICARUS Climate Research Centre.

== Research ==
Stephens's research primarily focuses on renewable energy transformation, energy democracy, energy resilience, gender and energy, reducing fossil fuel reliance, and climate engineering. She has also conducted research on the role of higher education in advancing sustainability and a transformation toward a more just and equitable society.

=== Education as a change agent ===
Stephens conducted a study in 2008 to increase the consideration for the potential in context of institutions of higher education to be the change agents for sustainability in different cultures and contexts. She also highlighted the challenges associated with accelerating environmental change, resource scarcity, increasing inequality and injustice. In her study, she explored the theoretical framework of transition management (TM) to promote change in social systems, and to provide guidance in terms of informing and prioritizing future empirical research regarding the sustainability in higher education.

Stephens conducted a study on the processes, opportunities and challenges of shared action learning, and presented five stages in this context, including project impetus, reflection and reporting, contextual research and project planning, community engagement and project refinement, and action. She defined shared action learning as "a process in which students, faculty, and community sponsors share learning experiences while working on sustainability projects for a specific community", and also discussed its applications in context of different communities across the globe.

=== Energy democracy ===
In 2018, Stephens along with co-authors presented a critical review based on political power and renewable energy futures, and theorized connections between energy systems and democratic political power. Furthermore, she highlighted the opportunities that renewable energy opens in context of democratic energy development. She has discussed energy democracy in terms of goals, outcomes and policy instruments for sociotechnical transitions. Her research has enhanced the visibility of the energy democracy movement, and has evaluated the policy instruments advanced by its advocates.

With Matt Burke, Elizabeth Wilson and Tarla Rai Peterson, Stephens proposed a framework called, Socio-Political Evaluation of Energy Deployment, for the integrated analysis of legal, political, economic, and social factors that influence energy technology deployment decisions at the state level to increase awareness regarding the interconnections and enable accelerated change in energy infrastructure of society. In 2012, she conducted an analysis of a sustainable energy cluster for regional economic development in context of Central Massachusetts. Results of her study suggested that sustainable energy cluster initiatives have the potential to accelerate change in entrenched energy regimes by generating regional ‘buzz’ around sustainable energy activities, promoting institutional thickness, and developing trust among stakeholders in the region. Furthermore, she assessed innovation dynamics of carbon capture and storage (CCS) and enhanced geothermal systems (EGS), and emphasized the potential of these emerging energy technologies in terms of minimizing greenhouse gas emissions from electrical power generation in the United States.

=== Climate resilience ===
In her work regarding climate resilience, Stephens regarded wind power as an important climate change mitigation technology, and rapidly growing renewable energy technology in context of the United States. She conducted a comparative content and frame analysis of newspaper coverage regarding wind power in Texas, Minnesota, and Massachusetts, and explored state-level variations in the salience of wind in public discourse. She has also focused her study on the growing interest in carbon capture and storage (CCS) in terms of climate change mitigation, and discussed the influence of government and international treaties in context of CCS initiatives. Furthermore, she has described the tensions within a shared smart grid vision and demonstrated how competing societal priorities influence electricity system innovation.

== Awards and honors ==
- 1998-1999 - Graduate Fellowship, National Science Foundation (NSF)
- 1999-2002 - Fellowship for Graduate Study, USEPA Science to Achieve Results (STAR) Program
- 2014 - Conference Award, Henry J. Leir Luxembourg Program-Clark University
- 2015 - 2016 - Leopold Leadership Fellowship, Stanford Woods Institute for the Environment
- 2017 - Arab-American Frontiers Fellowship, National Academy of Sciences

== Bibliography ==
=== Books ===
- Climate Change: An Encyclopedia of Science and History, Volume 1 (2013) ISBN 9781598847611
- Smart Grid (R) Evolution (2015) ISBN 9781107047280
- Diversifying Power: Why We Need Anti-Racist, Feminist Leadership on Climate & Energy (2020) ISBN 9781642831313

=== Selected articles ===
- Stephens, Jennie C.; Hernandez, Maria E.; Román, Mikael; Graham, Amanda C.; Scholz, Roland W. (11 July 2008). "Higher education as a change agent for sustainability in different cultures and contexts". International Journal of Sustainability in Higher Education. 9 (3): 317–338. Bibcode:2008IJSHE...9..317S. doi:10.1108/14676370810885916.
- Stephens, Jennie C.; Wilson, Elizabeth J.; Peterson, Tarla Rai (October 2008). "Socio-Political Evaluation of Energy Deployment (SPEED): An integrated research framework analyzing energy technology deployment". Technological Forecasting and Social Change. 75 (8): 1224–1246. doi:10.1016/j.techfore.2007.12.003.
- Stephens, Jennie C.; Graham, Amanda C. (May 2010). "Toward an empirical research agenda for sustainability in higher education: exploring the transition management framework". Journal of Cleaner Production. 18 (7): 611–618. doi:10.1016/j.jclepro.2009.07.009.
- Burke, Matthew J.; Stephens, Jennie C. (November 2017). "Energy democracy: Goals and policy instruments for sociotechnical transitions". Energy Research & Social Science. 33: 35–48. Bibcode:2017ERSS...33...35B. doi:10.1016/j.erss.2017.09.024.
- Burke, Matthew J.; Stephens, Jennie C. (January 2018). "Political power and renewable energy futures: A critical review". Energy Research & Social Science. 35: 78–93. Bibcode:2018ERSS...35...78B. doi:10.1016/j.erss.2017.10.018.
- Stephens, Jennie C.; Surprise, Kevin (2020). "The hidden injustices of advancing solar geoengineering research". Global Sustainability. 3: e2. Bibcode:2020GlSus...3E...2S. doi:10.1017/sus.2019.28. S2CID 214086219.

=== Selected OP-EDS ===
- Banks, Jasmine; Stephens, Jennie C. (14 December 2020). "Advancing Racial Justice Means Ending Fossil Fuel Reliance". Dame Magazine.
- "Climate crisis demands diverse leadership". Bangor Daily News. Tribune Content Agency. 15 August 2020.
- Ayala, Christine (18 April 2021). "Climate manipulation? Not all 'solutions' should be advanced". TheHill.
