= Mike Hulme =

British geographer and climatologist

- Born: 23 July 1960 (age 66); London, England
- Education: Durham University (BSc); Swansea University (PhD)
- Scientific career
- Fields: Climatology; Human Geography
- Workplaces: University of Cambridge; King's College London; University of East Anglia; University of Salford
- Thesis: Secular climatic and hydrological change in central Sudan (1985)
- Website: www.mikehulme.org

Mike Hulme (born 23 July 1960) is a British geographer and academic who is Professor of Human Geography at the University of Cambridge. His research focuses on scientific, historical, cultural and political dimensions of climate change, including the development of climate knowledge, the communication of climate science and the relationship between scientific assessments and public policy. He was the founding director of the Tyndall Centre for Climate Change Research from 2000 to 2007 and was previously a professor at the University of East Anglia and King's College London..

His books include Why We Disagree About Climate Change (2009), Can Science Fix Climate Change? (2014), Weathered: Cultures of Climate (2017) and Climate Change Isn't Everything (2023).

== Early life and education ==
Hulme was born in London on 23 July 1960. He attended Madras College in St Andrews from 1974 to 1978. He studied geography at Durham University, graduating with a Bachelor of Science degree in 1981. He subsequently undertook doctoral research at the University of Wales, Swansea, receiving a PhD in applied climatology in 1985. His thesis, Secular Climatic and Hydrological Change in Central Sudan, examined long-term changes in climate and hydrology in the region.

== Academic career ==
=== Early climatology research ===
Hulme began his academic career as a lecturer in geography at the University of Salford, where he worked from 1984 to 1988. In 1986, he also undertook a visiting teaching appointment at the University of Zimbabwe. In 1988, he joined the University of East Anglia (UEA), initially working in its Climatic Research Unit (CRU). He became a reader in the unit in 1998 and later held a professorship in climate change in the university's School of Environmental Sciences.

His early research focused on the analysis of observed climate records, precipitation and the development of climate datasets. His work included the examination of rainfall variability in Africa, particularly in the Sahel and the Nile Basin, and the use of historical observations to investigate changes in regional climate. His doctoral research on central Sudan formed part of this wider interest in the relationship between climate variability, hydrology and environmental change.

At the CRU, Hulme worked on the compilation and analysis of global climate datasets and the development of climate-change scenarios. These scenarios were used to examine possible regional effects of climate change and to inform assessments of vulnerability and adaptation. He also contributed to research on the evaluation of climate models and the representation of uncertainty in climate projections.

=== Tyndall Centre for Climate Change Research ===
In 2000, Hulme became the founding executive director of the Tyndall Centre for Climate Change Research, a research partnership involving several UK institutions and based at UEA. He directed the centre until 2007. Its work brought together researchers from the natural sciences, social sciences and other disciplines to investigate the causes and consequences of climate change and possible responses to it.

During his directorship, Hulme was involved in research and policy projects examining climate-change adaptation and mitigation. He was a co-investigator in the European Union-funded project ADAM (Adaptation and Mitigation Strategies: Supporting European Climate Policy), which ran from 2006 to 2009. The project examined the effectiveness and feasibility of European climate policies and the relationship between adaptation and emissions reduction.

=== Work with the Intergovernmental Panel on Climate Change ===
Hulme contributed to the work of the Intergovernmental Panel on Climate Change (IPCC), including its second and third assessment cycles. His responsibilities included work on climate scenarios and the distribution of climate data. He served as a contributing author, lead author and review editor in the preparation of the IPCC's Third Assessment Report, published in 2001.

He received a personalised certificate from the IPCC in 2007 in recognition of his contribution to the organisation's work. That year, the IPCC shared the Nobel Peace Prize with Al Gore.

Hulme later wrote and edited work examining the role of the IPCC as a scientific and policy institution. His research considered how large scientific assessments establish authority, organise expert knowledge and communicate uncertainty. In 2022, he co-edited A Critical Assessment of the Intergovernmental Panel on Climate Change, a collection examining the organisation's history, methods and place in international climate governance.

=== King's College London and University of Cambridge ===
In 2013, Hulme joined King's College London as Professor of Climate and Culture in its Department of Geography. He established the university's MA programme in Climate Change: History, Culture, Society and served as head of the department from 2016 to 2017. His work at King's developed the historical and cultural dimensions of his earlier research on climate science and policy.

Hulme joined the University of Cambridge in 2017 as Professor of Human Geography in its Department of Geography. He became a Fellow and Trustee of Pembroke College, Cambridge, in 2018 and serves as the college's Director of Studies in Geography. At Cambridge, he has taught and supervised research on the Anthropocene, environmental knowledge, climate change and the politics of expertise. He was head of the Department of Geography from 2022 to 2023 and was the founding programme director of the university's MPhil in Anthropocene Studies from 2020 to 2025.

At Cambridge, Hulme has continued research on the history of climate science, the construction of environmental knowledge and the relationship between climate and society. He has also been involved in interdisciplinary work linking geography with the history and philosophy of science.

== Research ==
=== Climate science and the social sciences ===
Hulme's research has developed from physical climatology towards the study of the relationships between climate science, society and culture. His early work examined climate observations, rainfall patterns, climate datasets and the construction of regional climate scenarios. Later research addressed how climate knowledge is produced, interpreted and used by scientists, governments, the media and the public.

He has argued that scientific evidence is essential to understanding changes in the climate system but does not, by itself, determine how societies interpret the issue or decide what policies to pursue. His research draws on human geography, environmental history, science and technology studies.

His work has also considered the role of uncertainty in climate science and the limits of prediction.

=== Climate communication and public understanding ===
Hulme's book Why We Disagree About Climate Change (2009) examined why climate change has generated different interpretations and political responses. Rather than treating disagreement solely as a dispute over scientific findings, the book considered the influence of values, religion, culture, economics and public communication. It explored how the idea of climate change had moved beyond the natural sciences into areas such as international relations, development, ethics and popular culture.

The book received attention in academic and public discussions of climate policy. It was selected by The Economist as one of its science and technology books of the year in 2009 and received the Gerald L. Young Human Ecology Book Award in 2010. Cambridge University Press later included it in a selection of influential books published by the press during its first century.

=== Climate, history and culture ===
Hulme's later research has examined the historical development of ideas about climate and the changing ways in which societies have understood their relationships with weather and the environment. His book Weathered: Cultures of Climate (2017) explored the cultural meanings attached to weather and climate, drawing on examples from history, geography, literature and public life.

From 2019, he was a co-investigator, with historians of science Richard Staley and Simon Schaffer, on the University of Cambridge's Leverhulme-funded research project Making Climate History. The project examined the historical connections between the development of climate science, energy systems, industrial activity and the production of knowledge about global climate change.

== Other activities ==
He advised the All-Party Parliamentary Climate Change Group from 2015 to 2016 and was involved in advisory work for the UK Climate Impacts Programme and the British Council.

He also served on research advisory bodies and review panels concerned with climate science, environmental change and research policy, including those associated with the European Research Council, the Potsdam Institute for Climate Impact Research and the UK Energy Research Centre.

Hulme has written commentaries and opinion pieces for publications including The Guardian, The Wall Street Journal, The Times and New Scientist. His articles have addressed climate communication, scientific uncertainty, climate policy, adaptation and the role of technology in responding to environmental change.

In October 2020, Hulme signed the Great Barrington Declaration, a statement opposing general lockdown policies during the COVID-19 pandemic and advocating an alternative approach to protecting people considered at high risk.

== Editorial work ==
He was joint senior editor of Climate Research from 1997 to 2001 and co-editor-in-chief of Global Environmental Change from 2003 to 2009. He was the founding editor-in-chief of WIREs Climate Change, a review journal published by Wiley, from 2009 to 2022.

== Publications ==
- Hulme, Mike; Barrow, Elaine, eds. (1997). Climates of the British Isles: present, past, and future. London ; New York: Routledge. ISBN 978-0-415-13016-5.
- Hulme, Mike (2009). Why We Disagree about Climate Change: Understanding Controversy, Inaction and Opportunity. Cambridge: Cambridge University Press. doi:10.1017/CBO9780511841200. ISBN 978-0-521-89869-0.
- Hulme, Mike (2010). Making climate change work for us: European perspectives on adaptation and mitigation strategies. Cambridge: Cambridge University Press. ISBN 978-1-107-67138-6.
- Hulme, Mike (2013). Exploring climate change through science and in society: an anthology of Mike Hulme's essays, interviews and speeches. London ; New York: Earthscan, from Routledge. doi:10.4324/9780203070079. ISBN 978-0-415-81162-0.
- Hulme, Mike (2014). Can science fix climate change? A case against climate engineering. New human frontiers series. Cambridge: Polity Press. ISBN 978-0-7456-8205-1.
- Hulme, Mike (2017). Weathered: cultures of climate. London: SAGE Publications Ltd. doi:10.4135/9781473957749. ISBN 978-1-4739-5774-9.
- Castree, Noel; Hulme, Mike; Proctor, James D., eds. (2018). Companion to environmental studies. London ; New York: Routledge. ISBN 978-1-138-19220-1.
- Hulme, Mike, ed. (2020). Contemporary climate change debates: a student primer. London ; New York: Routledge, Taylor & Francis Group. doi:10.4324/9780429446252. ISBN 978-1-138-33299-7.
- Hulme, Mike (2022). Climate change. Key ideas in geography. London: Routledge, Taylor and Francis Group. ISBN 978-1-000-41323-6.
- Hulme, Mike (31 December 2022). De Pryck, Kari (ed.). A Critical Assessment of the Intergovernmental Panel on Climate Change (1 ed.). Cambridge University Press. doi:10.1017/9781009082099. ISBN 978-1-009-08209-9.
- Hulme, Mike. "Climate Change isn't Everything: Liberating Climate Politics from Alarmism | Wiley". Wiley.com.

== Awards and recognition ==
- 1995: Hugh Robert Mill Prize, awarded by the Royal Meteorological Society
- 2009: Selection of Why We Disagree About Climate Change as one of The Economist's science and technology books of the year.
- 2010: Joint winner of the Gerald L. Young Human Ecology Book Award for Why We Disagree About Climate Change.
- 2012: Editor's Award from the American Meteorological Society's Bulletin for reviewer comments.
- 2021: Eduard Brückner Prize, awarded by the German Meteorological Society
