= DR P8 Jazz =

Denmark
- Broadcast area: Denmark – Nationally via Digital Audio Broadcasting (DAB)
- Frequency: DAB+: MUX2

Programming
- Language: Danish
- Format: Jazz

Ownership
- Owner: DR
- Operator: DR

History
- First air date: 12 September 2011; 14 years ago

Links
- Webcast: Web Stream; HTTP progressive Streams: (Shoutcast, 92 Kbps MP3); (Shoutcast, 192 Kbps MP3); HLS Streams: (192 Kbps AAC)
- Website: www.dr.dk/p8jazz/

DR P8 Jazz is one of DR's digital radio stations in Denmark. It launched on 12 September 2011 as the fourth of five new digital-only stations.

== History ==
In November 2010, DR announced it would significantly lower the number of digital radio stations in its line-up from 23 to between 10-12. The new line-up of digital stations were announced in January 2011 with P8 Jazz replacing the former DR Jazz. Unlike DR Jazz which played jazz non-stop, P8 Jazz were to have presenters.

On 1 October 2017 P8 Jazz became available on DAB+ radio when a nationwide switch-over took place.
