= DR P2 =

- Denmark
- Broadcast area: Denmark

Programming
- Language: Danish
- Format: Classical

Ownership
- Owner: DR
- Operator: DR

History
- First air date: 1 October 1951; 74 years ago

Links
- Webcast: Web Stream; HTTP progressive Streams: (Shoutcast, 92 Kbps MP3); (Shoutcast, 192 Kbps MP3); HLS Streams: (192 Kbps AAC)
- Website: www.dr.dk/p2/

DR P2 – in Denmark normally referred to as simply P2 – is a Danish radio station operated by the Danish Broadcasting Corporation. It specializes in classical music, both recorded and in live performance, as well as reporting on and providing discussion of the classical music scene.

Since 1991 P2 has organized a chamber music competition for promising young musicians, held every 2 years.

== History ==
On 1 October 1951 the then Statsradiofonien launched their second radio station, called Program 2. In 1959 Statsradiofonien changed its name to Danmarks Radio, and to DR in 1996.

In 1960 Danmarks Radio started regional programming on P2 in the evenings. The station switched to nationwide stereo output on 1 October 1969 after some regional trials. Classical music was first broadcast on the station in 1980 during the evenings when the regional programming took over the daytime schedule.

DR had in 2001 won the rights to use Denmark's new fourth nationwide FM channel to which the station was moved and re-launched as DR P2 Musik & Kultur on 1 September 2001. The regional programming stayed on the former P2 regional channels and was re-launched as DR P4.

DR subsequently lost the rights to continue the use of the fourth nationwide FM channel from 2011, which meant DR only had room for three of their four FM channels. DR therefore decided that P1 and P2 must share the nationwide FM channel that P1 had been using, starting on 1 November 2011. On the same day DR P2 became DR P2 Klassisk. Both channels continued as two separate channels digitally on DAB and online.

In 2013 DR P2 Klassisk changed name to its current name DR P2.

On 1 October 2017 P2 became available on DAB+ radio when a nationwide switch-over took place.
