= DR P6 Beat =

- Denmark
- Broadcast area: Denmark – Nationally via Digital Audio Broadcasting (DAB)
- Frequency: DAB: MUX1

Programming
- Language: Danish
- Format: Multi-formatted

Ownership
- Owner: DR
- Operator: DR

History
- First air date: 11 April 2011; 14 years ago

Links
- Webcast: Web Stream; HTTP progressive Streams: (Shoutcast, 92 Kbps MP3); (Shoutcast, 192 Kbps MP3); HLS Streams: (192 Kbps AAC)
- Website: www.dr.dk/p6beat

DR P6 Beat is one of DR's digital radio stations in Denmark. It launched on 11 April 2011 as the second of five new digital-only stations.

== History ==
In November 2010, DR announced it would significantly lower the number of digital radio stations in its line-up from 23 to between 10 and 12. The new line-up of digital stations were announced in January 2011 with P6 Beat as a station with focus on alternative music.

On 1 October 2017 P6 Beat became available on DAB+ radio when a nationwide switch-over took place.

== Presenters ==
- Alexander Lembourn
- Anders Bøtter
- Camilla Jane Lea
- Carsten Holm
- Casper Bach Hegstrup
- Henrik Aagaard
- Jacob Hinchely
- Jonas Hansen
- Mikael Simpson
- Rune Hedeman
- Tilde Bang-Hansen

== P6 Beat rocker Koncerthuset ==
Every December since 2012, P6 Beat has hosted a night of concerts at DR Koncerthuset, using all five venues at the same time. Attendees of the event are free to roam around the different venues.
