= DR P5 =

Denmark
- Broadcast area: Denmark – Nationally via Digital Audio Broadcasting (DAB)
- Frequency: DAB: MUX1

Programming
- Format: Multi-formatted

Ownership
- Owner: DR

History
- First air date: 2 November 2009

Links
- Webcast: Web Stream; HTTP progressive Streams: (Shoutcast, 92 Kbps MP3); (Shoutcast, 192 Kbps MP3); HLS Streams: (192 Kbps AAC)
- Website: www.dr.dk/p5

DR P5 is one of DR's digital radio stations in Denmark. It launched on 2 November 2009, replacing the former P4 Danmark. P5 is aimed at people over the age of 60.

== Presenters ==
- Ole Jacobsen
- Charlotte Hagen Striib
- Dennis Johanneson
- Rasmus Scharling Toft
- Gitte Førby
- Søren Hansen
- Rikke Frahm
- Jørgen de Mylius
- Liselotte Krogager
- Ole Tøpholm
- Ivan Gregersen
- Jesper Nyborg
- Charlotte Ostertag
- Britt Berglund
- Anne Dorte Michelsen
- Lonnie Kjer
