= DR P4 =

Denmark
- Broadcast area: Denmark

Programming
- Language: Danish
- Format: Multi-formatted

Ownership
- Owner: DR
- Operator: DR

History
- First air date: 4 April 1960 (original); 1 September 2001 (current)

Links
- Website: www.dr.dk/lyd/p4

DR P4 is the regional radio channel of Denmark's national public broadcasting corporation, DR. The 10 regional stations which make up P4 originate their own local programming and also carry jointly produced nationwide content. P4's programming is a mixture of popular music, traffic announcements, national and regional news.

== History ==
The name "P4" originates from 1973 when it was the name of a radio programme directed towards younger audience and broadcast on Sunday evenings on DR P1. This programme had been broadcast for 24 years when it was closed in 1997.

On 4 April 1960 DR started regional programming on DR P2. At this time six stations were available: Bornholms Radio in Rønne, Midtjyllands Radio in Aarhus, Nordjyllands Radio in Aalborg, Radio Fyn in Odense, Sjællands Radio in Næstved, and Sønderjyllands Radio in Aabenraa.

At the beginning each station broadcast only half an hour of its own programming, each Monday from 19.15. Two years later this was expanded to 45 minutes. From 1967 a 40-minute round-up from all the regions was also broadcast on Tuesdays.

It was the expansion of FM radio, which necessitated the building of a denser network of transmitters to ensure good reception in all parts of the country, which also made regional radio technically possible.

DR had in 2001 won the rights to use Denmark's new fourth nationwide FM channel to which DR P2 was moved on 1 September 2001. The regional programming stayed on the former P2 regional channels and was re-launched as DR P4.

In March 2013 DR P4 became the first of DR's radio channels to be available on DAB+ digital radio. The other stations were available on standard DAB.

== DR P4 Regional stations ==
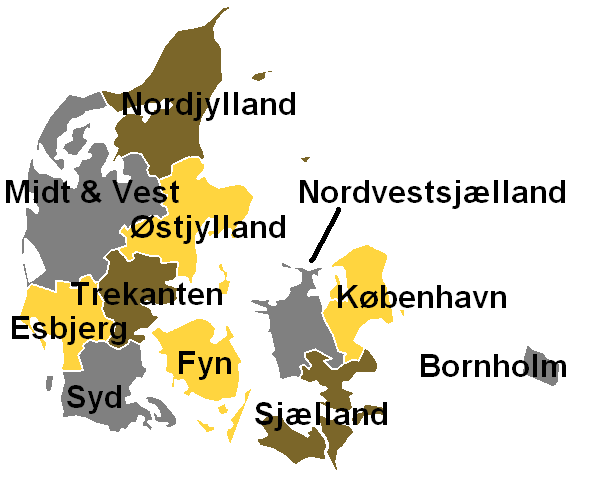
The regions in 2011

=== DR P4 Bornholm ===
Began in 1960 as Bornholms Radio.

=== DR P4 Esbjerg ===
Began broadcasting on 1 January 2007.

=== DR P4 Fyn ===
Began in 1960 as Radio Fyn.

=== DR P4 København ===
Began in 1962 as Københavns Radio.

=== DR P4 Midt & Vest ===
Began in April 1974 as Regionalradioen i Holstebro; was later renamed Radio Midt & Vest.

=== DR P4 Sjælland ===
Formerly DR Regionalen; was expanded following the closure in 2013 of P4 Nordvestsjælland to cover the area formerly covered by the latter station.

=== DR P4 Trekanten ===
Began in 1980 as Kanal 94; was later renamed P4 Trekanten and now covering a smaller area. The Trekanten (triangle) region is the area which includes the three major centres of Fredericia, Kolding, and Vejle as well as the towns of Billund, Haderslev, Middelfart, and Vejen.

=== DR P4 Østjylland ===
Began in 1960 as Østjyllands Radio.
