= DR P1 =

Denmark
- Broadcast area: Denmark

Programming
- Language: Danish

Ownership
- Owner: DR
- Operator: DR

History
- First air date: 23 April 1925; 100 years ago

Links
- Webcast: Web Stream; HTTP progressive Streams: (Shoutcast, 92 Kbps MP3); (Shoutcast, 192 Kbps MP3); HLS Streams: (192 Kbps AAC)
- Website: www.dr.dk/lyd/p1

DR P1 – in Denmark normally referred to as simply P1 – is a Danish radio station operated by the Danish Broadcasting Corporation. P1 has evolved into a pure voice channel with a focus on news, documentaries, political debates, education, general cultural, scientific and social programming.

Since 1 November 2011 P1 has had to share its nationwide FM frequency with P2 since DR lost the rights to continue the use of the fourth nationwide FM channel which P2 had been using. P1 broadcasts on the FM channel during daytime. Both channels continued as two separate channels digitally on DAB and online.

== History ==
The station was established in 1925 with the start of operations of Statsradiofonien. In 1959 Statsradiofonien changed its name to Danmarks Radio, and to DR in 1996.

Since 1931 the station has had its own identifying pause signal and chime called Drømte mig en drøm i nat which has been modernized several times since, most recently by Thomas Blachman in 2010.

In January 2004 P1 started 24-hour broadcasting, whereas earlier it rebroadcast DR P3 programming from midnight until 6 a.m.

On 1 October 2017 P1 became available on DAB+ radio when a nationwide switch-over took place.
