= 2025 Gentofte municipal election =

Municipal election in Denmark

← 2021	18 November 2025	2029 →

All 19 seats to the Gentofte municipal council 10 seats needed for a majority
- Turnout: 42,296 (73.4%) ▲1.9%
	First party	Second party	Third party
	C	V	B
Party	Conservatives	Venstre	Social Liberals
Last election	12 seats, 57.0%	1 seat, 5.7%	2 seats, 10.3%
Seats won	10	3	2
Seat change	▼2	▲2	0
Popular vote	19,802	6,008	4,013
Percentage	47.3%	14.3%	9.6%
Swing	▼9.7%	▲8.7%	▼0.8%
	Fourth party	Fifth party	Sixth party
	F	A	Ø
Party	Green Left	Social Democrats	Red-Green Alliance
Last election	1 seat, 7.0%	2 seats, 8.7%	1 seat, 5.3%
Seats won	1	1	1
Seat change	0	▼1	0
Popular vote	3,428	2,648	2,227
Percentage	8.2%	6.3%	5.3%
Swing	▲1.2%	▼2.4%	▼0.0%
	Seventh party
	I
Party	Liberal Alliance
Last election	0 seats, 2.5%
Seats won	1
Seat change	▲1
Popular vote	1,889
Percentage	4.5%
Swing	▲2.0%
Mayor before election
Michael Fenger
Conservatives
Mayor after election
Michael Fenger
Conservatives

The 2025 Gentofte Municipal election was held on November 18, 2025, to elect the 19 members to sit in the regional council for the Gentofte Municipal council, in the period of 2026 to 2029. Michael Fenger from the Conservatives, would secure re-election.

== Background ==
Following the 2021 election, Michael Fenger from Conservatives became mayor for his first term. The party, has held the mayoral position in the municipality since 1888, and Fenger would run for a second term. Morten Løkkegaard, current MEP from Venstre, currently sits in the council, and would run for re-election as a councillor.

== Electoral system ==
For elections to Danish municipalities, a number varying from 9 to 31 are chosen to be elected to the municipal council. The seats are then allocated using the D'Hondt method and a closed list proportional representation. Gentofte Municipality had 19 seats in 2025.

== Electoral alliances ==
=== Electoral Alliance 1 ===
Party		Political alignment
A	Social Democrats	Centre-left
B	Social Liberals	Centre to Centre-left
M	Moderates	Centre to Centre-right

=== Electoral Alliance 2 ===
Party		Political alignment
C	Conservatives	Centre-right
I	Liberal Alliance	Centre-right to Right-wing
O	Danish People's Party	Right-wing to Far-right
V	Venstre	Centre-right
Æ	Denmark Democrats	Right-wing to Far-right

=== Electoral Alliance 3 ===
Party		Political alignment
F	Green Left	Centre-left to Left-wing
Ø	Red-Green Alliance	Left-wing to Far-Left

== Results by polling station ==
Division	A	B	C	F	I	M	O	U	V	Æ	Ø
Division	%	%	%	%	%	%	%	%	%	%	%
Jægersborg	5.5	8.1	51.3	7.8	5.0	1.7	1.7	0.1	13.9	0.3	4.6
Munkegård	11.5	12.3	38.0	13.3	2.5	1.3	2.2	0.2	9.8	0.5	8.4
Rådhuset (Gentofte)	5.8	8.9	49.8	7.7	4.0	1.2	1.6	0.0	16.5	0.4	4.1
Bakkegård	8.8	13.3	40.9	10.3	3.6	0.8	3.0	0.4	10.0	0.7	8.2
Dyssegård	6.9	12.6	46.7	7.2	3.9	1.2	1.5	0.1	13.7	0.8	5.5
Maglegård	4.8	8.7	50.3	8.0	4.4	1.2	1.8	0.2	15.9	0.5	4.2
Hellerup	6.3	8.7	44.3	8.2	5.6	2.4	2.7	0.1	14.9	0.6	6.2
Ordrup	5.3	7.6	50.3	7.3	3.7	2.1	2.5	0.1	16.2	0.5	4.5
Skovshoved	4.3	8.6	48.5	6.0	6.3	2.8	2.4	0.2	16.6	0.4	3.8
Skovgård	5.1	7.6	50.6	7.0	5.9	1.8	2.3	0.1	14.8	0.5	4.4

== Results ==
Party		Votes	%	+/-	Seats	+/-
Gentofte Municipality
C	Conservatives	19,802	47.29	-9.75	10	-2
V	Venstre	6,008	14.35	+8.66	3	+2
B	Social Liberals	4,013	9.58	-0.75	2	0
F	Green Left	3,428	8.19	+1.19	1	0
A	Social Democrats	2,648	6.32	-2.37	1	-1
Ø	Red-Green Alliance	2,227	5.32	-0.02	1	0
I	Liberal Alliance	1,889	4.51	+2.01	1	+1
O	Danish People's Party	897	2.14	+1.54	0	0
M	Moderates	688	1.64	New	0	New
Æ	Denmark Democrats	216	0.52	New	0	New
U	Alliancen for Børnene, Ungdommen og Fremtiden	58	0.14	New	0	New
Total		41,874	100	N/A	19	N/A
Invalid votes		102	0.18	-0.07		
Blank votes		320	0.56	+0.11		
Turnout		42,296	73.40	+1.90		
Source: valg.dk

== Opinion polls ==
Polling firm	Fieldwork date	Sample size	C	B	A	F	V	Ø	I	O	M	U	Æ	Others	Lead
Epinion	4 Sep - 13 Oct 2025	552	48.4	5.3	7.0	8.8	8.5	8.2	8.0	2.4	2.4	–	0.9	0.0	39.6
2024 european parliament election	9 Jun 2024		16.9	11.0	8.9	14.1	16.8	4.7	12.1	3.6	8.4	–	1.4	–	0.1
2022 general election	1 Nov 2022		14.6	6.7	12.7	6.1	16.8	4.0	14.4	2.0	14.4	–	1.7	–	2.2
2021 regional election	16 Nov 2021		57.3	9.6	8.2	5.7	6.2	5.6	2.1	0.8	–	–	–	–	47.7
2021 municipal election	16 Nov 2021		57.0 (12)	10.3 (2)	8.7 (2)	7.0 (1)	5.7 (1)	5.3 (1)	2.5 (0)	0.6 (0)	–	–	–	–	46.7
