= List of educational institutions in Gentofte Municipality =

This list of educational institutions in Gentofte Municipality is a list of educational institutions in Gentofte Municipality, Greater Copenhagen, Denmark. It includes primary, secondary and higher educational institutions.

== Secondary education ==
- Aurehøj Gymnasium
- Gammel Hellerup Gymnasium
- Ordrup Gymnasium
- Øregård Gymnasium

== Primary education ==
Name	Image	Location	Coordinates	Founded	No. of pupils	Ref
Bakkegårdsskolen		Skolebakken 20, 2820 Gentofte		1936	745	
Dyssegårdsskolen		Dyssegårdsvej 26, 2900 Hellerup		1932	730	
Gentofte Skole		Baunegårdsvej 33, 2820 Gentofte				
Hellerup Skole		Dessaus Blvd. 10, 2900 Hellerup				
Maglegårdsskolen		Maglegård Skolevej 1, 2900 Hellerup				
Munkegårdsskolen		Vangedevej 178, 2870 Dyssegård		1857		
Ordrup Skole		Grønnevænge 16, 2920 Charlottenlund				
Skovgårdsskolen		Skovgårdsvej 56, 2920 Charlottenlund				
Søgårdsskolen		C L Ibsens Vej 3, 2820 Gentofte				
Tjørnegårdsskolen						

=== Private and charter schools ===
Name	Image	Location	Coordinates	Founded	No. of pupils	Ref
Bernadotteskolen			Hellerupvej 11, 2900 Hellerup			
Busses Skole						
Kildegård Privatskole						
Rygaards International School				1909	970	
Vidar Skolen						

== See also ==
- List of educational institutions in Lyngby-Taarbæk Municipality
