= 2021 Gentofte municipal election =

| ← 2017 | 16 November 2021 | 2025 → |

All 19 seats to the Gentofte Municipal Council 10 seats needed for a majority
- Turnout: 40,200 (71.5%) ▼0.1pp
| | First party | Second party | Third party |
|---|---|---|---|
| | C | B | A |
| Party | Conservatives | Social Liberals | Social Democrats |
| Last election | 13 seats, 58,1% | 1 seat, 7.7% | 2 seats, 10.8% |
| Seats won | 12 | 2 | 2 |
| Seat change | ▼1 | ▲1 | 0 |
| Popular vote | 22,700 | 4,114 | 3,461 |
| Percentage | 57.0% | 10.3% | 8.7% |
| Swing | ▼1.1% | ▲2.6% | ▼2.1% |
| | Fourth party | Fifth party | Sixth party |
| | F | V | Ø |
| Party | Green Left | Venstre | Red–Green Alliance |
| Last election | 1 seat, 3.0% | 1 seat, 6.6% | 1 seat, 5.3% |
| Seats won | 1 | 1 | 1 |
| Seat change | 0 | 0 | 0 |
| Popular vote | 2,783 | 2,263 | 2,125 |
| Percentage | 7.0% | 5.7% | 5.3% |
| Swing | ▲4% | ▼0.9% | 0.0% |
Mayor before election
Michael Fenger (Note: Hans Toft became mayor after the 2017 election, however in January 2021 Michael Fenger took over)
Conservatives
Mayor after election
Michael Fenger
Conservatives

In 1888, (Note: Højre was the party who held the position from 1888 to 1909, but became a part of the Conservatives in 1915) the Conservatives won the mayor's position in the municipality for the first time. Since then, the Conservatives had held it. In 2017 they won their 33rd consecutive term, and Hans Toft his 7th term. However, he would not stand in this election.

Despite a new candidate from the Conservatives, they would still win a comfortable absolute majority. They lost 1 seat, but still won 12 of the 19 seats (63.2%). It would be the municipality where they won the highest % of votes, and also the third highest vote share for a party in the 2017 Danish local elections. With 12 seats, Michael Fenger, the new Conservative candidate, was set to become the mayor.

== Electoral system ==
For elections to Danish municipalities, a number varying from 9 to 31 are chosen to be elected to the municipal council. The seats are then allocated using the D'Hondt method and a closed list proportional representation. Gentofte Municipality had 19 seats in 2021

Unlike in Danish General Elections, in elections to municipal councils, electoral alliances are allowed.

== Electoral alliances ==
=== Electoral Alliance 1 ===
| Party | | Political alignment |
|---|---|---|
| B | Social Liberals | Centre to Centre-left |
| I | Liberal Alliance | Centre-right to Right-wing |
| V | Venstre | Centre-right |

=== Electoral Alliance 2 ===
| Party | | Political alignment |
|---|---|---|
| A | Social Democrats | Centre-left |
| F | Green Left | Centre-left to Left-wing |

=== Electoral Alliance 3 ===
| Party | | Political alignment |
|---|---|---|
| C | Conservatives | Centre-right |
| D | New Right | Right-wing to Far-right |
| K | Christian Democrats | Centre to Centre-right |
| O | Danish People's Party | Right-wing to Far-right |

== Results by polling station ==
| Division | A | B | C | D | F | I | K | O | V | Æ | Ø |
| Division | % | % | % | % | % | % | % | % | % | % | % |
|---|---|---|---|---|---|---|---|---|---|---|---|
| Jægersborg | 7.4 | 8.6 | 60.3 | 2.0 | 6.5 | 2.6 | 0.3 | 0.6 | 6.3 | 0.4 | 5.1 |
| Munkegård | 17.3 | 10.5 | 44.3 | 2.2 | 10.6 | 1.7 | 0.5 | 0.9 | 4.0 | 0.3 | 7.7 |
| Rådhuset | 7.5 | 11.4 | 58.8 | 2.4 | 7.1 | 2.9 | 0.3 | 0.5 | 5.0 | 0.2 | 4.0 |
| Bakkegård | 14.7 | 12.0 | 48.3 | 2.5 | 7.6 | 1.6 | 0.4 | 0.9 | 5.3 | 0.7 | 6.1 |
| Ordrup | 8.2 | 9.1 | 59.7 | 2.4 | 5.7 | 2.2 | 0.2 | 0.5 | 6.2 | 0.5 | 5.1 |
| Hellerup | 7.6 | 10.4 | 55.3 | 2.4 | 7.5 | 2.7 | 0.5 | 0.6 | 6.2 | 0.3 | 6.6 |
| Maglegård | 6.0 | 12.0 | 59.3 | 2.0 | 7.1 | 2.8 | 0.1 | 0.4 | 5.5 | 0.2 | 4.6 |
| Dyssegård | 8.3 | 11.7 | 56.9 | 1.9 | 8.0 | 1.9 | 0.1 | 0.7 | 4.9 | 0.2 | 5.4 |
| Skovshoved | 5.5 | 9.3 | 63.8 | 2.1 | 4.5 | 3.2 | 0.3 | 0.5 | 6.2 | 0.2 | 4.4 |
| Skovgård | 6.7 | 8.3 | 61.3 | 2.2 | 5.8 | 3.0 | 0.2 | 0.6 | 7.0 | 0.3 | 4.7 |

== Results ==
| Party | | Votes | % | +/- | Seats | +/- |
Gentofte Municipality
| C | Conservatives | 22,700 | 57.04 | -1.10 | 12 | -1 |
| B | Social Liberals | 4,114 | 10.34 | +2.62 | 2 | +1 |
| A | Social Democrats | 3,461 | 8.70 | -2.07 | 2 | 0 |
| F | Green Left | 2,783 | 6.99 | +3.95 | 1 | 0 |
| V | Venstre | 2,263 | 5.69 | -0.87 | 1 | 0 |
| Ø | Red-Green Alliance | 2,125 | 5.34 | +0.03 | 1 | 0 |
| I | Liberal Alliance | 996 | 2.50 | +0.63 | 0 | 0 |
| D | New Right | 873 | 2.19 | +0.73 | 0 | 0 |
| O | Danish People's Party | 241 | 0.61 | -1.40 | 0 | 0 |
| Æ | Freedom List | 128 | 0.32 | New | 0 | New |
| K | Christian Democrats | 115 | 0.29 | +0.08 | 0 | 0 |
| Total | | 39,799 | 100 | N/A | 19 | N/A |
| Invalid votes | | 137 | 0.24 | +0.08 | | |
| Blank votes | | 264 | 0.47 | -0.06 | | |
| Turnout | | 40,200 | 71.49 | -0.15 | | |
Source: valg.dk
