= Jacob Gils =

Danish contemporary art photographer

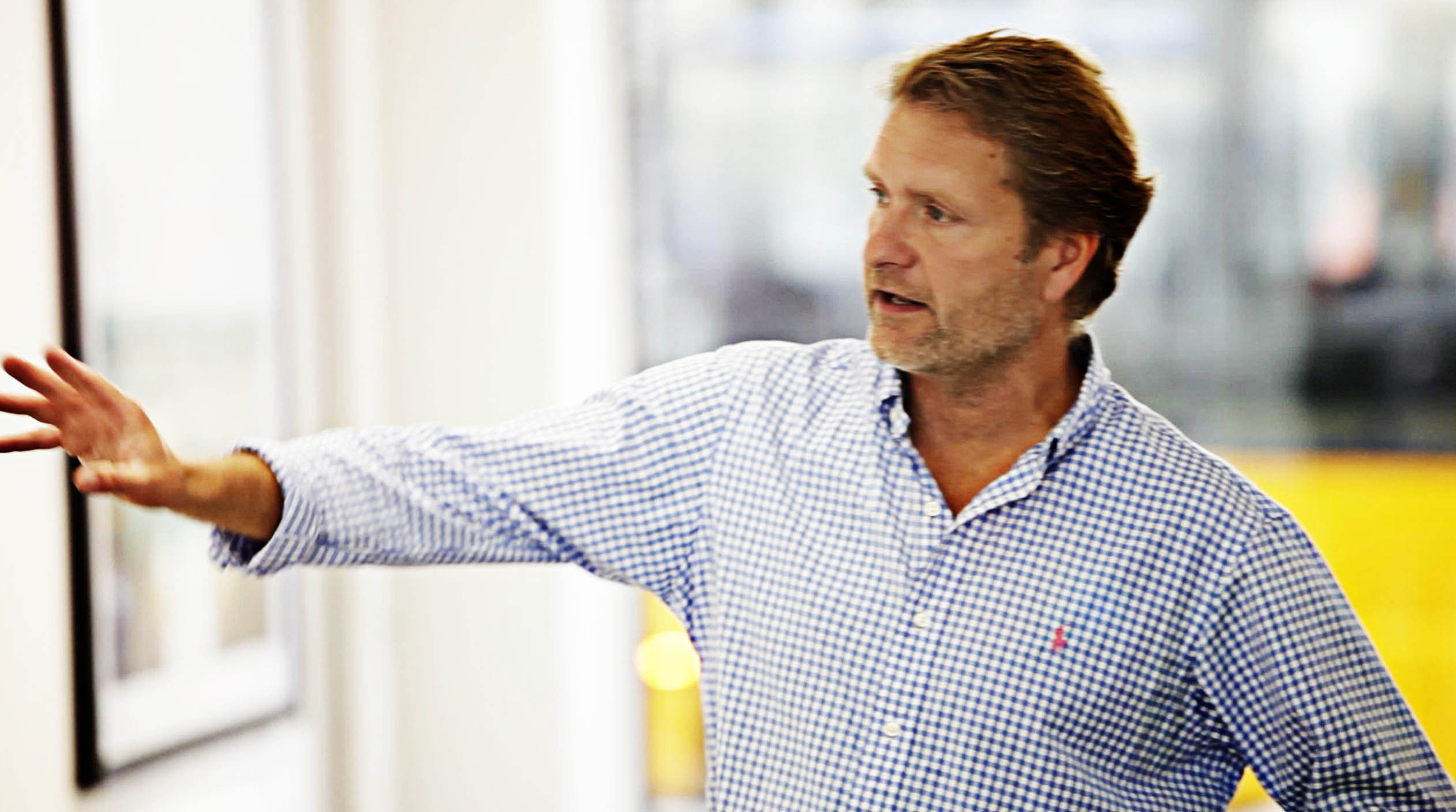
- Education: The Copenhagen School of Photography
- Occupation: Artist
- Parent(s): Merete Hansen and Ove Gils
- Website: jacobgils.com

Jacob Gils is a Danish contemporary art photographer known for his work in a multiple exposure technique called "Movement". His work has been shown in numerous exhibitions, art fairs and museums around the world.

== Early life ==
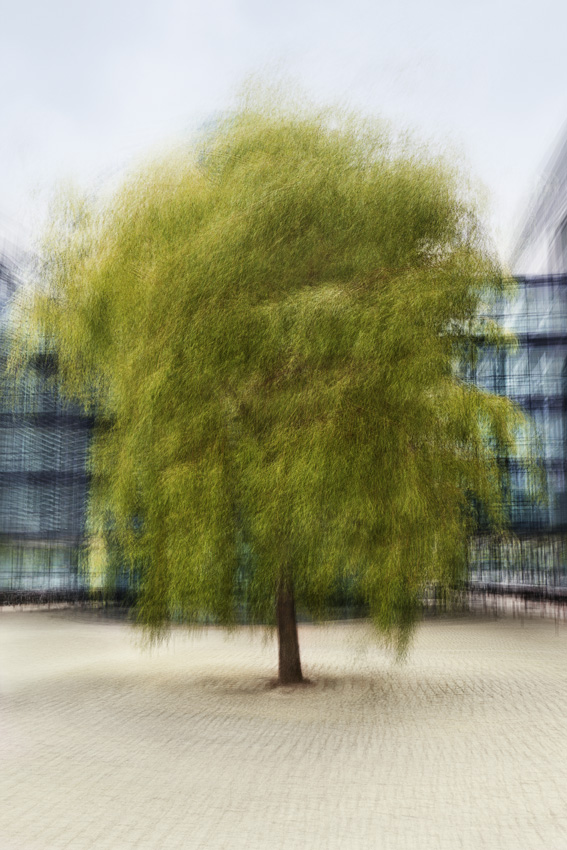
Movement I serie

Jacob Gils was born in Gentofte, Denmark in an artist family. His mother is the painter Merete Hansen, and his father was the painter Ove Gils.

Jacob Gils graduated from the Copenhagen School of Photography in 1989, where he assisted the Danish photographer Leif Schiller. In his early career he worked as a commercial photographer and established the prestigious photo studio Gils Fotografi. In 2001 he transitioned to a fine art practice and started to experiment with different techniques and expressions of photography.

== Collaborations ==
Ballet Folklórico de México

In 2024, he collaborated with the Ballet Folklórico de México Amalia Hernández to produce the series Spirits of Mexico, a multidisciplinary project that merges contemporary visual art with traditional Mexican dance. The series explores the intersection of movement, color, and national identity by portraying dancers from the Ballet Folklórico in emblematic locations across Mexico, such as historic plazas, colonial architecture, and natural landscapes. Through this collaboration, the artist seeks to reinterpret Mexican cultural heritage from a modern perspective, blending his distinctive artistic techniques with the vibrant aesthetics and symbolism of folkloric performance.

== Awards ==
- 2024 Zona Maco ZONA Maco art fair and Erarta foundation "Highlight of the Show"
- 2015 Px3 Prix de la photographie Paris in the category "Fine Art Nudes"
- 2012 Px3 Prix de la photographie Paris in the category "Fine Art Altered Images"

== Work ==
=== Movement ===
Gils' Movement series started as an experiment and eventually became a creative work. Myriam Simons, from le revenue claims that his photography is something new and full of creativity because he paints with his camera. Fredrik Haren, "The Creativity Explorer", called this for his experience exploring about human creativity and writer about the subject, talked about the balance between Gils' "curious research mode" and the "focused execution mode".

=== Limit to your love ===
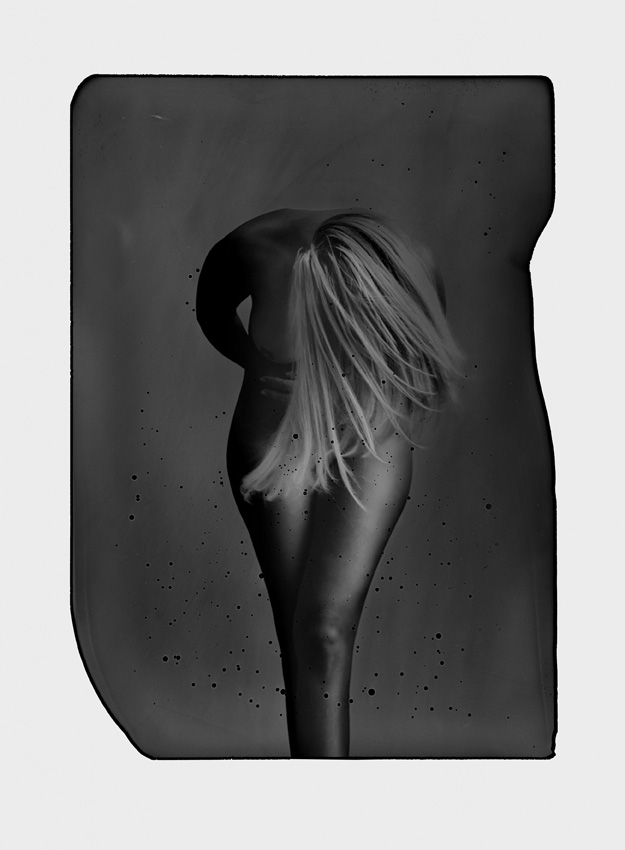
Limit to Your Love

The series Limit to your Love is Gils' nude experiment with a Polaroid camera. He has won two awards for this series. Virginie Lorient from Bettina Von Arnim's Gallery asserts that the transfers of colours of this technique may vary, but Gils does not modify the natural colours of the picture.

=== Transfer ===
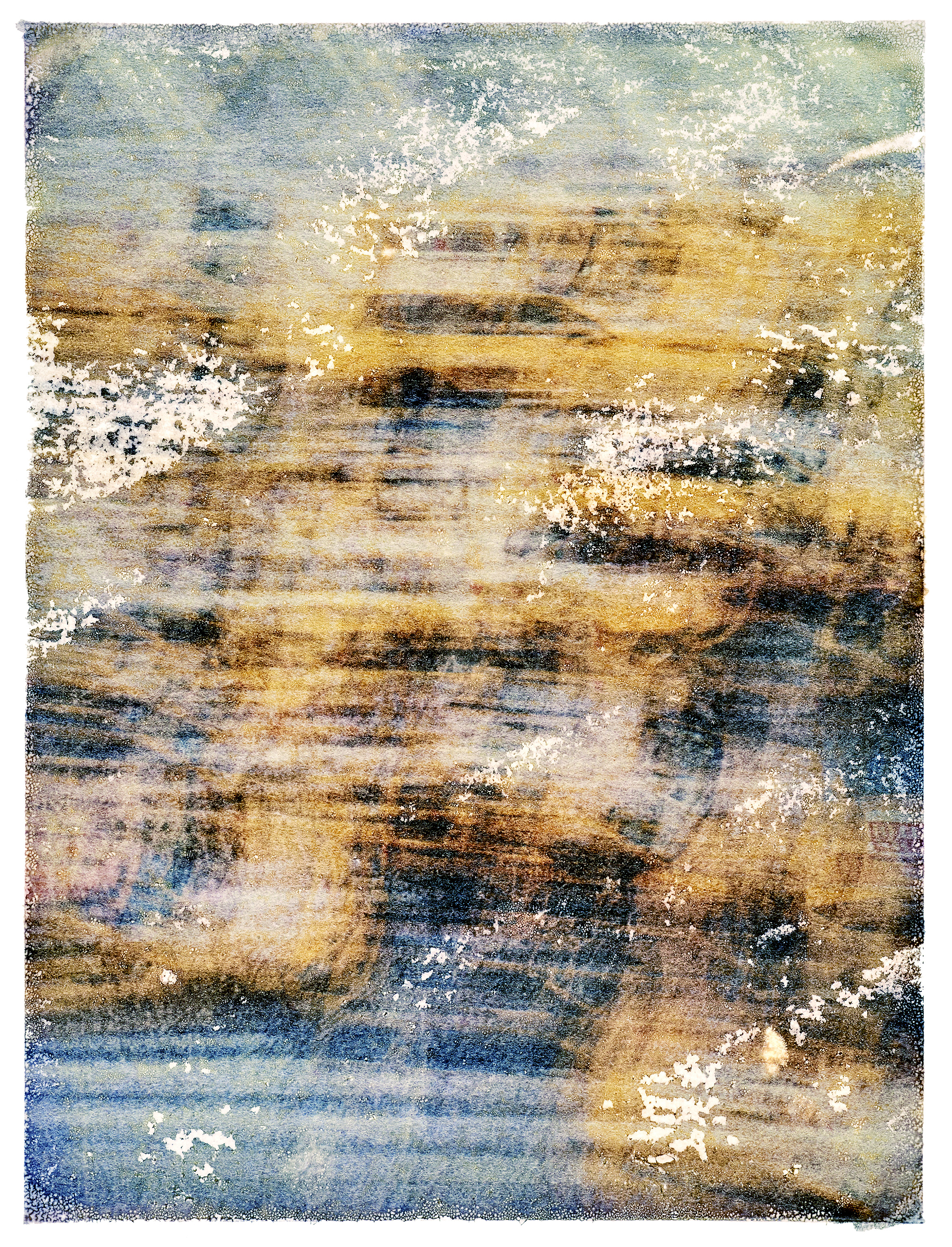
Transfer serie

Transfer series are polaroids transferred onto watercolour paper. Through this technique a particularly atmospheric and dreamy mood arises. Upon closer inspection, however, the eye begins to decode that in these works there are real places depicted, all with their special characteristics.

== Articles ==
- Le Revenu
- The art couch.
- Switch Magazine
- Gente di Fotografia
- Gente di Fotografia
- Gente di Fotografia
- The eye of photography
- Bo Bedre. Erick Rimmer
- Interview to The creativity Explorer. Fredrik Hansen
- The Portugal News, Exhibition at In The Pink.
- Grazia, El artista danés Jacob Gils, fotografía al Ballet Folklórico de México de Amalia Hernández | Grazia México y Latinoamérica

== Permanent exhibitions ==
- Stockholm: Fotografiska Museum of Photography
- Norway: The National Museum of Photography Oslo
- Bogotá: Museum of Modern Art MAMBO
- Copenhagen: The Danish National Museum of Photography
- China: Nanjing Institute of Visual Arts
- Beijing: Danish Cultural Institute in Beijing
- Boston: Boston Properties offices
- Copenhagen: LEGO A/S
- Copenhagen: TRH Crown Prince Frederik and Crown Princess Mary Palace
- Milan: Loro Piana Collection
- Copenhagen: Maersk A/S
- Shanghai: Thomas Shao Collection
