= Peter Fenger =

Peter Fenger may refer to:

- Peter Fenger (merchant) (1719–1774), Danish merchant and slave trader
- Peter Michael Fenger (born 1962), Danish former handball player and politician
