= Fæstningskanalen =

Canal in Lyngby-Taarbæk Municipality, Denmark

Coordinates: 55.7724°N 12.4963°E

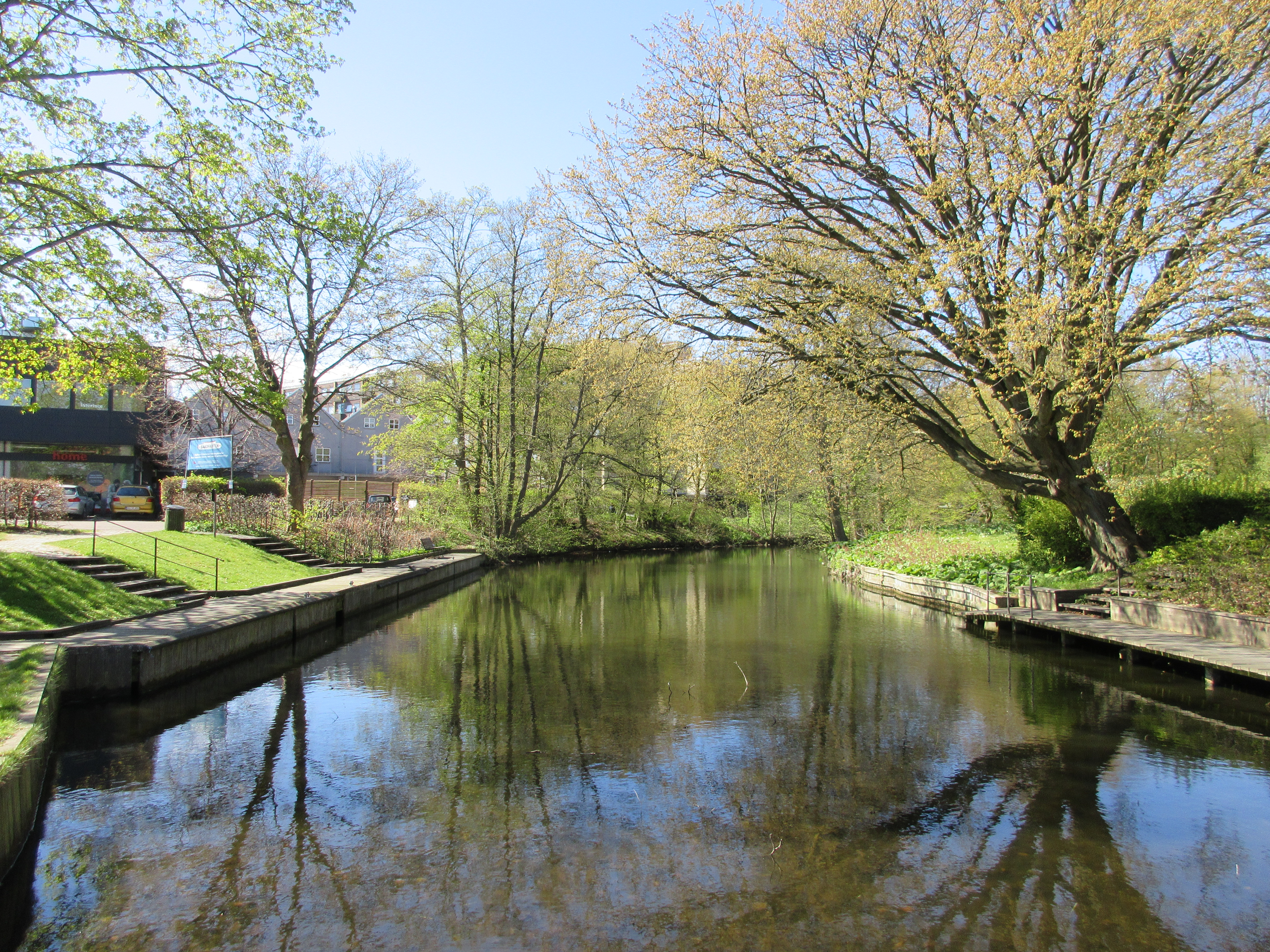
Fæstningskanalen at Lyngby Hovedgade

Fæstningskanalen (literally "The Fortification Canal") is a canal in central Kongens Lyngby, Lyngby-Taarbæk Municipality, Copenhagen, Denmark. Created in the 1880s as part of the new fortification ring around the Danish capital, it runs from Lyngby Lake in the west to Lyngby Hovedgade in the east. From there it originally continued to Ermelunden in Jægersborg Dyrehave, but this last leg of the canal is no longer filled with water. The project also included a more upstream straightening of the section of Mølleåen that connects Furesø in the west to the west side of Lyngby Lake in the east. The canal complemented the West Rampart (Vestvolden) and a series of coastal fortresses which were built at the same time. In the event of an enemy invasion, a dam at each end of the canal, one at Frederiksdal and one at Ermelunden, would be opened, and the natural drainage of Lyngby Lake would be blocked, leading to the flooding of an extensive area of land along Hvidørebækken all the way out to the Øresund coast. Water would also be led through Gentofte Lake to Utterslev Mose, leading to further floodings. Together with the moat in front of the West Rampart, this would create a complete water barrier around the Danish capital.

== History ==
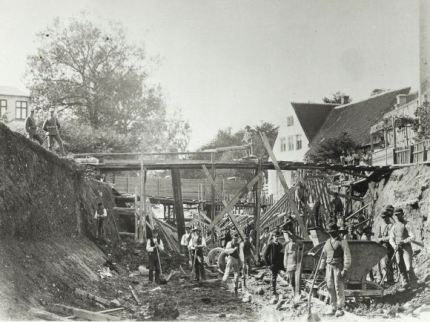
Fæstningskanalen under construction

Fæstningskanalen was dug in 1887–88. A series of bridges were constructed by the engineering troops. The first was called Kirkegårdsbroen and connected Lyngby Church with Lyngby Assistens Cemetery. It remained intact until the 1920s, when the lower part of the canal was filled.

== Restoration project ==
In January 2010, Lyngby-Taarbæk's utility company, Lyngby Forsyning, presented plans to partly restore the covered section of the canal as part of a scheme to protect central Kongens Lyngby against flooding under heavy rain. On the other side of Kanalvej, a road that runs next to the canal, Danica Pension is building a 40,000-square-metre (430,000 sq ft) development, designed by Henning Larsen Architects, that includes the Microsoft Development Center Copenhagen.

== Recreational use ==
Baadfarten, the boat service on Lyngby Lake and Lake Bagsværd is based at Fæstningskanalen. It is located next to the bridge between Rustenborgvej and Sorgenfrivej. Canoe rental is also available.

== Image gallery ==
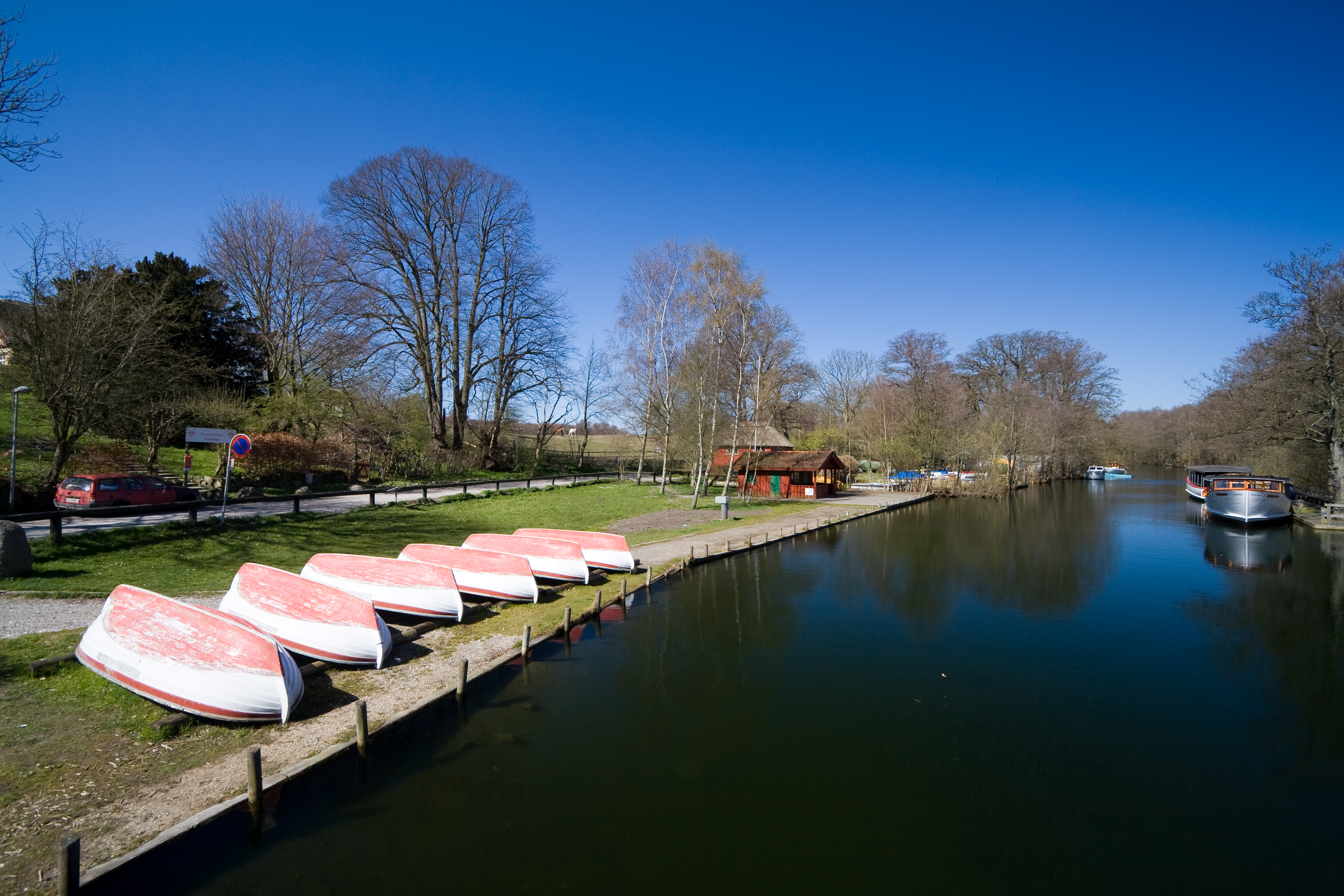
The Mølleåen at Frederiksdal

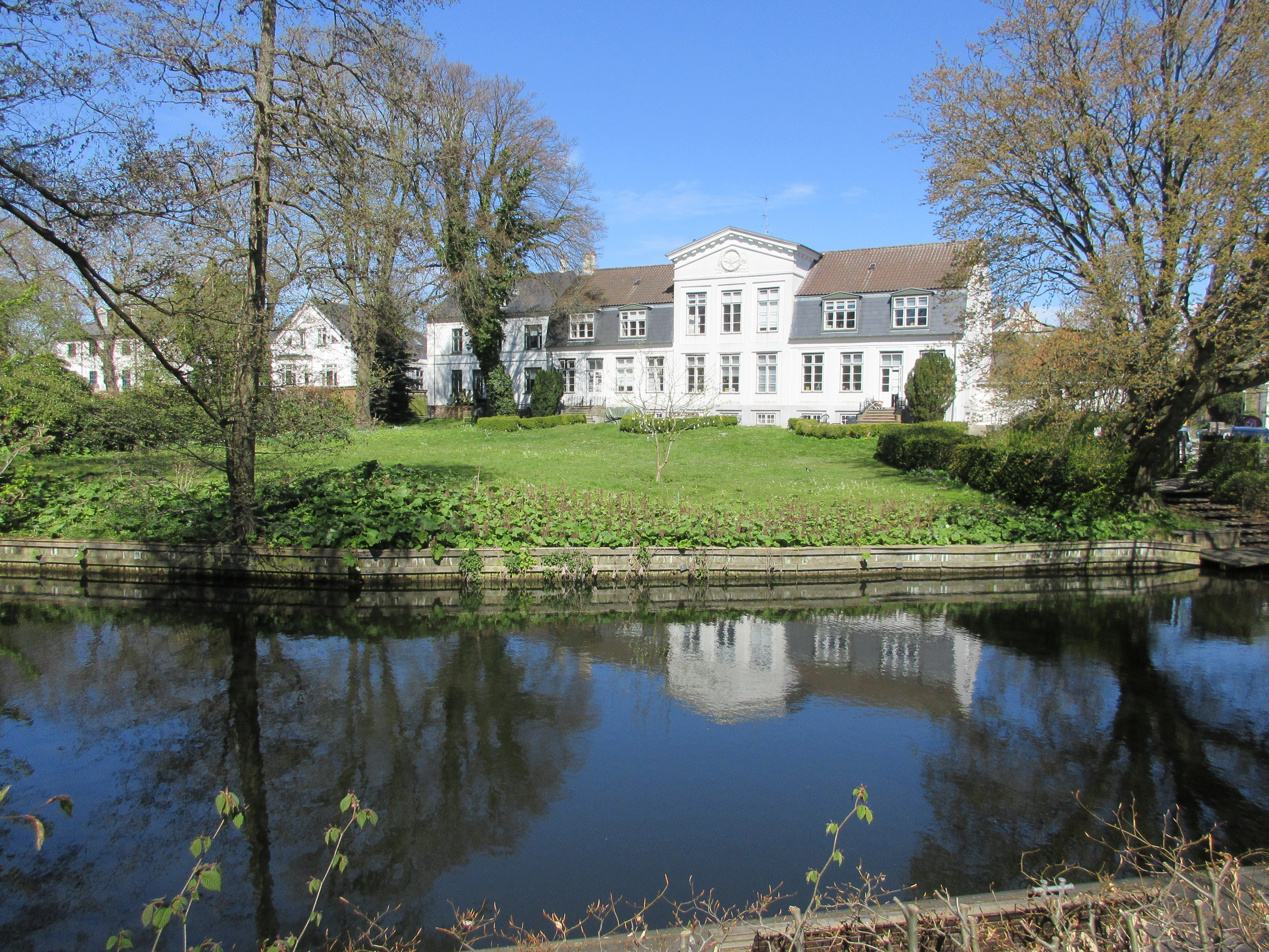
Fæstningskanalen with Rustenborgvej 1

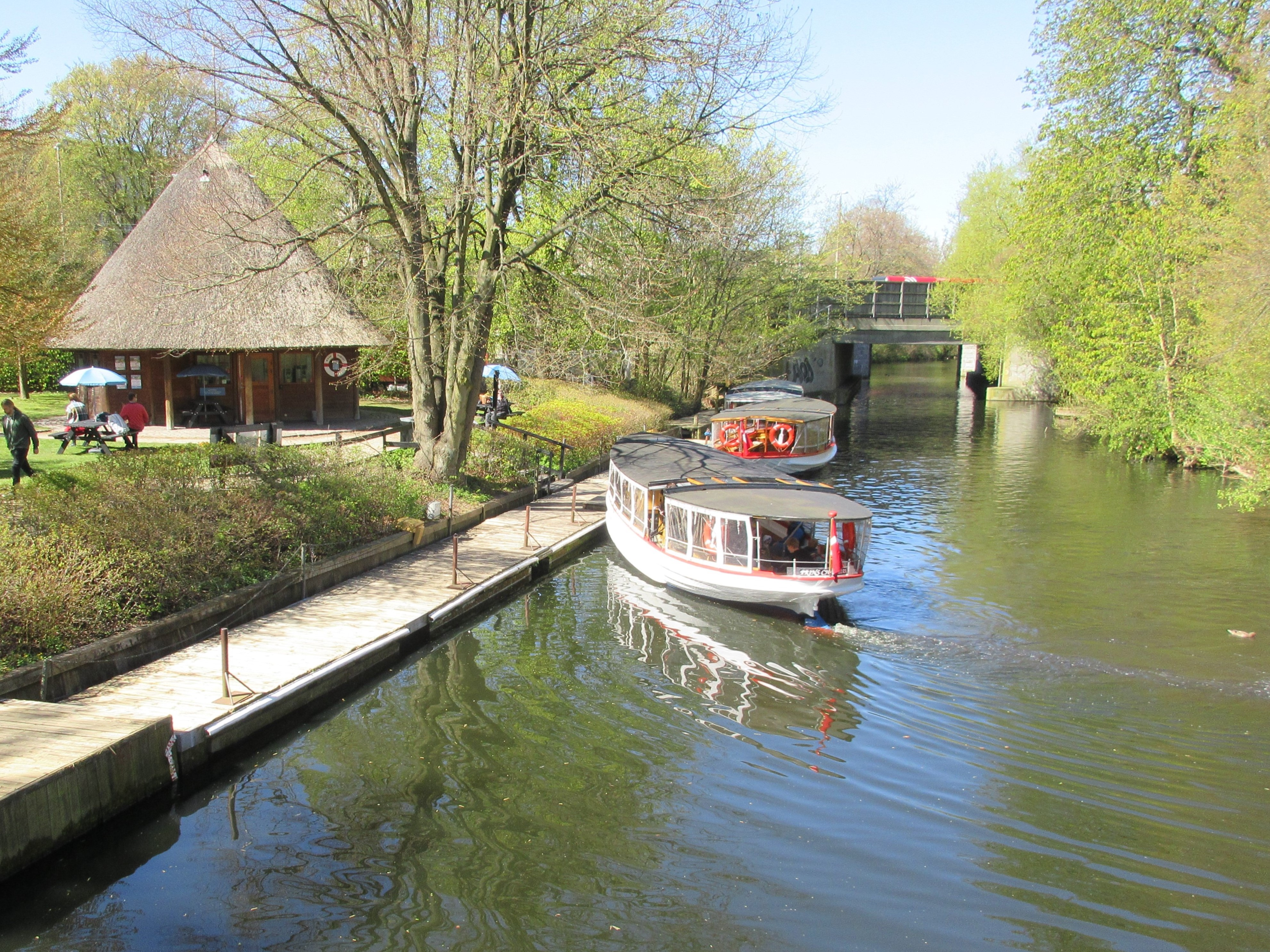
The boat service at Rustenborgvej
