= Bakkegårdsskolen =

Bakkegård School
- Bakkegårdsskolen
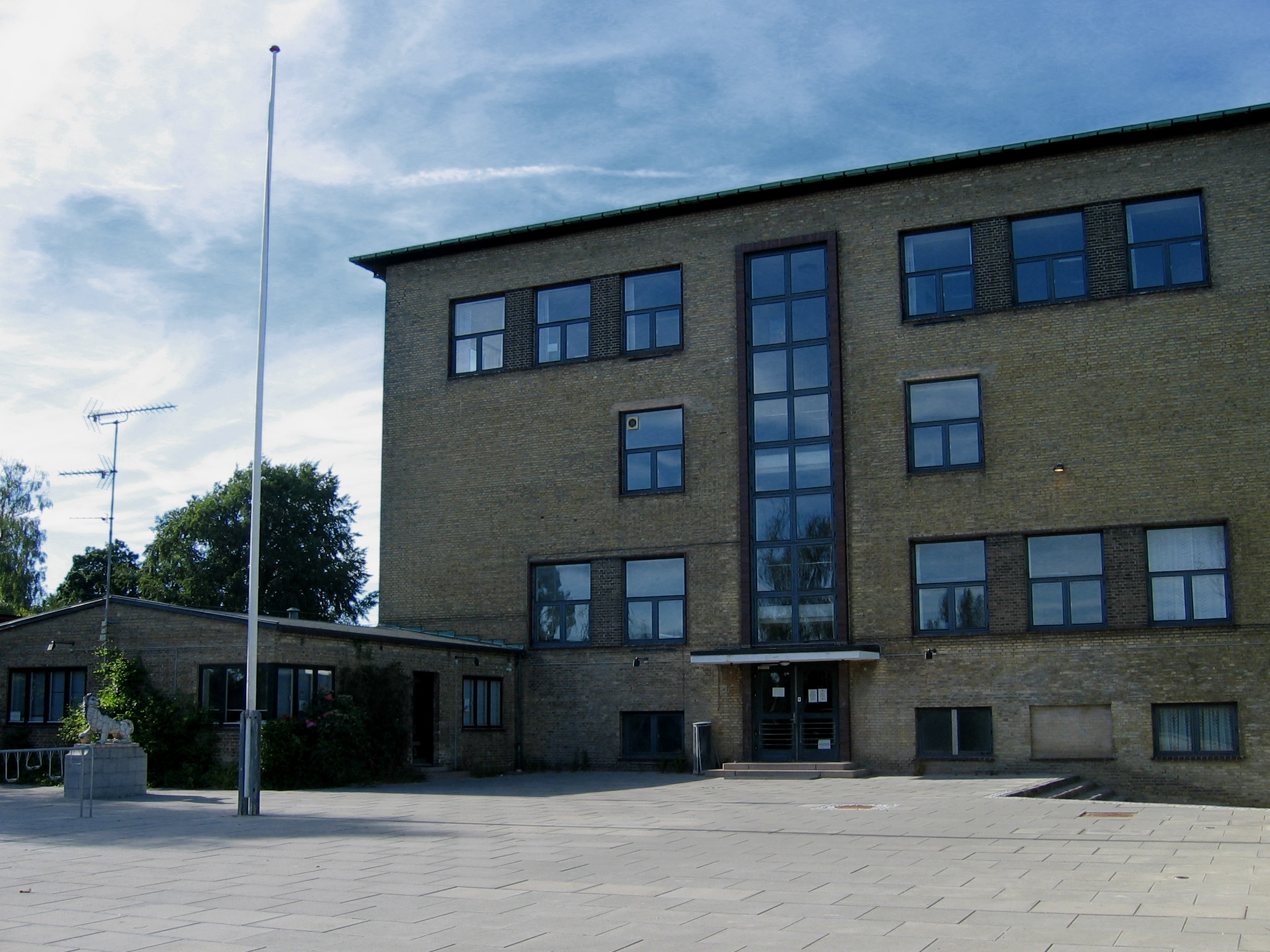

Location
- Skolebakken 20, 2820 Gentofte
- Coordinates: 55.7466°N 12.5254°E

Information
- School type: Elementary Public
- Established: 1936; 90 years ago
- Principal: Rikke Michan
- Grades: Reception - Year 10
- Gender: Co-ed
- Age: 6 to 16
- Enrolment: 745 (2016)
- Language: Danish
- Website: Website

Bakkegårdsskolen is a public primary school in the Vangede district of Gentofte Municipality, Greater Copenhagen, Denmark.

== History ==
The school takes its name after Bakkegården, a farm that moved out of the village of Vangede as a result of Bernstorff's agricultural reforms in 1766. Its land was divided between Søndre Bakkegård and Nordre Bakkegård in 1783. Nordre Bakkegård was demolished in 1935 to make room for new soccer fields. Tjørnegårdsskolen from 1924 had become too small and the municipality therefore planned a new school in the middle of the new neighborhood which was under development at Bakkevejene. The school was designed by the architect Frederik Wagner. The school had an astronomical observatory on the roof and an area with school gardens located to the west of the building. Several classes were transferred from Tjørnegårdsskolen and the new school was therefore full to capacity after just a few years. In the 1940s and 1950s, the number of pupils frequently exceeded 800. A school kitchen, library and medical and dental clinics were later added. The number of pupils declined to less than 400 after 1975 but the number began to rise again after Mosegårdsskolen was closed.

== Architecture ==
The school is a Functionalist aula school. It was altered in 2004-2006 to meet modern requirements. A new underground sports hall was constructed under the schoolyard. The size of the school was increased from 6,500 square metres to almost 10,000 square metres.

== Artworks ==
At the main entrance is a sculpture of a lion. It was created by Henrik Stercke.

== Notable pupils ==
- Dan Turèll
- Benny Andersen

== See also ==
- Dyssegårdsskolen
