= Helen Schou =

Danish sculptor

- Born: Helen Rée; 19 April 1905; Frederiksberg, Denmark
- Died: 27 March 2006 (aged 100); Holmegårdsparken, Charlottenlund, Denmark
- Occupations: artist, sculptor
- Years active: 1927–1988

Helen Schou (19 April 1905 – 27 March 2006) was a Danish sculptor most known for her works of horses. Her two most-known commissions are the equestrian statue of King Christian IX commissioned for the Aarhus Cathedral and the Jutland Stallion commissioned by the City of Randers. She was honored as a Knight of the Order of the Dannebrog in 1965 and elevated to a Knight 1st Class in 1974.

== Early life ==
Helen Rée was born on 19 April 1905 in Frederiksberg, Denmark to Dagmar (née Albeck) and Ivar Müller Rée, a stockbroker. She knew from an early age that she wanted to become an artist, though her early works were drawings and paintings. She was also an avid horsewoman, participating in competitions and raising her own horses. As the youngest child in a well-to-do Copenhagen family, her parents indulged her wishes, though her father was apprehensive about her desire to sculpt rather than paint.

At the age of 18, Rée began studying with Anne Marie Carl-Nielsen. At the time, Carl-Nielsen was working on her statue of Christian IX astride a horse for the Palace Riding Arena of Christiansborg, which allowed Rée to gain insight in creating a monument. In 1926, Rée married Holger Høiriis Schou, the director of C. Schous Fabrikker, a major soap manufacturer and distributor. At the end of the following year, Schou completed her studies with Carl-Nielsen and debuted at the Charlottenborg Spring Exhibition. In 1929, she enrolled in the Royal Danish Academy of Fine Arts, under the tutelage of Einar Utzon-Frank. In 1932, she left the Academy and continued her studies abroad, in such places as Florence, Paris, and Rome. In addition, to augment her knowledge of horses and their anatomy, she took dissection courses at the Royal Veterinary and Agricultural University.

== Career ==
From the late 1920s, Schou received various commissions for work, though at times she faced discrimination from officials who felt that as a woman she was not up for monumental works, or because of her societal status felt she did not need the work. She exhibited at the Salon in Paris from 1929 to 1934. She also participated annually in the Spring Exhibition through the 1950s. Though most known for her equine statues, Schou was equally interested in and produced statues of people. Many of these portraits, of subjects such as artist Agnes Lunn (1933), ballet master Hans Beck (da) (1937), and actor Holger Gabrielsen (1939), are in bronze or marble and are in either bust or relief. Some of her noted pieces include: Hest overfaldes af Slange (Horse Attacked by Snake, 1935) in Randers; Styrtende Amazone (Stirring Amazone, (1938) in the collection of the National Museum of Art, Architecture and Design in Oslo; Morgengry (1939) for the people's park at Lyngby Lake; Hest med føl (Horse with foal, 1940) installed and later moved in 1980 to Øregård Park (da) in Hellerup; a bust of her husband Holger Høiriis Schou (1941); and Moder med Barn (Mother with Child, 1943) at the park of Bellevue Beach.

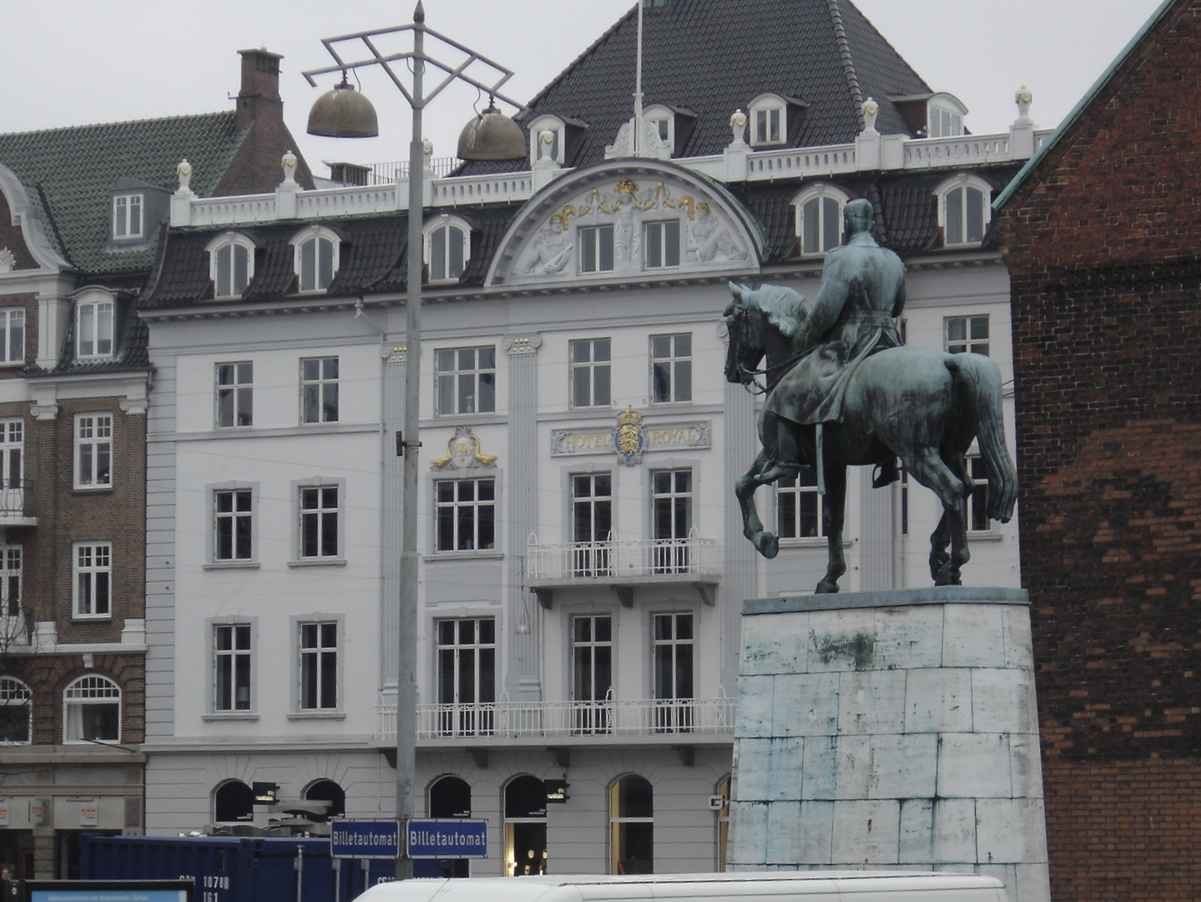
equestrian statue of Christian X, Aarhus

Schou's two major works were the equestrian statue of King Christian X and Jutland Stallion. She worked on the riding figure in Aarhus for twelve years, beginning the work in 1944 to create a city landmark which is a balance between movement and stationary forms, as well as gives equal prominence to horse and rider. The commissioned work was installed in front of the Aarhus Cathedral in 1955. The Jutland Stallion stands five-meters high and spans six-meters in length. The subject is a Jutland workhorse, which emphasizes its strength and vitality through the defined shapes of its muscles. It was commissioned by the City of Randers in 1959 and installed ten years later. In the 1970s, Schou visited Uganda and the trip inspired her commission of mating rituals for the Tranehaven Treatment Center in Charlottenlund, which was installed in 1988.

Between 1937 and 1938, Schou served as a member of the board of the Danish Sculpture Society and repeated the service between 1941 and 1942. In 1956, she was the recipient of the Agnes Lunn Prize. She was a member of the Royal Danish Academy of Fine Arts from 1959 to 1978, chairing the professional sculptor committees between 1967 and 1968. In 1965, Schou was honored as a Knight of the Order of the Dannebrog and elevated to a Knight 1st Class in 1974. As art tastes changed, Schou's realism was often unappreciated in the 1960s and 1970s. In 1995, a retrospective exhibition of her works was held by the Den Frie Udstilling.

== Death and legacy ==
Schou died on 27 March 2006 at her home in Holmegårdsparken, Charlottenlund, Denmark. She was the mother of three children: Eva (1927), Dorrit (1937) and Christian (1940). In addition to her public monuments and works held in Oslo, she has works held by the Rigshospitalet and Theatre Museum in the Court Theatre.
