= List of educational institutions in Lyngby-Taarbæk Municipality =

This list of educational institutions in Lyngby-Taarbæk Municipality is a list of educational institutions in Lyngby-Taarbæk Municipality, Greater Copenhagen, Denmark. It includes primary, secondary and higher educational institutions.

== Higher education ==
- Technical University of Denmark
- Maskinmesterskolen i København

== Secondary education ==
- Lyngby Gymnasium
- Virum Gymnasium

== Primary education ==
=== Public schools ===
Name	Image	Location	Coordinates	Founded	No. of pupils	Ref
Engelsborgskolen		Engelsborgvej 66, 2800 Kongens Lyngby	55°45′57.16″N 12°29′29.45″E	1909	1,000	
Fuglsanggårdsskolen		Askevænget 10; 2830 Virum				
Hummeltofteskolen		Grønnevej 218, 2830 Virum				
Kongevejens Skole		Kongsvænget 10, 2830 Virum				
Lindegårdsskolen		Lyngbygårdsvej 37, 2800 Kongens Lyngby		1933		
Munkegårdsskolen		Nøjsomhedsvej 1–11, 2800 Kongens Lyngby		1857		
Sorgenfriskolen		Kongevejen 55, 2800 Kongens Lyngby				
Trongårdsskolen		Trongårdsvej 50, 2800 Kongens Lyngby				
Taarbæk Skole		Taarbæk Strandvej 96, 2930 Klampenborg				
Virum Skole		Skolebakken 9, 2830 Virum				

=== Private and charter schools ===
Name	Image	Location	Coordinates	Founded	No. of pupils	Ref
Lyngby Private Skole		Lyngby Hovedgade 56, 2800 Kongens Lyngby				
Sankt Knud Lavard Skole		Toftebæksvej 30, 2800 Kongens Lyngby			1954	
