= Lyngby Lake =

Lake in Copenhagen, Denmark

Lyngby Sø
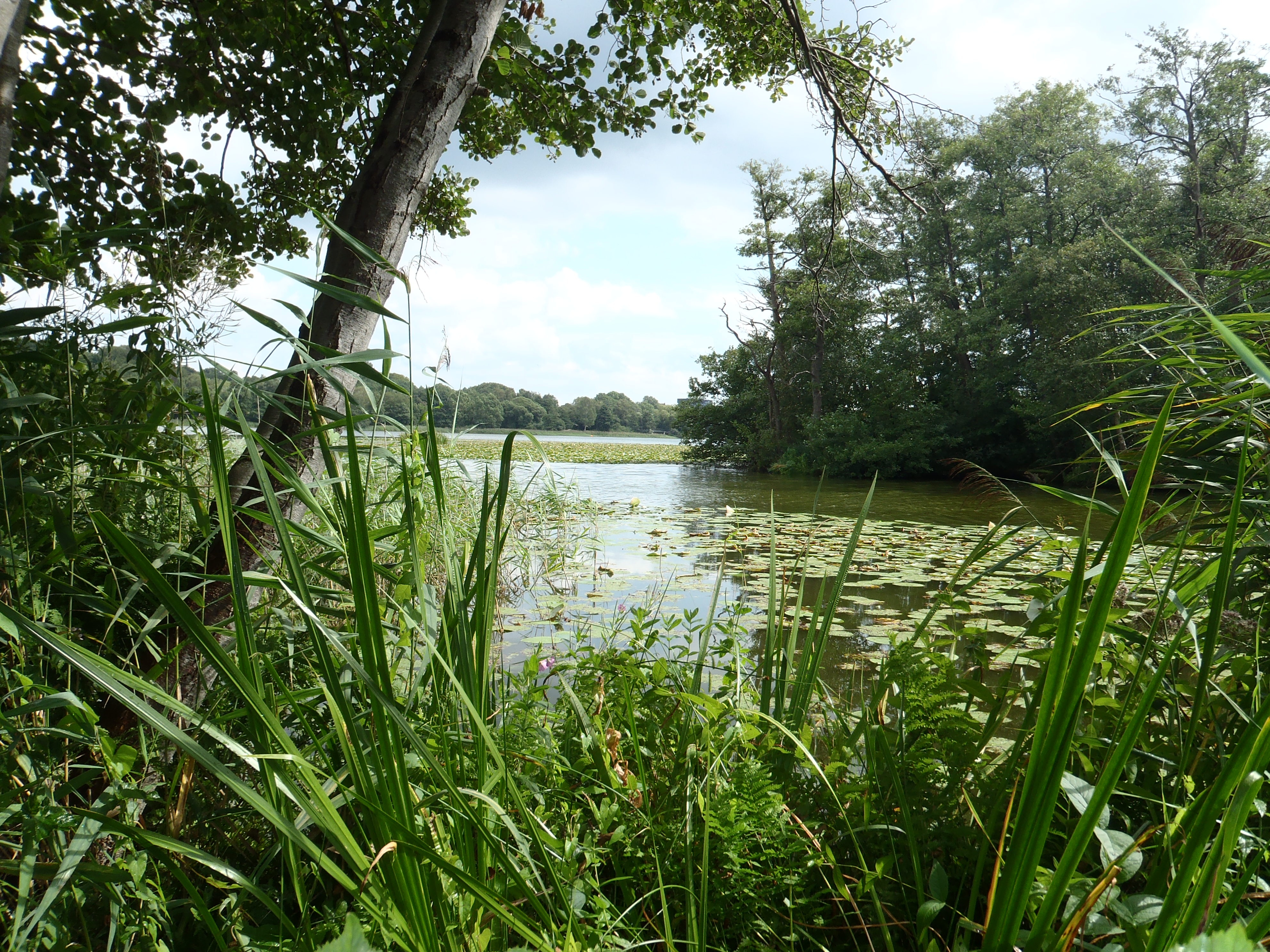
- Lake Lyngby

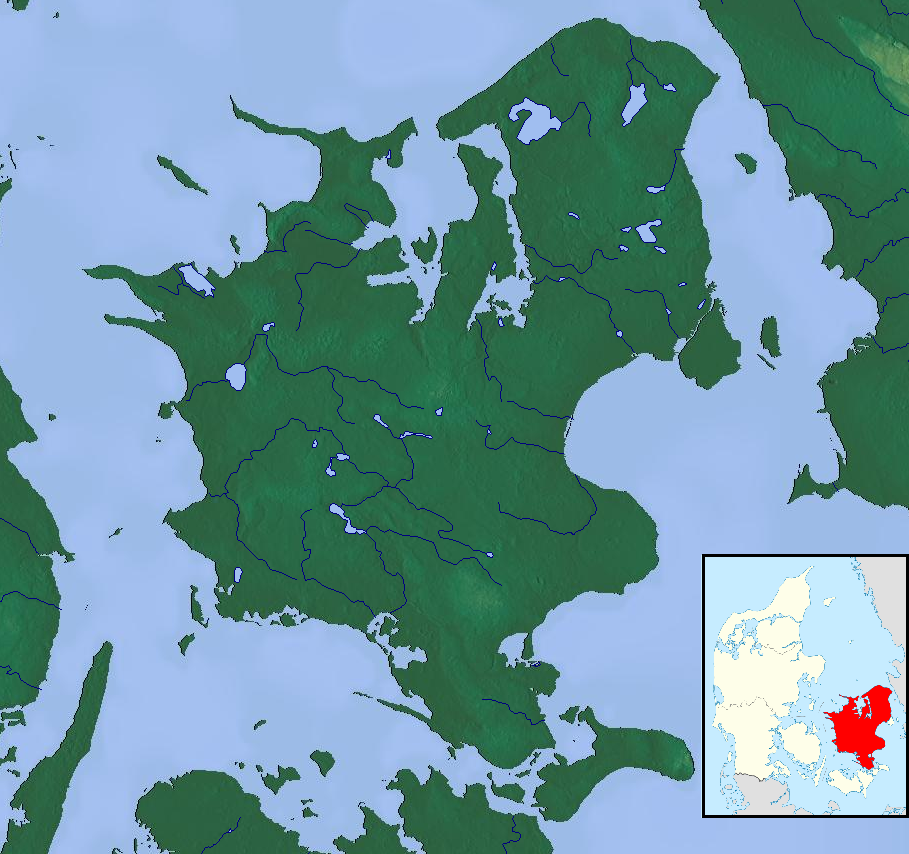
- Location within Zealand
- Location: Copenhagen
- Coordinates: 55°46′26″N 12°28′58″E
- Primary inflows: Mølleåen
- Primary outflows: Mølleåen
- Surface area: 57.1 ha (141 acres)
- Max. depth: 3.3 m (11 ft)
- Water volume: 940,000 m^{3} (760 acre⋅ft)
- Surface elevation: 19 m (62 ft)

Lyngby Lake (Danish: Lyngby Sø) is a lake located on the border between Lyngby-Taarbæk and Gladsaxe municipalities in the northern suburbs of Copenhagen, Denmark. It is the smallest of the four lakes that are located on Mølleåen. At the east end of the lake is an embankment with a lake promenade, S-train line and Lyngby bypass. A small portion of the lake, known as Lille Lyngby Sø is located on the east side of the embankment.

Lyngby Lake has an area of 57.1 hectares. It is fed with water from Furesø through a short canal from the west and is drained at its eastern end.

== History ==
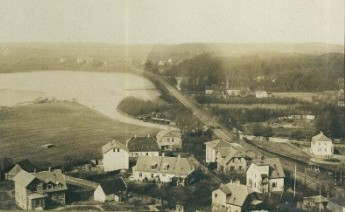
Early houses on the lake shore in 1904

The lake was formed when the ice melted at the end of the last ice age. The water level in the lake was in the Middle Ages raised artificially to improve the operation of watermills further downstream. Lyngby Watermill was probably built in around 1000.

Nordbanen was constructed in 1864. The plan was originally to lead the railway through Sorgenfri Park to the east of Lyngby Church. Due to local opposition, a more expensive solution with an embankment across the eastern part of Lyngby Lake was ultimately opted for.

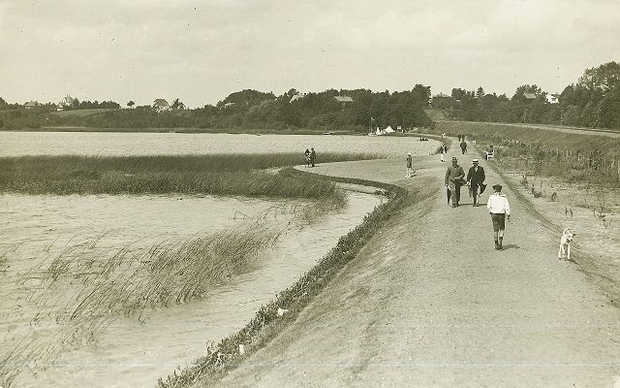
The Lake Promenade

The opening of the railway led to increasing building activity along the shores of the lake. A lake promenade was established at the embankment in 1920 to improve access to the lake for residents in the area. In 1928, the municipality established Folkeparken after acquiring another property on the lake shore. It was used for events both on Constitution Day and Midsummer's Eve. In the 1930s and 1940s, Lyngby-Taarbæk Municipality acquired Lyngby Åmose to the north of the lake which had until then belonged to the farmers in Virum.

== Activities ==
A number of canoe, kayak and rowing clubs are based at the lake. Lyngby Towing Club and Lyngby Canoe club are based at Lyngby Harbour at Fæstningskanalen in the southeastern corner of the lake. Lyngby Rowing Club for Women (Lyngby Dameroklub) is located on the southern shores of the lake. Fladsaxe Canoe & Kayak Club is based a little further to the west.

A tour boat operates on the lake with stops both at Lyngby Harbour and Nybro Kro before it continues to Frederiksdal. Boat rental is available both at Havnehytten and Nybro Kro.

Fishing in the lake requires a fishing license. A network of paths continues around the lake. It is popular both with walkers and runners. Folkeparken is used for festivities with a large bonfire on Saint John's Eve.

== Cultural references ==
- The German poet Friedrich Gottlieb Klopstock's Der Eislauf was inspired by his ice skating on Lake Lyngby. He lived in Denmark from 1751 to 1770.
- Christian Winther' poem Vandring og Opdagelse (Wandering and Discovering) describes a walk on 5 July 1833 from Miiffelmann's summer retreat Fuglsang at Prinsessestien and Lake Lyngby to Furesøen og and beyond.
- A boat trip made by the couples Ingeborg and Viggo Stuckenberg and Gyrithe and Johan Lemche on Lake Lyngby is described in Gyrithe Lemche's Tempeltjenere from 1926-1928.

== See also ==
- Gentofte Lake
