= Gentofte =

Danish town

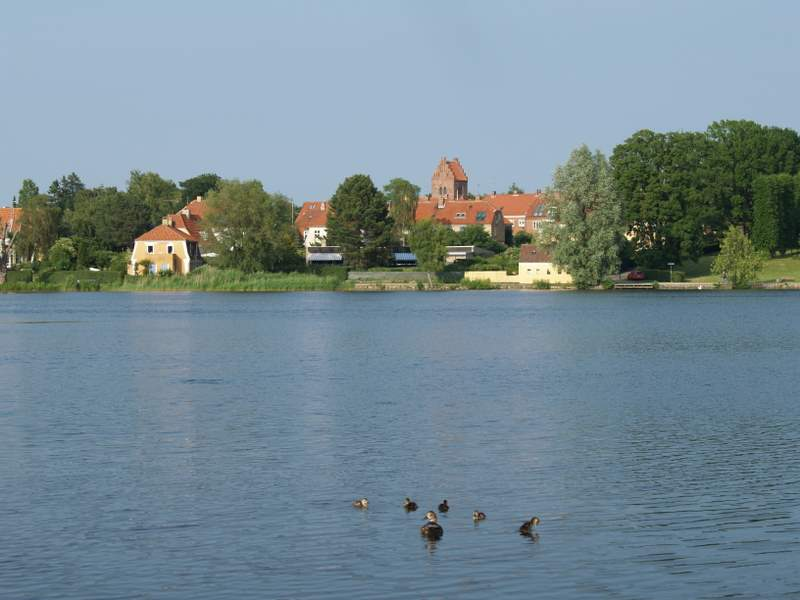
Gentofte with Gentofte Lake in the foreground

Gentofte (Danish pronunciation: [ˈkɛntsʰʌftə]) is a district of Gentofte Municipality in the northern suburbs of Copenhagen, Denmark. Major landmarks include Gentofte Town Hall, Gentofte Hospital and Gentofte Church. Gentofte Lake with surrounding parkland and nature reserves form the most important greenspace.

== Geography ==
Gentofte is roughly bounded by Lyngbyvej to the west, the S-train line to Hillerød to the northeast, Bernstorffsvej to the east and Kildegårdsvej to the south. The southern border with Hellerup is, however, not clearly defined. Gentofte postal district has a somewhat different definition. Gentofte, as defined by Gentofte Municipality, covers circa 335 hectares or 13% of the municipality's total. On 1 January 2012 the district had 8,289 residents, equaling 11% of the total population of Gentofte Municipality.

Gentofte Lake is a dominant geographical feature. The highest point is Ræveskovsbakken. The most urban part of the district is centred on the central part of Gentoftegade, Gentofte Torv and part of Baunegårdsvej. Secondary centre is located in the periphery of the district at Bernstorffsvej and Kildegårds Plads.

== History ==
=== Early history ===
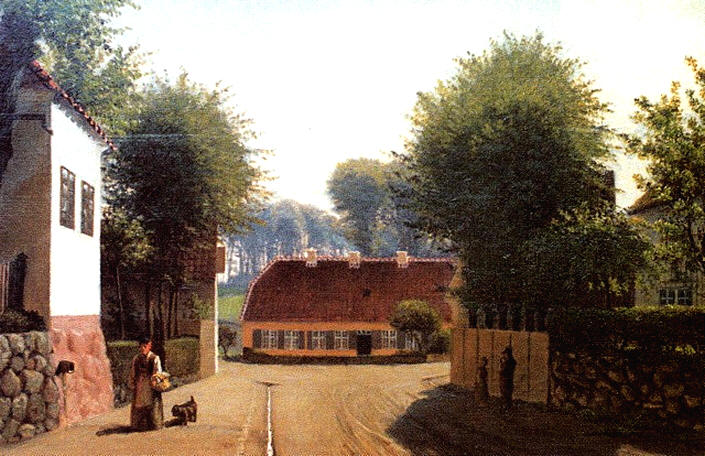
Gentofte Rytterskole Palace

The area around Gentofte Lake has been inhabited since the Stone Age. The name Gentofte is first seen in a gift letter from Absalon to the Bishop of Roskilde from 1186. The gift comprises extensive parts of what is now Copenhagen, including "...mansionem de Gefnetofte cum omnibus pertenentiis suis" (Gentofte House with all its land). Gentofte is most likely considerably older since place names with the suffix -tofte have usually emerged during the 9th century.

The area was confiscated by the crown during the Reformation. It was placed under Ibstrup Ladegård which was renamed Jægersborg by Christian V. Tax records show that Gentofte had approximately 450 residents in 1645. In 1685 the village consisted of 19 farms. One of them (probably Gentoftegård) had been given to Queen Charlotte Amalie as a wedding present. A "cavalry school", the first of its kind in Denmark, opened in 1720.

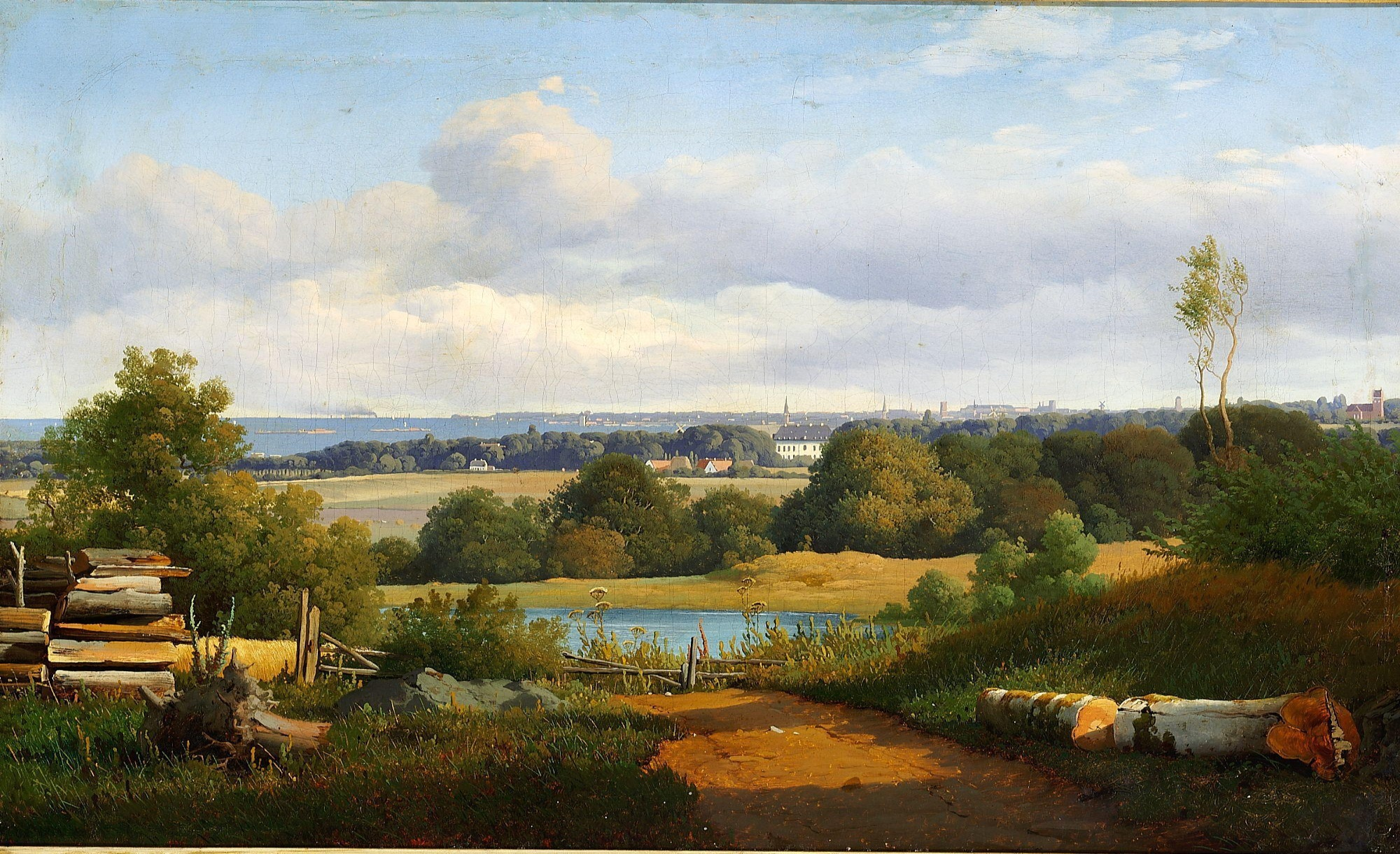
The Gentofte area seen from the north with Gentofte Church and Bernstorff Palace

The entire area was acquired by Foreign Minister Johann Hartwig Ernst von Bernstorff in 1752 and his new Bernstorff Palace was completed in 1765. Bernstorffsvej, a new road linking Lyngby Kongevej with the palace, opened in 1770.

Bernstorff was a driving force behind the agricultural reforms of the 1780s and the farmers were there the first in Denmark to get to own their own land. Most of the farms were moved out of the village to be closer to their land.

A parish council was established in 1842. The opening of the railway to Lyngby in 1863 resulted in increased population growth in Gentofte. In the 1870s, the population increased from 4,158 to 5,106

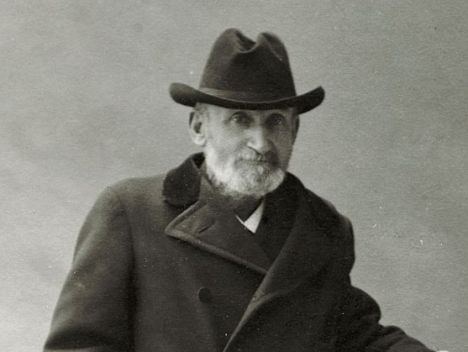
Carl Ludvig Ibsen

In 1887, Carl Ludvig Ibsen began to acquire land in the Gentoffte-Gellerup area. His plan was to sell it off in lots to developers and private citizens. He purchased Smakkegård, Rygård, Lundegård and Stengård in Gentofte. In 1916, Ibsen placed his remaining land in a company, A/S De Ibsenske Grunde i Gjentofte Sogn, which existed until 1945.

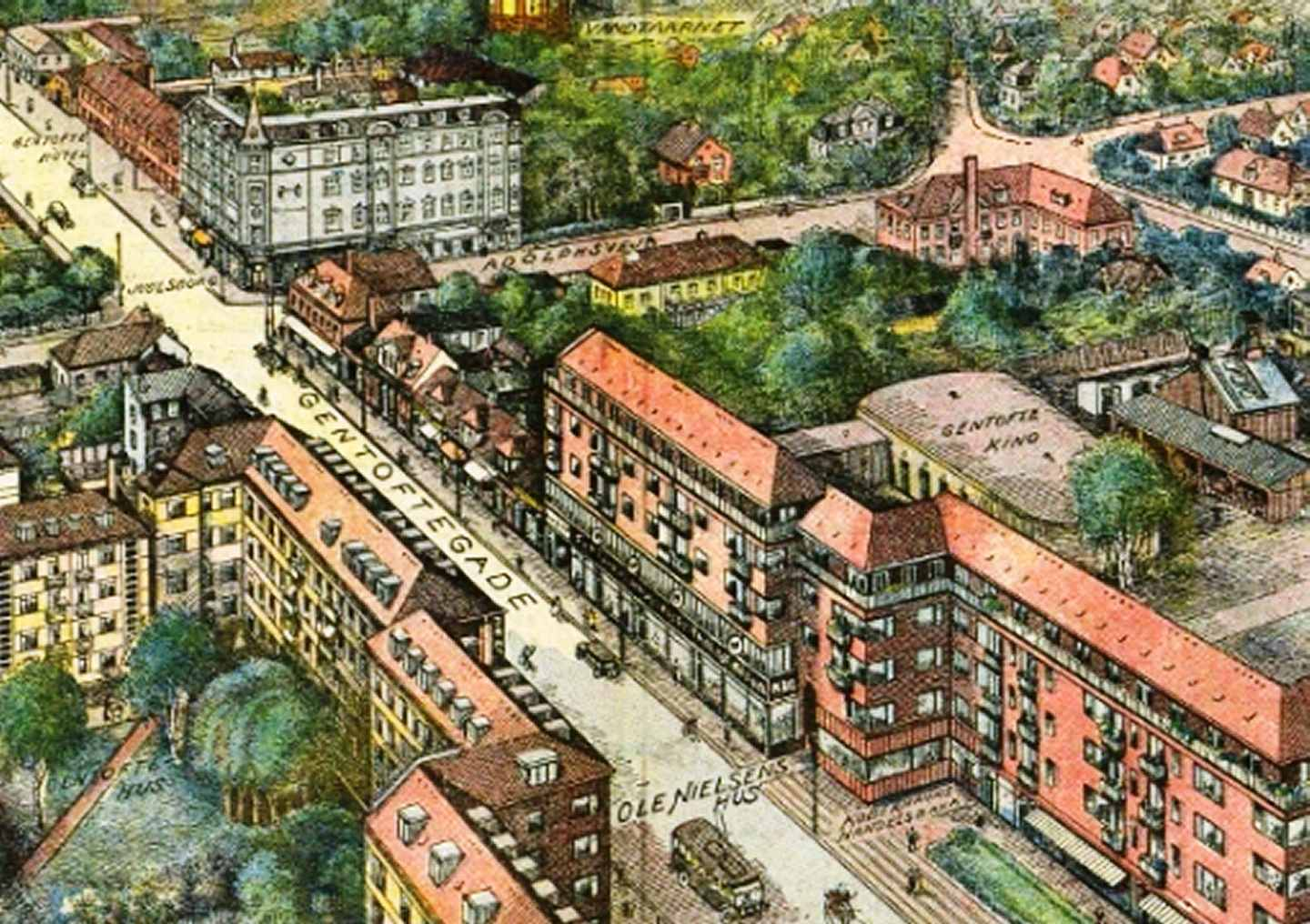
Franz Šedivý: Gentofte Main Street in 1929

A telephone central opened on 14 August 1899. Gentoftegade was connected to Kildegårdsvej in 1906 and a tramway began to operate on the route in 1907.

== Landmarks ==
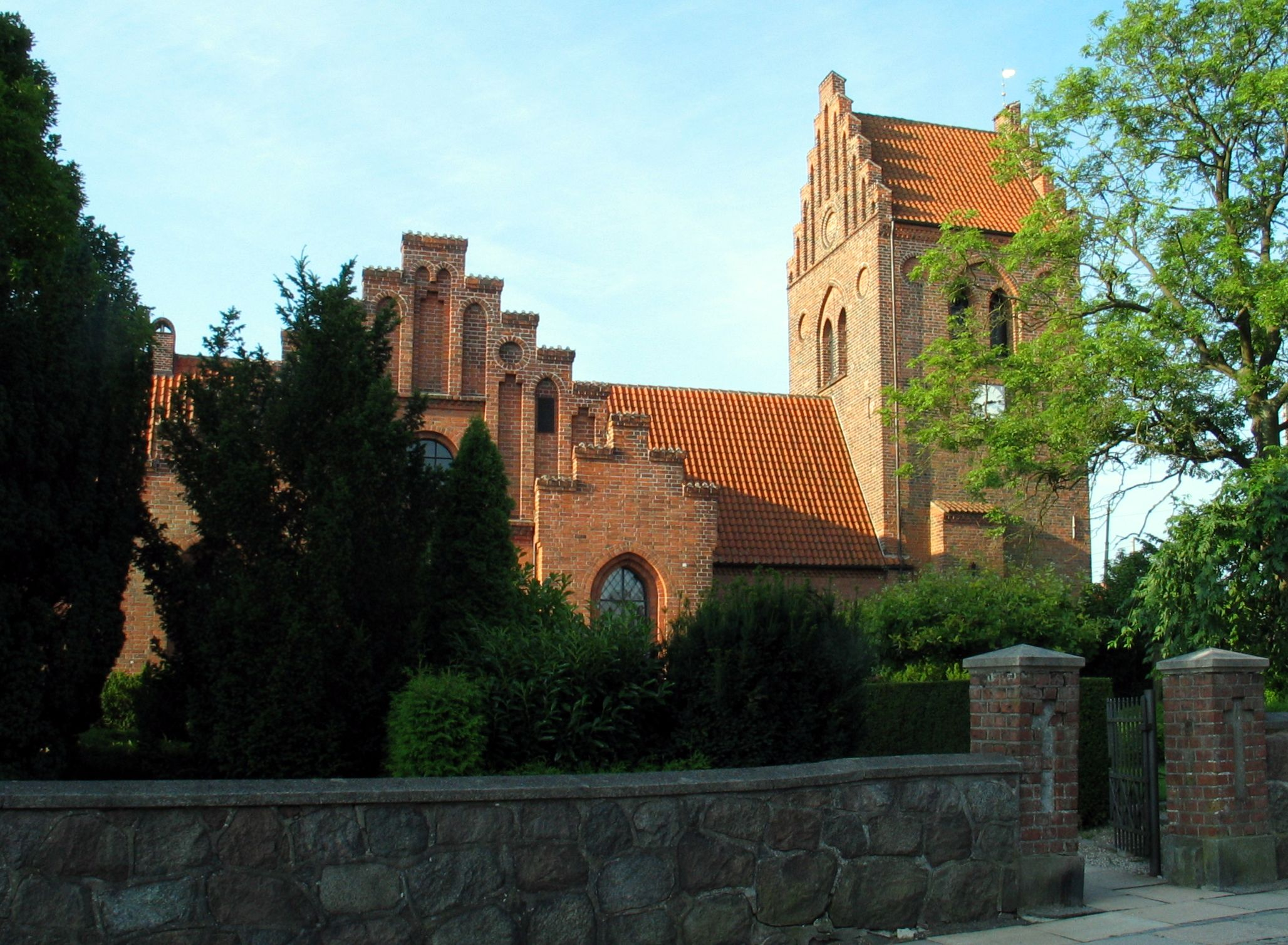
Gentofte Church

Gentofte Church dates from the 12th century and is the oldest church in Gentofte Municipality. Gentofte Town Hall is from 1938 and was designed by Thorvald Jørgensen. Gentofte Hospital opened in 1927. The Neoclassical complex was designed by Emil Jørgensen and Helge Bojsen-Møller. It is a hospital for residents in the municipalities of Gentofte, Lyngby-Taarbæk and Rudersdal.

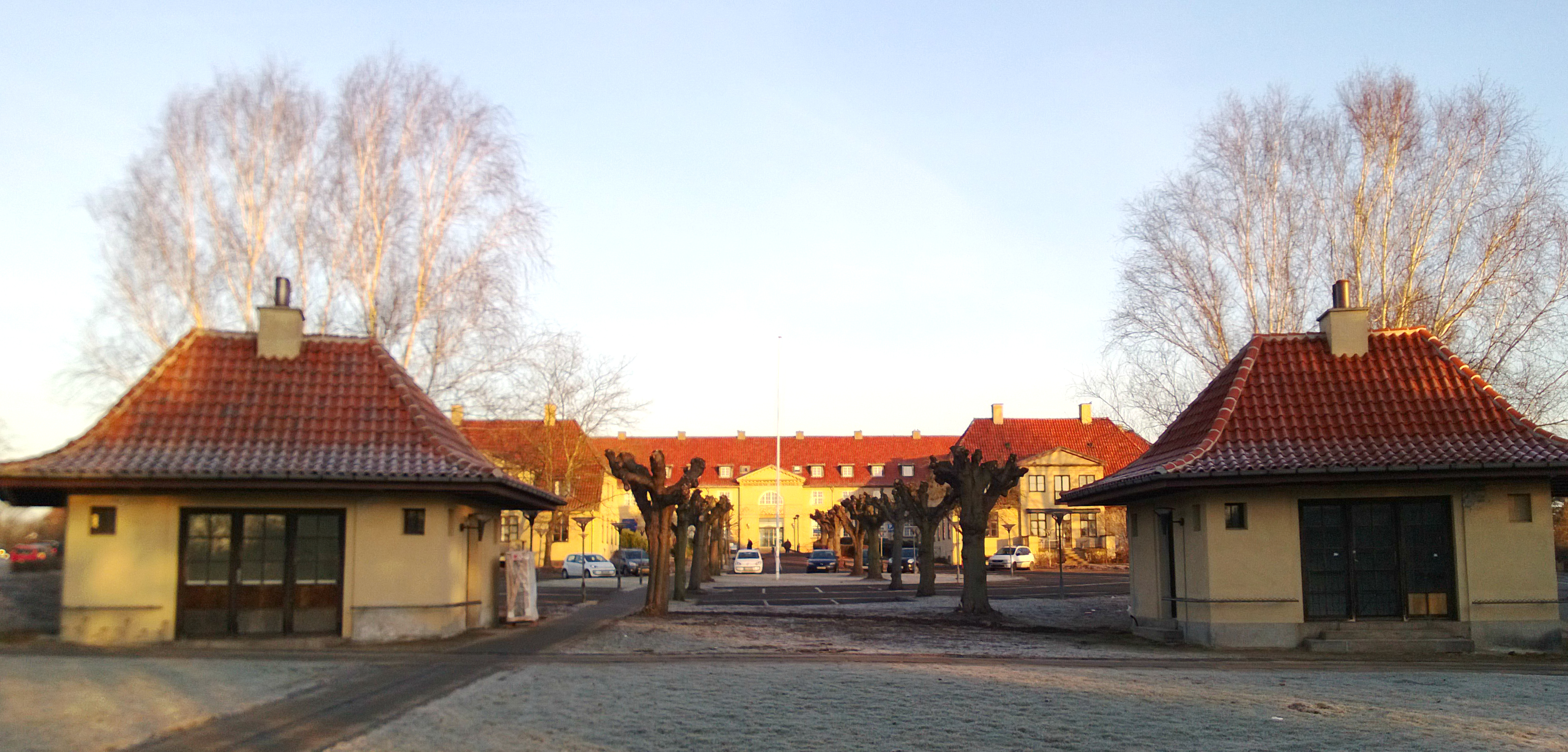
Gentofte Hospital

Gentofte is home to the public primary schools, Tjørnegårdsskolen and Gentofte Skole, and the special school Søgårdsskolen as well as the private primary school Vidarskole. It is also home to the upper secondary school Aurehøj Gymnasium and Gentofte HF.

Gentofte Sportspark in the northern part of Gentofte is the principal hub for sports in the municipality. Gentofte is also home to the indoor swimming venue Kildeskovshallen, a tennis venue and an equestrian centre at Maltegårdsvej.

== Parks and open spaces ==
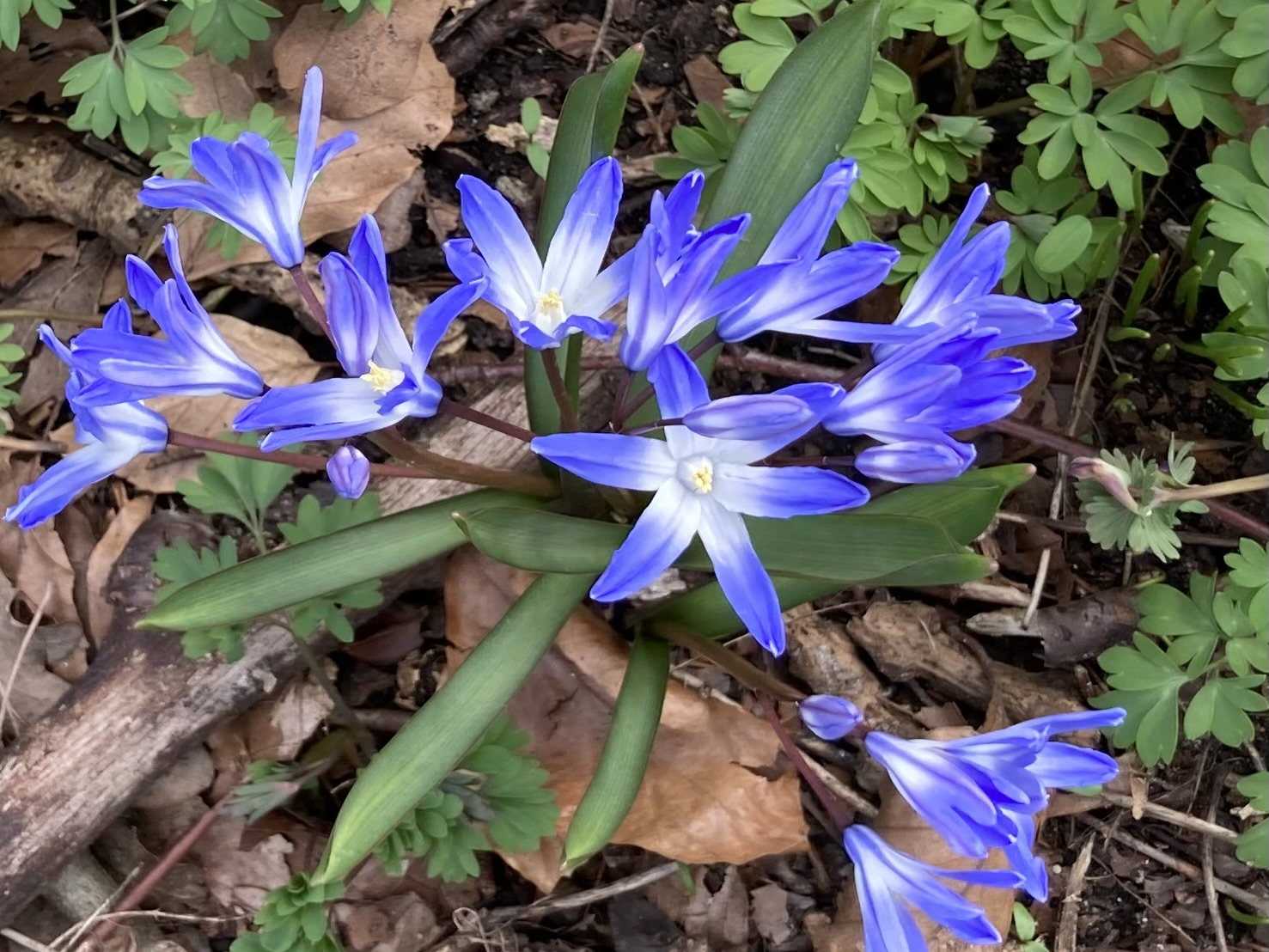
Scilla, spring flowers in Kildeskoven

Gentofte Park, Gentofte Lake with the adjacent Brobæk Mose and Kildeskoven are the principal green spaces in Gentofte. The district is also home to Gentofte Cemetery.

== Transport ==
Gentofte station is located on the Hillerød radial of the S-train network.

== Notable people ==
=== The arts ===
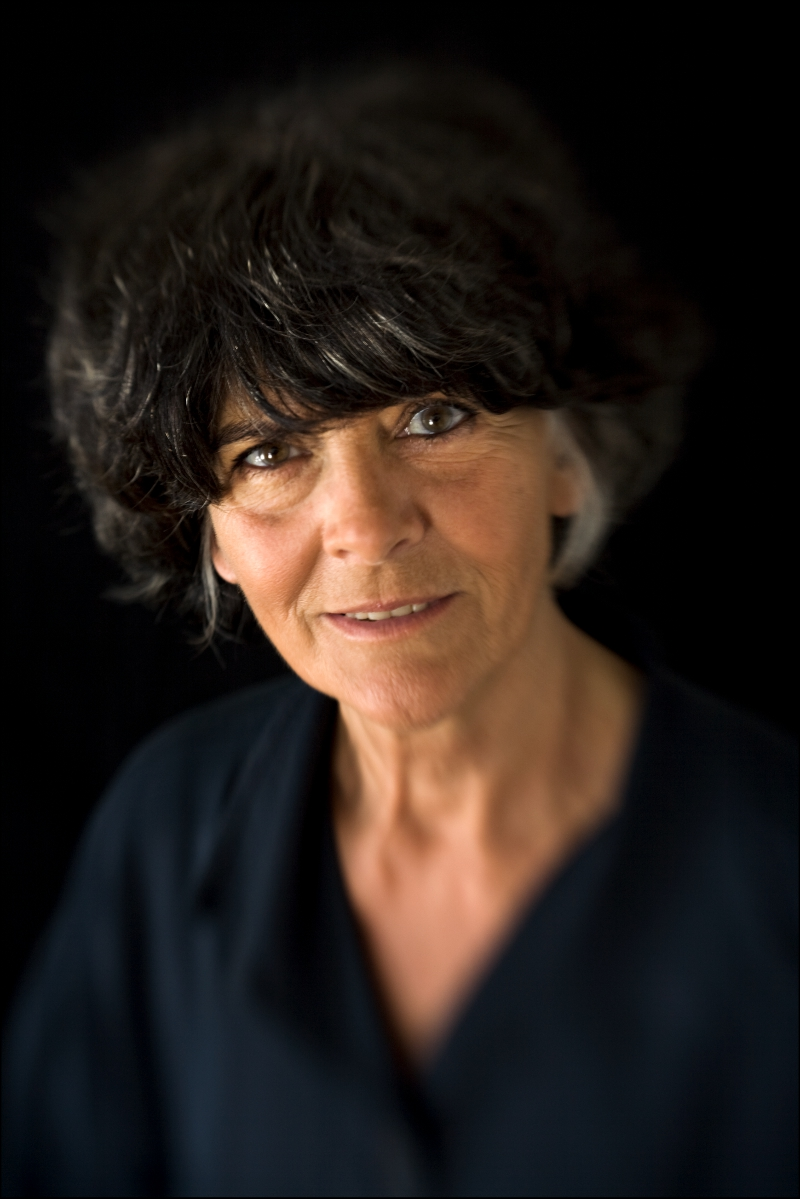
Jane Reumert, 2008

- Svend Johansen (1890–1970), painter, scenographer and illustrator
- Gertie Wandel (1894–1988), textile artist and local politician
- Bjørn Puggaard-Müller (1922–1989), actor
- Helle Thorborg (born 1927), painter and graphic designer
- Toni Lander (1931–1985), ballerina
- Per Nørgård (1932–2025), composer
- Jane Reumert (1942–2016), ceramist
- Nina Sten-Knudsen (born 1957), painter
- Lars Ulrich (born 1963), musician and songwriter, drummer of American heavy metal band Metallica
- Jacob Gils (born c. 1965), contemporary art photographer
- Agnes Obel (born 1980), singer-songwriter and musician

=== Academics, science, and business ===
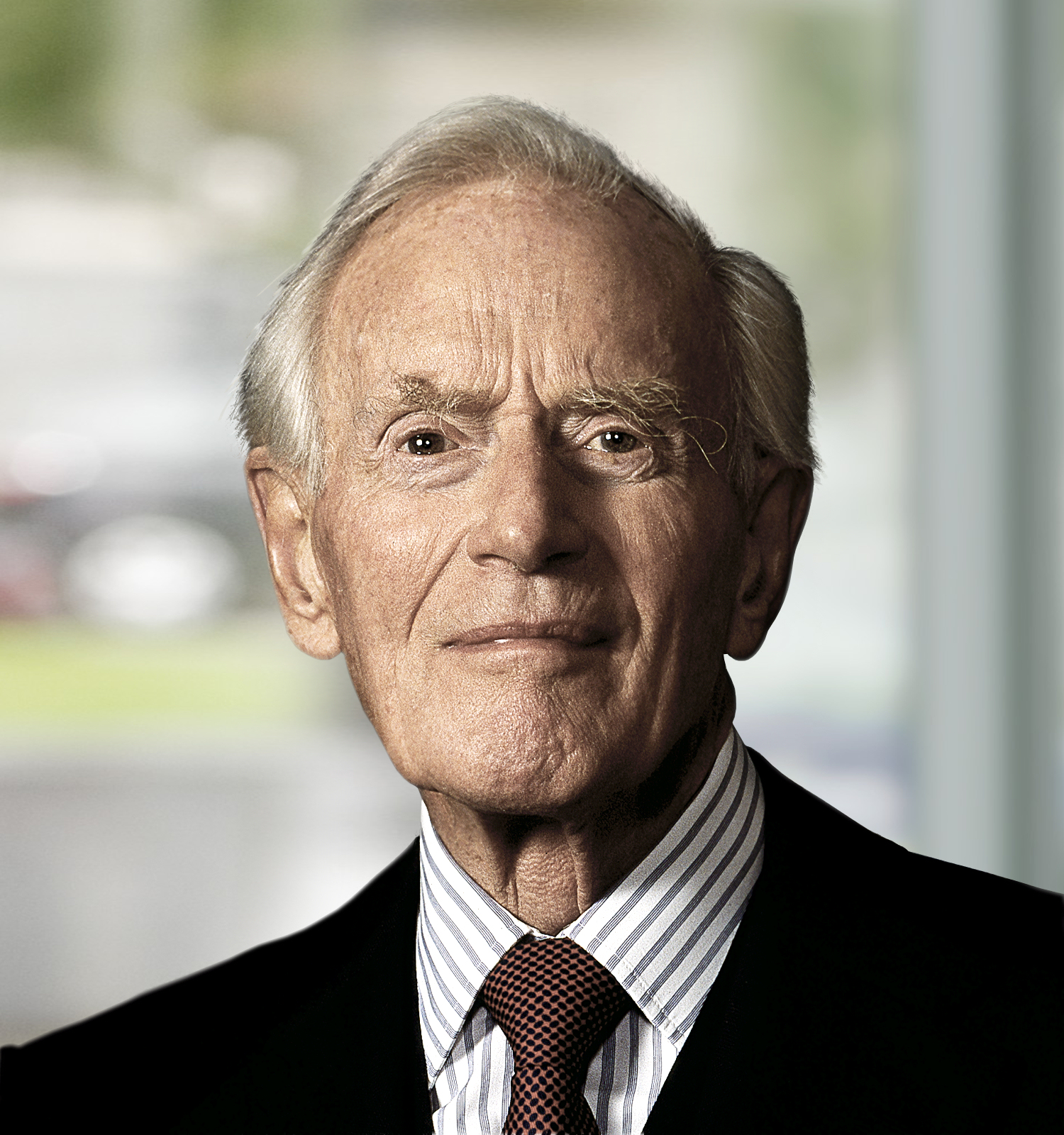
Mærsk-McKinney-Møller, 2010

- Børge Bak, (1912–1990), Danish scientist, lived and died here
- John Brown, (1723–1808), Scottish-Danish merchant and ship-owner, died here
- Birgitte Cathrine Boye (1742–1824), hymnwriter
- Arne Jacobsen (1902–1971), architect and furniture designer, built extensively here
- Mærsk Mc-Kinney Møller (1913–2012), shipping tycoon, Denmark's wealthiest person, lived here
- Peter Naur (1928–2016), computer scientist, lived here
- Ida Blom (1931–2016), Norwegian historian and academic
- Eske Willerslev (born 1971), evolutionary geneticist
- Rane Willerslev (born 1971), anthropologist
- Claire Maxwell (born 1975), German-Australian sociologist, lived here

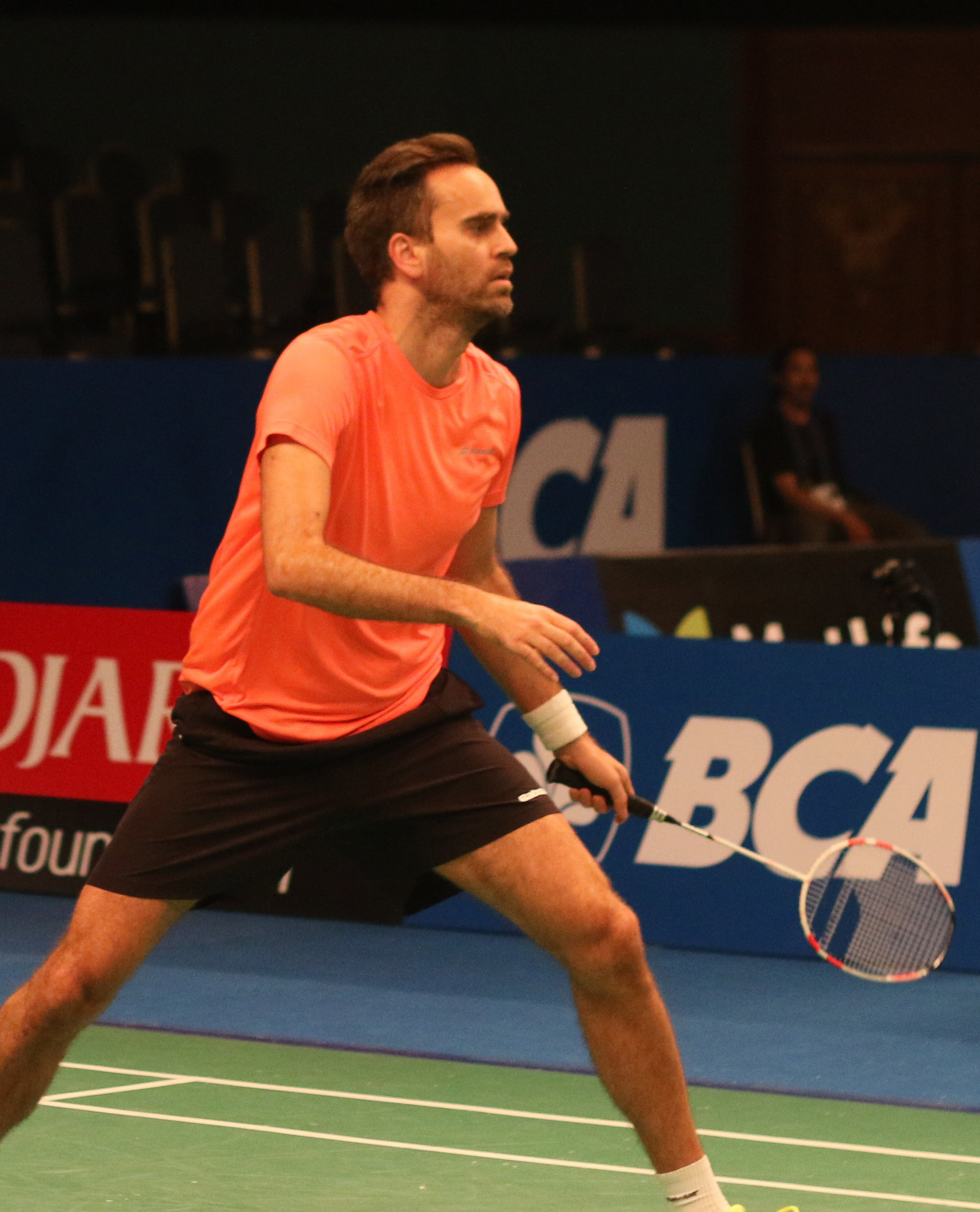
Joachim Fischer Nielsen, 2017

=== Sport ===
- Erik Andersen (1904–1938), chess master
- Knud Bastrup-Birk (1919–1973), footballer
- Lars Dresler (1968–1995), figure skater
- Anja Bolbjerg (born 1971), freestyle skier
- Sune Berg Hansen (born 1971), chess grandmaster
- Joachim Fischer Nielsen (born 1978), badminton player & Olympic medallist
- Christoffer Nygaard (born 1986), racing driver
- Sofie Svava (born 2000), footballer
- Holger Rune (born 2003), tennis player
