= Leif Schiller =

Leif Schiller (4 April 1939 - 21 October 2007) was a Danish fashion and commercial photographer. During his working career, Schiller worked with supermodels Helena Christensen, Naomi Campbell, Stephanie Seymour and many more. Schiller did print campaigns for most European fashion houses and fashion magazines, and he also did campaigns for clients such as Revlon, Georg Jensen, Budweiser, Magasin du Nord, Faxe Beer, V6 and Ecco Shoes. Schiller also did Europe's most expensive print campaign for Hennessy Cognac at the Trevi Fountain in Rome, Italy - the total cost of a one day's photoshoot was $2.000.000.

== Career ==
In 1967, after running the studios simultaneously in New York and Copenhagen, Leif Schiller founded Schiller & Co. Facility House, hosting more than 30 independent and creatively individual companies with photography as the main theme. The companies include Q-lab, Schiller Digital, Schiller Interactive and the shared creative offices for individual creative companies, such as the production company Locomotion. Schiller & Co. Facility House is still listed as today's biggest European facility house with photography as the main theme.

In 2000, Leif Schiller received a Photographer of the Century Award from the Dansk Fotografi Forening (Danish Photographers Association).

In 2003, Leif Schiller did the world's largest commercial photo for Lyngby Storcenter shopping mall. The photo included 18 scenes, 92 models, 4 animals, 3 pieces of 3-D generated models, 25 persons production team. The length of photoshoot was 14 days. Production took 38 days. There were 93 pieces for scanning, 358 silhouettes, 458 picture layers and the total size of photo was 1,325 GB. The photo received a MAXI Merit Award in the category "Consumer Advertising" at the International Council of Shopping Centers Awards in Las Vegas, USA.

In his later career, Leif Schiller devoted himself to work on The Insight and Foresight Association, of which he was a creator. The Association was set up to uplift the ghetto-heavy part of Copenhagen, Nørrebro, and help children and teenagers to be creative and thus integrate better into Danish society. Schiller was in charge of teaching the children and teenagers how to photograph, which resulted in Denmark's largest outdoor photo exhibition, hosted by Galleri Hamlet in Hamletsgade, Copenhagen. Due to that project, Leif Schiller was featured on Denmark's Radio TV channel, had an article on Copenhagen Kommune website and Paa Gaden magazine.
