= Gammelmose =

Protected area near Copenhagen, Denmark

- Gammelmose i Vangede
- IUCN category IV (habitat/species management area)
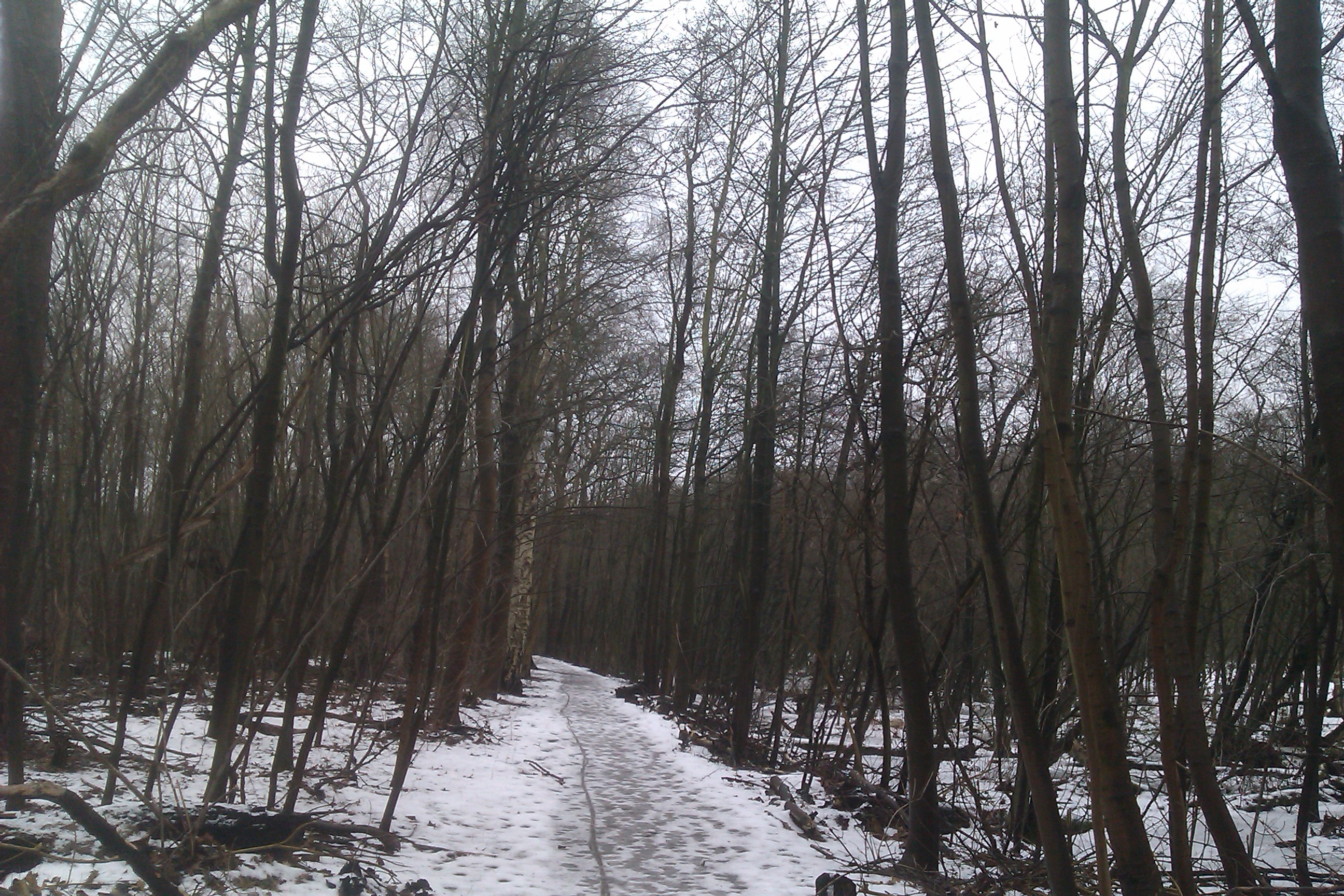
- Gammelmose in wintertime

- Location within Denmark
- Coordinates: 55.754°N 12.504°E
- Area: 20 ha (49 acres)
- Designated: February 28, 1844

Gammelmose (Danish for 'Old Bog') is a former raised bogland separating Vangede from Kongens Lyngby in the northern suburbs of Copenhagen, Denmark. It covers an area of approximately 20 hectares (49 acres).

== History ==
Gammelmose belonged to the Bernstorff Estate and was used for harvesting of peat. These resources were almost depleted in the first half of the 19th century. King Christian VIII, who owned the estate, protected the site by royal decree in 1844. This was done to provide a locality for the scientific study of the natural formation of peat and the recovery of a depleted peat bog. It is the earliest example of a protection of a natural habitat for scientific reasons in Denmark.

In 1918, Gammelmose was the first locality to be included under the new Nature Protection Act, and is today listed as an IUCN category IV protected area. The area was reduced by three hectares in connection with an expansion of the Ring 3 motorway. Only researchers were formerly allowed to enter the nature reserve. In 2008, it was opened to the public on designated paths in the periphery of the area.
