= Engelsborgskolen =

Elementary school in Copenhagen, Denmark

Engelsborg School
- Engelsborgskolen
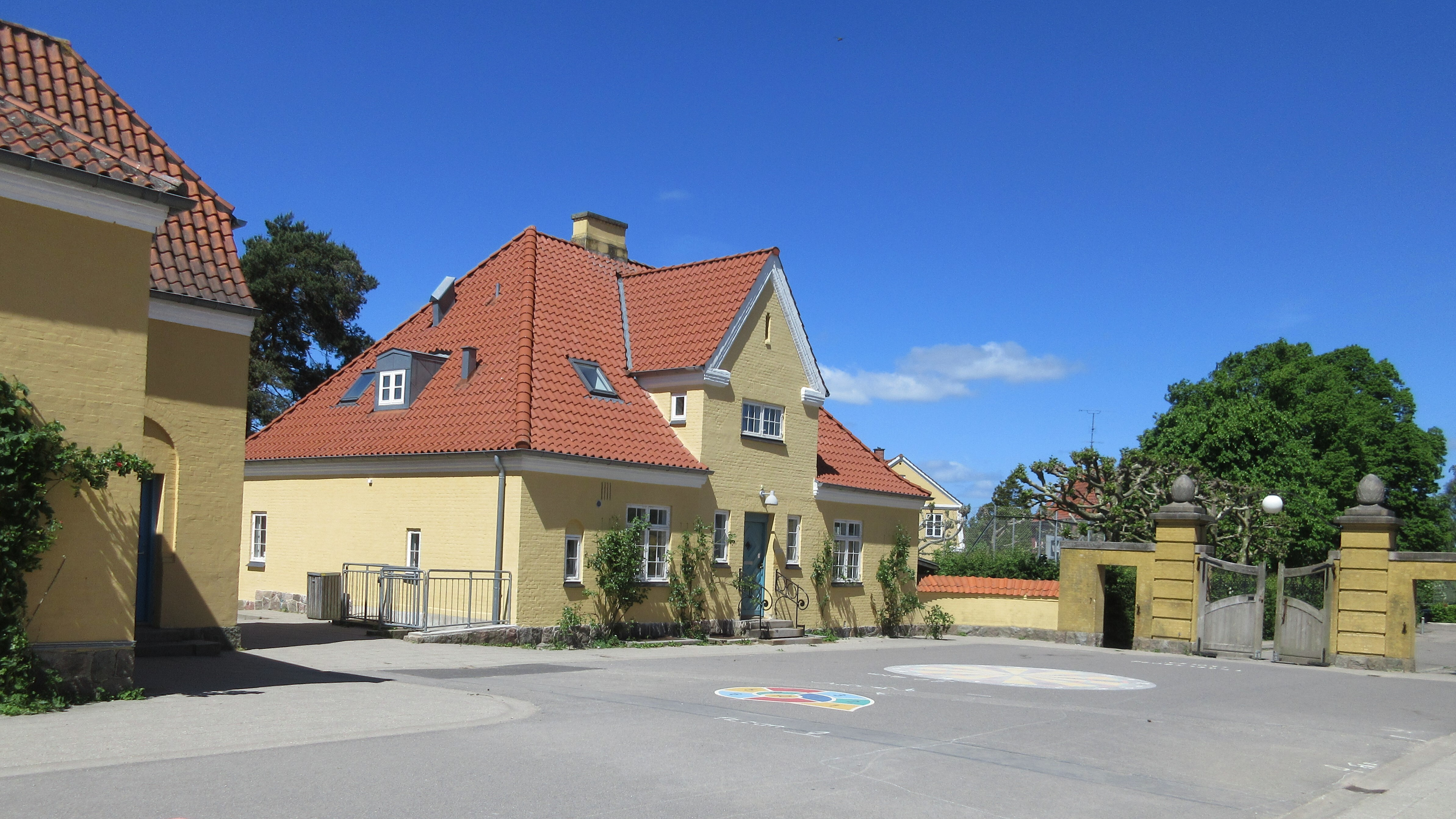

Location
- Engelsborgvej 66, 2800 Kongens Lyngby
- Coordinates: 55°45′57.16″N 12°29′29.45″E

Information
- School type: Elementary Public
- Established: 1909; 117 years ago
- Principal: Bettina Kallenbach
- Grades: Reception - Year 10
- Gender: Co-ed
- Age: 6 to 16
- Enrolment: 1,000 (2017)
- Language: Danish
- Website: Website

Engelsborgskolen is a public primary school in the western part of Kongens Lyngby, Lyngby-Taarbæk Municipality, Copenhagen, Denmark. Inaugurated in 1909, it is the oldest active school in Lyngby-Taarbæk. It has been used as a location in a number of films and television series, including as Little Per's school in the original Father of Four films.

== History ==
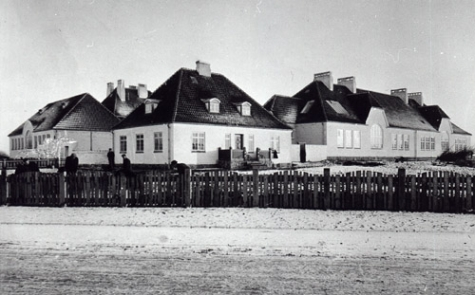
Engelsborgskolen

The first school in Kongens Lyngby, a rytterskole, was built next to the village pond in 1722. It was expanded with a two-storey brick building in 1882. The old rytterskole building from 1722 was replaced by a new residence for the school principal in 1904. The local population was growing steadily and Lyngby School soon became too small. It was therefore decided to build a new school at Engelsborgsvej.

The school was founded on 30 January 1909. Exams were introduced in 1918. The school has later been expanded several times, for instance with the construction of a new main building in 1935 and again in 1978. The school was refurbished and expanded by Rubow Arkitekter in 2008.

== Premises ==
The new main building from 1935 contains classrooms for the older students. The old main building contains science rooms and is also home to the school dentist. Building B from 1978 and contains workshops and classrooms for mid-level students. Building H contains administration and facilities for teachers. A new sports hall was built in 2011.

== In popular culture ==
Engelsborgskolen has been used for all schoolyard scenes in the seven original Far til fire (Father of Four) film in the period 1953 to 1961. The school has also been used as a location in the films Lise kommer til byen (1947), Vejrhanen (1952), Sunes familie (1997) and Bølle Bob og Smukke Sally (2005) as well as in the TV2 Christmas calendar Brødrene Mortensens jul (1998, 2002).
