= Kildeskovshallen =

Sports venue in Copenhagen, Denmark

Coordinates: 55.7465°N 12.5519°E

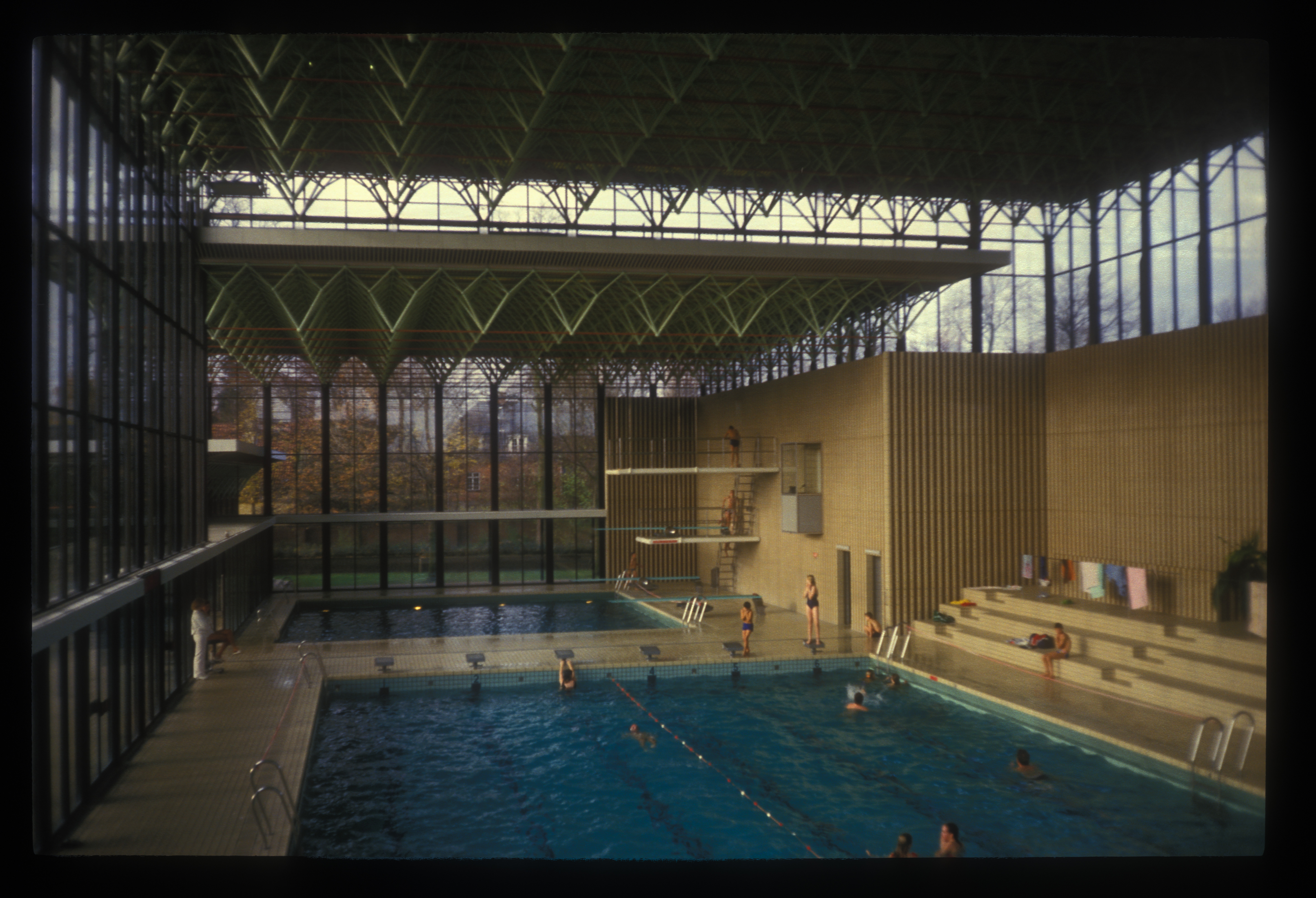

Kildeskovhallen is a sports venue in Gentofte in northern Copenhagen, Denmark.

== History ==
The original venue was designed by Karen and Ebbe Clemmensen and built in two phases. The swimming venue was built in 1966-1969. It was followed by two halls for ball games in 1970-1972. The complex was listed in 1998.

The swimming venue was expanded with a new 50 m pool and a hot water basin designed by Entasis in 2001.

== Facilities ==
Kildeskovhallen is home ground for the basketball club SISU Copenhagen, Hellerup IK's handball side and Gentofte Volley.

The facilities for swimmers include a 25 m pool, a 50 m pool, a children's pool, a baby pool and a hot water basin.

Other facilities include conference rooms, a physiotherapist clinic, fitness centre and a restaurant.
