= Dyssegårdsskolen =

Dyssegård School
- Dyssegårdsskolen

Location
- Dyssegårdsvej 26, 2900 Hellerup

Information
- School type: Elementary Public
- Established: 1932; 94 years ago
- Principal: Maj-Britt Overbye
- Staff: 80
- Grades: Reception - Year 10
- Gender: Co-ed
- Age: 6 to 16
- Enrolment: c. 730 (2016)
- Language: Danish
- Website: Website

Dyssegårdsskolen is a public primary school in the Dyssegård district of Gentofte Municipality, Greater Copenhagen, Denmark.

== History ==
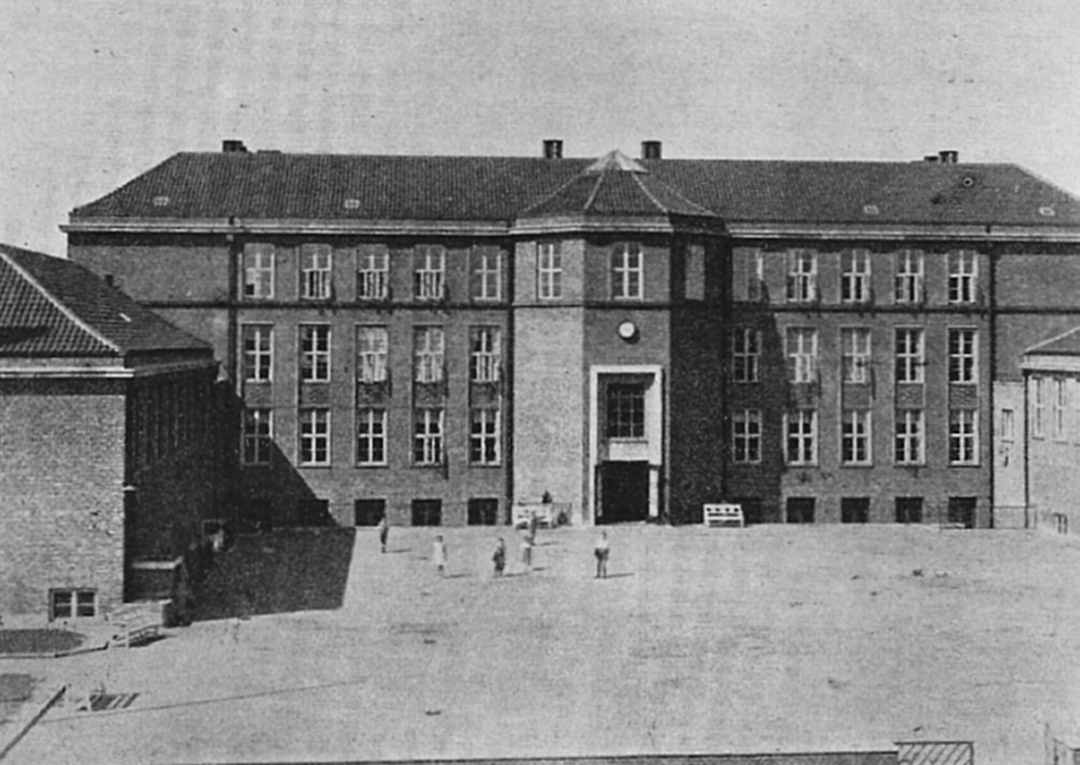
Dyssegård School in 1935

In autumn 1929 Gentofte Municipality launched an architectural competition for a new public primary school in the growing Dyssegård neighborhood. They received 90 entries and a proposal from the architects Alfred Brandt, Gustav Bartolin Hagen and Carl Schiøtz was selected as the final winner. The school broke ground in August 1930 and was completed in the summer of 1932. It received the first pupils on 16 August 1932 and was officially inaugurated on 8 September. The school initially had 16 teachers and its first principal was N.P. Nissen. A planned swimming pool in the basement was never completed and it was instead converted into a temporary church room for Dyssegård Church District. It was inaugurated by bishop Harald Ostenfeld on 28 November 1933. The current Dyssegård Church was not built until 1961.

== See also ==
- List of educational institutions in Gentofte Municipality
