= Gentofte Municipality =

Gentofte Municipality Gentofte Kommune (Danish)
- Municipality
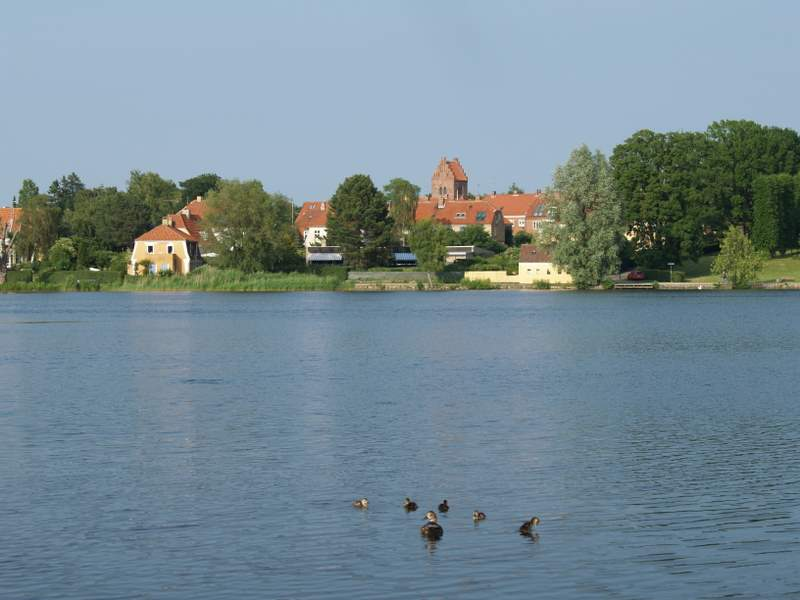

- Coat of arms

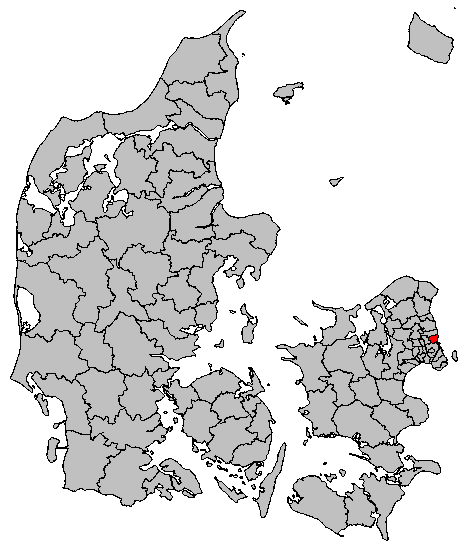
- Coordinates: 55°45′02″N 12°33′08″E
- Country: Denmark
- Region: Hovedstade
- Established: 1 January 1842
- Seat: Charlottenlund

Government
  - Mayor: Michael Fenger (C)

Area
  - Total: 25.54 km^{2} (9.86 sq mi)

Population (1 January 2026)
  - Total: 75,106
  - Density: 2,941/km^{2} (7,616/sq mi)
- Time zone: UTC+1 (CET)
  - Summer (DST): UTC+2 (CEST)
- Postal code: 2920
- Municipal code: 157
- Website: gentofte.dk

Gentofte Municipality (Danish: Gentofte Kommune) is a municipality (Danish, kommune) in the Capital Region of Denmark (Region Hovedstaden) on the east coast of the island of Zealand (Sjælland) in eastern Denmark. It covers an area of 25.54 km^{2} (9.86 sq mi), and has a total population of 75,106 (1 January 2026). Since 17 May 2021, its mayor has been Michael Fenger, a member of the Conservative People's Party (Det Konservative Folkeparti).

Gentofte is the most wealthy municipality in Denmark and consists of several fashionable Copenhagen suburbs such as Hellerup and Charlottenlund.

The municipality is an amalgamation of three formerly independent towns, and several other local settlements, all close to one another. The site of its municipal council is in Charlottenlund. The three original towns were Gentofte, Vangede and Ordrup. It later included Tuborg, Skovshoved, Dyssegård, Hellerup, Jægersborg, and Klampenborg.

Neighboring municipalities are Lyngby-Taarbæk to the north, Gladsaxe to the west, and Copenhagen to the south. The Øresund, the strait that separates Zealand from Sweden, is to the east.

Gentofte municipality was not merged with other municipalities in the 1 January 2007 nationwide Kommunalreformen.

Lars Ulrich, drummer and co-founder of the American heavy metal band Metallica, was born in Gentofte.

== Demography ==
Historical population of Gentofte

Year	Pop.	±%
1769	1,056	—
1787	1,526	+44.5%
1801	1,962	+28.6%
1840	2,750	+40.2%
1850	3,072	+11.7%
1860	3,660	+19.1%
1870	4,158	+13.6%
1880	5,106	+22.8%
1890	7,449	+45.9%
1901	14,470	+94.3%
1911	24,691	+70.6%

Year	Pop.	±%
1921	34,451	+39.5%
1930	47,848	+38.9%
1940	76,457	+59.8%
1950	87,803	+14.8%
1960	88,308	+0.6%
1970	77,744	−12.0%
1980	67,300	−13.4%
1990	65,303	−3.0%
2000	67,957	+4.1%
2009	70,000	+3.0%

Note: 1769's count refers to 15 January 1769; 1787's count refers to 1 July 1787.

== Politics ==
=== Municipal council ===
Gentofte's municipal council consists of 19 members, elected every four years.

Below are the municipal councils elected since the Municipal Reform of 2007.

Election	Party								Total seats	Turnout	Elected mayor
Election	A	B	C	F	I	T	V	Ø	Total seats	Turnout	Elected mayor
2005	2	2	9	1		1	2		17	68.8%	Hans Toft (C)
2009	3	2	10	2			2		19	66.3%	Hans Toft (C)
2013	3	1	11		1		2	1	19	72.4%	Hans Toft (C)
2017	2	1	13	1			1	1	19	71.6%	Hans Toft (C)
Data from Kmdvalg.dk 2005, 2009, 2013 and 2017

== Attractions ==
- Bellavista housing estate and Bellevue Teatret designed by Arne Jacobsen
- Bernstorff Palace
- Charlottenlund palace, park and forest
- Ordrupgaard – art museum, French impressionists, Paul Gauguin, Danish paintings from around 1900, varying special exhibitions.
- Gentofte Sportspark – football stadium, home stadium of Hellerup IK
- Kildeskovshallen- swimming pool (including a 50m pool, 25m pool, a children's pool, a baby pool with warm water basin, and also Finnish saunas), including also other facilities such as two halls for ball game, a physiotherapist clinique, fitness centre, conference rooms, and a restaurant.
- Øregård Museum

== Education ==
Gentofte Municipality is home to four public upper secondary schools: Øregård and Gammel Hellerup in Hellerup, Aurehøj in Gentofte and Ordrup Gymnasium in Ordrup. Gentofte Municipality is also home to the private Rygaards International School and Copenhagen International School, although the latter are going to relocate to new premises that are under construction in the Nordhavn district of Copenhagen. Gentofte Studenterkursus offers a two-year programme.

== Notable people ==
- King Haakon VII (1872–1957), Prince of Denmark/King of Norway
- Lars Ulrich (born 1963), drummer of Metallica

== Parks and open spaces ==
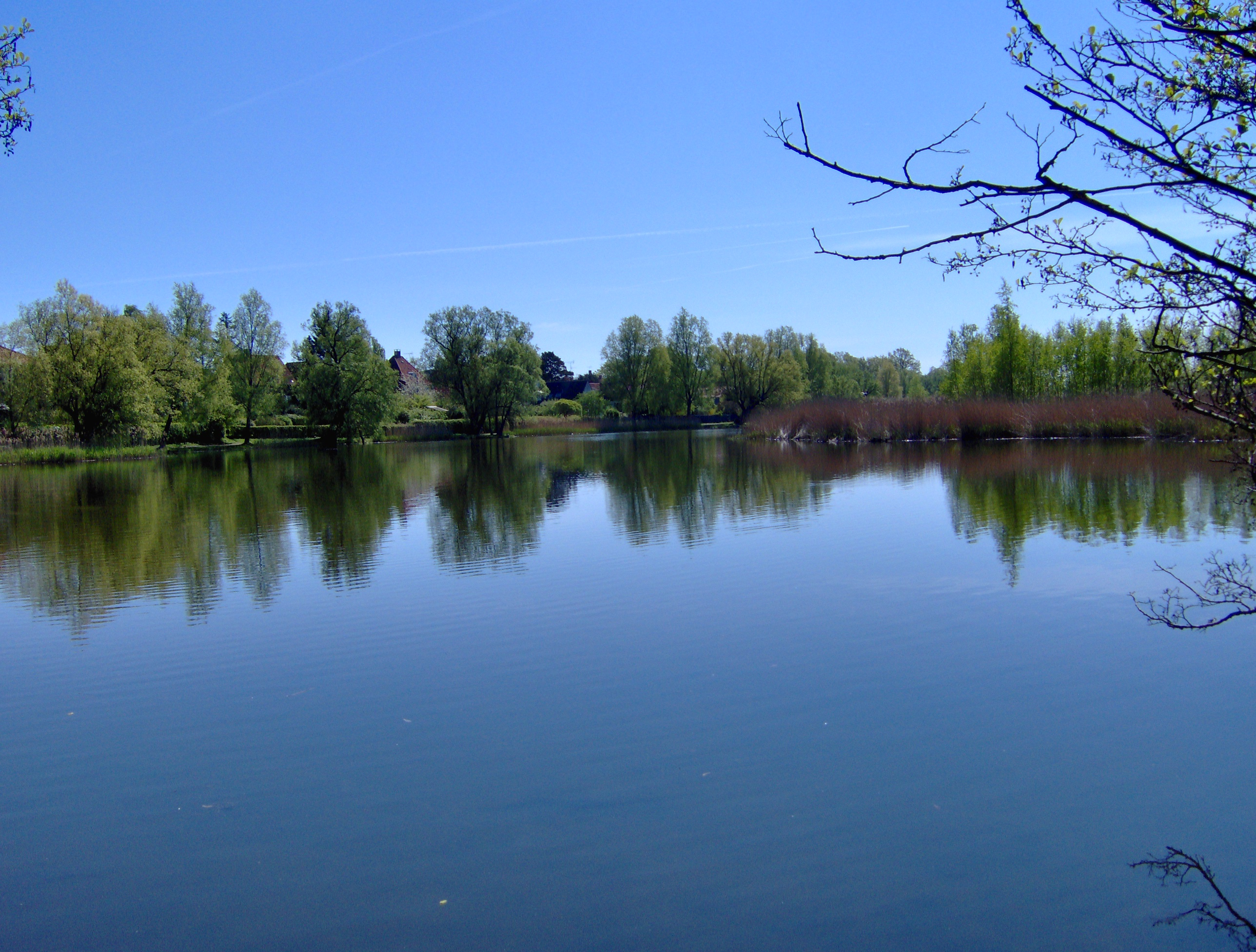
View over Gentofte Lake

The most important parks are Charlottenlund Beach Park, Hellerup Beach Park, Bernstorff Park.

Natural habitats are found at Gentofte Sø, a huge lake with many birds on it, Ermelunden in Jægersborg and Gammelmose in Vangede, Øregård Park (or Øregård Museum's Garden) with a lake, benches and also a playground. A small section of Jægersborg Dyrehave also extends into the municipality, while the rest, including the Dyrehavsbakken fun fair, is in Lyngby-Taarbæk.

== Twin towns – sister cities ==
Gentofte is twinned with:

- Halmstad, Sweden
- Hanko, Finland
- Sermersooq, Greenland
- Stord, Norway

== See also ==
- Gentofte station
- Gentofte Hospital
- Steno Diabetes Center
- Kildeskovshallen
- Gentofte Town Hall
- Gentofte#Notable people
