= Gentofte Lake =

Lake in Copenhagen, Denmark

Gentofte Sø
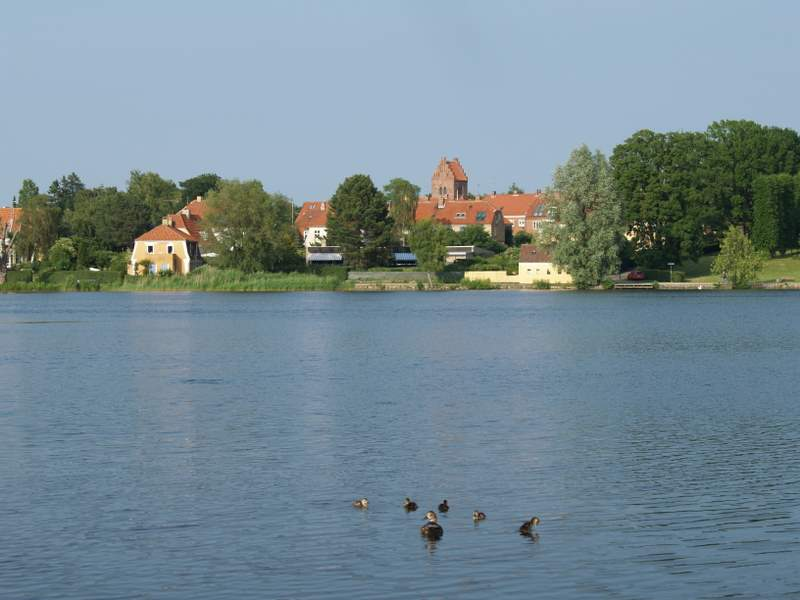
- Gentofte Lake viewed from the north

- Location within Denmark
- Location: Gentofte, Copenhagen
- Coordinates: 55°44′46″N 12°32′8″E
- Surface area: 36.73 hectares (90.8 acres)

Gentofte Lake (Danish: Gentofte Sø) is a lake in Gentofte in the northern suburbs of Copenhagen, Denmark. It has a surface area of 36.73 hectares. The Brobæk Mose bogland adjoins the lake to the northwest.

== History ==
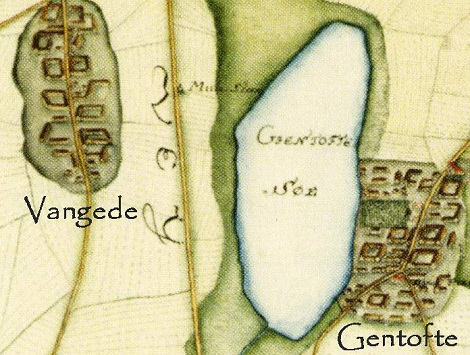
Map detail showing Gentofte Lake and the villages of Vangede and Gentofte

The original Gentofte was situated at the lake. Alexander Mitchell, a Scottish immigrant, established a hosiery factory at the lake in 1795. The lake was used in Copenhagen's water supply until 1959.

== The site ==
The neighbourhood at Mitchellsstræde is the remains of the so-called Bondeby. The oldest of the houses is from 1728. The yellow buildings located closest to the lake are the remains of Mitchell's stockings factory.
