= Michael Fenger =

Danish politician and former handball player (born 1962)

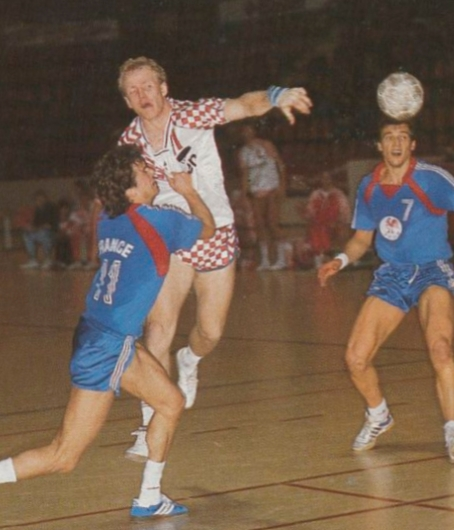
- Fenger on the handball court in 1988

Member of Gentofte Municipality council
- In office 2009–2021

Gentofte Municipality Mayor
- In office 2021–2025
- Preceded by: Hans Toft

Personal details
- Born: Peter Michael Fenger; August 8, 1962 (age 64) Frederiksberg, Denmark
- Party: Konservative Folkeparti
- Education: Cand.Polit
- Alma mater: University of Copenhagen
- Handball career
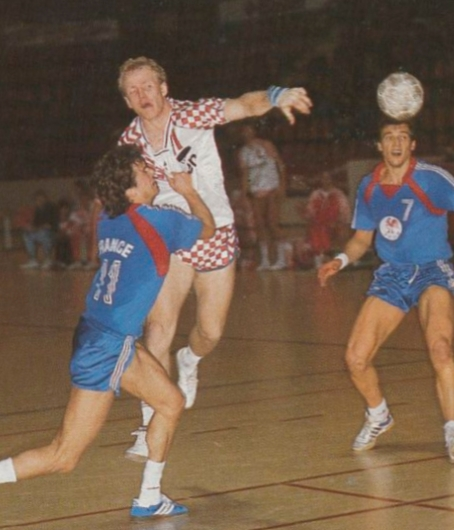
- Sport: Handball
- Position: Right wing

Senior clubs
- Years: Team
- –: HIK Håndbold
National team
Years	Team	Apps	(Gls)
1982-1993	Denmark	234	(541)

Teams managed
- –: HIK Håndbold
- 2004-2005: Denmark Assistant

Peter Michael Fenger (born 8 August 1962) is a Danish former handball player and politician, who competed in the 1984 Summer Olympics, where Denmark fininished 4th.

== Handball career ==
He played his club handball with HIK Håndbold. In 1986 he was named Danish handball player of the year. In 1984 he finished fourth with the Denmark men's national handball team in the 1984 Olympic tournament. He played five matches and scored seven goals. In total he played 234 matches for the Danish national team between 1982 and 1993.

Later he became the coach for HIK, first as the coach of the 1st team, and later as a youth coach. From 2004 to 2005 he was the assistant coach at the Danish national team.

== Political career ==
In 2009 he was elected for the Municipal council at Gentofte Municipality, representing Konservative Folkeparti. He was reelected in 2013 and 2017.

In 2021, he became mayor of Gentofte Municipality representing Konservative Folkeparti, replacing Hans Toft who had been the major of Gentofte for 28 years. Fenger got 8,997 personal votes, and with 12 Conservative seats, they held an absolute majority.
