= 317 (disambiguation) =

317 may refer to:

- 317, a year
- 317 BC, a calendar year
- 317 (number), a natural number

== Military ==
- 317th Operations Group, a military unit
- 317th Airlift Wing, a military unit
- 317th Airlift Squadron, a military unit
- 317th Fighter-Interceptor Squadron, a military unit
- 317th Infantry Regiment, a military unit
- 317th Rifle Division (Soviet Union), a military unit

== Weapons ==
- Smith & Wesson Model 317 kit gun, a kit gun
- ET.317, a thermonuclear weapon

== Places ==
- Texas State Highway 317, a highway in Texas
- Minnesota State Highway 317, a highway in Minnesota
- Ohio State Route 317, a state highway in Ohio
- Georgia State Route 317, a state highway in Georgia
- Tennessee State Route 317, a state highway in Tennessee.
- Nevada State Route 317, a state highway in Nevada
- New Mexico State Road 317, a state highway in New Mexico
- Pennsylvania Route 317, a state highway in Pennsylvania
- Connecticut Route 317, a state highway in Connecticut
- Colorado State Highway 317, a state highway in Colorado
- Kentucky Route 317, a state highway in Kentucky
- Maryland Route 317, a state highway in Maryland
- Wyoming Highway 317, a state highway in Wyoming
- New York State Route 317, a state highway in New York
- National Route 317 (Costa Rica), a national road route in Costa Rica
- National Highway 317 (India) a national highway in India
- China National Highway 317, a national highway in China
- Japan National Route 317, a national highway in Japan
- Manitoba Provincial Road 317, a provincial road in the Interlake and Eastman regions
- Commonwealth Commuter Flight 317, a scheduled commuter flight from Pittsburgh, Pennsylvania, to Johnstown, Pennsylvania.
- Rural Municipality of Marriott No. 317, a rural municipality

== Vehicles ==
- German submarine U-317, a Type VIIC/41 U-boat
- USS LST-317, a tank landing ship
- Soviet submarine Shch-317, a Shchuka-class submarine

== Science ==
- 317 Roxane, an asteroid in the asteroid belt
- Gliese 317 b, an extrasolar planet
- Gliese 317 c, a small red dwarf star
- WD 0032−317, a low mass white dwarf star
- NGC 317 a pair of interacting galaxies

== Others ==
- UFC 317, a mixed martial arts event
- Lectionary 317, a Greek manuscript of the New Testament
- Minuscule 317, a Greek minuscule manuscript of the New Testament
- Constituency W-317, a reserved Constituency
- 317a and 317b mummies, the remains of two infant daughters of Tutankhamun

== See also ==
- 3170 (disambiguation)
- List of United States Supreme Court cases, volume 317, a list of all the United States Supreme Court
