= Bellavista housing estate =

Housing estate in Copenhagen, Denmark

Coordinates: 55°46′34″N 12°35′25″E

Bellavista
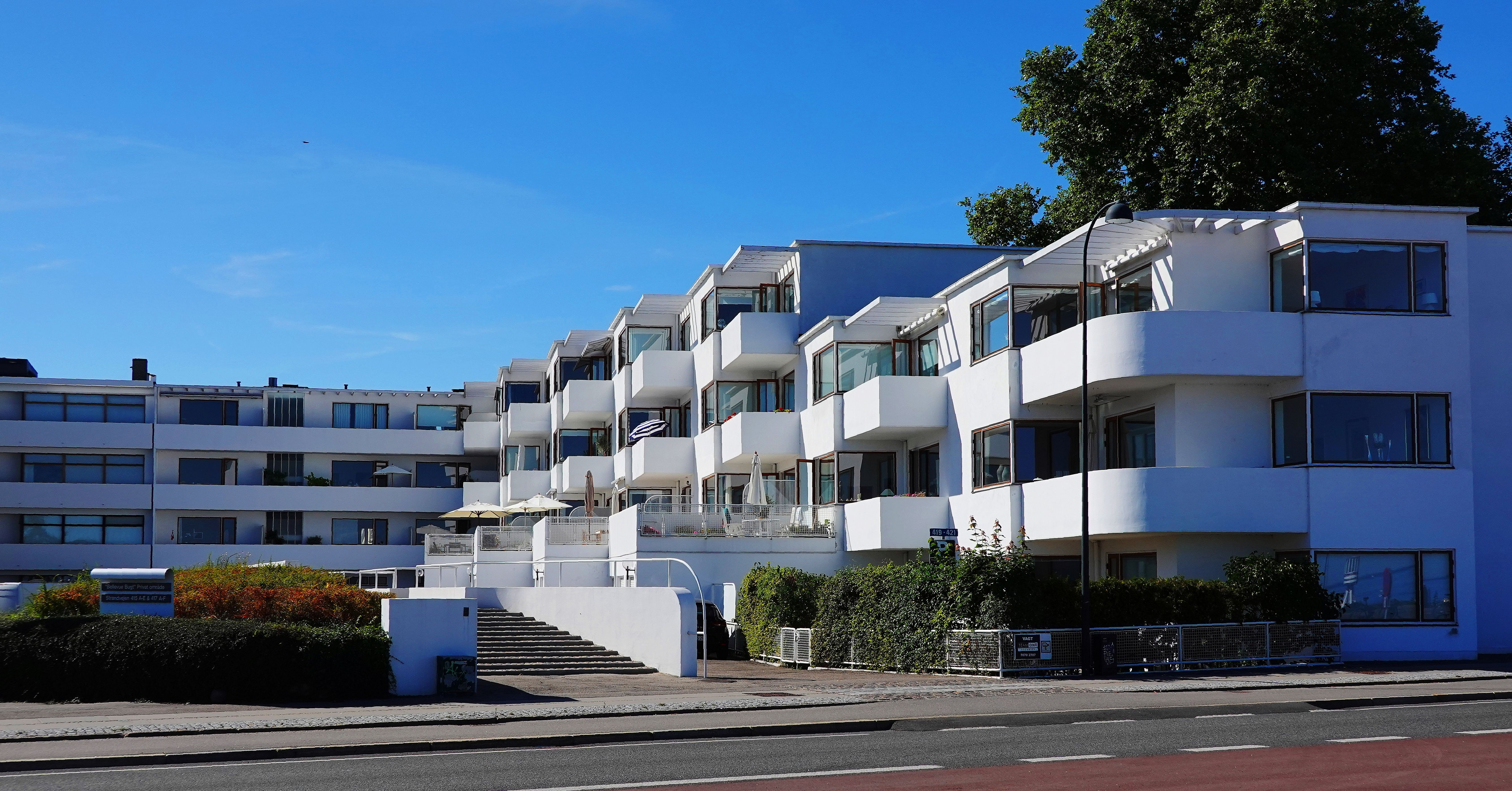
- Bellavista in 2022.
- Interactive map of the Bellavista area

General information
- Architectural style: Functionalism (architecture)
- Location: Gentofte Municipality, Copenhagen, Denmark
- Completed: 1934

Design and construction
- Architect: Arne Jacobsen

The Bellavista housing estate designed by Arne Jacobsen is the clearest example of Bauhaus architecture in Denmark. Completed in 1934, the estate is located just north of Copenhagen, in Klampenborg, Gentofte Municipality, next to Jacobsen's Bellevue Beach, which had been completed a couple of years earlier.

== Background ==
While still a student, Jacobsen travelled to Germany where he was attracted by the Modernist architecture of Mies van der Rohe and Walter Gropius, both pioneers of the Bauhaus school. This encouraged him to collaborate with his old friend Flemming Lassen in designing the "House of the Future" which won the Danish Architects Association's competition in 1929. In 1930, Jacobsen designed the Functionalist, white-plastered Rothenborg House on Klampenborgvej in Klampenborg, planned and furnished as a total work of art. The building was warmly received, not only by the Danish press but by its occupants.

Shortly after he had completed the Bellevue Beach bathing centre, Jacobsen received a commission from Gentofte Municipality to build an apartment complex in the same area. It was specified that the buildings should have flat roofs, that they should not have more than three storeys, and that those facing the coast road and the sea beyond should not be more than two storeys high. Jacobsen decided to construct his 68 modern, well-fitted apartments in a U-shaped configuration consisting of three wings overlooking a central lawn. The name Bellavista stemmed from the Bella Vista villa which had previously stood on the site. The Bellavista development has been listed since 1987.

== Architecture ==
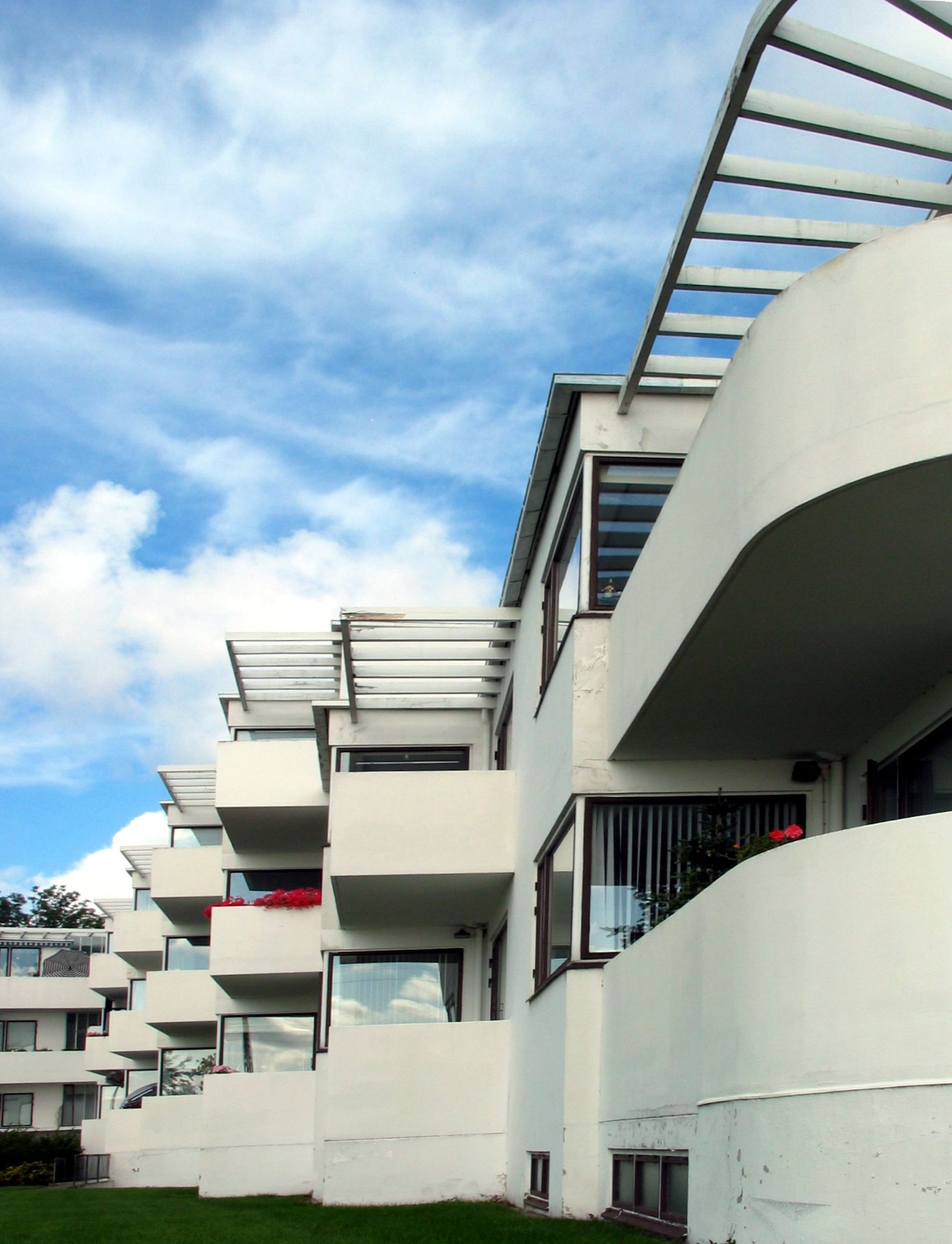
Rounded corners: a special feature

The buildings are built of brick with a whitewashed finish and iron girders between the floors. The roofs are tar-papered, the window frames are teak and the balconies have reinforced concrete fencing. In order to take full advantage of the sea view, Jacobsen staggered the facades of the north and south wings so that each apartment has two rooms with views over the sea. The sea can also be seen from the balconies which are integrated into the structure of the buildings rather than protruding outwards as was the usual practice at the time. The south wing which stands on lower ground has a basement with garages. The largest apartments are those in the west wing, behind the two others and parallel to the coast road, where there is no requirement for a staggered facade. A few shops were also included in the complex. Jacobsen succeeded in creating interesting effects with his floor displacements, rounded corners, and the latticework over the balconies. The shadows over the white surface of the buildings create ever changing impressions as the day progresses. With their white-washed facades and corner windows, the buildings instill an atmosphere of exotic, elegant modernity, so typical of Functionalism. Bellavista allowed Jacobsen to realize his dream of a modern town.

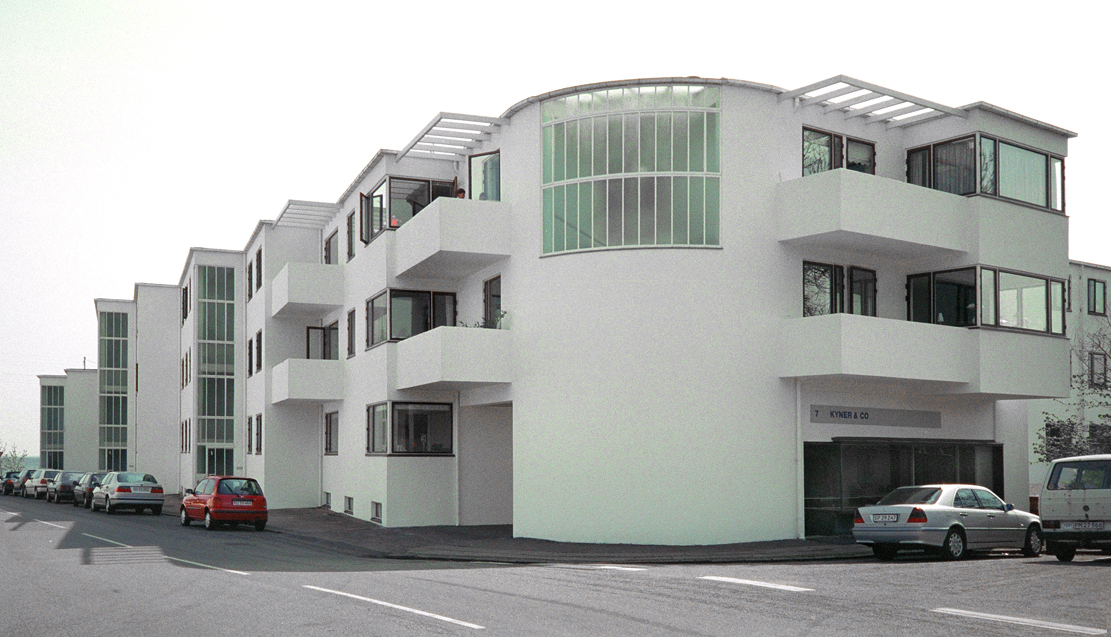

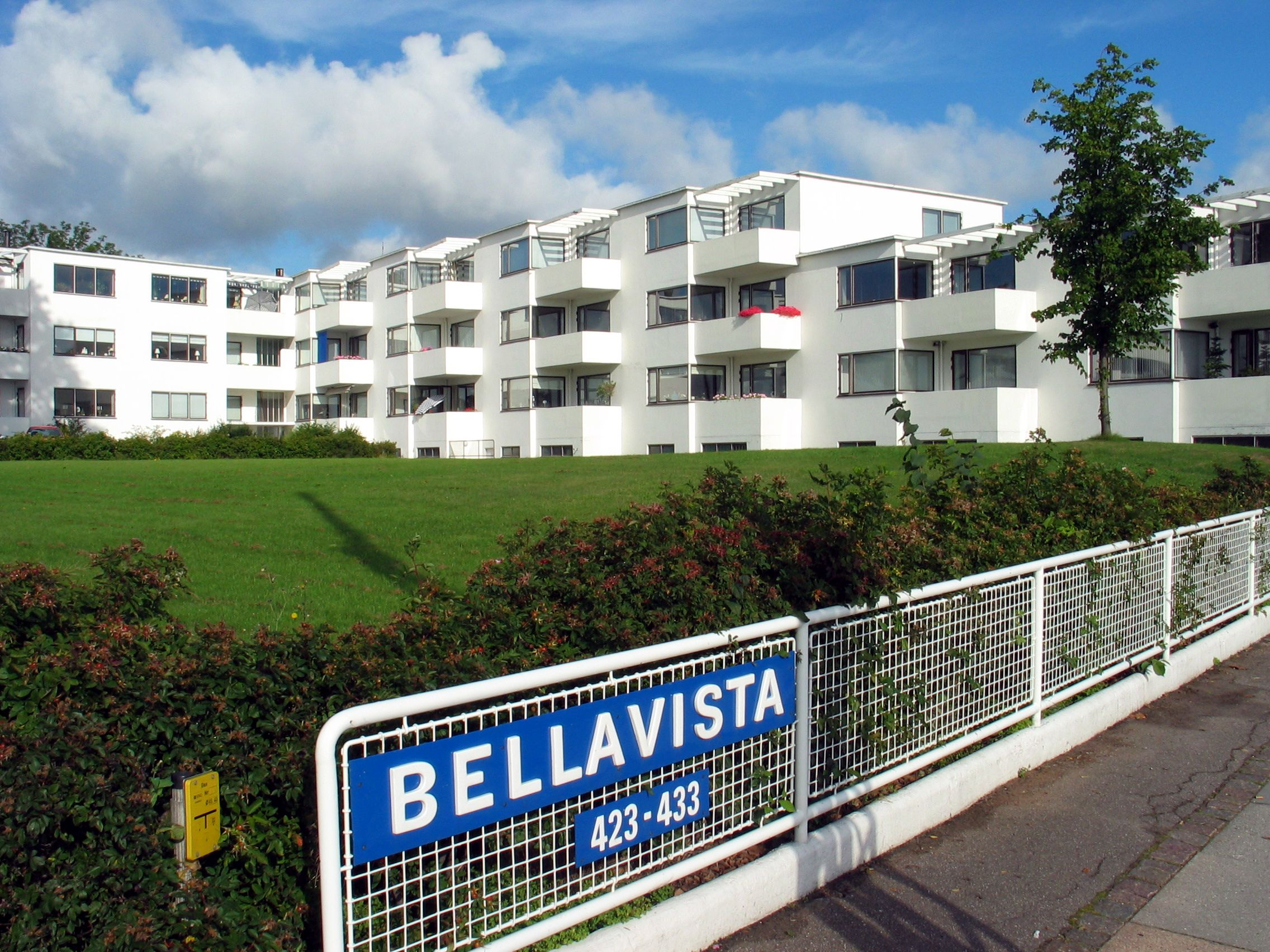

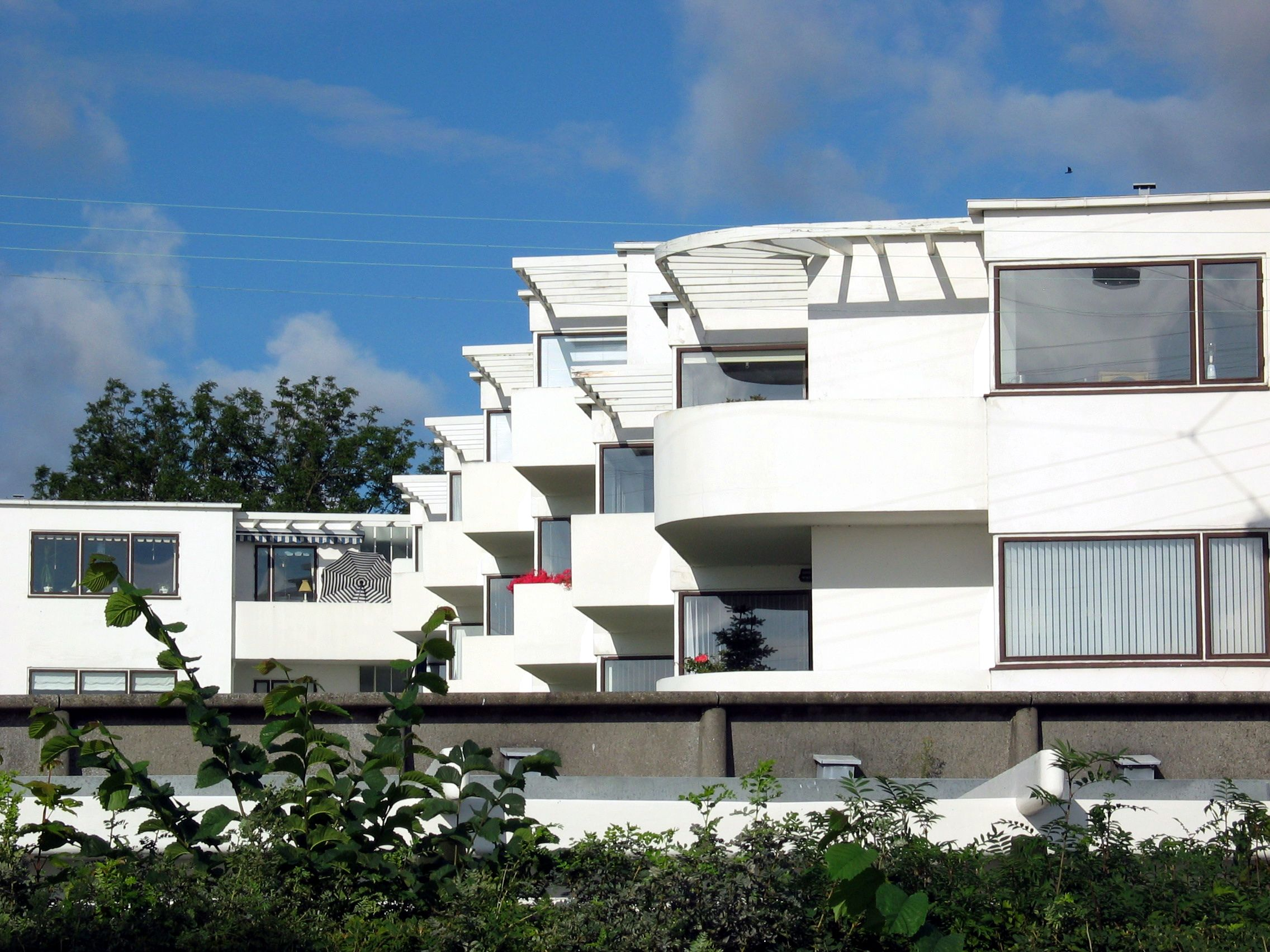

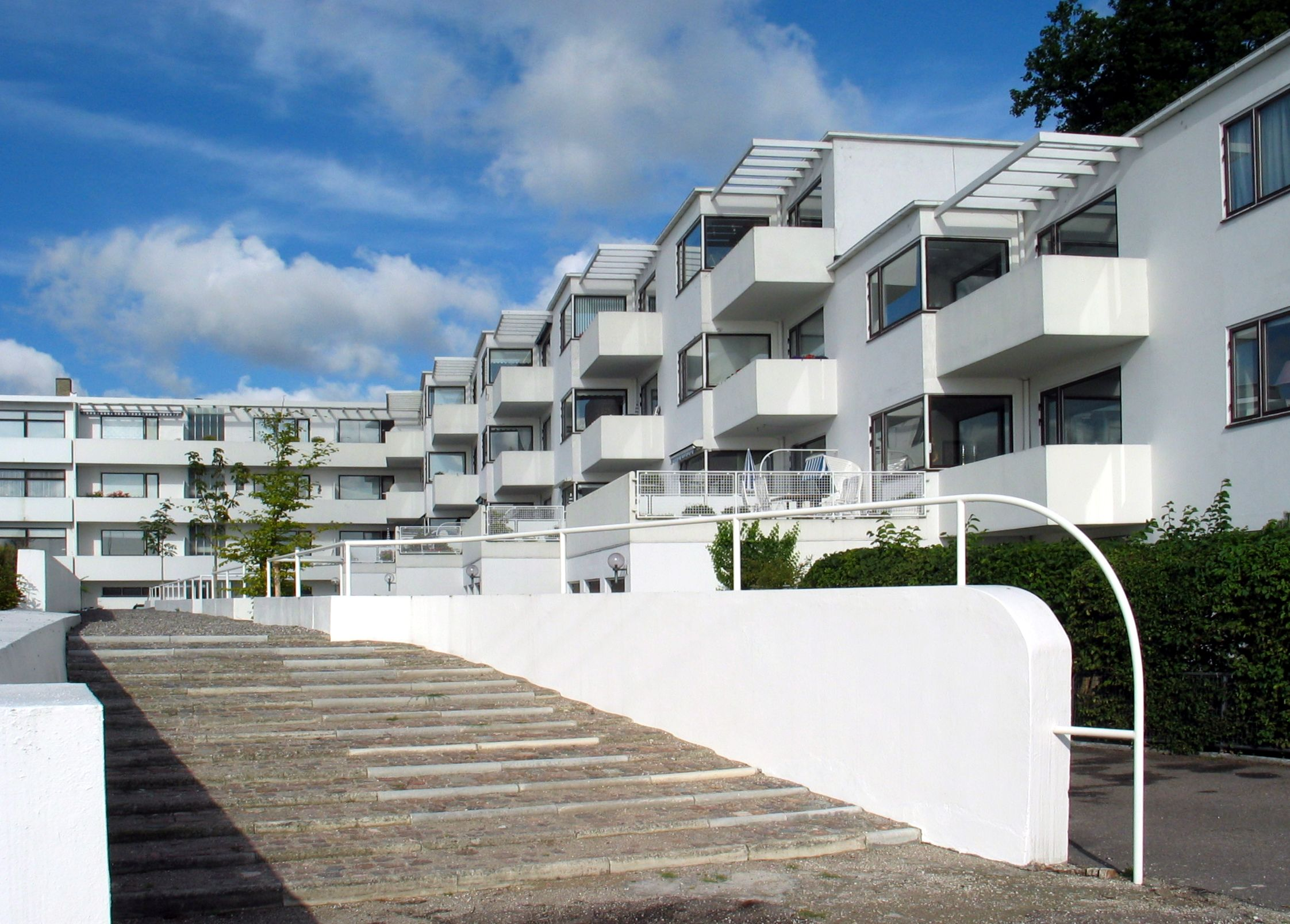

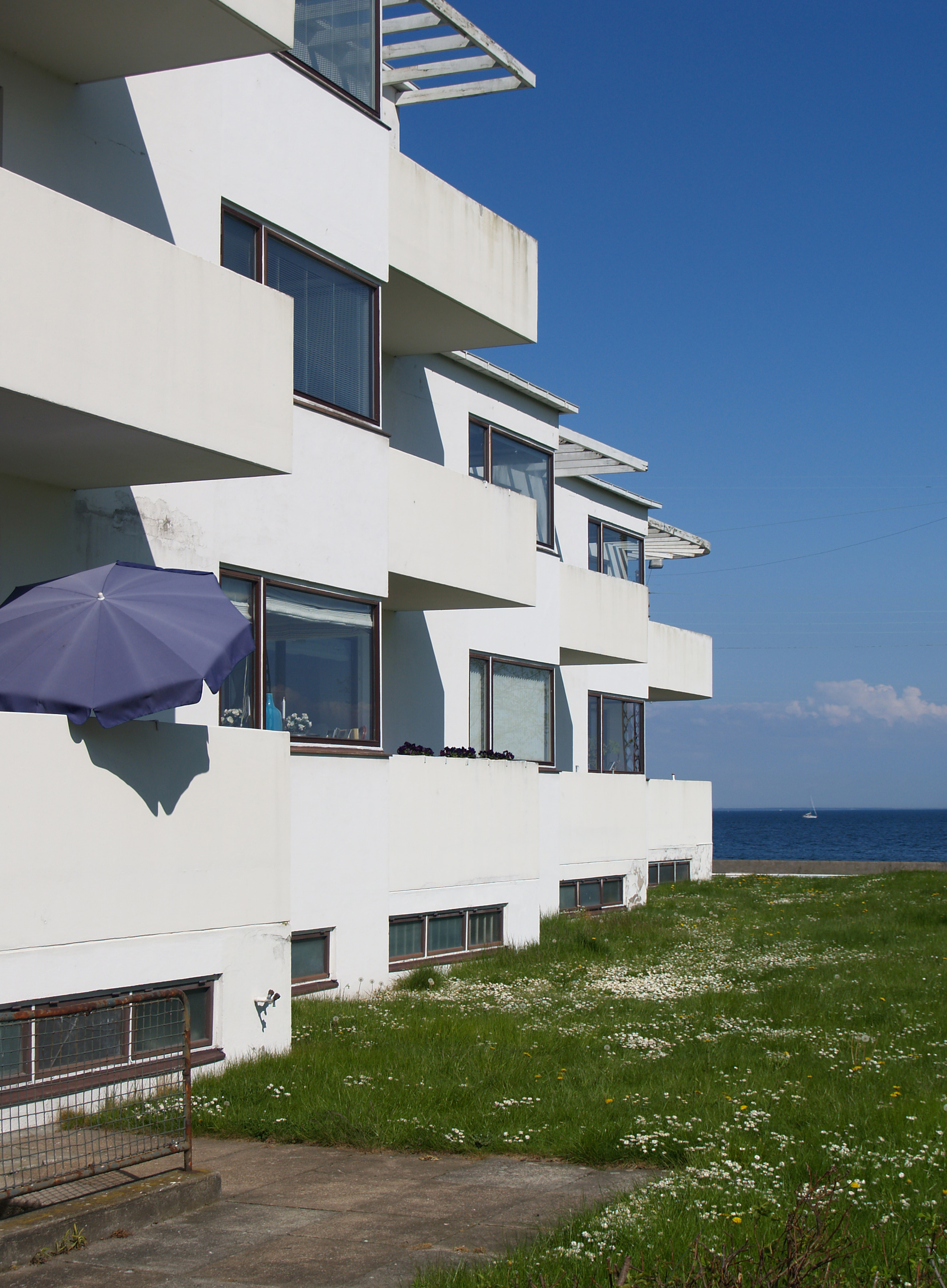

== Neighbouring Jacobsen works ==
In the immediate vicinity of the Bellavista estate, Jacobsen also designed the Bellevue Theatre and what is now called Restaurant Jacobsen which also functions as a small Arne Jacobsen museum. Jacobsen's Skovshoved Filling Station, with its unique mushroom-like canopy, is located on the coast road some 2 km to the south. All three date from 1936. Mattsson's Riding Hall (Danish: Mattssons Ridehal) is a whitewashed, reinforced-concrete riding arena near Klampenborg Station behind the estate. In 1934, at the request of its owner, Axel Mattsson, Jacobsen transformed older buildings into a luxurious riding centre better suited to its demanding clientele. After the war, Jacobsen designed the Søholm terraced houses located some 400 metres to the south of Bellavista. He lived and worked in the house closest to the sea (Strandvejen 413) from 1951 until his death in 1971.

== Assessment ==
In "Design 1935-1965, What Modern was", R. Craig Miller notes that Jacobsen’s work "is an important and original contribution both to modernism and to the specific place Denmark and the Scandinavian countries have in the modern movement. One might in fact argue that much of what the modern movement stands for, would have been lost and simply forgotten if Scandinavian designers and architects like Arne Jacobsen would not have added that humane element to it."

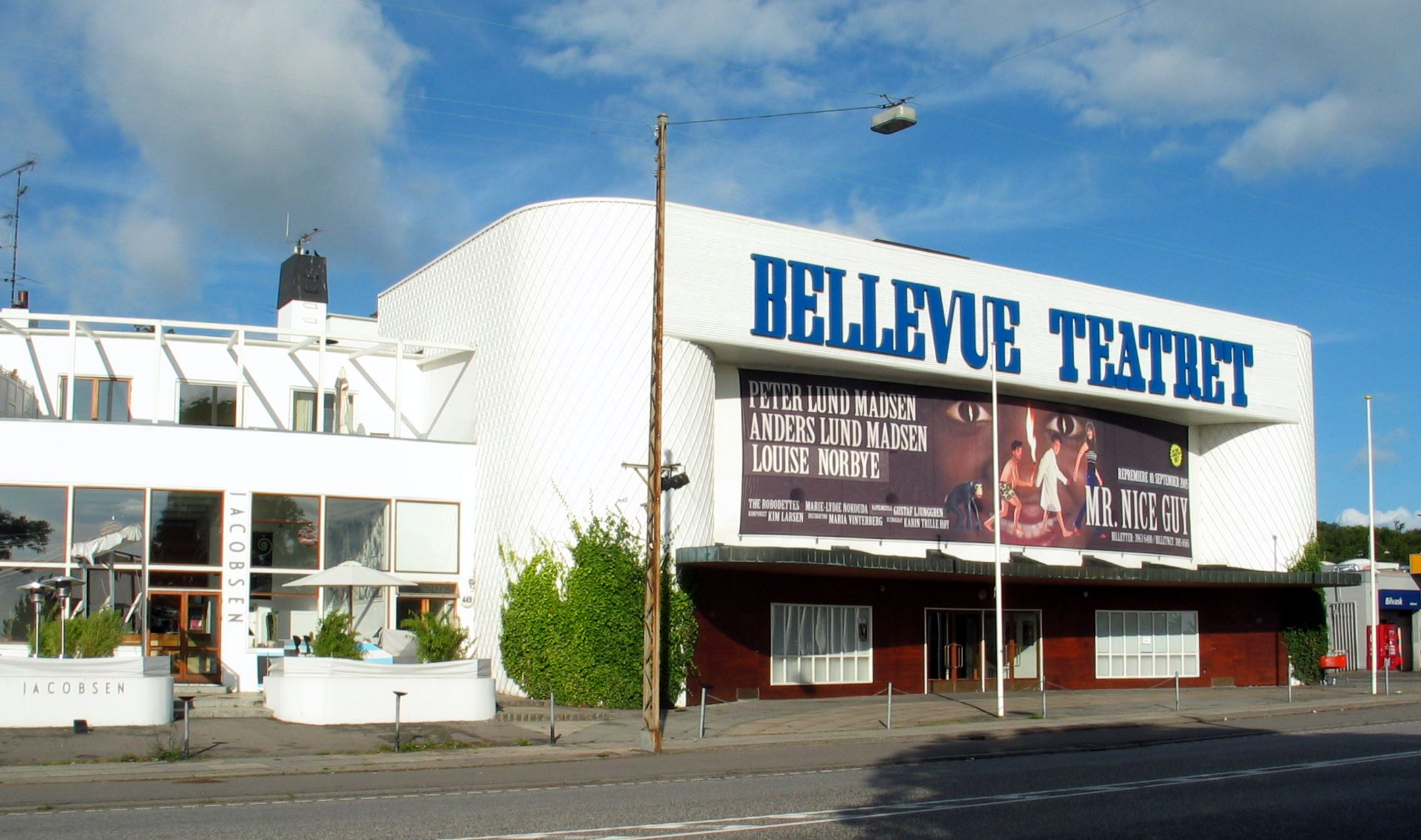
Restaurant Jacobsen and Bellevue Theatre (1936)

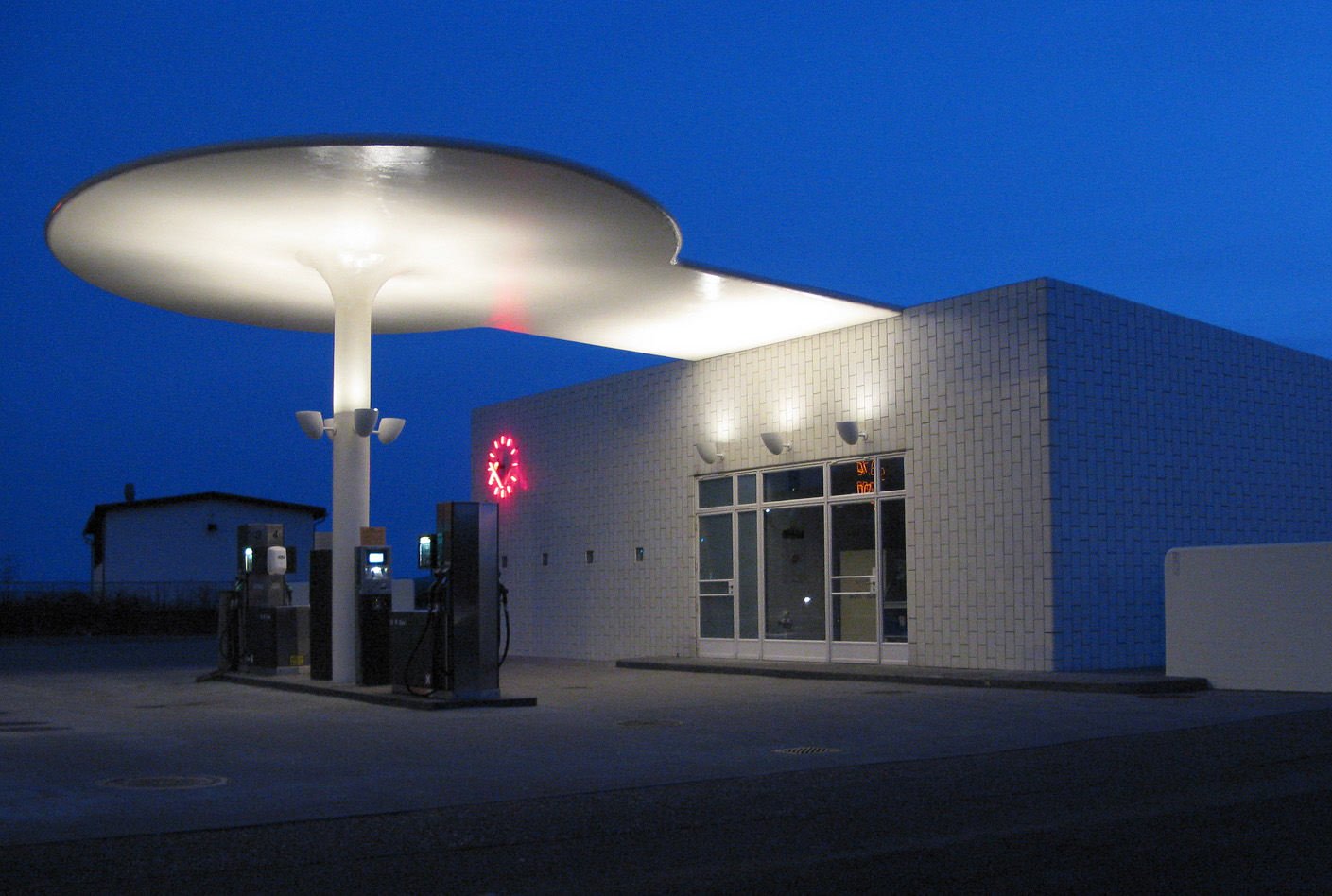
Skovshoved Filling Station (1936)

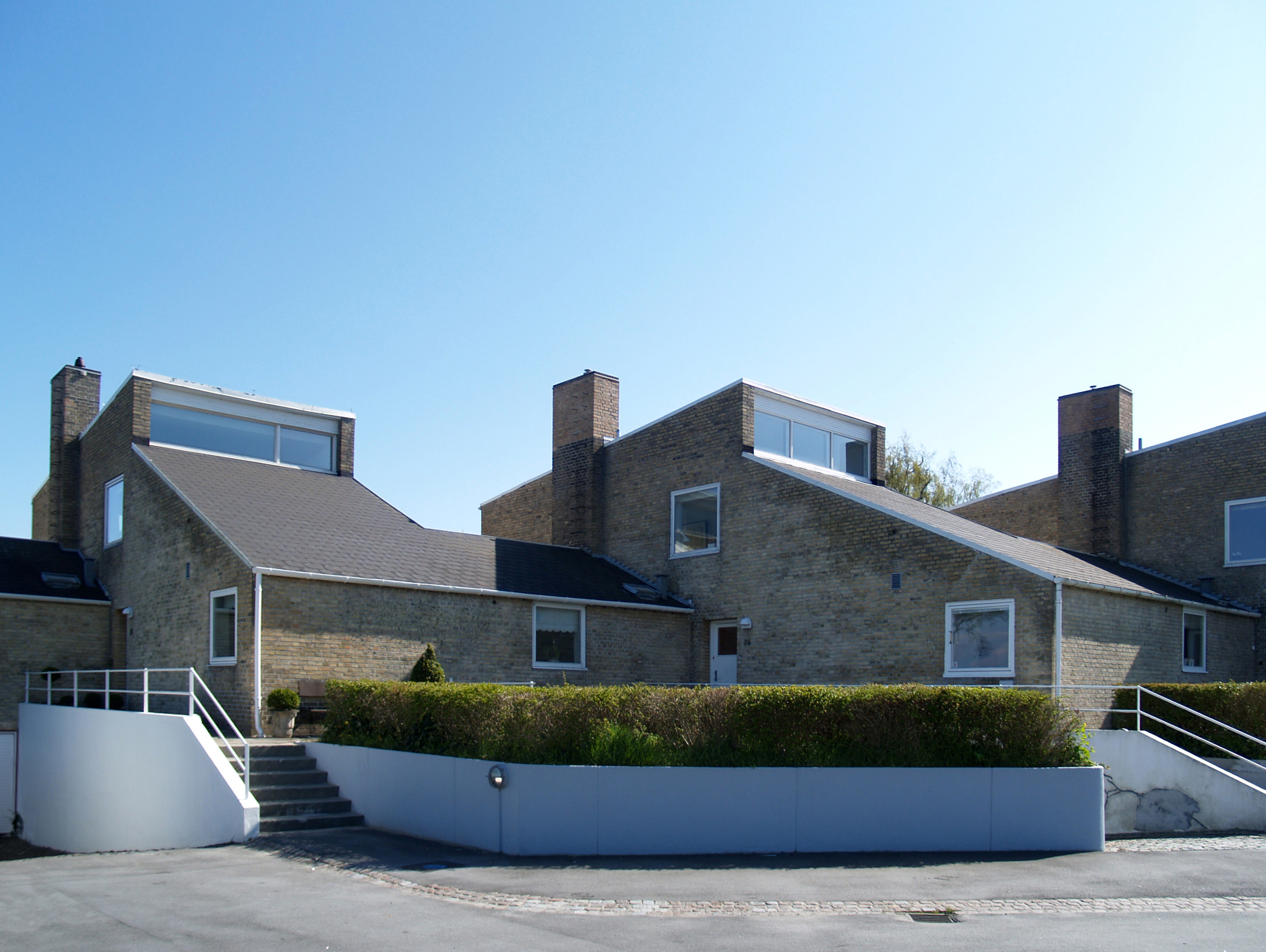
Søholm terraced houses (1950)

== Literature ==
- Thau, Carsten; Vindum, Kjeld: Arne Jacobsen, 2008, Copenhagen, Arkitektens forlag, 560 p. ISBN 978-87-7407-230-0
