= Tongue chair =

Chair designed by Arne Jacobsen

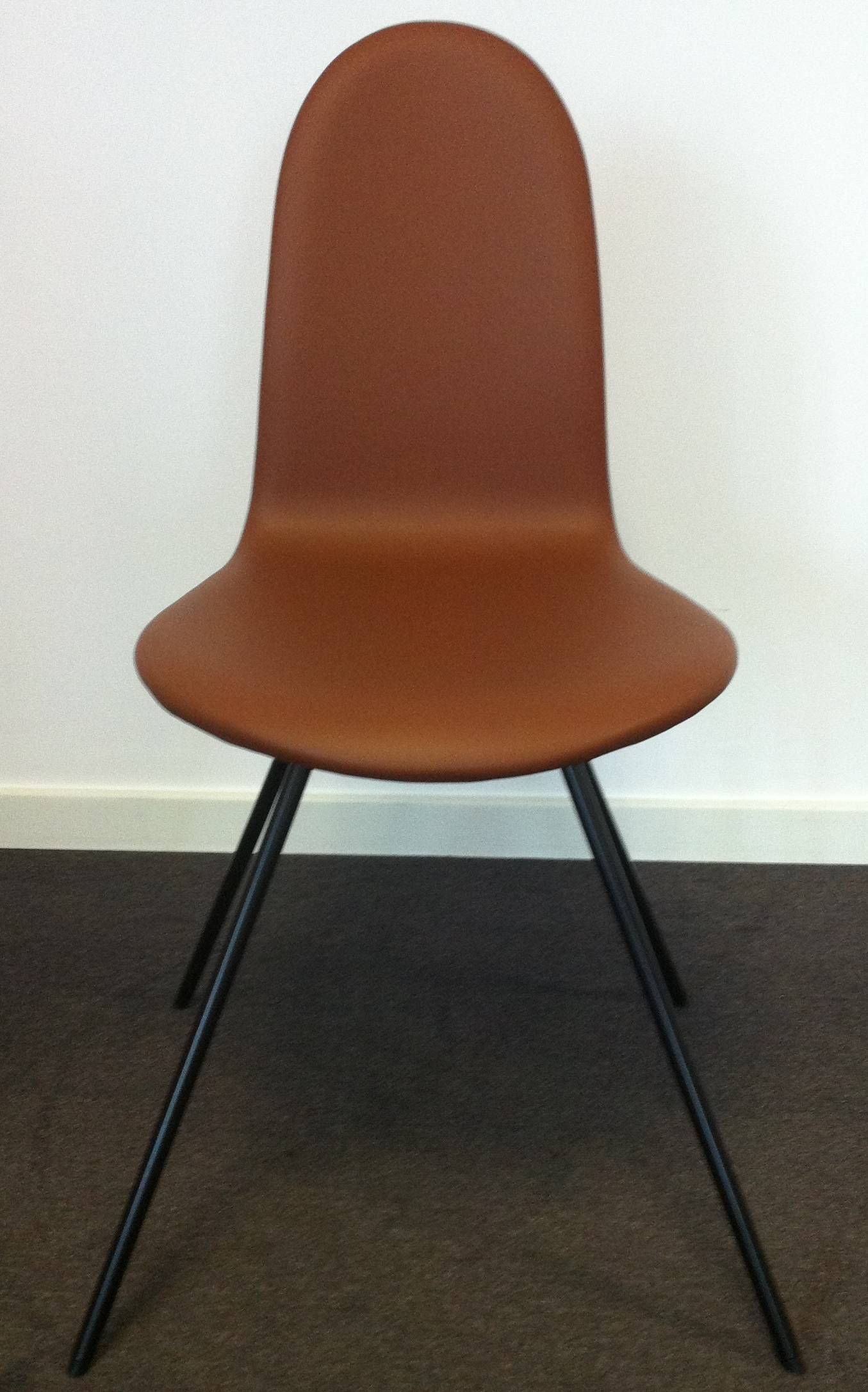
- The Tongue Chair in leather cover
- Designer: Arne Jacobsen
- Date: 1955
- Materials: Chrome/ powder coated steel frame; fabric/ veneer/ leather cover
- Style / tradition: Modernist
- Sold by: HOWE A/S (Denmark)

The Tongue Chair is a classic chair designed by Arne Jacobsen in 1955 for Munkegaard School in Denmark. The Tongue is a typical piece of Arne Jacobsen's style and his second completed chair design, which was created just after the Ant.

The Tongue was later placed at the Royal Hotel in Copenhagen; however, it was not available internationally until the 1980s (for a short time only), and even after that, it could not find a place in the market.

The Tongue chair is now back in the design and furniture industry and is restored to its original design by Danish contract furniture manufacturer Howe.
