= 3170 =

3170 may refer to:

== In general ==
- A.D. 3170, a year in the 4th millennium CE
- 3170 BC, a year in the 4th millennium BCE
- 3170, a number in the 3000 (number) range

== Places ==
- 3170 Dzhanibekov, an asteroid in the Asteroid Belt, the 3170th asteroid registered
- Hawaii Route 3170, a state highway
- Louisiana Highway 3170, a state highway
- Texas Farm to Market Road 3170, a state highway

== Other uses ==
- Model 3170 DOT stool
- 3170th Special Weapons Group, of the U.S. Air Force

== See also ==
- Lima-Hamilton A-3170, a diesel locomotive
