= Bellevue Teatret =

Theatre in Klampenborg, Denmark

Coordinates: 55°46′39.2″N 12°35′23.7″E

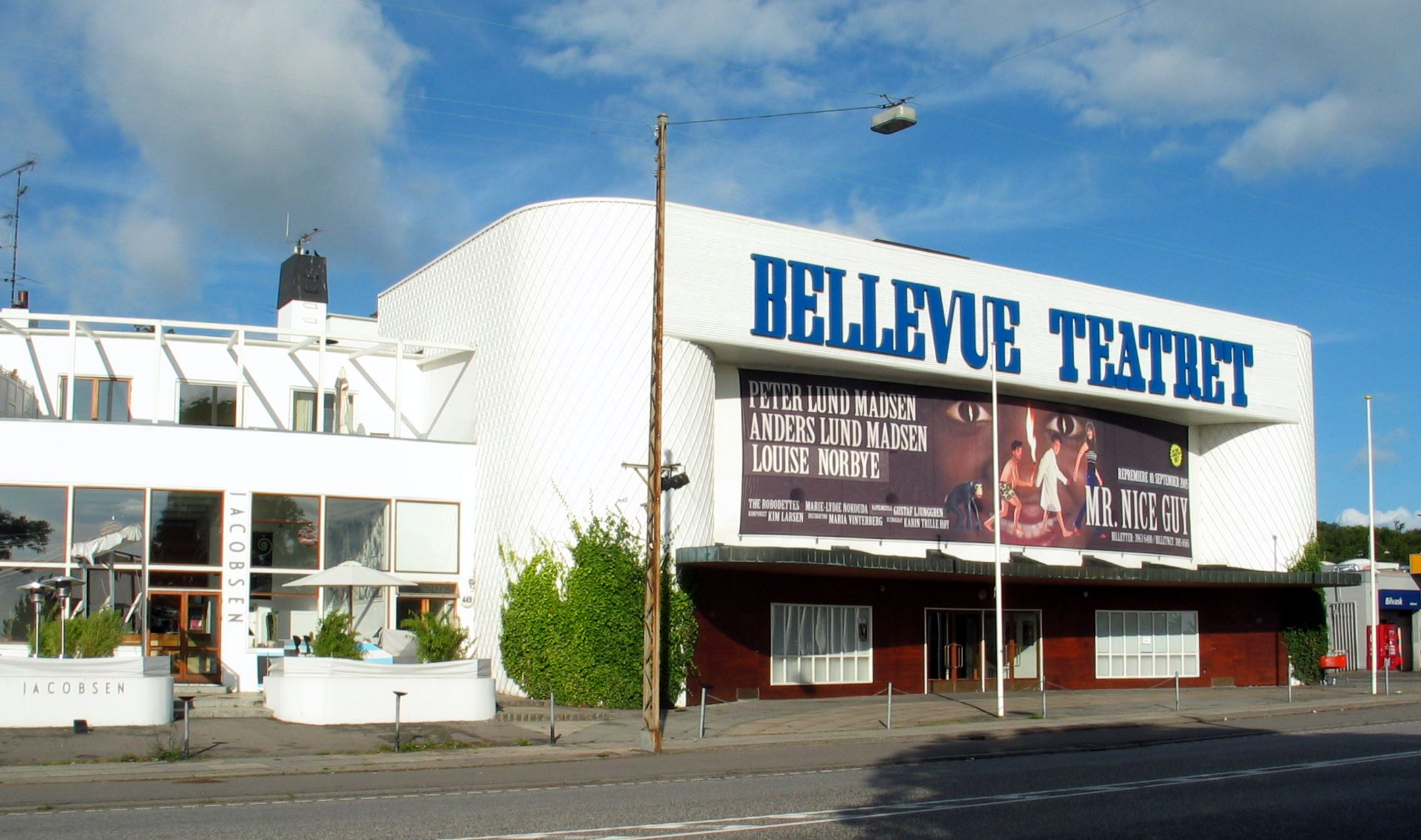
- The facade
- Interactive map of Bellevue Teatret
- Address: Strandvejen 451, Klampenborg; Copenhagen; Denmark
- Capacity: 700

Construction
- Opened: 1936
- Closed: 1939-1980
- Architect: Arne Jacobsen

Website
- www.bellevueteatret.dk

The Bellevue Teatret (English: Bellevue Theatre) is a theatre in Klampenborg at the northern outskirts of Copenhagen, Denmark. Opened in 1936 to the design of Arne Jacobsen, the building is considered one of his most important architectural works and exemplar of Danish functionalism. The theatre is part of a scheme also including the adjoining Bellevue Beach and residential block and was, at the time, seen as a manifestation of "the dream of the modern lifestyle".

== History ==
In the early 1930s, Arne Jacobsen won a competition for a masterplan for the Bellevue area in Klampenborg, Gentofte Municipality, shortly after opening his own architectural office in 1930. The Bellevue Teatret was the last stage of this scheme, which also included facilities for the local Bellevue Sea Bath and the Bellavista residential buildings. The theatre opened in 1936 as a mondain summer theatre. It closed a few seasons later, then operating as a cinema until 1980, when it was reopened as a theatre and film centre by Jes Kølpin.

== Building ==
The building is considered one of the most important architectural work by Arne Jacobsen, exemplar of early Danish functionalism. The inside has mosaic decorations and is noted for the retractable roof. Walls, balcony and proscenium are clad in canvas and bamboo. The front curtain shows a beach girl, painted by Åge Sikker Hansen.

== Repertoire ==
Since the reopening as a theatre, the repertoire has been dominated by modern music performances, particularly rock musicals.

An annual tradition is a Summer Ballet. Until the 2008 season produced in cooperation with Copenhagen International Ballet, it is now made in produced in cooperation with Tim Rushton and Danish Dance Theatre.

== Bibliography ==
- Strømberg, Ulla: Bellevue Teatret. Arkitektur og teater i Arne Jacobsens bygningsværk. Forlaget Bogvaerket.dk
