= Bellevue Beach =

Beach in Copenhagen, Denmark

Coordinates: 55.7780°N 12.5923°E

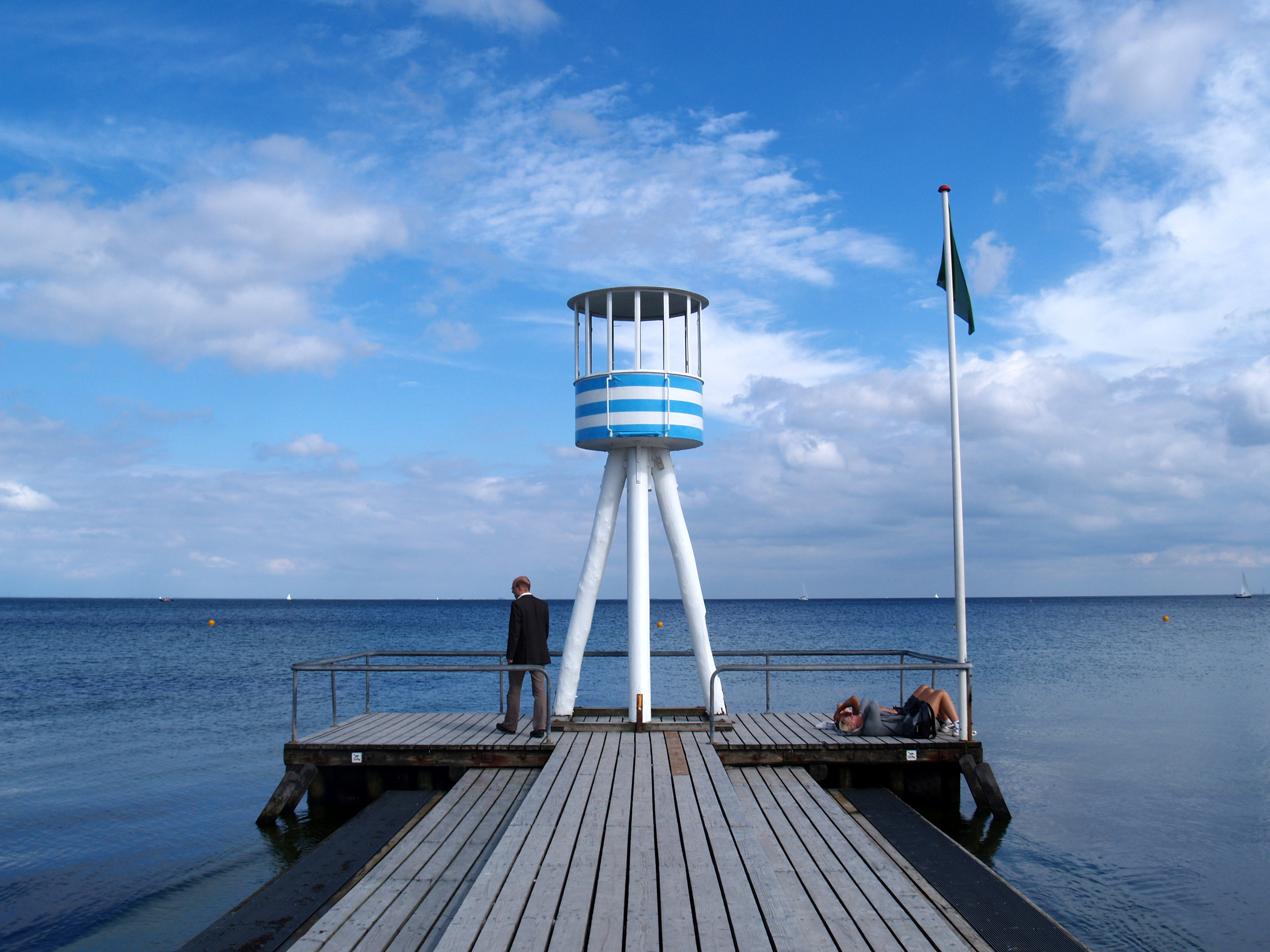
One of Arne Jacobsen's characteristic lifeguard towers

Bellevue Beach (Danish: Bellevue Strand), often simply referred to as Bellevue, is a beach at Klampenborg on the northern outskirts of Copenhagen, Denmark. With up to 500,000 visitors a year, it is one of the most popular beaches in the Copenhagen area, although it attracts somewhat fewer Copenhageners since the inauguration of the Amager Beach Park and the Copenhagen Harbour Baths in 2005.

Bellevue is a 700-metre-long sandy beach with adjoining lawns. The characteristic blue-striped, almost cartoonish, lifeguard towers and the geometric kiosks were designed by Danish architect and furniture designer Arne Jacobsen in 1932.

== History ==
In the 1930s, when the right to vacation became legally mandated, Denmark's coastline became the country's most popular holiday destination. Gentofte Municipality made plans to develop a piece of coastline north of Copenhagen into a seaside resort complex combining an existing park designed by the landscape architect C.Th. Sørensen with beach facilities catering to some 15,000 paying visitors a day. Three architects were invited to submit plans for a Bellevue beach complex. The winner was the young architect Arne Jacobsen, who had just opened his office. Characteristic of his approach to architecture and design—he was preoccupied with the concept of Gesamtkunst—Jacobsen designed everything from bathing cabins, lifeguard towers and kiosks to tickets and uniforms for the staff. The complex also included the Bellavista apartment buildings (1934), a restaurant and the Bellevue Theatre (1936), all of which still stand today in the immediate vicinity of the beach.

The quest for recreation by the growing masses called for physical as well as social solutions and change. A political initiative provided the pre-requisites for creating a beach at Bellevue. In June 1932 the Bellevue beach was inaugurated by Danish Prime Minister Thorvald Stauning. It immediately became the most popular summer resort in Copenhagen. A direct return tram ticket from the city to Bellevue, including the beach entrance fee, was at the affordable price of 30 øre (less than five cents).

== In popular culture ==
- In the song Hot, the second track on their debut album Nik & Jay, Danish Hip-Hop/pop duo Nik & Jay describe a drive up the coast from Copenhagen and the amazing sunset from Bellevue. However, situated on an east-facing coast, there is no sunset to be seen at that particular location.

== Image gallery ==
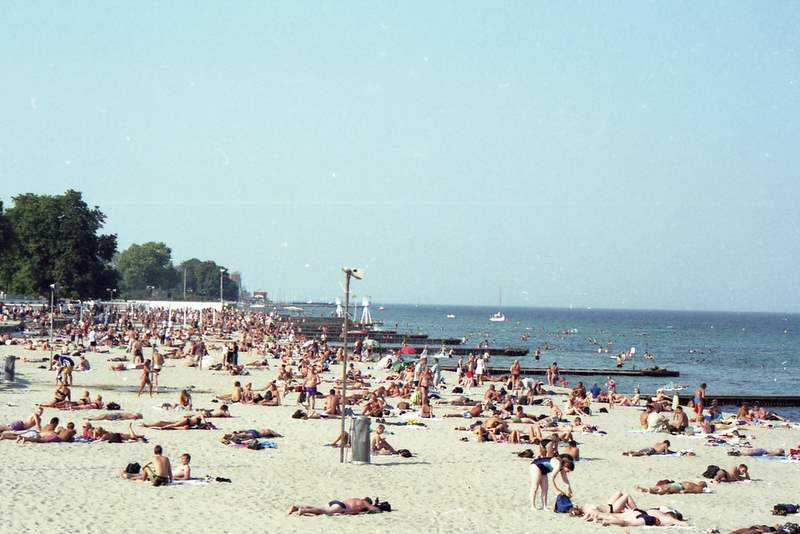

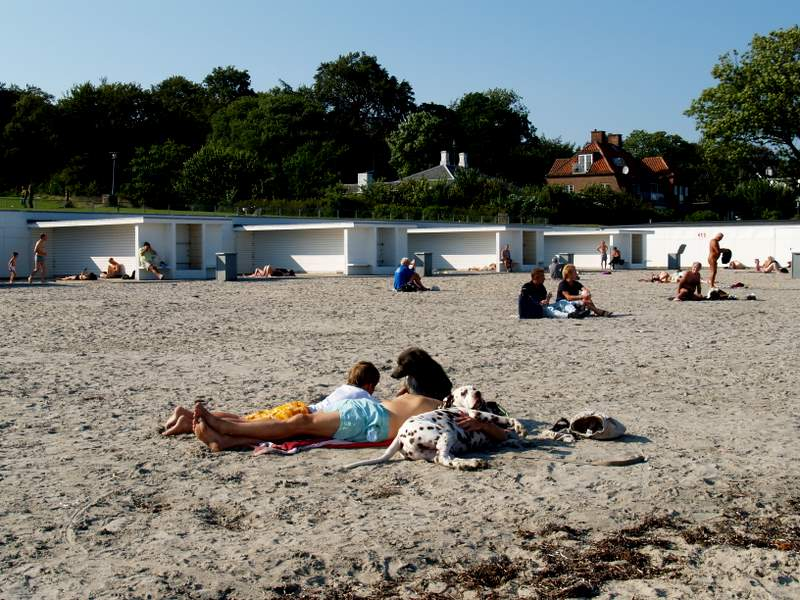
