= Munkegaard School =

School in Gentofte, Denmark

Coordinates: 55°44′07″N 12°31′19″E

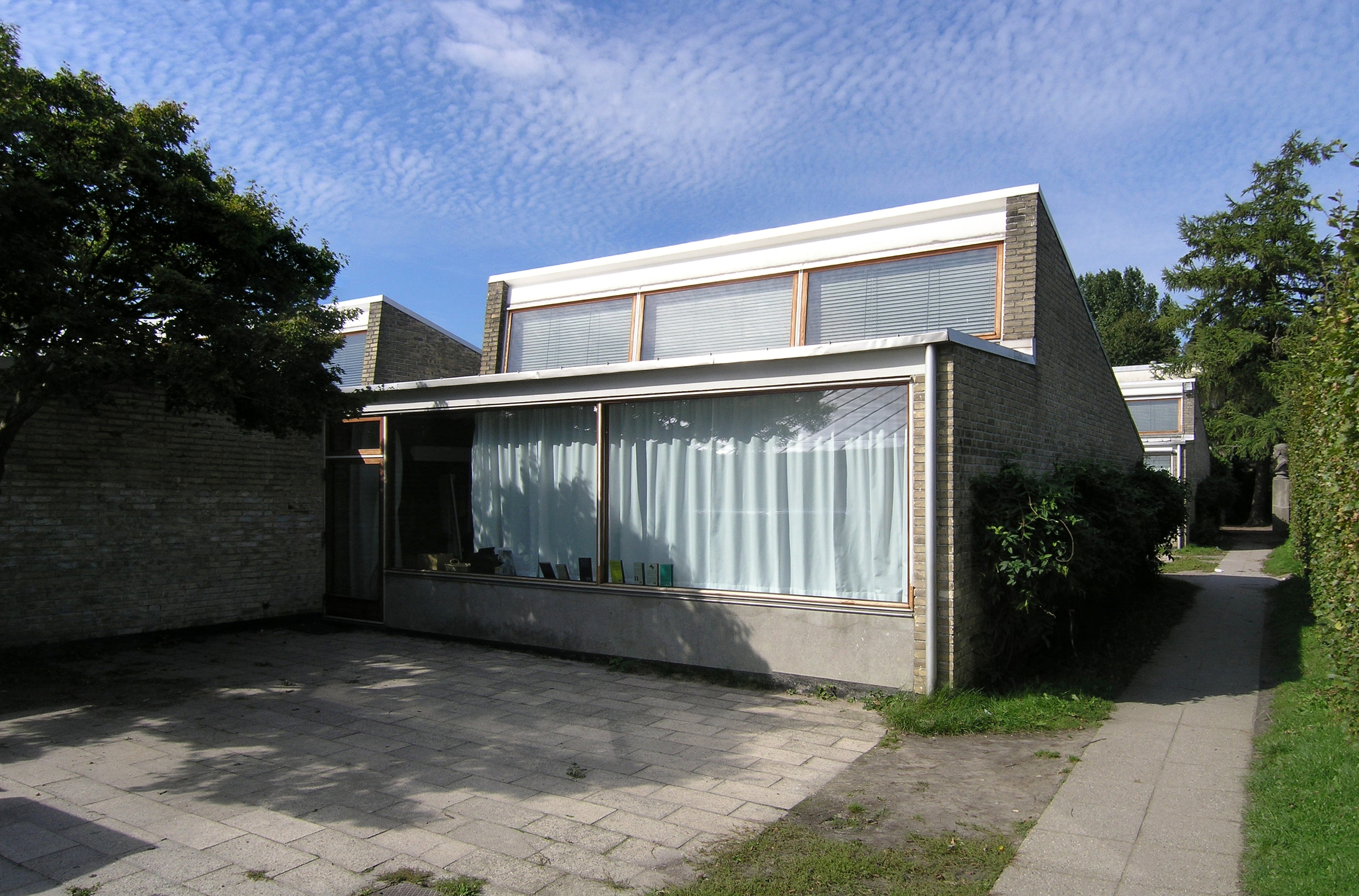
Munkegaard School

Munkegaard School (Danish: Munkegårdsskolen) is a school in Gentofte, just north of Copenhagen, designed by the Danish architect Arne Jacobsen and completed in 1957. The complex is considered to be one of Jacobsen's most important architectural works.

== Background ==
At the end of the 1940s and beginning of the 1950s, a considerable number of schools were built in Denmark. Special attention was given at the time to the need for the child's physical wellbeing, inspired in part by the English one-storey school buildings of the period. In 1949, Munkegaard School, was conceived as one of the first one-storey schools in Denmark. The overall idea was to build a complex for a large number of children which had all the advantages of a much smaller school. It was thought this could be achieved by dividing the complex into sets of two adjacent classrooms, each with its own courtyard or garden, in order to provide a feeling of intimacy and wellbeing.

== Architecture ==
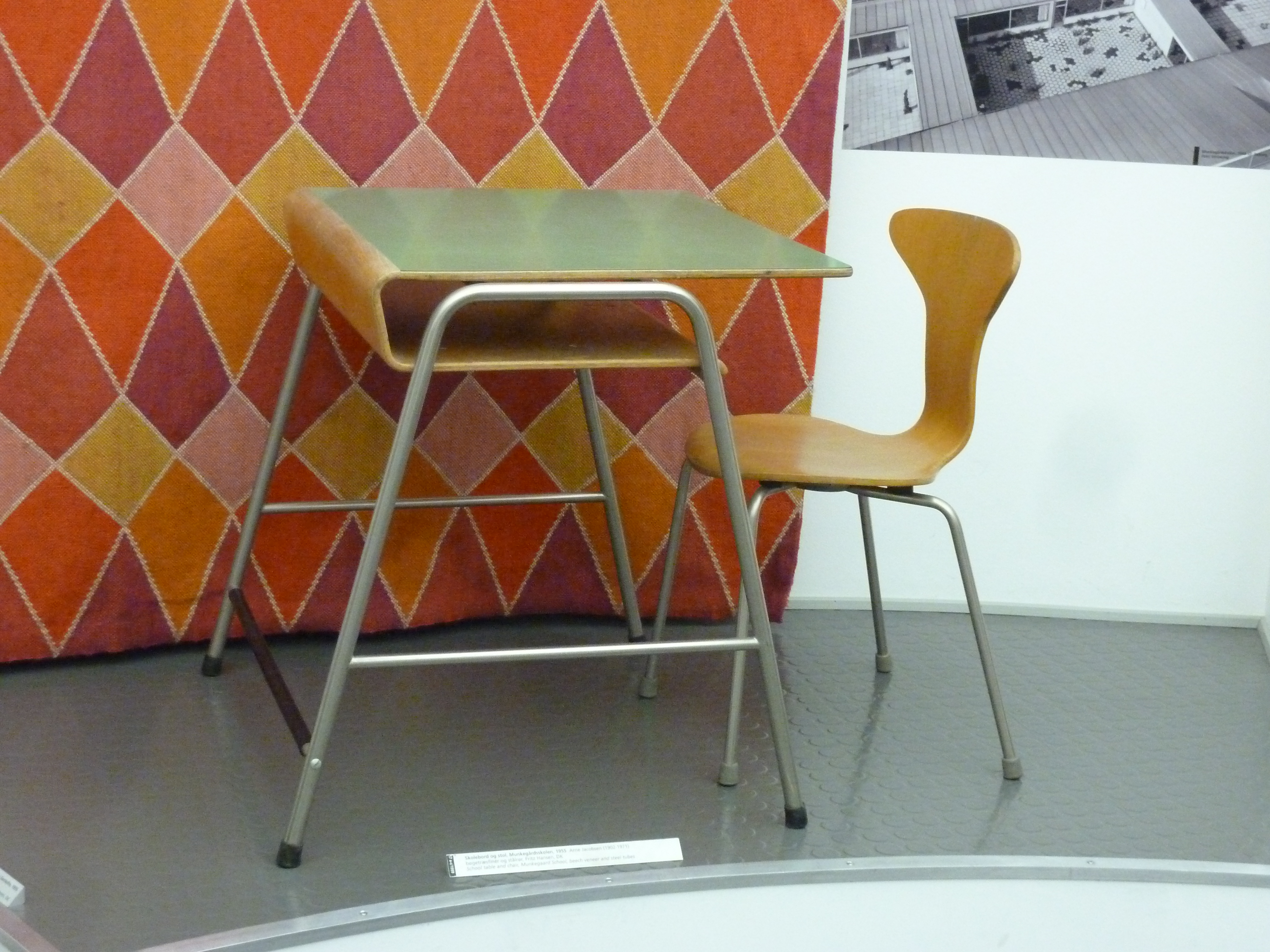
Desk designed by Arne Jacobsen

The yellow-brick complex consists of a rectangular grid of one-storey buildings linked together by transversal glass-walled corridors. Each of the 24 classrooms has direct access to one of the courtyards between the buildings. Science classrooms and specialist facilities, including a library, are located in a two-storey building on one side of the complex while a second two-storey building housing an assembly hall, offices and other facilities stands at the centre of the site. Steps lead down a slope to the playing field below the school. In addition to light from the full-height windows on the walls overlooking the courtyards, daylight comes in through south-facing clerestories in the split-pitched roofs, illuminating the back of the classrooms.

Virtually everything in the school has been designed by Jacobsen: the interiors, fittings, desks and chairs, lighting, curtains, as well as the specially laid out gardens. Some of the items, such as the classroom lights (Munkegårdslampen) and his plexiglass panel of loud speakers, were later manufactured on an industrial basis. The small, individually planted courtyards contain antique sculptures, some freestanding, some as reliefs on the walls. Even though the school was designed for about a thousand pupils, it has an uncomplicated look and was complimented on its sensible layout and intimacy. Its simple, humane appearance is a result of the complex's carefully calculated proportions. As with Jacobsen's other works, a characteristically rigid system emerges as a living development. The result is a building which contributed to elegant school design in the 1950s. As a result of widespread interest in Munkegård, Jacobsen was chosen to design St Catherine's College, Oxford.

== Extension ==
In 1996, Munkegaard School was given the status of a listed building. In 2001, the school presented plans for alterations and extensions but these were not accepted as a result of its status. After negotiations between Gentofte Municipality and the Ministry of Culture, permission was granted for additional facilities to be built beneath the existing buildings. Under the supervision of Dorte Mandrup, work began in January 2006 and was completed at the end of 2009.
