= NGC 317 =

Pair of spiral galaxies in Andromeda

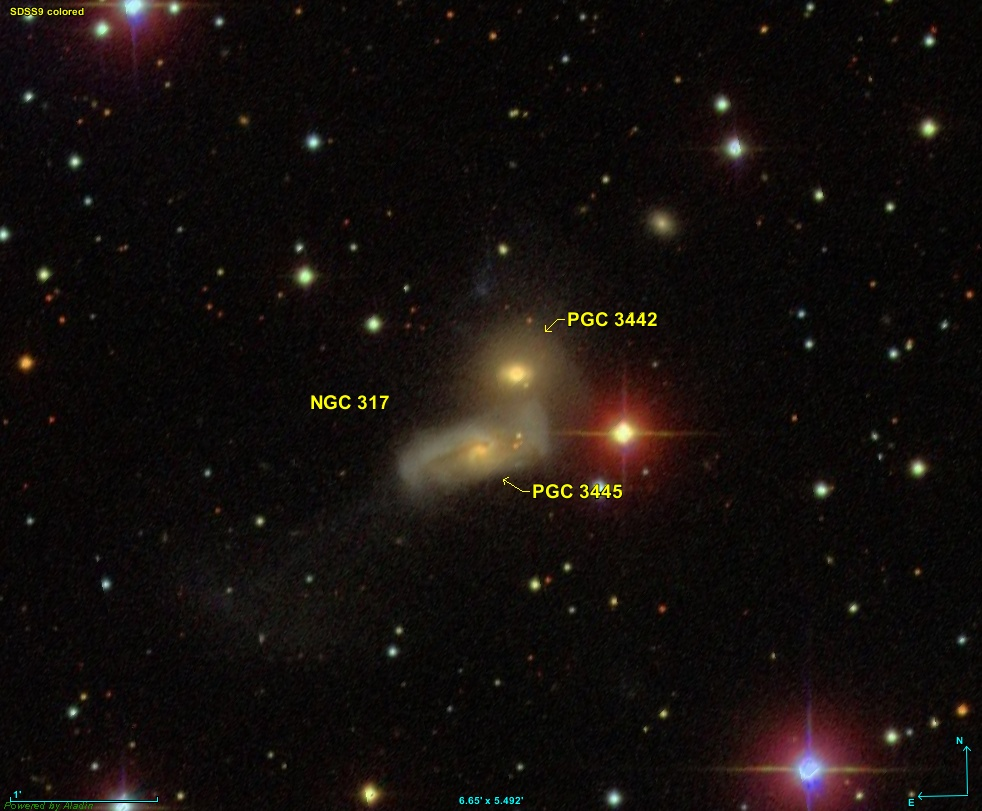
- SDSS image of NGC 317

Observation data (J2000 epoch)
- Constellation: Andromeda
- Right ascension: 00^{h} 57^{m} 39.7^{s}
- Declination: +43° 47′ 47″
- Redshift: 0.018109
- Heliocentric radial velocity: 5,429 km/s
- Apparent magnitude (V): 13.8

Characteristics
- Type: S0 + Sb

Other designations
- CGCG 536-013, PGC 3442 + PGC 3445.

NGC 317 is a pair of interacting galaxies, consisting of a lenticular galaxy NGC 317A (also designated as PGC 3442) and a spiral galaxy NGC 317B (also designated as PGC 3445), in the constellation Andromeda. It was discovered on October 1, 1885 by Lewis Swift.

== Supernovae ==
Two supernovae have been observed in NGC 317B:

- SN 1999gl (Type II, mag. 16.2) was discovered by Tom Boles on 14 December 1999.
- SN 2014dj (Type Ic, mag. 17.0) was discovered by Doug Rich and the Eagle Hill Supernova Search Program on 24 September 2014.
