= Skovshoved Petrol Station =

Filling station in Denmark

Coordinates: 55.7631°N 12.5994°E

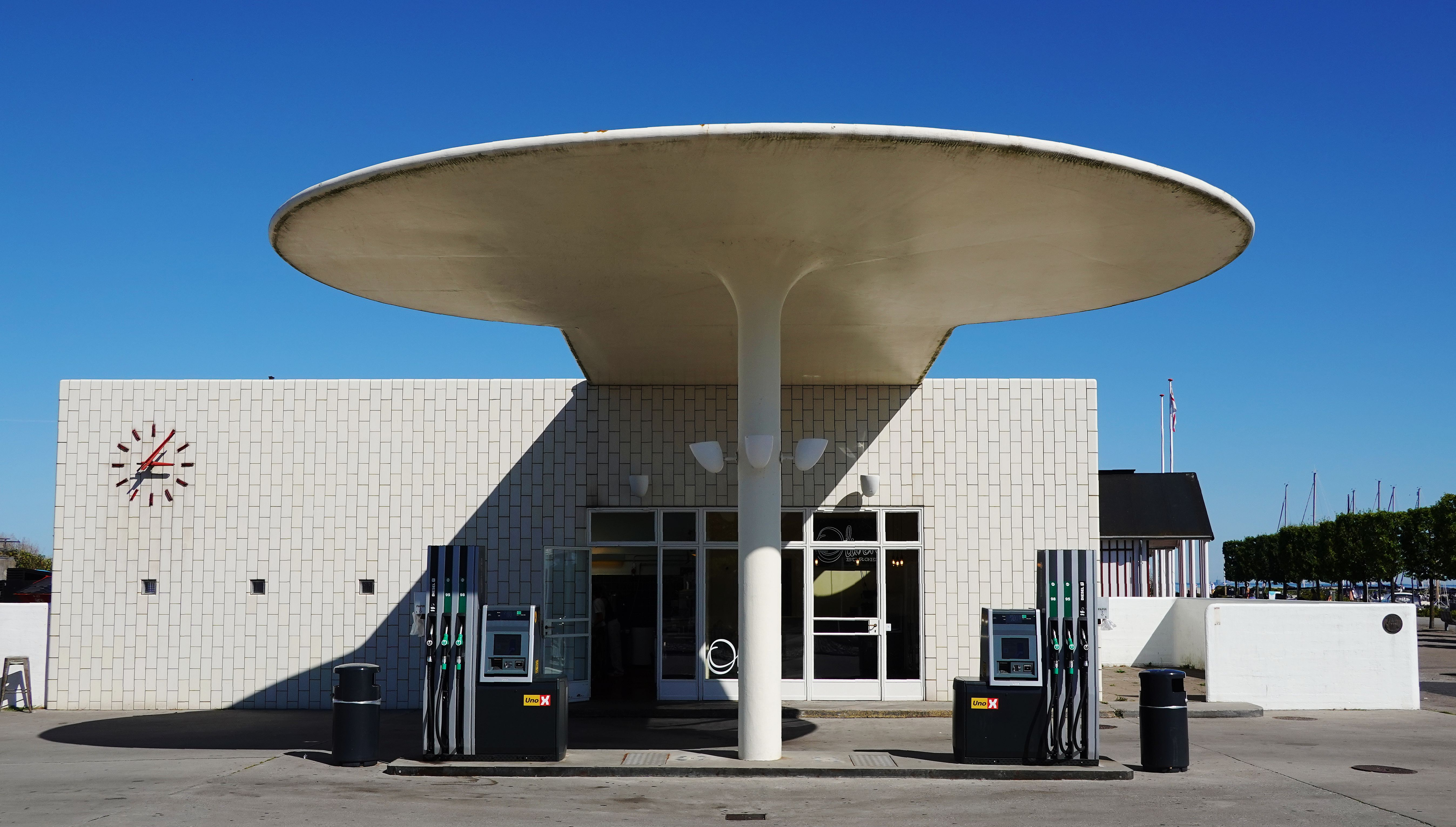
- Skovshoved Petrol Station
- Interactive map of the Skovshoved Petrol Station area

General information
- Architectural style: Functionalism (architecture)
- Location: Skovshoved, Denmark
- Completed: 1936
- Client: Texaco

Design and construction
- Architect: Arne Jacobsen

The Skovshoved Petrol Station (Danish: Skovshoved Tankstation) is a historic, still-operating filling station in Skovshoved at the northern outskirts of Copenhagen, Denmark. First opened in 1936, it was designed by Arne Jacobsen and is an example of the functionalist style typical of the time. It is Class A listed and was thoroughly restored in 2002. The filling station was originally commissioned by Texaco but is now operated by Uno-X.

While the pumps and the roof are still used as a petrol station, the main building now houses an ice cream parlor, with no relation to the petrol station business and its operations.

The exterior of the building is dominated by the projecting oval canopy, colloquially known as "The Mushroom" (Danish: Paddehatten). It offers shade and shelter for filling motorists and, illuminated from beneath, also doubles as a sign at night.
