= Rothenborg House =

Private home in Klampenborg

Coordinates: 55°46′11″N 12°34′26″E

The Rothenborg House (Danish: Rothenborgs Hus), Klampenborgvej 37, is a private home in Klampenborg, just north of Copenhagen, designed by the Danish architect Arne Jacobsen in 1930.

The house was built for the lawyer Max Rothenborg. His wife was thrilled with the building and participated enthusiastically in its furnishings. Like many of Jacobsen's works, it was planned as a complete work of art, attention being given not just to the building itself but to its interior, including furniture and fittings. The press considered it a breakthrough for Jacobsen, comparing him with Le Corbusier. Some, however, were not ready to accept it as a genuinely modernistic house as it was made of brick rather than reinforced concrete and was based on a traditionally English approach. Nevertheless, the house still has a modern look with its white facade, its iron-framed windows and its cubic forms including the white walls of its sun terrace.

The residence has undergone a number of conversions over the years, significantly detracting from its original design.

== Literature ==
- Thau, Carsten; Vindum, Kjeld: Arne Jacobsen, 2008, Copenhagen, Arkitektens forlag, 560 p. ISBN 978-87-7407-230-0
