= Dot Stool - Models 3170 and M3170 =

The Dot stool (Model 3170) is an example Danish Mid-century modern seating design. It was designed and developed by Fritz Hansen in the early 1950s and refined for production in 1954 through a collaboration with Arne Jacobsen. The Dot stool design was modified (Model M3170) in the 1960s by Jacobsen and was produced in 1969.

The Model 3170 stools were constructed of chrome plated tubular steel, plastic, and a bent wood veneer seat. The design of the stool allowed for groups to be neatly and easily stacked. The stools produced from 1954 to 1970 had three legs, and after 1970, the design changed to feature 4 legs. The 3170 stool is still being offered by retailer Republic of Fritz Hansen. It measures 17.3 inches high.

The Model M3170 were constructed of chrome plated tubular steel, plastic, and a bent wood veneer seat. It measures 24 inches high, taller than the Model 3170, and featured a steel foot rail along the bottom legs, creating a triangular shape. This model was only produced for one year in 1969.

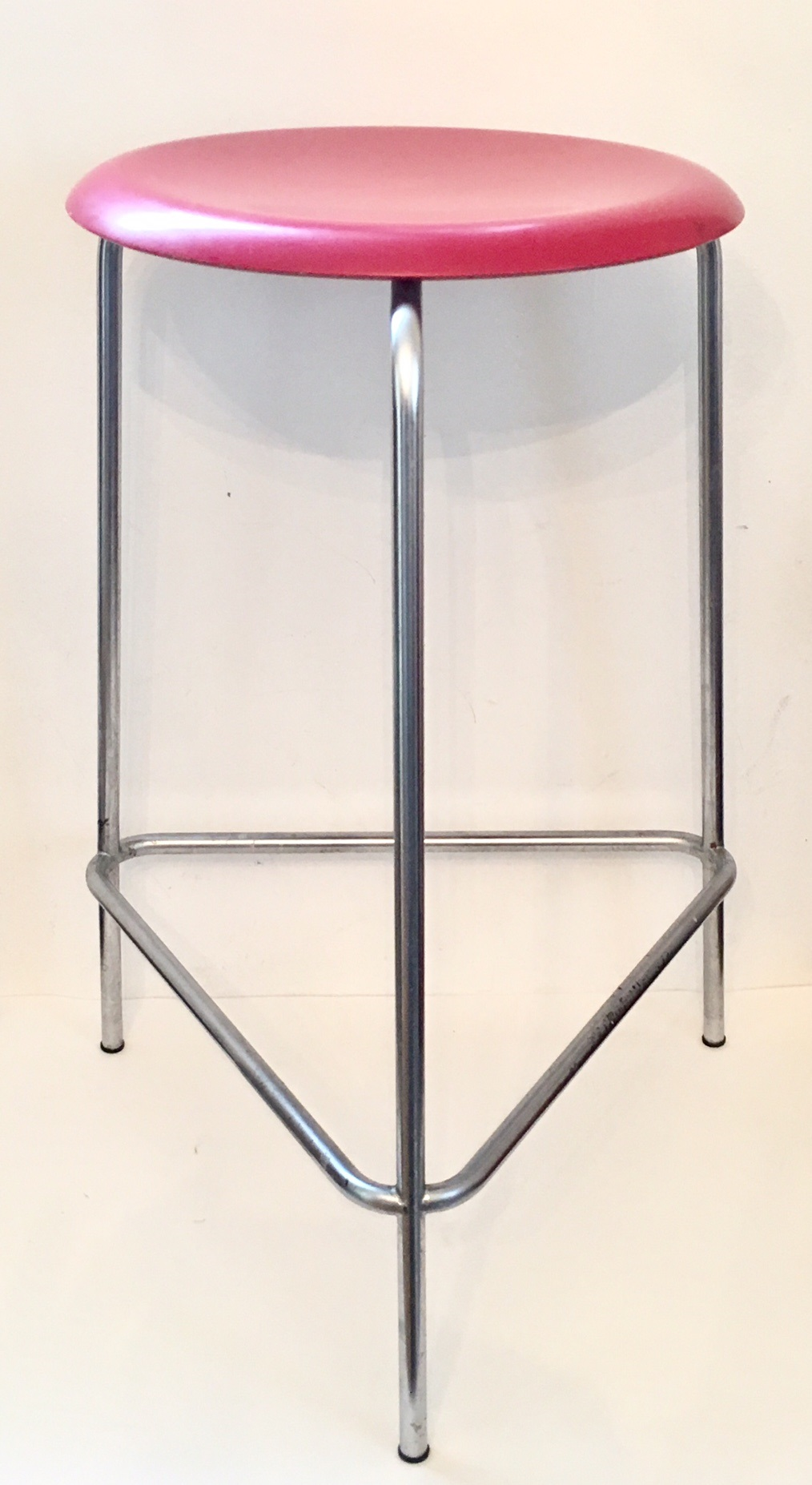
MCM Danish Dot Stool M3170 designed by Arne Jacobsen
