= Listed buildings in Gentofte Municipality =

This is a list of listed buildings in Gentofte Municipality, Denmark.

== The list ==
=== 2820 Gentofte ===
Listing name	Image	Location	Year built	Description	
Bernstorff Palace		Bernstorff Slot 1, 2820 Gentofte	55°45′30.53″N 12°33′8.36″E	Country house from 1759 designed by Nicolas-Henri Jardin	
Bernstorff Palace: The Gardener's Hose		Ved Slotshaven 8, 2820 Gentofte	55°45′18.44″N 12°32′47.14″E	The former residence (including a shed) for the gardener at Bernstorff Palace from 1884-86 designed by Ferdinand Meldahl	
Bernstorffstøtten		Lyngbyvej 0, 2820 Gentofte	55°44′7.83″N 12°32′33.72″E	Memorial from 1783 designed by Johannes Wiedewelt	
Brogårdsvej 72		Brogårdsvej 72, 2820 Gentofte	55°45′15.2″N 12°31′31.49″E	House from 1937 designed by Poul Henningsen	
Det Svenske Hus, Bernstorffsparken		Bernstorff Slot 2, 2820 Gentofte	55°45′32.721″N 12°33′3.53″E	A wooden garden pavilion in Swedish style, possibly dating from the Nordic Exhibition in Tivoli in 1888 The sister-house Det Norske Hus was moved to Aarhus after the 1888 exhibit.	
Ermelundsvej 94		Ermelundsvej 94, 2820 Gentofte	55°45′49.17″N 12°32′11.09″E	House from 1735	
Ermelundsvej 96: Sprøjtehuset		Ermelundsvej 96, 2820 Gentofte	55°45′48.12″N 12°32′14.15″E	Sprøjtehus from c. 1750, possibly by Lauritz de Thurah	
Ibstrup		Jægersborg Alle 170A, 2820 Gentofte	55°45′46.4″N 12°32′2.95″E	Two-winged house from 1867	Ref
Jægersborg Barracks		Jægersborg Alle 156 A-C, 2820 Gentofte	1734-39	Complex from 1734-39 by Lauritz de Thurah: The southeastern residential wing	Ref
Jægersborg Barracks		Jægersborg Alle 158 A-C, 2820 Gentofte	1734-39	Complex from 1734-39 by Lauritz de Thurah: The northeastern residential wing	Ref
Jægersborg Barracks		Jægersborg Alle 150A, 2820 Gentofte	1734-39	Complex from 1734-39 by Lauritz de Thurah: The northwestern residential wing	Ref
Jægersborg Barracks		Jægersborg Alle 150A, 2820 Gentofte	1734-39	Complex from 1734-39 by Lauritz de Thurah: The southwestern residential wing	Ref
Jægersborg Barracks		Jægersborg Alle 150A, 2820 Gentofte	1734-39	Complex from 1734-39 by Lauritz de Thurah: The southeastern dog house	Ref
Jægersborg Barracks		Jægersborg Alle 150A, 2820 Gentofte	1734-39	Complex from 1734-39 by Lauritz de Thurah: The northeastern dog house	Ref
Jægersborg Barracks		Jægersborg Alle 150A, 2820 Gentofte	1734-39	Complex from 1734-39 by Lauritz de Thurah: The northwestern dog house	Ref
Jægersborg Barracks		Jægersborg Alle 150A, 2820 Gentofte	1734-39	Complex from 1734-39 by Lauritz de Thurah: The southwestern dog house	Ref
Jægersborg Barracks		Jægersborg Alle 150 A-C, 2820 Gentofte	1734-39	Complex from 1734-39 by Lauritz de Thurah: The eastern stable	Ref
Jægersborg Barracks		Jægersborg Alle 150A, 2820 Gentofte	1734-39	Complex from 1734-39 by Lauritz de Thurah: The western stable	Ref
Kildeskovshallen		Adolphsvej 25, 2820 Gentofte	55°44′47.6″N 12°33′9.22″E	Indoor swimming pool from 1966-197 designed by Karen Clemmensen and Ebbe Clemmensen	
Kildeskovshallen		Adolphsvej 25, 2820 Gentofte	55°44′47.6″N 12°33′9.22″E	Sports venue from 1966-197 designed by Karen Clemmensen and Ebbe Clemmensen	
Lille Bernstorff		Jægersborg Alle 117, 2820 Gentofte	55°45′39.36″N 12°32′41.06″E	House from 1811	
Solbakkevej 57		Solbakkevej 57, 2820 Gentofte	55°45′55.24″N 12°32′31.58″E	House from 1953 designed by Ebbe Clemmensen	
Schæffergården		Ermelundsvej 105, 2820 Gentofte	55°45′49.88″N 12°32′9.08″E	FMain wing built 1754–72 and the side wings from 1950-51 by Palle Suenson	
Skovvej 35 A		Skovvej 35A, 2820 Gentofte	55°45′50.31″N 12°32′42.51″E	House and verenda from 1952 designed by Eva and Nils Koppel	
Vintappergården		Lyngbyvej 485, 2820 Gentofte	55°45′35.07″N 12°30′55.35″E	House from c. 1770, now a restaurant	

=== 2870 Dyssegård ===
Listing name	Image	Location	Year built	Description	Ref
Munkegaard School		Vangedevej 178, 2870 Dyssegård	1957	Modernistfrom 1957 designed by Arne Jacobsen	Ref

=== 2900 Hellerup ===
Listing name	Image	Location	Year built	Description
Bakkedal 7		Bakkedal 7, 2900 Hellerup	55°44′7.64″N 12°32′55.04″E	Modernist house from 1934 designed by Mogens Lassen
Bernstorffsvej 17		Bernstorffsvej 17, 2900 Hellerup	55°43′37.64″N 12°32′16.61″E	House and surrounding garden from 1931 designed by Frits Schlegel
Øregård Gymnasium		Gersonsvej 32, 2900 Hellerup	55°44′16.6″N 12°34′0.13″E	Four-winged main building with covered, central aula from 1923 designed by Gustav Bartholin Hagen and Edvard Thomsen
Øregaard		Ørehøj Alle 2, 2900 Hellerup	55°44′19.66″N 12°34′22.3″E	Former country house from 1806 designed by Joseph-Jacques Ramée. Now an art museum
Tuborg Administration Building		Strandvejen 54, 2900 Hellerup	55°43′33.74″N 12°34′37.56″E	Anton Rosen's administration building from 1913 for the Tuborg Breweries, including gate pillars, granite balls and part of the paving

=== 2920 Charlottenlund ===
Listing name	Image	Location	Year built	Description	Ref
Charlottenlund Palace		Jægersborg Alle 1A, 2920 Charlottenlund	55°44′55.91″N 12°35′8.94″E	The original country house was built by Johan Cornelius Krieger in 1730-1733, æater expanded and adapted by Ferdinand Meldahl in 1880-1881 Nicolas-Henri Jardin	Ref
Det tidl. sprøjtehus ved Charlottenlund Slot		Jægersborg Alle 2A, 2920 Charlottenlund	55°44′58.51″N 12°35′6.65″E		Ref
Femvejen 2		Femvejen 2, 2920 Charlottenlund	55°45′27.37″N 12°35′31.5″E	House with raised verenda and outbuilding from 1933-34 designed byJohan Pedersen	Ref
Femvejen 2		Femvejen 2, 2920 Charlottenlund	55°45′27.37″N 12°35′31.5″E	House with raised verenda and outbuilding from 1933-34 designed byJohan Pedersen	Ref
Gammel Skovgård		Krathusvej 36, 2920 Charlottenlund	55°46′11.35″N 12°34′21.19″E	House from c. 1820	Ref
Godfred Rodesvej 2		Gotfred Rodes Vej 2, 2920 Charlottenlund	55°46′3.43″N 12°34′6.41″E	House, greenhouse, garage building, walls and garden designed by Arne Jacobsen for his own use	Ref
Godfred Rodesvej 2		Gotfred Rodes Vej 2, 2920 Charlottenlund	55°46′3.43″N 12°34′6.41″E	House, greenhouse, garage building, walls and garden designed by Arne Jacobsen for his own use	Ref
Jægersborg Allé 90		Jægersborg Alle 90, 2920 Charlottenlund	55°45′28.64″N 12°33′35.12″E	Stable building from c. 1800	Ref
Jægersborg Allé 92-94		Jægersborg Alle 92, 2920 Charlottenlund	55°45′29.37″N 12°33′35.01″E	House from c. 1800	Ref
Krathusvej 2: Kai Nielsen House		Krathusvej 2, 2920 Charlottenlund	55°45′58.88″N 12°34′26.1″E	House from 1916 designed by Ivar Bentsen for the sculptor Kai Nielsen and the wall along Ørnekulsvej	Ref
Krathusvej 7 (2)		Krathusvej 7, 2920 Charlottenlund	c. 1927	House from 1937 designed by Aage Rafn for his own use with a later extension	Ref
Krathusvej 7 (2)		Krathusvej 7, 2920 Charlottenlund	c. 1927	Later extension	Ref
Skovshoved Petrol Station		Kystvejen 24, 2920 Charlottenlund	c1937	Petrol station from 1937 designed by Arne Jacobsen	Ref
Smutvej 14		Smutvej 14, 2920 Charlottenlund	1955	House and verenda from 1955 designed by Erik Kristian Sørensen	Ref
Systemhuset		Ordrupvej 70A, 2920 Charlottenlund	55°45′44.23″N 12°34′33.07″E	Apartment building from 1937 designed by Mogens Lassen and Ernst Ishøy	Ref

=== 2930 Klampenborg ===
Listing name	Image	Location	Year built	Description	Ref
Bellavista		Strandvejen 419, 2930 Klampenborg	55°46′23.62″N 12°35′23.62″E	Modernist housing estate from 1933 designed by Arne Jacobsen	Ref
Bellavista		Strandvejen 419, 2930 Klampenborg	55°46′23.62″N 12°35′23.62″E	Garage complex from 1933 designed by Arne Jacobsen	Ref
Bellevue Beach (9)		Strandvejen 338A and 340, 2930 Klampenborg	1938	Kiosks, lifeguard towers and changing cabins	Ref1
Bellevue Theatre		Strandvejen 435-451, 2930 Klampenborg	1936	Theatre building designed by Arne Jacobsen	Ref
Bellevue Theatre		Strandvejen 435-451, 2930 Klampenborg	1936	Theatre building designed by Arne Jacobsen	Ref
Bellevue Theatre		Strandvejen 435-451, 2930 Klampenborg	1936	Residential wing	Ref
Bellevue Theatre		Strandvejen 435-451, 2930 Klampenborg	1936	Garage	Ref
Belvedere		Strandvejen 407, 2930 Klampenborg	55°46′24.31″N 12°35′32.49″E	House from 1842 and altered in 1848	Ref
Christiansholm		Christiansholm Slot 1, 2930 Klampenborg	55°46′22.121″N 12°35′15.45″E	Former country house built between 1746 and 1767	Ref
Emiliekilde		Emiliekildevej 0, 2930 Klampenborg	55°46′21.07″N 12°35′39″E	A 5.7 m tall memorial designed by Nicolai Abildgaard	Ref
Hvidørevej 24		Hvidørevej 24, 2930 Klampenborg	55°46′6.74″N 12°35′18.29″E	House with courtyard from 1940 designed by Mogens Lassen	Ref
Hvidørevej 28		Hvidørevej 28, 2930 Klampenborg	55°46′6.95″N 12°35′16.06″E	House from 1957 designed by Mogens Lassen	Ref
Klampenborg station (3)		Dyrehavevej 1, 2930 Klampenborg	1897	Railway station consisting of waiting room, platform roof and control post from 1897 design by Heinrich Wenck	Ref
Ordrup station		Kystbanen 21, 2930 Klampenborg	1957	Station building from 1924 designed by K.T. Seest	Ref
Søholm		Søholm Park 1, 2900 Hellerup	55°43′26.25″N 12°33′10.66″E	Søholm is a Neoclassical house from 1806-09 designedby Christian Frederik Hansen, possibly in collaboration with Peder Malling	Ref
Søholm Row Houses, Bellevuekrogen (19)		Strandvejen 413, Bellevuekrogen 20-26, 2930 Klampenborg	1946-50	Søholm I: One terrace with five houses designed by Arne Jacobsen (5)	Ref
Søholm Row Houses, Bellevuekrogen (19)		Bellevuekrogen 2-18, 2930 Klampenborg	1949-57	Søholm II: Two terraces with 3 and six houses	Ref
Søholm Row Houses, Bellevuekrogen (19)		Bellevuekrogen 1-7, 2930 Klampenborg		Søholm III: One terrace with four one-storey houses	390-13422-15
Søholm Row Houses, Bellevuekrogen (19)		Bellevuekrogen 903, 2930 Klampenborg	1951	Garage complex	[ Ref Ref]
Sølystvej 5		Sølystvej 5, 2930 Klampenborg	1935, 1960	Modernist house on a sloping site built by Mogens Lassen for his owned use. He expanded and altered the premises throughout his life, using it as an experimentarium. Studio building from 1960	Ref
Sølystvej 5		Sølystvej 5, 2930 Klampenborg	1935, 1960	Studio building from 1960	Ref
Sølystvej 5		Sølystvej 5, 2930 Klampenborg		Outbuilding	Ref
Sølystvej 7		Sølystvej 7, 2930 Klampenborg	1933	Moernist house from 1933 designed by Mogens Lassen	Ref
Sølystvej 11		Sølystvej 11, 2930 Klampenborg	1938, 1949	Moernist hous from 1938 designed by Mogens Lassen, including walls, stairs and trees. Garage building from 1949	Ref
Sølystvej 11		Sølystvej 11, 2930 Klampenborg	1938, 1949	Moernist hous from 1938 designed by Mogens Lassen, including walls, stairs and trees. Garage building from 1949	Ref
Ved Bellevue Bugt (6)		Strandvejen 415 A-E og 417 A	1962	Residential development from 1962 consisting of an apartment building and one-storey atrium houses designed by Arne Jacobsen	Ref

== See also ==
- List of churches in Gentofte Municipality
