= Femvejen 2 =

Building in Gentofte Municipality, Denmark

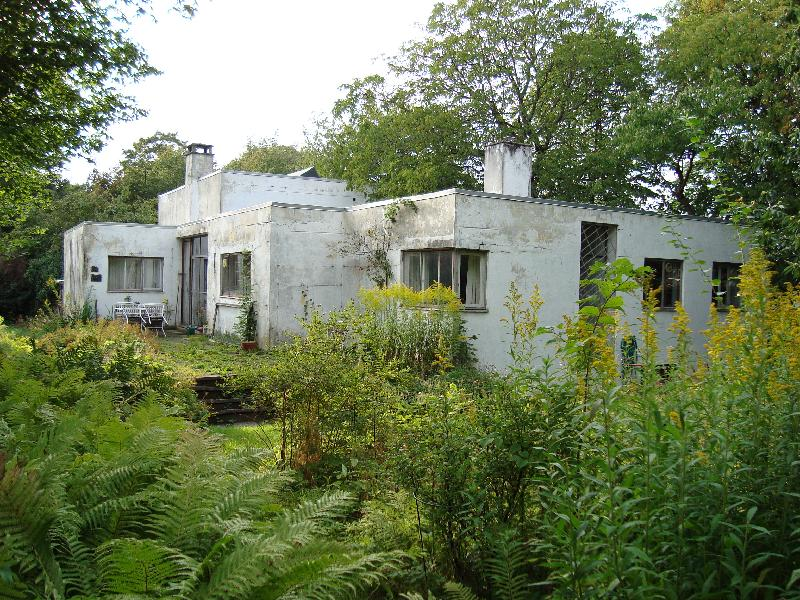
- Interactive map of the Femvejen 2 area

General information
- Architectural style: Modernist
- Location: Copenhagen, Denmark
- Coordinates: 55°45′27.36″N 12°33′31.5″E
- Completed: 1934

Design and construction
- Main contractor: Georg Jacobsen

Femvejen 2 is a Modernist villa situated at the corner of Bernstorffsvej and Jægersborg Allé, next to the Femvejen roundabout, in Gentofte Municipality, in northern Copenhagen, Denmark. Built in 1933–34 for artists Adam and Ellen Fischer to designs by their friend and fellow artist Georg Jacobsen, all of whom lived in Paris at the time, its design reflects the Fischers' and Jacobsen's shared interest in Cubism. The house contains Fischer's atelier. Its next owner was the painter Victor Brockdorff. The house and a detached outhouse were both listed in the Danish registry of protected buildings and places in 2010.

== History ==
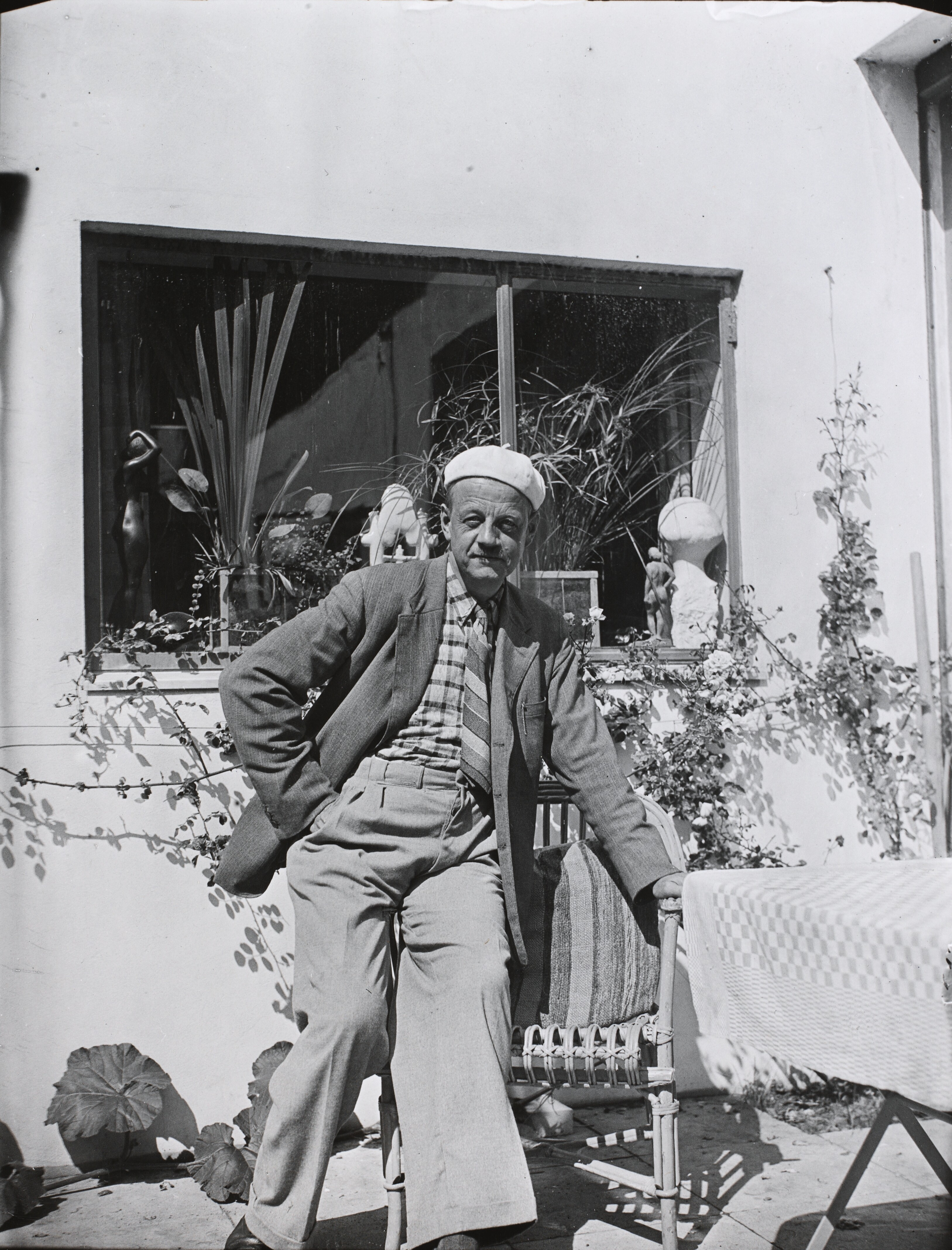
Adam Fischer photographed by Holger Damgaard.

Adam Fischer and Ellen Kragh moved to Paris to study painting in 1913. They were married in 1915. Adam Fischer started out by attending André Lhote's painting school but was soon inspired by also Paris-based sculptor Johannes Bjerg to turn to sculpture. He was one of the first Danish sculptors to be inspired by Cubism. Ellen Fischer studied under Maurice Denis at the Académie Ranson in 1913-14 and later under André Lhote at the Académie Moderne in 1917-19).

The couple owned a house in Arcueil. Their daughter Tora (Tora Garde), who would later become a ceramist), was born in 1923. One of their friends was fellow artist Georg Jacobsen (1887‐1976), who had moved to Paris in 1919 and lived in the same neighborhood. He had first trained as a mason before enrolling at the Royal Danish Academy of Fine Arts' School of Architecture, but shortly thereafter transferred to the painting school.

In 1932, in antecipation of their return to Denmark, Adam and Ellfen Fischer charged Jacobsen with the design of a house in Gentofte. Jacobsen had already designed four houses. One of them was his own house in Acrueil. The three others were in Denmark: An Arts & Crafts inspired house in Espergærde (Lindevej 6, Espergærde – Save 3), a holiday home at Skagen for the writer Jesper Ewald (Søren Skomagers Vej 3, Skagen – Save 2) and a house in Ringsted (Bolbrovej 2, Rungsted – Save 3). Jacobsen had yet to depart Paris when house construction broke ground and Johan Pedersen, who would later serve as city architect, was therefore responsible for overseeing the construction process. In 1935, Jacobsen was appointed as professor at the Art Academy in Oslo. He returned to Denmark in 1940.

Ellen and Adam Fischer died two years apart in 1966 and 1968. Their daughter chose to sell the house to the painter Victor Brockdorff and his wife Alice (née Zollfranck) to ensure that the atelier would continue to be used by an artist. The southern part of the garden was sold off to another buyer. Victor Brockdorff died in 1002. His widow Alice owned the house until at least 2010.

In 1985, Jørgen Sestoft published a pamphlet about the history of the house. This prompted other architects to propose a heritage listing of the house but this was initially rejected by the Særlige Bygningssyn. In 2007, Femvejen 2 was again nominated for heritage listing. On 15 September 2010, it was heritage listed.

== Architecture ==
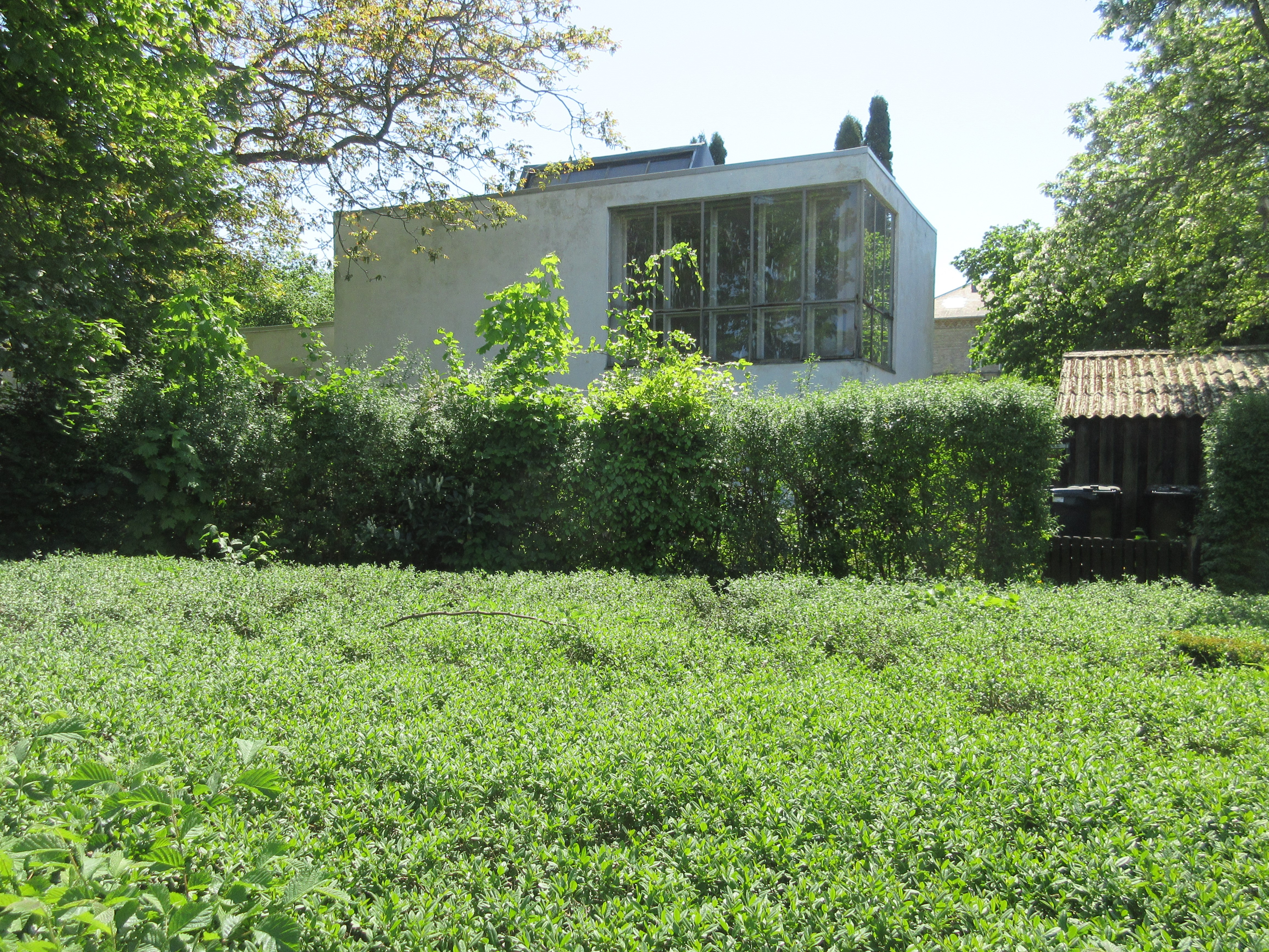
One of the characteristic corner windows seen from the street.

The house is constructed of brick on a concrete deck which is raised three steps from the surrounding garden. It was originally yellow but white-washed when Brockdorff bought the house in 1968. Georg Jacobsen described the yellow colour as "somewhere between Naples yellow and lemon yellow—not as sharp as lemon and not as warm as Naples". The house is a cubist composition made up of four boxes. Its proportions are based on the Golden ratio. The flat roof and iron-framed corner windows are tell-tale signs of its early Modernist style. The one furthest to the east contains the kitchen, pantry, maid's room, basement staircase and child's room. The central box contains the hall, bathroom, toilet, bedroom, built-in cupboards and living room. The southern box contains another child's room and a workshop. The western box contains Fischer's former atelier. The main entrance is located on the north side of the central box, which is set back from the eastern one to create a small protected space in front of it. The atelier has extra high ceilings, obtained by lowering its floor by two steps while at the same time letting its roof rise above the rest of the house. It is lit with skylights to allow for maximum daylight. An extra large door to the garden made it possible to move Fischer's sculptures in and out of his workspace. The house is located in the middle of the garden. The vegetation is dominated by large trees and ferns.
