= Søholm =

Søholm may refer to:

- Søholm, a locality in Fredensborg Municipality
- Søholm (country house), a historical building in Hellerup, Denmark, headquarter to Bjørn Thorsen A/S
- Søholm Row Houses, row houses in Klampenborg, Denmark
- Søholm, estate in Assens Municipality, Denmark
- Søholm, estate in Stevns Municipality, Denmark
- Søholm Keramik, ceramic manufactury on Bornholm, Denmark
