= Niels Andersen (businessman) =

Danish businessman and politician

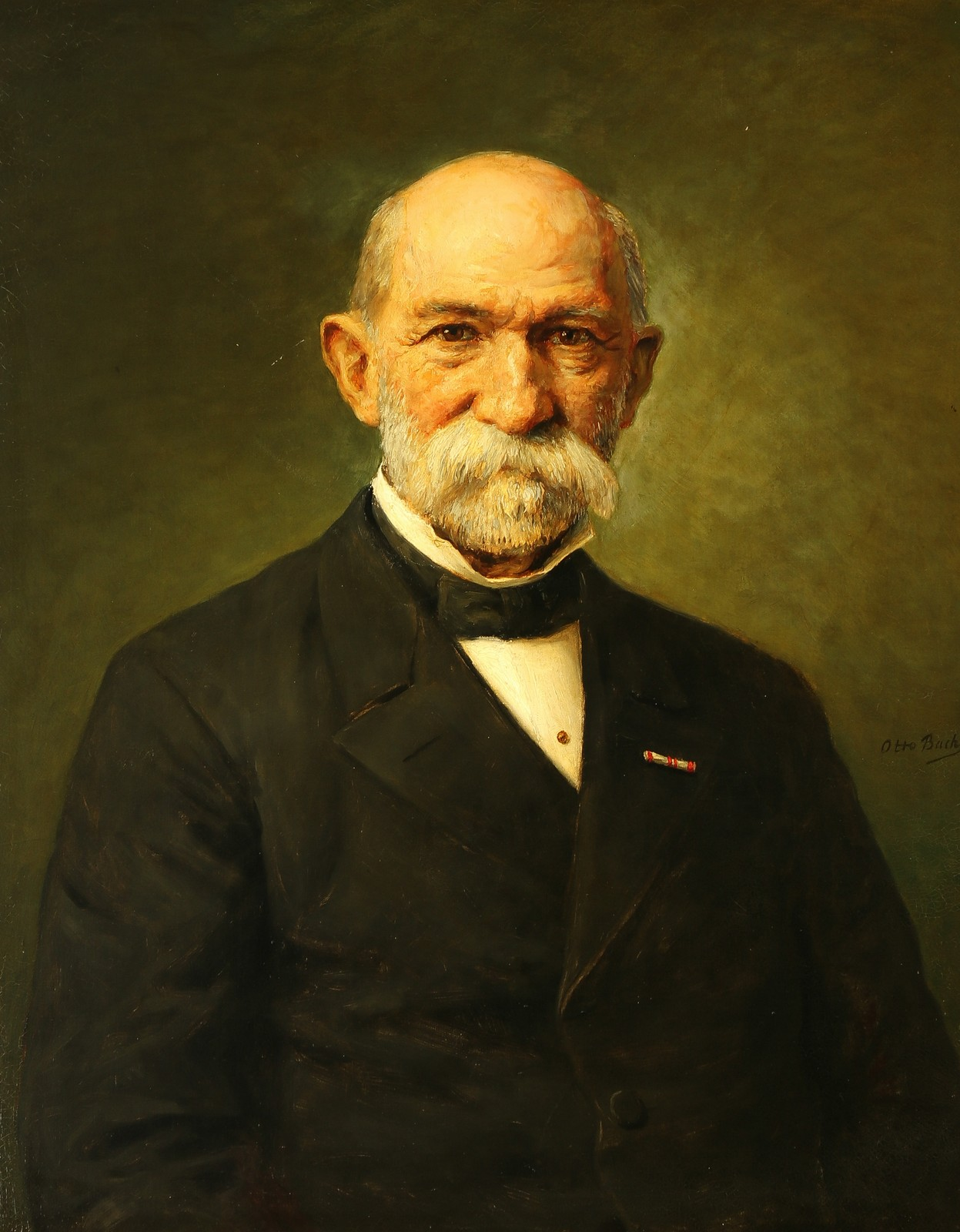
- Niels Andersen painted by Otto Bache
- Born: 11 September 1835; Ydby, Denmark
- Died: 12 September 1911 (aged 76); Gentofte, Denmark
- Resting place: Garrison Cemetery, Copenhagen
- Occupations: Businessman and politician
- Awards: Commander of the Order of the Dannebrog, 1909

Niels Andersen (11 September 1835 – 12 September 1911) was a Danish businessman and politician. He created the first large construction company in Denmark. He served as the first president of the Confederation of Danish Employers from 1896 to 1907.

He owned Sæholm in Gentofte from 1877.

== Early life and education ==
Andersen was born on a farm at Ydby, Thisted County, the son of Anders Nielsen (1794–1862) and Ane Margrethe Didriksdatter (1797–1857). The farm was small and his father therefore had to supplement his income by transporting stone and gravel for the county's road construction. From an early age, Andersen had to take part in this work. He received no formal schooling but worked hard to acquire knowledge at home, strongly encouraged by his mother, and attended the writing school for petty officers during his Conscription years as a dragoon in 1855–57.

== Career ==
Straight out of the army he started a small construction company. In 1862 he successfully took on the construction of the new Hillerød-Fredensborg railway. After being redrafted during the Second Schleswig War, his company grew rapidly from a number of other contracts on rail lines; The South Zealand Railway to Køge (1869–70), Helsingborg-Hassleholm with a Bjuv-Billesholm branch (1873–74), Århus-Ryomgård (1876–78), Gribskov Railway (1879), Randers-Hadsund (1882–84) and the Gedser Railway (1886), He also worked on the expansion of Helsingør Garbour in 1879–81 and the construction of the Strandvejen Steam Tram Line 1883.

In 1887, he began a partnership with N. C. Monberg. He left the company in 1899.

== Politics, organisations and public offices ==
Andersen was involved in politics from an early age, He was especially committed to the defence agenda and was a board member of the 1884 founded organisation iværksatte selvbeskatning til forsvarssagens fremme. He was involved in the construction of the Garderhøj Fort as well as the acquisition of land for the rest of the new fortification ring. He was also elected for the Parliament (Rigsdagen) in Nykøbing Mors. He lost his seat at the 1884 election but was 28 September 1886 reelected at a by-election in his home town. He transferred to the Thisted constituency in 1903 where he was elected until giving up his seat in 1909. He was associated Højre but was often in opposition to Minister of Transportation Hans Peter Ingerslev on railway matters. This led to Venstre electing him to spokesperson in connection with the preparations of the State Railways Act in 1891–92.

Andersen was also chairman of the Parish Council (sognerådsformand) in Gentofte from 1889 to 1900 and a member of the County Council (amtsrådsmedlem) in 1889–1910.

He was strongly involved in the establishment of Arbejdsgiverforeningen af 1896) in 1896 and its later expansion into Dansk Arbejdsgiver- og Mesterforening in 1898. He wanted the organisation to become a future bulwark against conflict between worker and employer and was involved in the September Settlement which ended the 1899 Great Lockout. He resigned as president of Dansk Arbejdsgiverforening on 8 May 1907 and was the following year appointed as honorary member.

Andersen was also chairman of Entreprenørforeningen, Arbejdsgivernes Ulykkesforsikring, Danske Lloyd, Bankrådet for Laane- og Diskontobanken, and a member of overskatterådet.

== Personal life ==
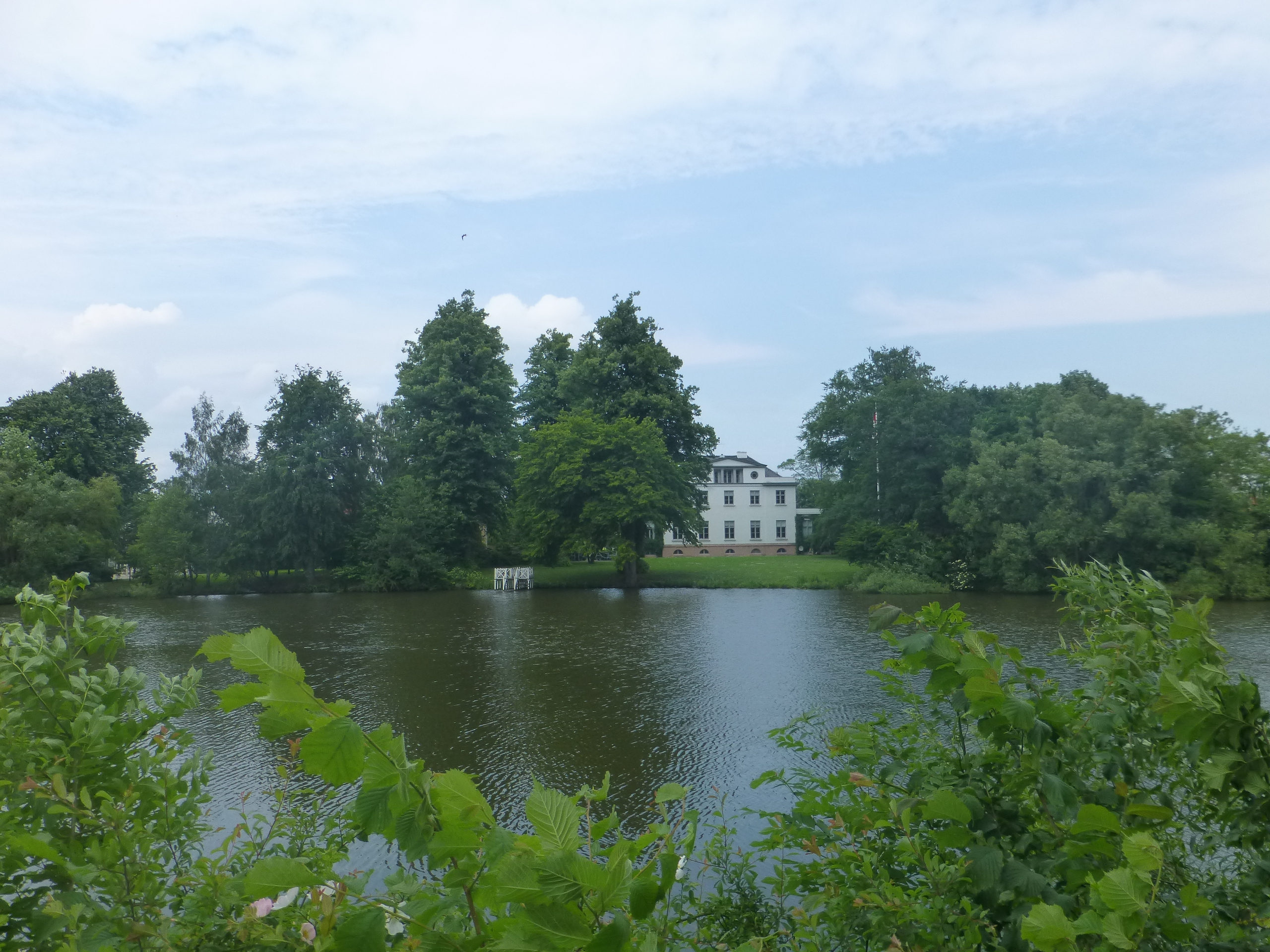
Søholm seen from the other side of Lake Emdrup

Andersen married Thora Amalie Husen (22 April 1845 - 16 July 1917/ on 20. April 1866.

In 1877, Andersen acquired the country house Søholm on the northern shores of Lake Emdrup (then Lundehussøen).

In 1903, he gifted a plantation to his home town Boddum-Ydby. The residents erected a monument to his honour.

One of his daughters, Dagmar Theresia Rasmussen, married the polar explorer Knud Rasmussen.
