= Christian Ludvig von Holten =

Danish military officer and colonial administrator

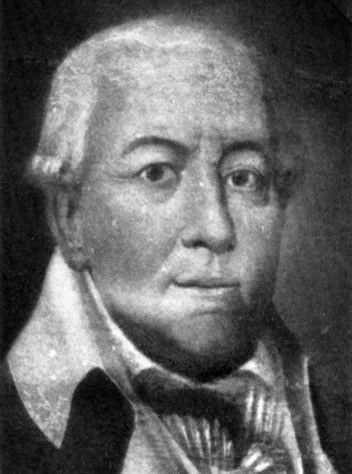
Christian Ludvig Holten.

Christian Ludvig von Holten (29 April 1774 - 21 February 1829) was a Danish military officer and colonial administrator who served as Governor of St. Thomas and St. John in the Danish West Indies from 1815 to 1819 and again in 1820. He was succeeded by Peter von Scholten.

== Biography ==
Holten was born at Kongsdal as the second-oldest son of Colonel Ghristian Ludvig Holten and Frederikke Sophie de Klaumann. His father was head of the Norwegian Life Regiment.

== Career ==
Holten became a junior lieutenant in the Norwegian Life Regiment in 1790. In 1796, he moved to the Danish West Indies to join the West Indian Garrison. He was then promoted through the ranks to colonel. In February 1807, he became a member of the Government Council on St. Thomas. On 14 February 1814, he was appointed as Governor of St. Thomas and St. John. He was later promoted through the ranks to first colonel lieutenant (2 May 1814) and colonel (28 October 1817). He was also appointed as chamberlain.

On 1 April 1818, Holsten chose to resign. He was succeeded by Peter von Scholten. In early 1820 (11 February - 31 March), he briefly returned to the post as governor of the islands.

== Personal life ==
Golten married in 1797 to Dorothea von Haxthausen (1778 on St. Croix-1842).He owned the plantation Frydendal in the years around 1816. He died on 21 February 1829.
