= Adam Fischer (sculptor) =

Danish sculptor (1888–1968)

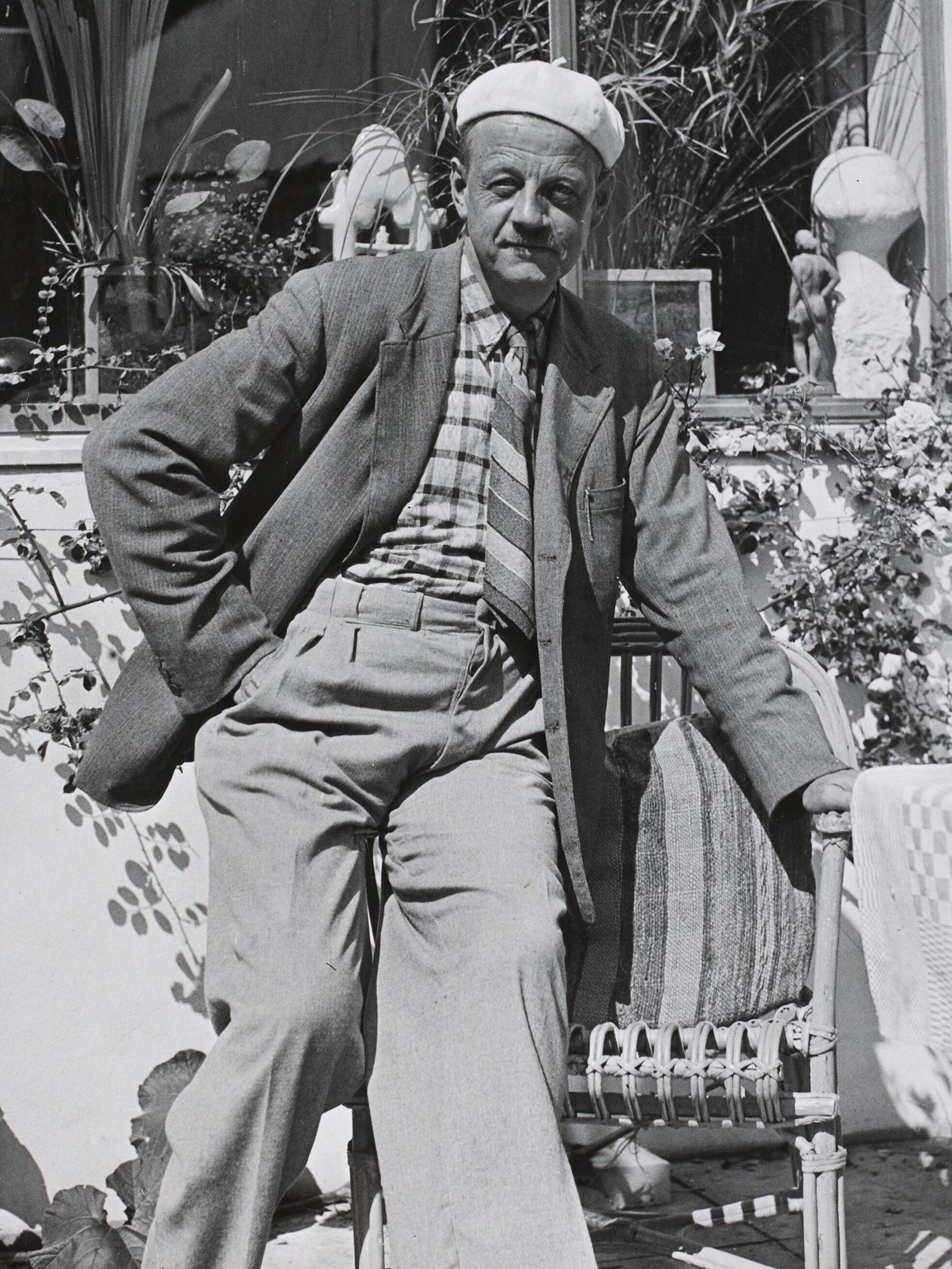
Fischer photographed by Holger Damgaard.

Adam Fischer (28 July 1888 in Copenhagen – 18 January 1968 in Ordrup) was a Danish sculptor, an early contributor of works inspired by Cubism.

== Early life and education ==
Fischer was born on 27 July 1888 in Copenhagen, the son of cattle commissioner (Kreaturkommissionær) Conrad Frederik Fischer and Eva Alexandra Juliane Emilie Fischer (née Matthiessen). After attending Vermehren's drawing school until 1908, Fischer studied painting at the Danish Academy (1908–1913) under Viggo Johansen but as a sculptor he was largely self-taught.

== Career ==
From 1913 to 1933, he lived in Paris where he crafted statuettes and busts which are among the first examples of Danish sculpture inspired by Cubism. They include Ellen Fischer (walnut, 1917) and Fransk Soldat (limestone, 1918), depicting a soldier with a face made up of two halves, each with its own expression. Another early work which shows his appreciation of "the moment" is his bronze statuette Fodboldspiller (Football Player, 1915), an unusual subject for sculpture. The figure's head, arms and legs are created in two different positions, rather like a photograph taken by a camera which has moved. From 1920, influenced by Diego Rivera and Aristide Maillol, he adopted a naturalistic idiom based on principles of Constructivism. He created a number of works consisting of women bearing jars, either in walking or sitting positions. From 1922, Fischer was a member of the Grønningen artists cooperative.

One of his most important works is the memorial to Prime Minister Ove Rode in Ove Rode Square, Copenhagen, with a statue of a woman bearing a child and carrying a basket. He also created some fine busts including Diego Rivera (1918), Drenghoved (Boy's Head, 1922) and Astrid Noack (1928). His interest in ceramic glazes can be seen in a series titled Ung pige fra Kreta (Young girl from Crete).

== Awards ==
Fischer was awarded the Eckersberg Medal in 1936, for his bust Eva la Cour, the Thorvaldsen Medal in 1950 and the Prince Eugen Medal in 1960.

== Bibliography ==
- Inge Vibeke Raaschou-Nielsen, Marianne Brøns, Gitte Valentiner: "København/Paris/retur", Copenhagen, 1982, Statens museum for kunst, 48 pp. ISBN 8775510170 (in Danish)
