= Peter von Scholten =

Danish army officer and colonial administrator

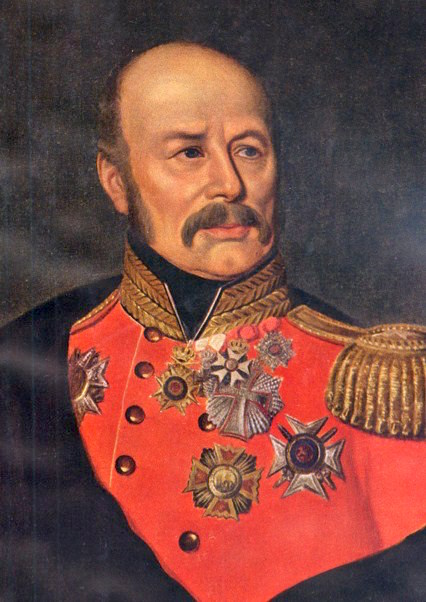

Governor of St. Thomas, St. John
- In office 1818 – June 1820
- Monarch: Frederick VI
- Preceded by: Christian Ludvig von Holten
- Succeeded by: Carl Gottlieb Fleischer

Governor-General of the Danish West Indies
- In office 1827–1848
- Monarchs: Frederick VI (until December 1839), Christian VIII
- Preceded by: Christian Ludvig von Holten
- Succeeded by: Frederik von Oxholm

Personal details
- Born: Peter Carl Frederik von Scholten; 17 May 1784 Vestervig, Denmark
- Died: 26 January 1854 (aged 69) Altona, Holstein, (present day Germany)
- Spouse: Anne Elisabeth Thortsen (m. 1810)
- Parent(s): Casimir Wilhelm von Scholten; Catharina Elisabeth de Moldrup

Peter Carl Frederik von Scholten (17 May 1784 – 26 January 1854) was a Danish army officer and colonial administrator who served as Governor-General of the Danish West Indies from 1827 to 1848.

== Early life and education ==
He was born in Vestervig, Thy, Denmark as the son of captain Casimir Wilhelm von Scholten and Catharina Elisabeth de Moldrup.

== Career ==
As a young man, von Scholten joined the Danish army and in 1803 he was appointed ensign in a unit stationed in the West Indies. He was transported to Great Britain when the British occupied the Danish West Indies in 1807. Von Scholten married Anne Elisabeth Thortsen, daughter of Danish army captain Johan Thortsen, on October 31, 1810. Later, he had a career as an officer in Copenhagen, first as a second lieutenant in the Det Sjællandske Jægerkorps (a Danish Jaeger or rifle regiment) in 1808, promoted to premier lieutenant in 1811, he reached the rank of staff captain in 1813. This led his becoming adjutant for Frederick VI of Denmark's general adjudant Frants Cristopher Bülow. He served in this role until 1814 when the British occupation of the Danish West Indies ended, and he got his first official position on St. Thomas, as customs toller.

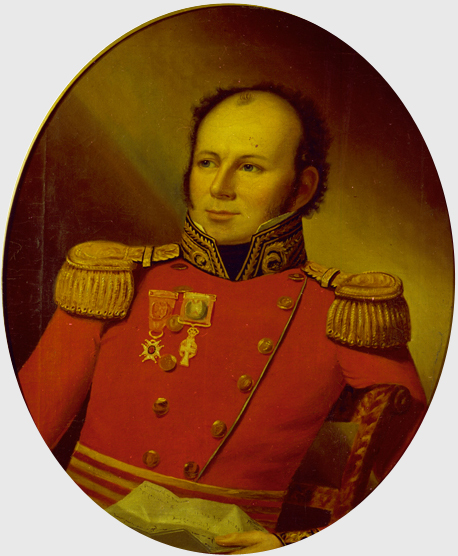
Portrait of von Scholten at an early age.

Von Scholten continued to advance in the Danish military, becoming major in 1816, lieutenant colonel in 1820, commander of Dannebrog in 1828, and major general in 1829. In 1827, he became acting governor general of St. Thomas. From 1835 to 1848, he served as governor general for all three islands, Saint Thomas, Saint Croix, and Saint John, giving him overall command of the islands. During this period he showed himself a patriarchal administrator trying to lighten the burden of the slaves and to restrain racial tensions. He did this by creating schools for the black population, as well as permitting them private ownership. (Picture of ruins of Von Scholten school, St. Croix.)

In spite of his relatively liberal attitudes, von Scholten was opposed to Christian VIII of Denmark's ruling that every child born of an unfree woman should be free from birth, as he felt that such an arrangement would cause discontent with serious consequences. When the new policy was brought into effect, he felt himself proven right as a slave rebellion broke out on St. Croix in 1848. Von Scholten responded by, on 3 July 1848, emancipating all slaves in the Danish West Indies.

== Late years in Denmark and Altona ==
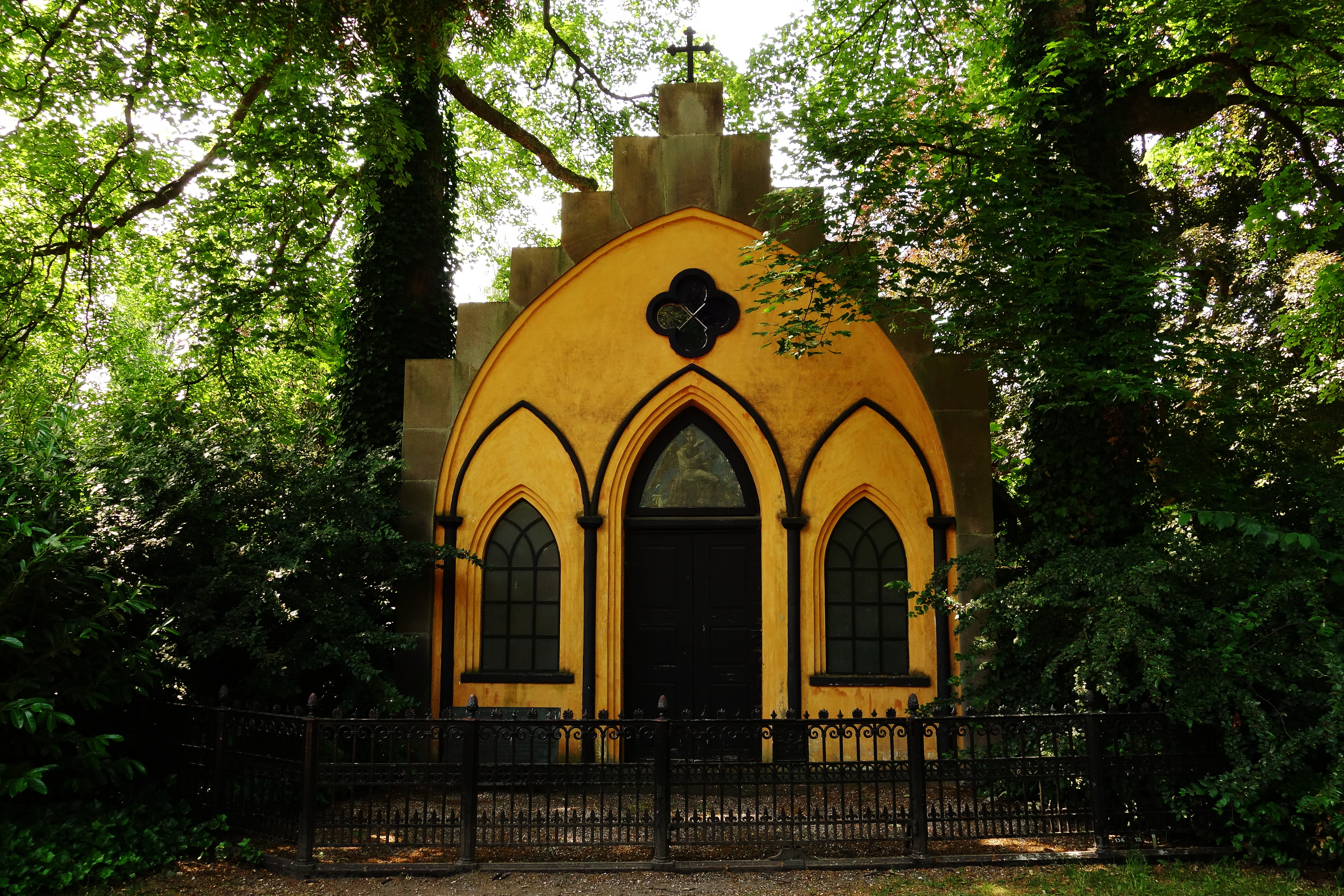
Von Scholten's mausoleum in Assistens Cemetery, Copenhagen.

Shortly thereafter, von Scholten was called back to Denmark. There, a humiliating and hard trial was brought against him for treason due to undermining colonial interests by abolishing slavery. He was denied his pension at first, although he was later cleared of the charges and acquitted shortly before his death. Von Scholten was the last governor general of the West Indies because of the beginning democratisation of the Danish state and colonial administration. Von Scholten died on 26 January 1854 in Altona, Holstein (present day Germany), leaving little to his heirs. He is buried in Assistens Cemetery, Copenhagen.

== Personal life ==
During his early years on St. Thomas, von Scholten enjoyed a wealthy lifestyle due to his position as customs officer during the surge in trade under the state of war between the nearby Spanish islands and the South American colonial insurgents. He later gained promotion to the position of Governor based on St. Croix. At this time, von Scholten lived with Anna Heegaard (1790–1859), a woman of color. The consensus amongst modern scholars is that Anna Heegaard influenced von Scholten into a policy of more humane treatment of the black population. They bought the country house Bülowsminde. Von Scholten's brother Frederik also served on the West Indian Islands. Von Scholten married Anna Elizabeth (Lise) Thortsen in Copenhagen in 1810. The couple had three daughters.

He owned a property at Bredgade 45 in Copenhagen from 1831 to 1849. After his return to Denmark he acquired the country house Belvedere in Klampenborg on the coast north of Copenhagen. Von Scholten was buried in Assistens Cemetery in Copenhagen.

== Cultural references ==
His fate has inspired several authors. Von Scholten is portrayed in the Danish 1987 drama film Peter von Scholten, where he was played by Ole Ernst.

== Bibliography ==
- C. F. Bricka (editor), Dansk biografisk Lexikon, first edition, 19 volumes, 1887–1905, Vol. XV. Online edition available: https://runeberg.org/dbl/15/ (pages 255 and 256. Numbered as 257 and 258 in the online edition).

Political offices
Preceded by Christian Ludvig von Holten	Governor-General of the Danish West Indies; 1827–1848	Succeeded by Frederik von Oxholm
