= Belvedere, Gentofte Municipality =

Country house in Klampenborg, Denmark

Belvedere
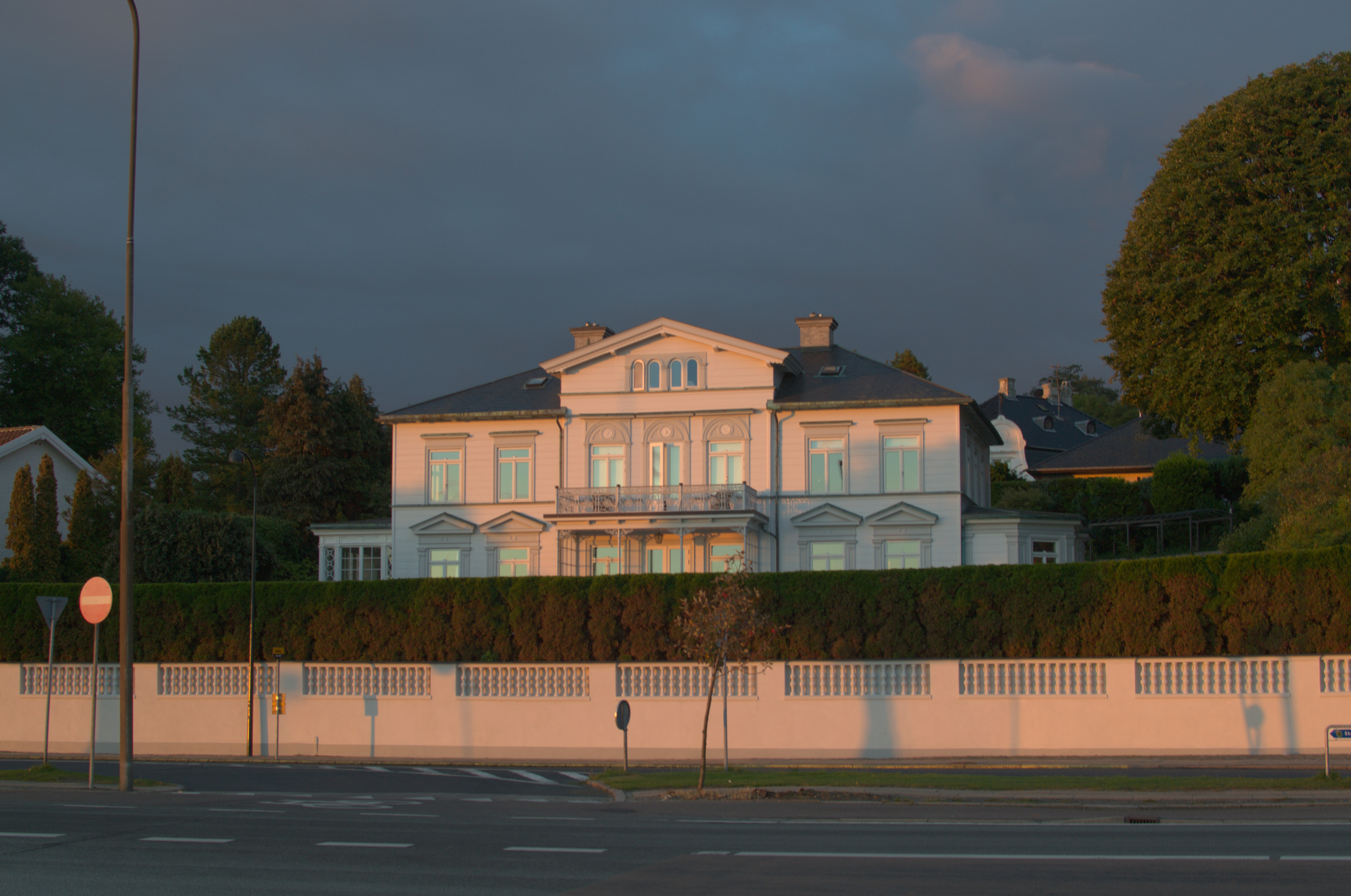
- Interactive map of the Belvedere area

General information
- Location: Klampenborg, Gentofte Municipality, Denmark
- Coordinates: 55°46′24.31″N 12°35′32.49″E
- Completed: 1842

Belvedere is a Neoclassical country house located at Strandvejen 407 in Klampenborg, Gentofte Municipality, some 15 kilometres north of central Copenhagen, Denmark. It was listed by the Danish Heritage Agency in the Danish registry of protected buildings and places on 3 January 1989.

== History ==
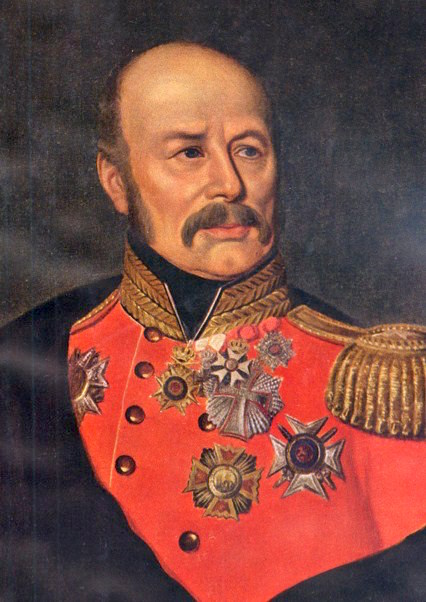
Peter von Scholten

The property was originally a copyhold (arvefæste) under Christiansholm. The original Belvedere was built in 1842. The house was adapted for Peter von Scholten in 1848. He had just returned from the Danish West Indies where he had served as governor-general and emancipated slavery immediately prior to his departure from the islands on 14 July 1848. Peter von Scholten was also the owner of a property at Bredgade 45 in Copenhagen. His wife Lise died in 1949 and a few years later he moved to Altona where he lived with his daughter and son-in-law until his death in 1854.

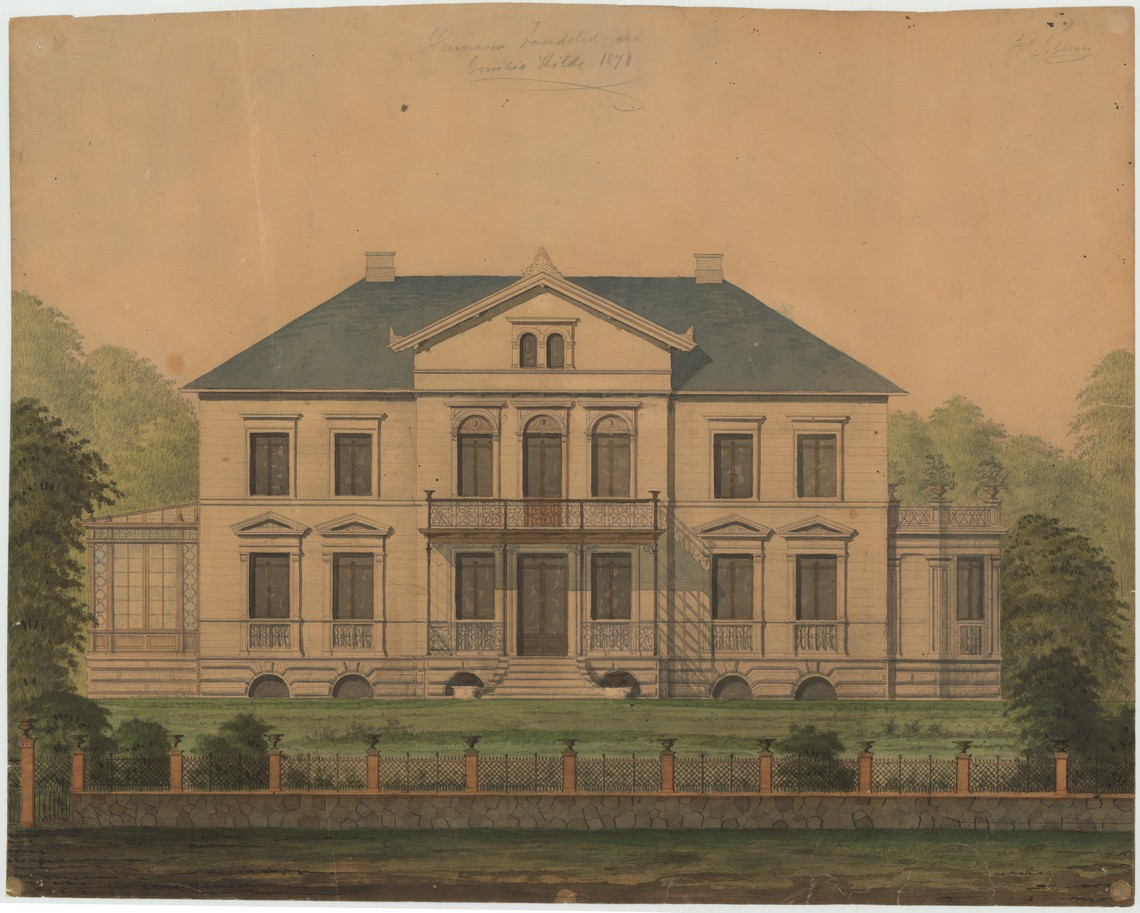
Drawing of the house by Henrik Steffens Sibbern from 1870

One of Belvedere's later owners was the financier and industrialist Isaac Wulff Heyman. He commissioned the architect Henrik Steffens Sibbern to adapt the building in 1870.

The property was purchased by Ilva-founder Hans Jørgen Linde in 1989. The house was subsequently put through a comprehensive renovation. It received an award from Gentofte Municipality in 1994. In 2011, Belvedere was purchased by Axcel-Managing Partner Christian Frigast.

== Architecture ==
The house has widen siding. It has a central projection topped by a verenda on the first floor.
