= Mogens Lassen =

Danish architect and designer

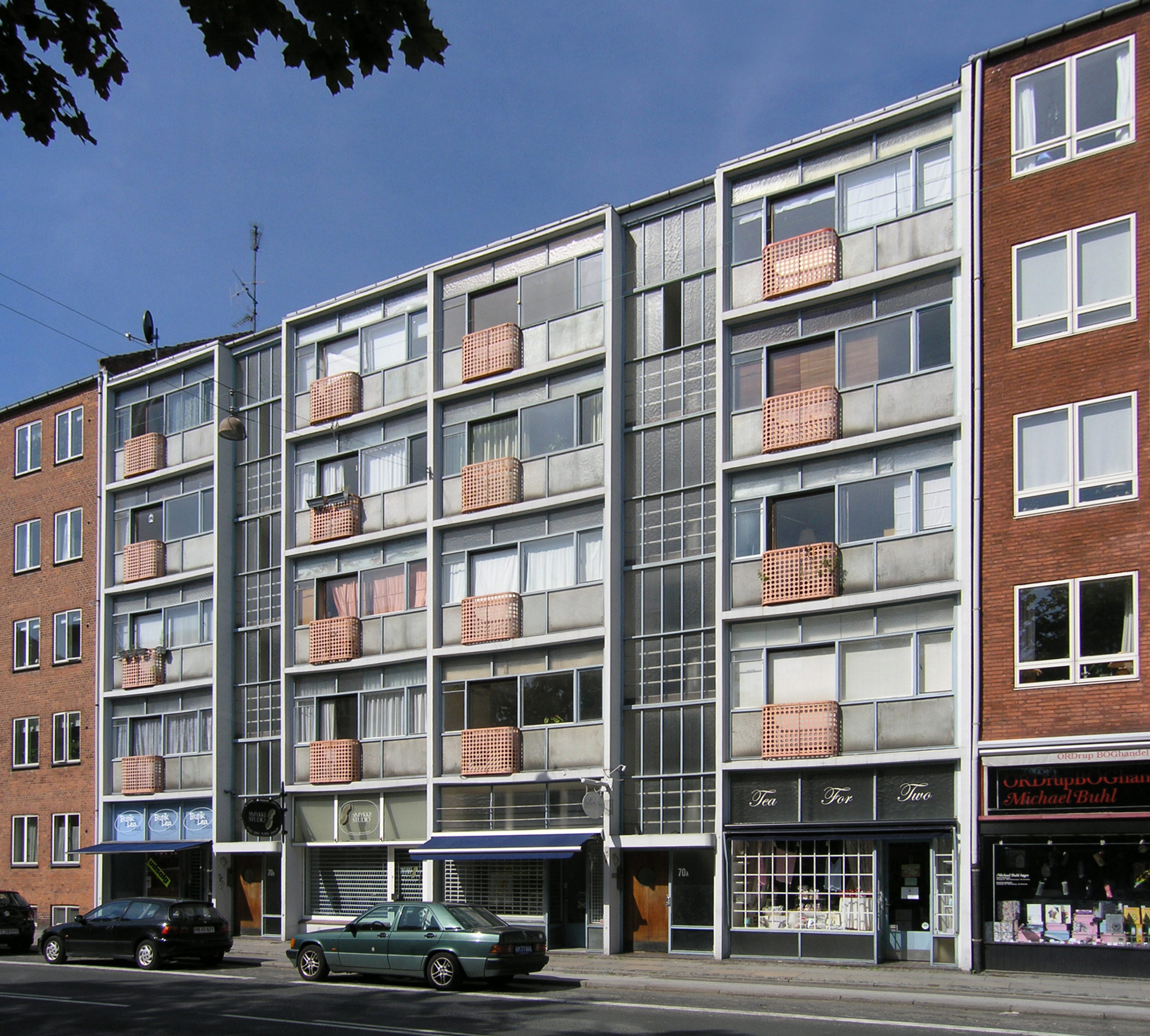
Systemhuset in Ordrup from 1937

Mogens Lassen (20 February 1901 – 14 December 1987) was a Modernist Danish architect and designer, working within the idiom of the International Style. He mainly designed residential buildings, both in the form of single-family houses and apartment blocks. He was the brother of Flemming Lassen, also an architect.

== Biography ==
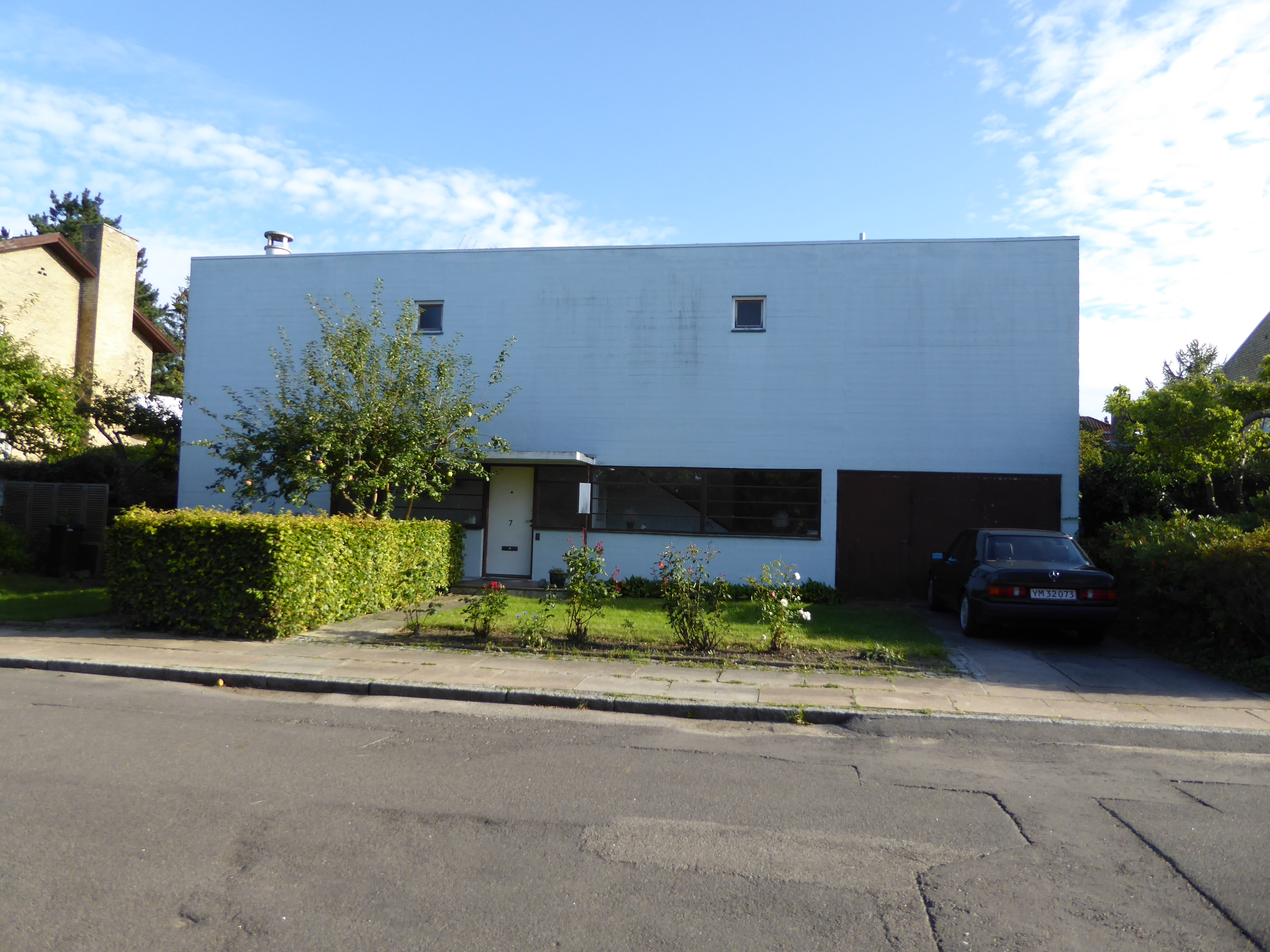
Bakkedal 7: House from 1934

Mogens Lassen was born on 20 February 1901 in Copenhagen into an artistic family. His father Hans Vilhelm Lassen was a decorative painter and his mother, Ingeborg Winding, was a painter. He trained as a mason before being admitted to the Royal Danish Academy of Fine Arts in 1923, but underwent further architectural training at various practices in Copenhagen, particularly with Tyge Hvass from 1925 to 1934. During a stay in Paris in 1927 to 1928, where he worked for the Danish company Christiani & Nielsen, he became acquainted with Le Corbusier's revolutionary works which inspired him to design innovative modern houses in reinforced concrete on his return to Denmark. He set up his own practice in 1935.

== Furniture ==
In addition to his architectural work, Lassen was also a keen furniture designer. As a result of his fine craftsmanship and his search for simplicity, his steel-based furniture from the 1930s added a new dimension to the modernist movement. His later designs in wood still form part of classical Danish Modern, especially his three-legged stool and folding Egyptian coffee table (1940) originally produced by A. J. Iversen.

== See also ==
- Functionalism (architecture)
- Architecture of Denmark
