= Lake Emdrup =

Lake in Copenhagen, Denmark

Emdrup Sø
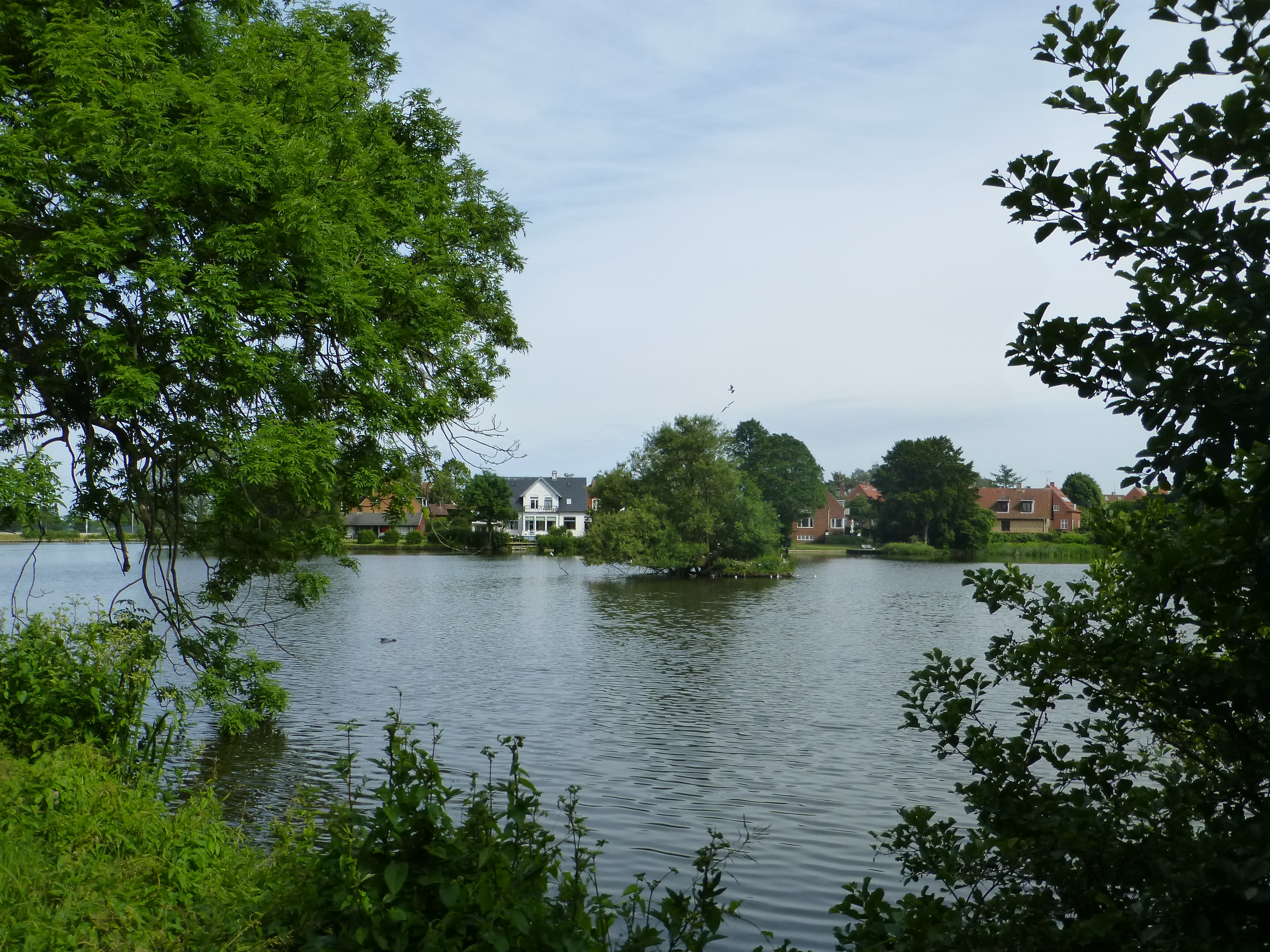
- Lake Emdrup

- Location within Copenhagen
- Location: Copenhagen
- Coordinates: 55°43′21″N 12°32′56″E
- Type: Artificial
- Primary outflows: Lygteåen
- Max. length: 8.4 km (5.2 mi)

Lake Emdrup (Danish: Emdrup Sø) is a lake located on the border between Copenhagen and Gentofte municipalities in the Emdrup area of northern Copenhagen, Denmark. It is fed mainly with water from Utterslev Mose to the west and Gentofte Lake to the north and drains into St. Jørgen's Lake in central Copenhagen through a system of pipes. The small Emdrup Lake Park is situated at the southwestern corner of the lake. The lake and park were protected by the Conservation Authority in 1963.

== History ==
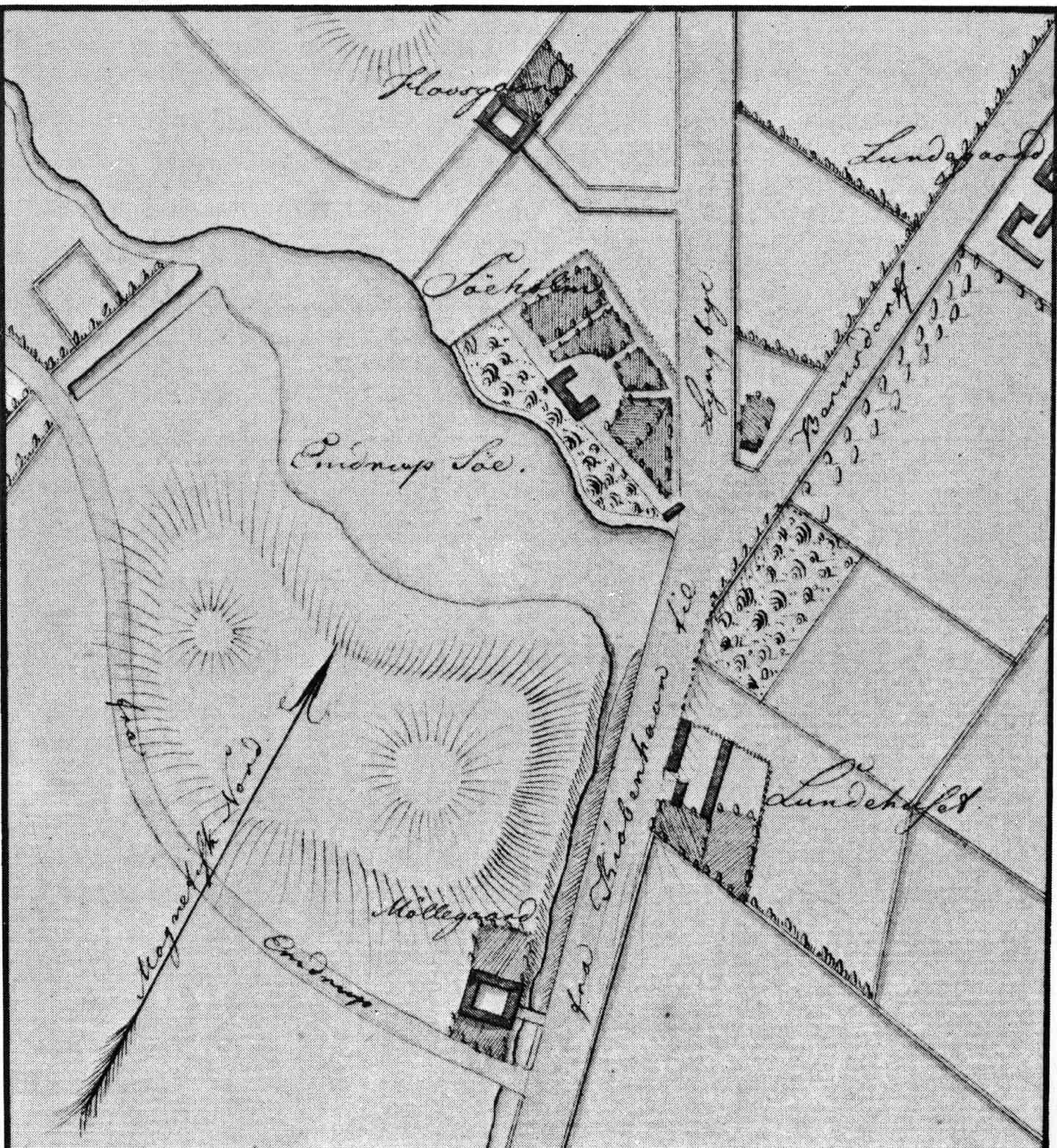
The lake seen on a map from the late 18th century.

The lake was created artificially when a dam was built on Emdrup Stream (Emdrup Bæk) to improve the supply of water to Copenhagen. The water was instead led through Lygteåen to the Ladegård Canal and into St. Jørgensen's Lake. Frederik II provided for the construction of a six km water tube from Lake Emdrup to the Gammeltorv marketplace. In 1608, Christian IV installed the Caritas Well on the square. The altitude difference being 9 metres, the water pressure was adequate for a fountain to be constructed. Though ornamental in character, the well was also part of the city's water supply system.

Lake Emdrup was long known as Lundehussøen after the Lundehus Kro, an inn located on Lyngbyvej. The Caritas Well which was installed on Gammeltorv in 1608, was fed with water from Lake Emdrup.

== The site ==
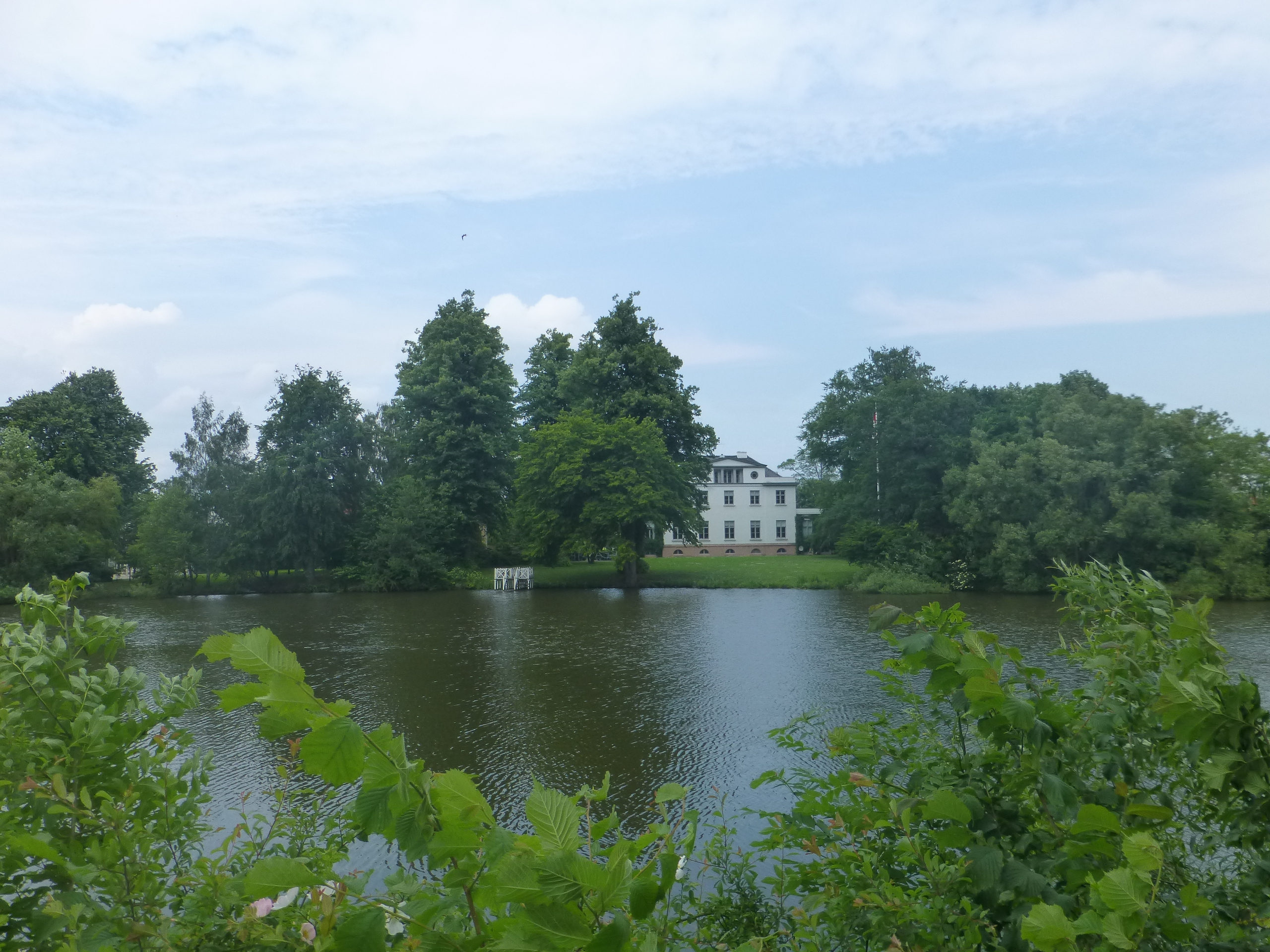
Søholm viewed from across the lake

It is situated in the triangular area between Tuborgvej to the west, Lyngbyvej to the east and Emdrupvej to the south. It is surrounded mostly by single-family detached homes. A listed Neoclassical house from the 1800s, Søholm, stands on the north shore of the lake.

== Ecology ==
The lake has a rich birdlife. Black-headed gulls occasionally breed in the trees on the island. Other common birds at the lake are greylag goose and tufted duck.

== Use ==
The lake is the site of an annual St. Hans' Eve celebration. On cold winters, it is used for skating. Bathing and fishing is prohibited.

== See also ==
- Damhus Lake
