= Holger Damgaard =

Danish photographer (1870–1945)

Holger Damgaard (24 July 1870 – 15 January 1945) was a Danish photographer. He was employed by Politiken from December 1908 as the first press photographer in Denmark. He was also a co-founder and the first president of the Danish Union of Press Photographers.

== Early life and education ==
Damgaard was born in Ribe, the son of bookseller Anton Jensen Damgaard (1838–85) and Marie Sophie Eriksen (born 1850). He received a commercial education in Varde and then travelled to New York City where he made a living for instance by teaching roller skating.

== Photography ==
In New York City, being an enthusiastic amateur photographer, Damgaard noticed the important role that press photographers played in American media. Back in Denmark, from 1900, he managed to sell a number of photographs to the weekly Hver 8. Dag. He was particularly fond of the autotypy technique which gained popularity in Denmark from around 1897. In December 1908, he convinced Henrik Cavling to introduce autotypy at Politiken. On 7 December 1908, a photograph by Damgaard featuring a group of children in front of a toy store became the first autotypy brought in a Danish newspaper. Damgaard was subsequently hired by Politiken on a permanent basis. Another major newspaper publisherDe Ferslewske Blade hired Th. Larsen, who would later work for Berlingske Tidende. Damgaard, Larsen and four other press photographers founded the Danish Union of Press Photographers in 1912 with Damgaard as its first president. He was known for his short response time, often arriving in his sports car, and for often climbing structures for the best angle, something that earned him the nickname tårnuglen ("The Tower Owl") among his colleagues. He retired at the age of 70 without having had a single sick day.

== Personal life ==
Damgaard married Ellen Karene Pauline Paulsen Samsøe (1 March 1879 – 25 Kune 1957). He died on 15 January 1945 in Ringsted and is buried in Solbjerg Cemetery.

== Legacy ==
More than 30,000 of Dangaard's negatives are now kept in the National Library of Denmark.
