= Søholm Row Houses =

Terrace house in Gentofte Municipality, Denmark

Coordinates: 55°46′29″N 12°35′30″E

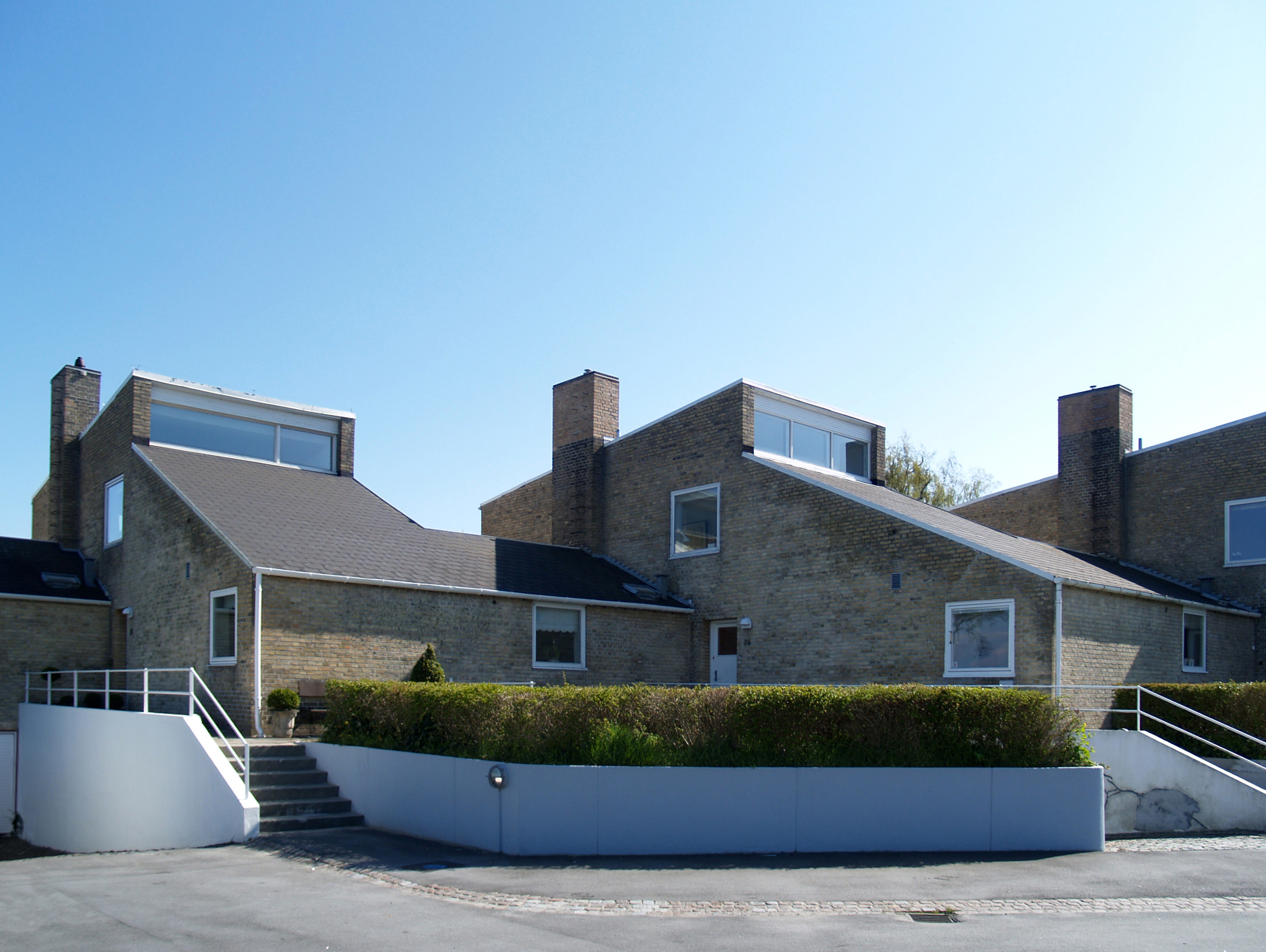
Houses in the Søholm I row

The Søholm Row Houses, designed by the Danish architect Arne Jacobsen in Klampenborg just north of Copenhagen, were completed in the late 1940s and early 1950s. Together with his Bellavista developments, the Søholm houses helped to establish Jacobsen's international reputation.

== Background ==
Completed in three stages between 1945 and 1954, the development consists of chained and terraced houses comprising a total of 18 units. For each stage, Jacobsen designed houses of different types: Søholm I to the south with five houses, Søholm II to the west with nine houses, and Søholm III to the north with four houses. The complex stands on the site of a former manor house from which it takes its name. The buildings are constructed in yellow brick with eternit roofing.

== Architecture ==
Unlike Jacobsen's white-plastered Functionalism in his Bellavista developments, Søholm reflects the post-war trend for more traditional brick construction which the architect Kay Fisker has called Functional Tradition as inspired by Peder Vilhelm Jensen-Klint's Grundtvig's Church which was also built of yellow brick.

=== Søholm I ===
The chained row in Søholm I is staggered and each of the five houses is separated from its neighbour by an intermediate building and a noticeable chimney. Their roofs are divided into two sections sloping in opposite directions by a vertical window in the middle, an innovative design that contributed to Jacobsen's international recognition. To optimize the view of the sea, each house has a living room located on the first floor with access to a balcony and with steps leading down into a dining room which consequently has an unusually high ceiling. From the kitchen, located on the ground floor level, there are stairs down to the cellar which also contains a garage.

In 1951, Arne Jacobsen himself moved into the house closest to the sea (located at Strandvejen 413) and lived there until his death in 1971. As he also used the house as his place of work, he added an extension to the Standvejen end for his design studio. There were no trees as they would have obscured the view. By contrast, he developed a picturesque garden with over 300 different plant varieties. The house was purchased by Realea in 2007 and fully restored. It is rented out on condition that it is open to the public a few times each year.

=== Søholm II ===
The Søholm II houses, situated further back from the sea, are divided into two wings in order to cater for a group of beautiful old plane trees on the site. Each house has 130 square metres of living space. The L-shaped living room on the ground floor has a fireplace and an adjoining kitchen. The bedrooms are on the first floor. The roofs here are also interesting in that they slope down past the balconies and windows in the east-facing niches.

=== Søholm III ===
The four houses in Søholm III are staggered in relation to each other and have only one storey so as not to spoil the view. The houses are deep rectangular boxes. The kitchen and hall are in the middle of the house. The staggering allows more natural light to come in through windows on the side. The living room is on the south side next to a sunken patio. The bedrooms on the northwest side are the highest rooms in the house as a result of the sloping roof. The facade consists of a glass and wooden frame between bearing walls of yellow brick.

== Assessment ==
According to a recent article in Fri, the Architectural Review commented: "What is particularly remarkable about the houses is the way the architect has transformed the usual two-facaded row houses into a three-dimensional composition with almost as many facets as a well polished diamond."

Peter Thule Kristensen from the Royal Danish Academy's School of Architecture comments: "The pitched roofs and yellow-brick facades of Søholm have also become an expression of Modernism which, even more than Bellavista's white-plastered Functionalism, draw on local Danish traditions."

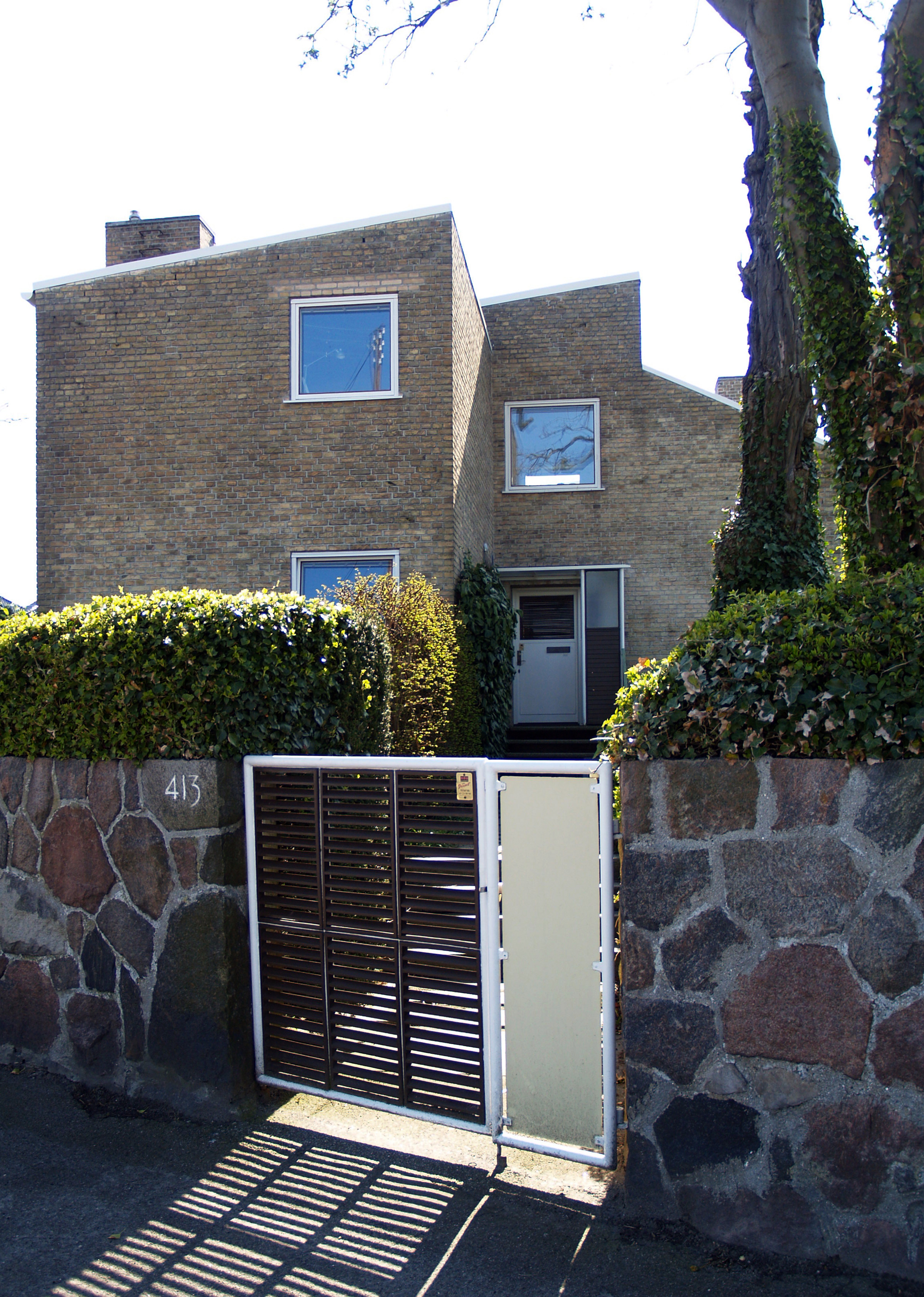
Arne Jacobsen's own house

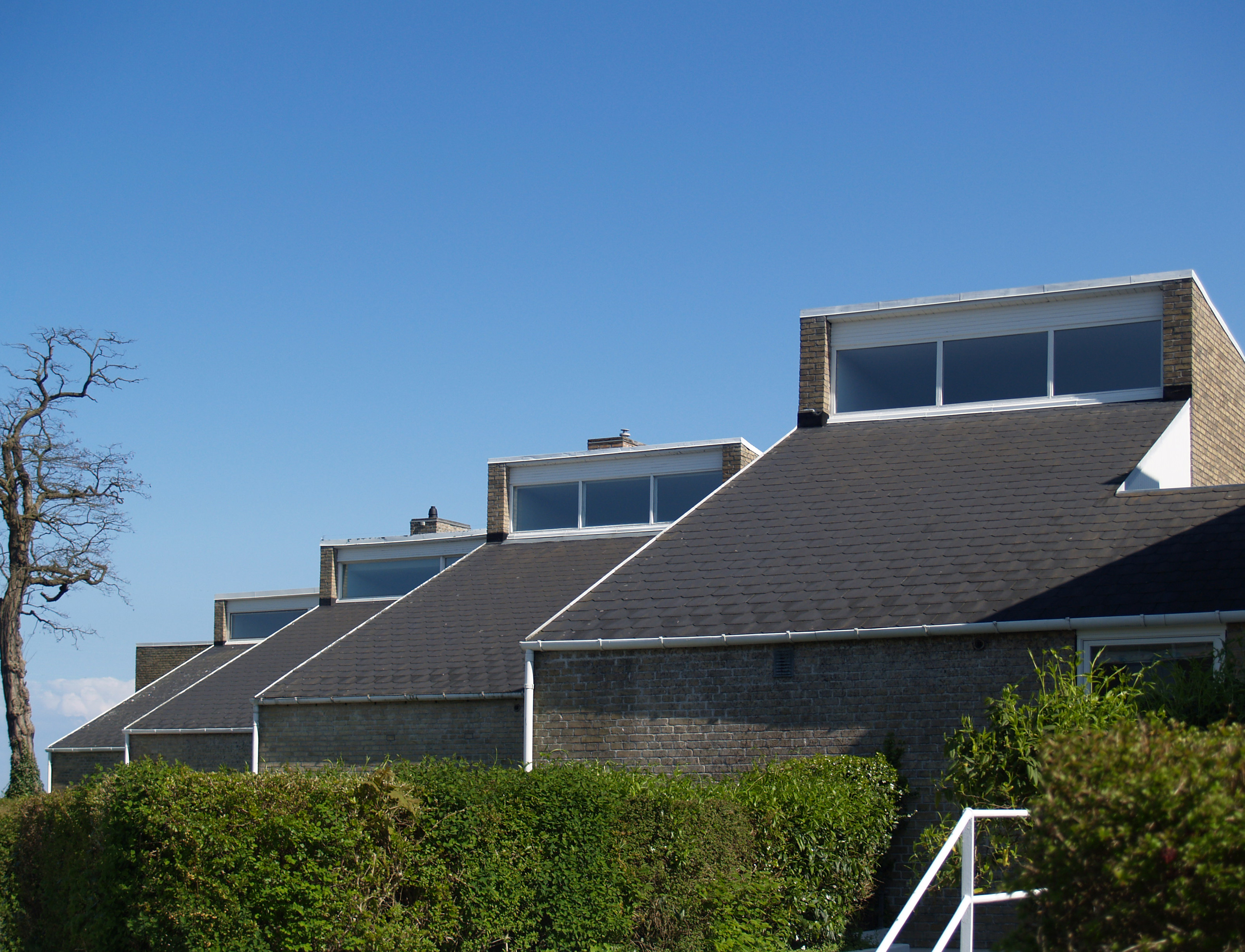
The five Søholm I houses (1950)

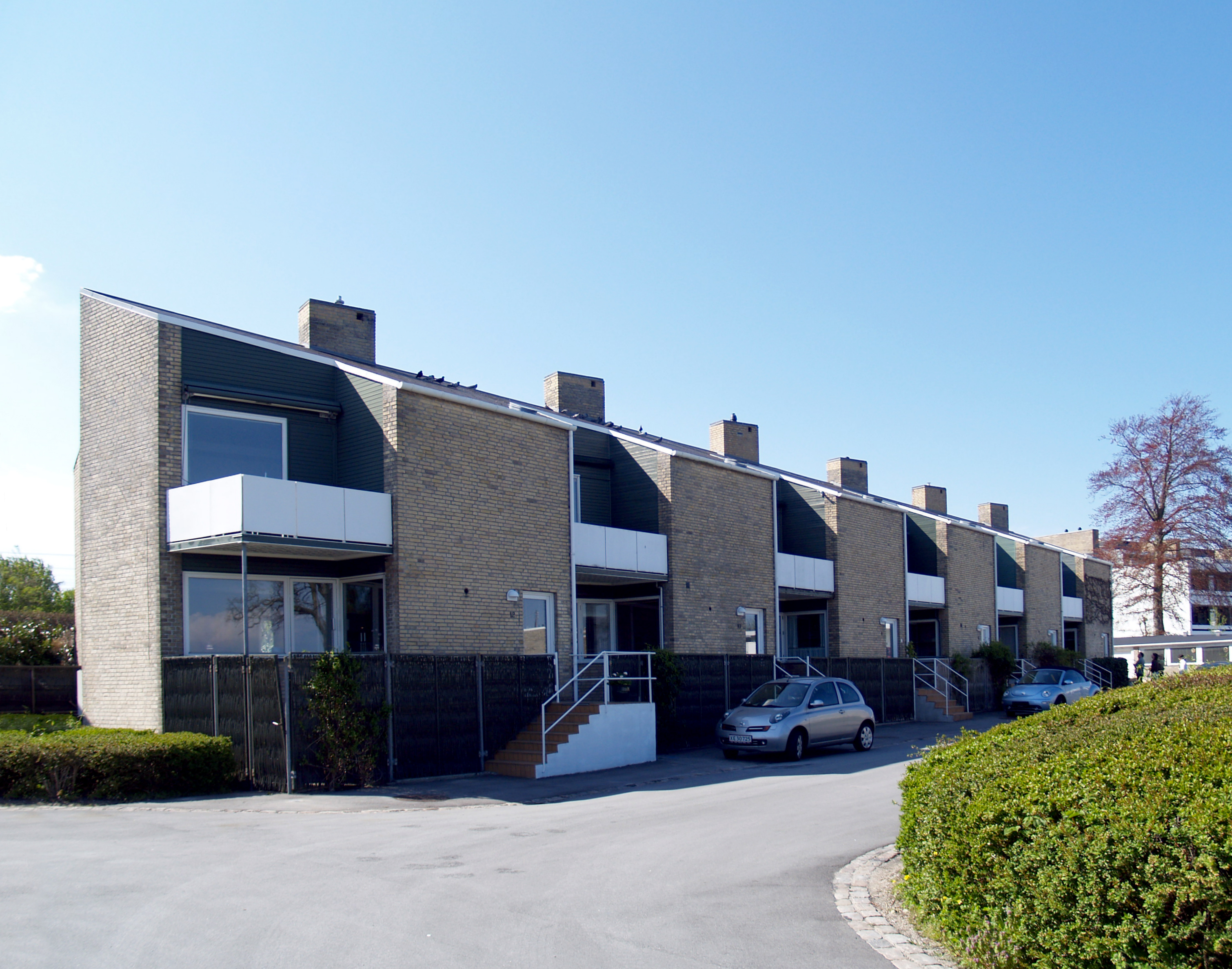
A row of Søholm II houses (1952)

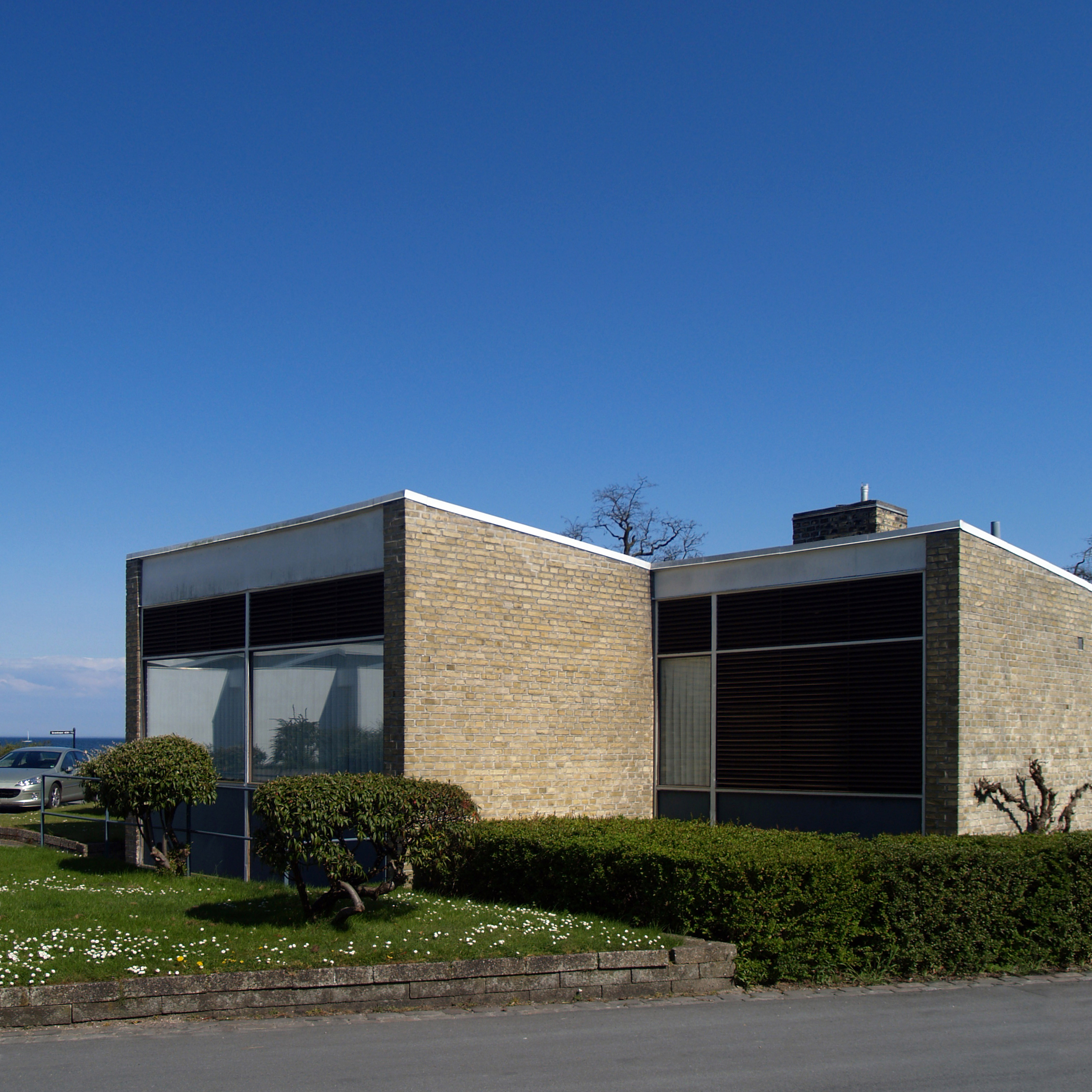
A Søholm III house (1954)

== Literature ==
- Thau, Carsten; Vindum, Kjeld: Arne Jacobsen, 2008, Copenhagen, Arkitektens forlag, 560 p. ISBN 978-87-7407-230-0
