= Christopher MacEvoy =

Christopher MacEvoy may refer to:

- Christopher MacEvoy Sr. (c. 1719–1792), Irish-born planter, landowner and merchant in the Danish West Indies
- Christopher MacEvoy Jr. (1760–1838), Danish merchant, landowner and planter
