= Taiwan and the United Nations =

Taiwan, officially known as the Republic of China, has not been a charter member of the United Nations (UN) since 1971. Historically, the Republic of China joined the United Nations as a founding member and was one of five permanent members of the Security Council until the People's Republic of China took the Chinese seat in 1971.

In recent years, Taiwan has sought to participate in the UN System in different forms, either as an observer in specialized agencies or as a formal member. Despite support from diplomatic allies and the United States, Taiwan's participation in the UN System has largely been denied or limited due to pressure from China.

== History ==
Republic of China

United Nations membership
- Membership: Former full member
- Dates: 24 October 1945 – 15 November 1971
- UNSC seat: Permanent
- Permanent Representatives: Guo Taiqi (first); Tsiang Tingfu; Liu Chieh (last)

Following World War II, the Big Four victors (China, Soviet Union, United Kingdom, United States) became founding members of the United Nations. The China seat was held by the Republic of China led by Chiang Kai-shek. The United Nations Charter, drafted in 1944, was ratified by representatives of 50 countries on 26 June 1945.

China, in recognition of its long-standing fight against aggression, was accorded the honor of being the first to sign the UN Charter. President Franklin Roosevelt had acknowledged China's war effort in World War II and stated his desire to allow China to "play its proper role in maintaining peace and prosperity" in the world. Thus, despite opposition from other leaders, especially Winston Churchill, China became a permanent member of the Security Council from its creation in 1945. At the same time, control of the island of Taiwan, which was under Japanese colonial rule, was handed over to the Republic of China (ROC) on 25 October 1945.

In 1949, the ROC government retreated to Taiwan, and the People's Republic of China (PRC) was established on mainland China. While the United States supported the ROC's claim to be the sole legitimate government of China, the Soviet Union was ally of the PRC. To protest the exclusion of the PRC, Soviet representatives boycotted the UN from January to August 1950.

Initially, the PRC boycotted or withdrew from international organizations in which Taiwan maintained continuing membership, including the Universal Postal Union and the World Meteorological Organization. This policy led to it becoming isolated from international bodies.

Japan formally relinquished claims to the islands of Taiwan and Penghu in the 1951 Treaty of San Francisco, which left the political status of the island unclear. Neither the PRC nor the ROC were invited to participate in the treaty due to the legitimacy dispute.

Starting from 1950, nations friendly to the PRC, such as the People's Republic of Albania, moved an annual resolution in the General Assembly to expel the "representatives of Chiang Kai-shek" (an implicit reference to the ROC) and permit the PRC to represent China at the UN. Although blocked every year, support for the PRC steadily grew. Worried about the trend, the United States began in 1961 to put forth a motion that required not just a simple majority but a two-thirds margin to rule on the matter of representation. Following the Indonesian withdrawal from the United Nations in 1965, the PRC reduced its efforts to enter the UN, but it soon resumed the diplomatic push for membership. A number of former colonies joining the UN, as well as better relations with western countries following the Sino-Soviet split, allowed the PRC to gain enough support that a supermajority was not needed for a decision on its membership. Opposition against the PRC and support for the ROC continued until 1970 when for the first time, a majority, but short of the supermajority requirement, voted in favor of the PRC. Compromise proposals to allow both Beijing and Taipei to participate in the UN, were rejected by both sides on account of the One-China policy.

In a Security Council meeting on 9 February 1971, Somalia objected to the credentials of the representative of Republic of China as the representative occupying the United Nations seat for China, and ROC and the United States responded that the question of China's representation should not be dealt with in the Security Council.

On 25 October 1971, United Nations General Assembly Resolution 2758 (XXVI) was passed, recognizing the People's Republic of China as the sole "legitimate representative of China to the United Nations" and expelling the "representatives of Chiang Kai-shek" from the UN. This was one of seven resolutions considered on the matter in October, and one of the three which were voted on. The resolution that ended up passing was a narrow one, dealing with the representation of "China" but otherwise putting aside the issue of Taiwan.

Following the passing of the resolution, the PRC has steadily gained increasing international influence. It has used this to strengthen its position in the UN, pushing an interpretation of Resolution 2758 that sees it as an affirmation by the UN of the One China principle. The PRC further enhanced its diplomatic efforts to cement the One China principle in the UN following the end of martial law in Taiwan and the introduction of democratic reforms in the late 1980s and 1990s. In particular, rhetoric began to shift following the 2000 Taiwanese presidential election, when the Kuomintang (KMT) lost the presidency of Taiwan to the more independent-minded Democratic Progressive Party (DPP).

Over the years following Resolution 2758, the PRC gained membership in a total of 21 international organizations, while Taiwan went from having membership in 39 organizations to having membership in 10. The date of PRC membership and Taiwanese withdrawal, or the eventual form of dual membership, was largely dependent on case-by-case processes unique to each organization. The switch was the slowest in financial and development institutions. Taiwan continued to maintain a policy of refusing to join an organization in which the PRC was a member ("the Chinese and the bandits would not co-exist") until the late 1980s, when it began to accept the concept of dual membership. The first tentative instance of dual membership was when the PRC was admitted to Interpol in 1984. Taiwan ceased participation, but did not formally withdraw. Continued Taiwanese participation in Interpol is limited by strict conditions imposed by the PRC, including being referred to as "Taiwan, China" and being officially being part of the Chinese delegation with no voting rights. In 1986, when China joined the Asian Development Bank, Taiwan continued its membership under the title of "Taipei, China". This relatively late PRC membership was due to resistance from the United States and Japan, which had significant influence in ADB and did not want Taiwan to become fully isolated. While ADB is a multilateral financial institution, it is not part of the UN system, and had a charter based on economic concerns rather than political ones.

Taiwan increased efforts to join the World Health Organization (WHO) during the 2002–2004 SARS outbreak. In 2003 UN Secretary-General Kofi Annan cited the One China policy as a reason to deny a Taiwanese representative from entering the UN headquarters, the first time a UN Secretary-General had referred to that policy. In 2005 the WHO signed an agreement with the PRC under which the WHO would communicate with Taiwan only through the PRC.

In 2008, UN Secretary-General Ban Ki-moon rejected a Taiwanese membership application.

The return of the KMT to power in Taiwan following the 2008 Taiwanese presidential election led to a rapproachment with China, and Taiwan began limited participation in some UN bodies, becoming an observer in the World Health Assembly and participating in an International Civil Aviation Organization triennial meeting.

In 2015, reports began to emerge of Taiwanese citizens being denied entry into UN buildings using an ROC passport, with incidents possibly going back to 2009. The 2016 Taiwanese presidential election brought the DPP back to power, and continued Taiwanese participation in UN bodies became contingent on Taiwan explicitly accepting the One China principle.

In July 2023, the United States House of Representatives passed the Taiwan International Solidarity Act, which sought to clarify that Resolution 2758 did not make any statements pertaining to Taiwan's sovereignty. In 2024, the Australian Senate and the Dutch House of Representatives passed motions clarifying the resolution in a similar manner.

As of June 2024, Taiwan's official policy position was that Resolution 2758 did not discuss Taiwan, and "the issue of Taiwan’s sovereignty or representation at the UN was beyond the resolution’s purview."

In 2024, a Taiwanese man living in China was sentenced to nine years in prison for having previously supported Taiwan's inclusion at the UN, a crime under Chinese laws introduced that same year.

== Membership bids ==
In 1993, the ROC began campaigning to rejoin the UN. A number of options were considered, including seeking membership in the specialized agencies, applying for observer status, applying for full membership, or having resolution 2758 revoked to reclaim the seat of China in the UN.

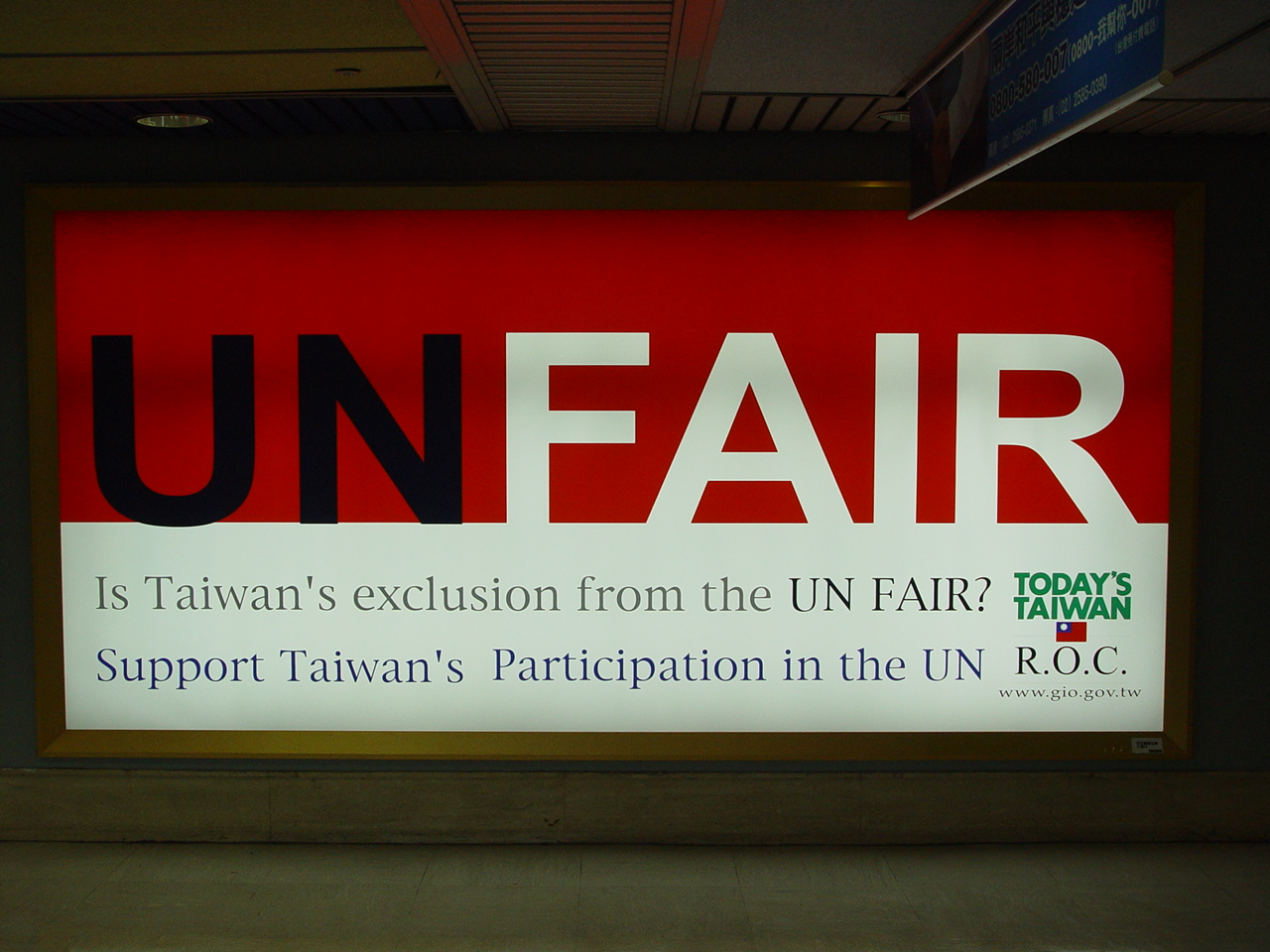
Sign at the Taoyuan International Airport calling for Taiwan's inclusion in the UN in 2005

Every year from 1993 to 2006, UN member states submitted a memorandum to the UN Secretary-General requesting that the UN General Assembly consider allowing the ROC to resume participating in the United Nations. This approach was chosen, rather than a formal application for membership, because it could be enacted by the General Assembly, while a membership application would need Security Council approval, where the PRC held a veto. Early proposals recommended admitting the ROC with parallel representation over China, along with the People's Republic of China, pending eventual reunification, citing examples of other divided countries which had become separate UN member states, such as East and West Germany and North and South Korea. Later proposals emphasized that the ROC was a separate state, over which the PRC had no effective sovereignty. These proposed resolutions referred to the ROC under a variety of names: "Republic of China in Taiwan" (1993–94), "Republic of China on Taiwan" (1995–97, 1999–2002), "Republic of China" (1998), "Republic of China (Taiwan)" (2003) and "Taiwan" (2004–06).

However, all fourteen attempts were unsuccessful as the General Assembly's General Committee declined to put the issue on the Assembly's agenda for debate, under strong opposition from the PRC.

While all these proposals were vague, requesting the ROC be allowed to participate in UN activities without specifying any legal mechanism, in 2007 the ROC submitted a formal application under the name "Taiwan" for full membership in the UN. On 15 September 2007, over 3,000 Taiwanese Americans and their supporters rallied in front of the UN building in New York City, and over 300,000 Taiwanese people rallied in Taiwan, all in support of Taiwan joining the UN. Taiwan also won the backing of many Members of the European Parliament on this issue. However, the application was rejected by the United Nations Office of Legal Affairs citing General Assembly Resolution 2758, without being forwarded to the Security Council. Secretary-General of the United Nations Ban Ki-moon stated that:

The position of the United Nations is that the People's Republic of China is representing the whole of China as the sole and legitimate representative Government of China. The decision until now about the wish of the people in Taiwan to join the United Nations has been decided on that basis. The resolution (General Assembly Resolution 2758) that you just mentioned is clearly mentioning that the Government of China is the sole and legitimate Government and the position of the United Nations is that Taiwan is part of China.

Responding to the UN's rejection of its application, the ROC government has stated that Taiwan is not now nor has it ever been under the jurisdiction of the PRC, and that since General Assembly Resolution 2758 did not clarify the issue of Taiwan's representation in the UN, it does not prevent Taiwan's participation in the UN as an independent sovereign nation. The ROC argued that Resolution 2758 merely transferred the UN seat from the ROC to the PRC, but did not address the issue of Taiwan's representation in the UN. The ROC government also criticized Ban for asserting that Taiwan is part of China and returning the application without passing it to the Security Council or the General Assembly, contrary to UN's standard procedure (Provisional Rules of Procedure of the Security Council, Chapter X, Rule 59). The ROC emphasized that the United Nations has never taken a formal stance regarding the sovereignty of Taiwan. On the other hand, the PRC government, which has stated that Taiwan is part of China and firmly opposes the application of any Taiwan authorities to join the UN either as a member or an observer, praised that UN's decision "was made in accordance with the UN Charter and Resolution 2758 of the UN General Assembly, and showed the UN and its member states' universal adherence to the one-China principle". A group of UN member states put forward a draft resolution for that autumn's UN General Assembly calling on the Security Council to consider the application.

Ban Ki-moon also came under fire for this statement from the United States via non-official channels. There are unconfirmed reports that Ban's comments prompted the US to restate its position regarding the status of Taiwan. A Heritage Foundation article suggests that the US may have presented a démarche stating among others that:

If the UN Secretariat insists on describing Taiwan as a part of the PRC, or on using nomenclature for Taiwan that implies such status, the United States will be obliged to disassociate itself on a national basis from such position."

The Wall Street Journal criticized Ban Ki-moon for rejecting Taiwan's July 2007 application and regarded Ban's interpretation of Resolution 2758 (that Taiwan was part of China) as erroneous. Nevertheless, Secretary-General Ban Ki-Moon's statement reflected long-standing UN convention to deny the ROC representation and is mirrored in other documents promulgated by the United Nations. For example, the UN's "Final Clauses of Multilateral Treaties, Handbook", 2003 (a publication which predated his tenure in Office) states:

[r]egarding the Taiwan Province of China, the Secretary-General follows the General Assembly's guidance incorporated in resolution 2758 (XXVI)of the General Assembly of 25 October 1971 on the restoration of the lawful rights of the People's Republic of China in the United Nations. The General Assembly decided to recognize the representatives of the Government of the People's Republic of China as the only legitimate representatives of China to the United Nations. Hence, instruments received from the Taiwan Province of China will not be accepted by the Secretary-General in his capacity as depositary.

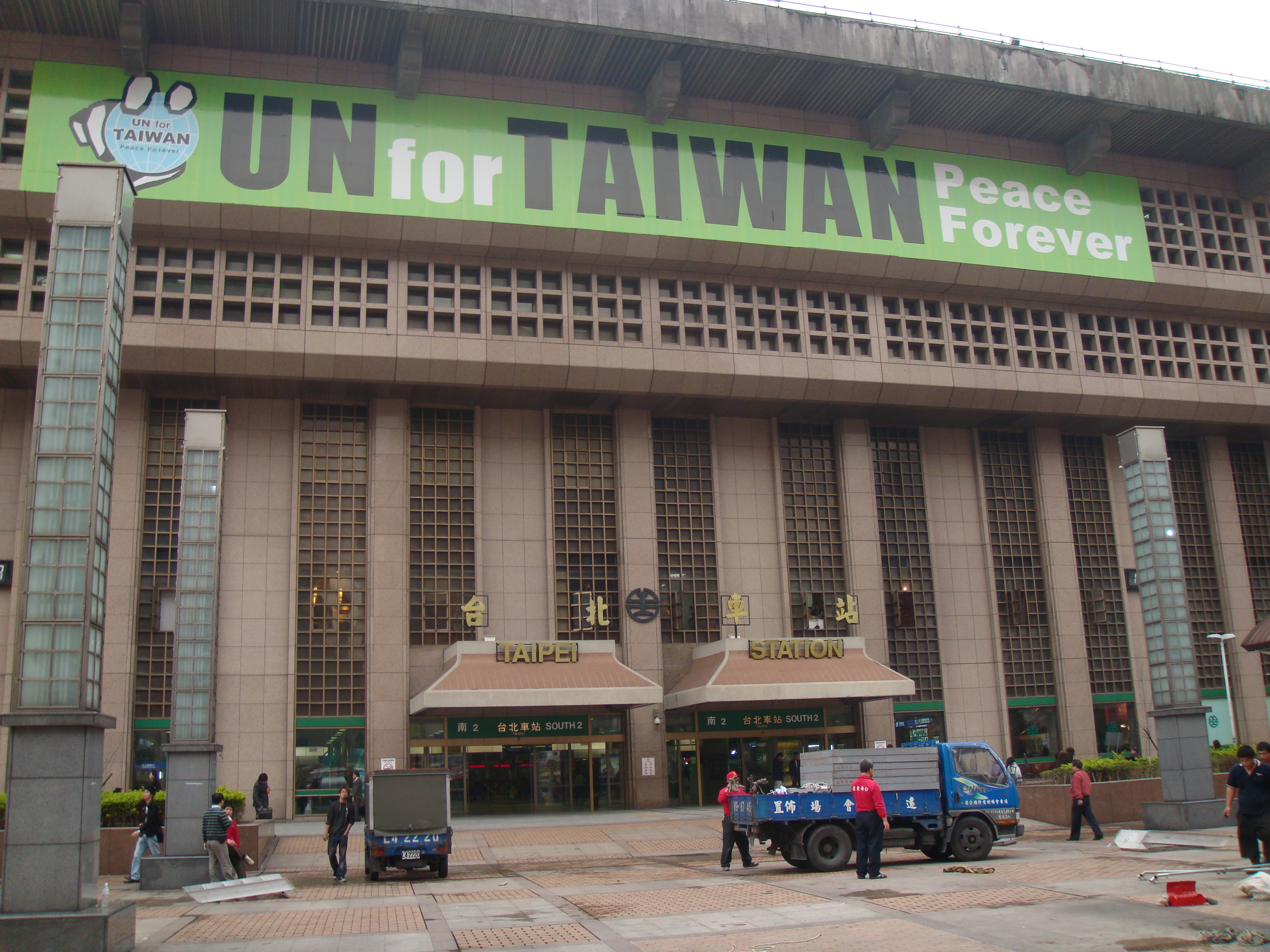
UN for Taiwan banner at the Taipei Main Station in 2008

In 2008, two referendums on joining the UN failed because of low voter participation. That fall, Taiwan took a new approach, with its allies submitting a resolution requesting that the "Republic of China (Taiwan)" be allowed to have "meaningful participation" in the UN specialized agencies. Again, the issue was not put on the Assembly's agenda when the United Nations subcommittee ruled it would not let the General Assembly consider the ROC's application to join UN activities. Shortly after this, the United States and the national governments of the European Union expressed their support for "Taiwan" (none of them recognises the ROC) to have "meaningful participation" in UN specialized agencies, such as the World Health Organization. In May 2009, Taiwan's Department of Health was invited by the World Health Organization to attend the 62nd World Health Assembly as an observer under the name "Chinese Taipei". This was Taiwan's first participation in an event organized by a UN-affiliated agency since 1971.

In 2009, Taiwan chose not to bring the issue of its participation in the UN up for debate at the General Assembly for the first time since it began the campaign in 1993.

In 2016, under President Tsai Ing-wen, Taiwan asked its allies to send a letter to the UN secretary-general asking that Taiwan be included in the World Health Organization, the air security-focused International Civil Aviation Organization, and the United Nations Framework Convention on Climate Change.

In 2018, the Taiwanese foreign ministry summarized a multi-pronged campaign in which the Republic of China (Taiwan) government sought to participate in the UN. In addition to voicing support at the UN general debate, several allies including Belize and Eswatini submitted a joint letter to UN Secretary-General António Guterres to express strong support of Taiwan's participation in the UN System.

=== Support ===
In September 2011, Tuvaluan Prime Minister Willy Telavi made a statement at the 66th session of the United Nations General Assembly (UNGA). In the statement, Telavi stated:

Mr, President, our collective efforts to strengthen and maintain peace across the globe will be meaningless if the United Nations continue to turn blind eyes and deaf ears to Taiwan's contribution and efforts toward this common goal. Further, Taiwan's continued contribution to the international community as one of the committed development partners cannot be overemphasised. In this regard, Tuvalu strongly urges the United Nations to recognise such contribution without any reservations. In particular, Tuvalu calls upon the UN subsidiary bodies especially the World Health Organization, International Civil Aviation Organization (ICAO) and the United Nations Framework Convention on Climate Change (UNFCCC), to allow Taiwan to fully participate meaningfully in their meetings and activities.

In 2014, Saint Lucian foreign minister Alva Baptiste made a plea at the 69th session of the UNGA for a fuller participation of Taiwan in the UN System, stating that "Taiwan has the experience of engaging in a technological revolution that has enhanced its economic development and the welfare of its people; and in many respects, that State has become a viable economic development model for small states."

In October 2021, United States Secretary of State Antony Blinken released a statement supporting Taiwan's meaningful participation in the United Nations System, noting Taiwan's current exclusion "undermines the important work of the UN and its related bodies."

In September 2023, UN Deputy Secretary-General Amina Mohammed was asked about Taiwan's exclusion and said, “Every person matters, whether it's Taiwan or otherwise. And I think it's really important for member states to find a solution.” Coinciding with the UN General Assembly in 2023, a parade in New York City was held in support of Taiwan's inclusion, with participants holding banners “UN for Taiwan” or “Keep Taiwan Free.” Addressing the 78th session of the UN General Assembly, the presidents of Palau, Guatemala, and Paraguay voiced support for Taiwan's inclusion in the UN.

In August 2024, former U.S. ambassador to the UN Nikki Haley visited Taiwan and said that it should be a full member of the UN.

=== Opposition ===
China has consistently opposed Taiwan's entry into the UN. In 2006, Chinese foreign ministry spokesperson Jiang Yu posited, "there is only one China in the world and Taiwan, as part of China, is not qualified to join the United Nations." In a 2007 news conference, Taiwan Affairs Office spokesperson Yang Yi said, "The purpose of the move is to provoke disputes between the two sides" and that Beijing had "great determination to maintain the integrity of our territory, and we have the necessary preparation to contain any activities concerning Taiwan independence." In September that year, China Daily reported that 126 countries supported its position on the Taiwan issue.

The United States has also at times opposed Taiwan's efforts to join the U.N. as a State member, calling the island's 2008 referendum a "step towards a declaration of independence" and an "alteration of the status quo".

In response to U.S. support in 2021 for Taiwan's meaningful participation in the UN, Chinese official Ma Xiaoguang said that Taiwan “has no right to join the United Nations” and made the assertion that “Taiwan is a part of China.”

== Other UN functions ==
Membership in international organizations as of 2013
| Institution | ROC withdrawal | PRC membership |
|---|---|---|
| United Nations and United Nations Security Council | 1971 | 1971 |
| International Civil Aviation Organization | 1971 | 1971 |
| International Labour Organization | 1971 | 1971 |
| UNESCO | 1971 | 1971 |
| International Bureau of Education | 1971 | 1971 |
| Intergovernmental Oceanographic Commission | 1974 | 1971 |
| United Nations Development Programme | 1971 | 1972 |
| Intergovernmental Maritime Consultative Organization | 1971 | 1973 |
| United Nations High Commissioner for Refugees | 1971 | 1976 |
| United Nations Children's Fund | 1971 | 1979 |
| International Atomic Energy Agency | 1971 | 1984 |
| International Telecommunication Union | 1972 | 1972 |
| Universal Postal Union | 1972 | 1972 |
| World Meteorological Organization | 1972 | 1972 |
| World Health Organization | 1972 | 1972 |
| Asian Industrial Development Council | 1972 | 1972 |
| Asian and Pacific Council | 1973 | 1973 |
| Permanent Court of Arbitration | 1973 | 1973 |
| Asian-Pacific Postal Union | 1975 | 1975 |
| International Hydrographic Organization | 1977 | 1977 |
| International Monetary Fund | 1980 | 1980 |
| International Bank for Reconstruction and Development | 1980 | 1980 |
| International Development Association | 1980 | 1980 |
| International Finance Corporation | 1980 | 1980 |
| International Committee of Military Medicine and Pharmacy | 1989 | 1990 |
| Interpol | Suspended | 1984 |
| Asian Development Bank | N/A | 1986 |
| International Seed Testing Association | N/A | 1989 |
| International Office of Epizootics | N/A | 1992 |

UN bodies often have an equivalent of UN Resolution 2758 which they cite to exclude Taiwan from participation. Examples are Resolution 693 of the International Telecommunication Union, and the 9th Decision adopted by the 88th Session of the UNESCO Executive Board.

=== Committee on NGOs ===
The PRC also exerts its influence to block the participation of NGOs and other entities in the UN if they treat Taiwan as separate to China. Like other sitting members on the United Nations Committee on Non-Governmental Organizations, China can hold up applications from prospective participants. It has requested that the committee ask non-governmental organizations (NGOs) to follow its preferred terminology of "Taiwan, Province of China." An American Catholic school in 2021 changed and eventually dropped references to Taiwan in a year-old article before receiving approval to attend the United Nations Commission on the Status of Women.

=== Framework Convention on Climate Change ===
Taiwan is not party to the United Nations Framework Convention on Climate Change (UNFCCC) and does not officially participate in UN's climate summit events. Despite its exclusion from UN climate talks and from global emissions data, Taiwan discloses its emissions data publicly and publishes its own emissions-cutting plans in line with the Paris Agreement.

In 2023, Taiwanese government-funded Industrial Technology Research Institute attended COP28 as an observer and held 46 bilateral meetings with officials from 35 governments. Twelve of Taiwan's diplomatic allies and 42 international parliaments sent letters to UNFCCC Executive Secretary Simon Stiell urging the global community to include Taiwan in mechanisms related to the UNFCCC and the Paris Agreement. German foreign minister Annalena Baerbock said that "she believed it was most important that everyone—whether they hailed from Germany, Samoa, the Marshall Islands, Colombia, or Taiwan—thought of their families at this critical moment and what their families would ask when they returned home."

=== International Civil Aviation Organization ===
In 2013, Taiwan was for the first time invited to attend the International Civil Aviation Organization (ICAO) Assembly, at its 38th session, as a guest under the name of “Chinese Taipei.” As of September 2019, it has not been invited to participate again, due to renewed PRC pressure. The Canadian government supported Taiwan's inclusion in ICAO. Support also came from Canada's commercial sector with the president of the Air Transport Association of Canada saying in 2019 that "It's about safety in aviation so from a strictly operational and non-political point of view, I believe Taiwan should be there."

In January 2020, ICAO blocked the Twitter accounts of scholars, policy analysts, and congressional staffers who asked whether the ICAO would include Taiwan in COVID-19 planning and logistics.

In September 2022, United States Secretary of Transportation Pete Buttigieg supported Taiwan's participation at the ICAO assembly, saying, “We believe that all of international civil aviation’s important stakeholders -- particularly those who administer critical airspace, like Taiwan -- should have the opportunity to participate meaningfully in ICAO’s work.”

=== International Monetary Fund ===
The PRC initially sought membership in the IMF and the expulsion of Taiwan in 1973. World Bank President Robert McNamara indicated that PRC membership would be considered, but did not address the question of Taiwanese participation. Another push for membership took place in 1976, which was defeated because of the IMF's weighted voting system, which gave more power to Taiwan's allies than a one country one vote system. Better relations between the PRC and the United States and Japan led to membership to both the IMF and the World Bank in 1980.

Taiwan was ejected from the International Monetary Fund (IMF) in 1980, but it is listed on some IMF indices as “Taiwan Province of China.”

In January 2023, U.S. Congresswoman Young Kim, along with Congressman Al Green, introduced the Taiwan Non-Discrimination Act. The bill would require actions from the U.S. governor of the IMF to advocate for Taiwan's admission into the IMF. The bill passed the House on 12 January 2024 and states it is the sense of the Congress that:

The experience of Taiwan in developing a vibrant and advanced economy under democratic governance and the rule of law should inform the work of the international financial institutions, including through increased participation by Taiwan in the institutions.

=== World Health Organization ===
Taiwan's limited participation in the World Health Organization was as an observer in the World Health Assembly (WHA) from 2009 to 2016, under the designation "Chinese Taipei". China, which claims Taiwan as its own territory but does not administer health policy across the Strait, blocked it from participating in the assembly following the election of Tsai Ing-wen as president in 2016.

WHA Resolution 25.1 serves as the WHO's equivalent of Resolution 2758, and is cited as the reason for denying Taiwanese participation.

Due to Taiwan's successful response to the COVID-19 pandemic, its inclusion in the WHO gained international attention in 2020, with strong support from the United States, Japan, Germany and Australia.

In May 2023, the WHA again rejected Taiwan's request to join its annual meeting as an observer due to pressure from China. Taiwan's inclusion was supported by the United States, United Kingdom, France, Australia, Lithuania, Japan, Canada, the Czech Republic, Germany, as well as Taiwan's formal diplomatic allies including the Marshall Islands and Belize. In addition, the Formosa Club, a platform for European and Canadian legislators, jointly with 926 lawmakers from 29 countries, signed a letter urging WHO Secretary-General Tedros Adhanom Ghebreyesus to invite Taiwan to participate as an observer in the WHA.

Ahead of the 2024 WHA, United States Secretary of State Antony Blinken urged the WHO to invite Taiwan to participate as an observer, stating that inviting Taiwan is “a critically important step toward affirming the WHO’s goal of ‘Health for All.’” Taiwanese health and welfare minister Chiu Tai-yuan led a bipartisan delegation to Geneva to urge the WHO to include Taiwan as an observer. Vice president of the Legislative Yuan Johnny Chiang also led a parliamentary delegation in support of Taiwan’s inclusion in the WHA.

In 2025, Italian foreign minister Antonio Tajani stated that the WHO made a mistake by excluding Taiwanese scientists during the COVID pandemic.

== Civil society organizations ==
In 2003, civil society organization Taiwan United Nations Alliance (TAIUNA; Chinese: 台灣聯合國協進會) was established to promote the entrance of Taiwan into the United Nations. Members of the organization make annual trips to the United States to meet with legislators and representatives to the UN from Taiwan's diplomatic allies. In addition to pushing for Taiwan's inclusion in the UN, the TAIUNA has also expressed its hope that Taiwan's participation in the World Health Assembly and the Olympic Games as "Chinese Taipei" could be changed in the future.

In 2017, TAIUNA leader and former defense minister Michael Tsai led a group of 25 TAIUNA members to the United States to meet with officials and thinktanks as well as protest the Chinese Consulate General in New York City, the 14th annual trip taken by the organization. In 2023, Alliance of Democracies Foundation executive director Jonas Parello-Plesner wrote an opinion piece in Politico to call for the UN to recognize Taiwan's voice.

== Denial of entry to UN events ==
In May 2012, the WHO Promotional Group from Taiwan was denied entry to the public gallery at the World Health Assembly, the Taiwanese who presented their passports instead of their national IDs were rejected because the WHO staff told them they did not accept Taiwanese passports.

In 2015, Tsai Yu-ling, a Taiwanese national who wished to join a daily guided tour at the UN headquarters in Geneva, was denied entry after she showed her Taiwan passport. According to Tsai, the UN staff member asked her to present a Chinese passport and Chinese ID card. Tsai said that since she was not a Chinese citizen, it would be impossible for her to own a Chinese passport or a Chinese ID, adding that asking for a passport that did not exist was a form of discrimination. According to the Taiwanese foreign ministry, a Taiwanese man encountered the same problem when he wanted to enter the building using his ROC passport. The UN had previously barred Taiwanese national Lin Jing-yi Lin from attending an official satellite meeting of UN's Commission on the Status of Women held in New York because she held a Taiwanese passport.

In 2016, the UN reportedly turned Taiwanese tourists away from its New York headquarters, in what an analyst characterized as "absurd behavior."

In October 2018, the foreign ministry criticized the UN for its discriminatory treatment of Taiwanese passport holders after reports that even holders of a Chinese travel document were refused entry.

In March 2023, several journalists pressed UN spokesperson of the secretary-general Stephane Dujarric on the exclusion of Taiwanese visitors to the UN headquarters in New York. Irish Times reporter Yvonne Murray and Al Jazeera reporter James Bays both asked about the policy to deny Taiwanese people entry into UN buildings for tours or meetings, with Bays further observing, "It seems to me all of these people are citizens of the world. And I wouldn't have thought that the secretary-general is someone who wants to practice discrimination." During a separate press conference, French reporter Celhia De Lavarene revisited the issue and asked Dujarric if China was running the UN.

Two accredited journalists from Taiwan's Central News Agency (CNA) were denied entry to the World Health Assembly in Geneva on 22 May 2023, prompting calls from the International Federation of Journalists (IFJ) and its affiliate, the Association of Taiwan Journalists (ATJ), on the United Nations and its affiliate organizations to respect press freedom and allow unrestricted access to all journalists regardless of nationality. Reporters Without Borders (RSF) also made a statement:

Refusing journalists' accreditation based on their nationality or the geographical location of their media registration is clearly discriminatory and against the public's right to information. We call on the United Nations to open its events to all journalists and media, regardless of their geographic origin.

A UN spokesperson wrote to Voice of America that "the United Nations headquarters are open to individuals in possession of identification from a State recognized by the UN General Assembly." According to RSF, Taiwanese reporters had an easier time internationally between 2009 and 2016, but that ended in 2017.

In May 2024, the same two reporters who were denied entry the year prior were asked to provide an official Chinese passport by the media credentials review committee. The IFJ again called on the UN to fulfill its commitment to press freedom.

== See also ==
- 2008 Taiwanese United Nations membership referendum
- Foreign relations of Taiwan
- Taiwanese nationalism
