= Fritz Schur =

Fritz H. Schur
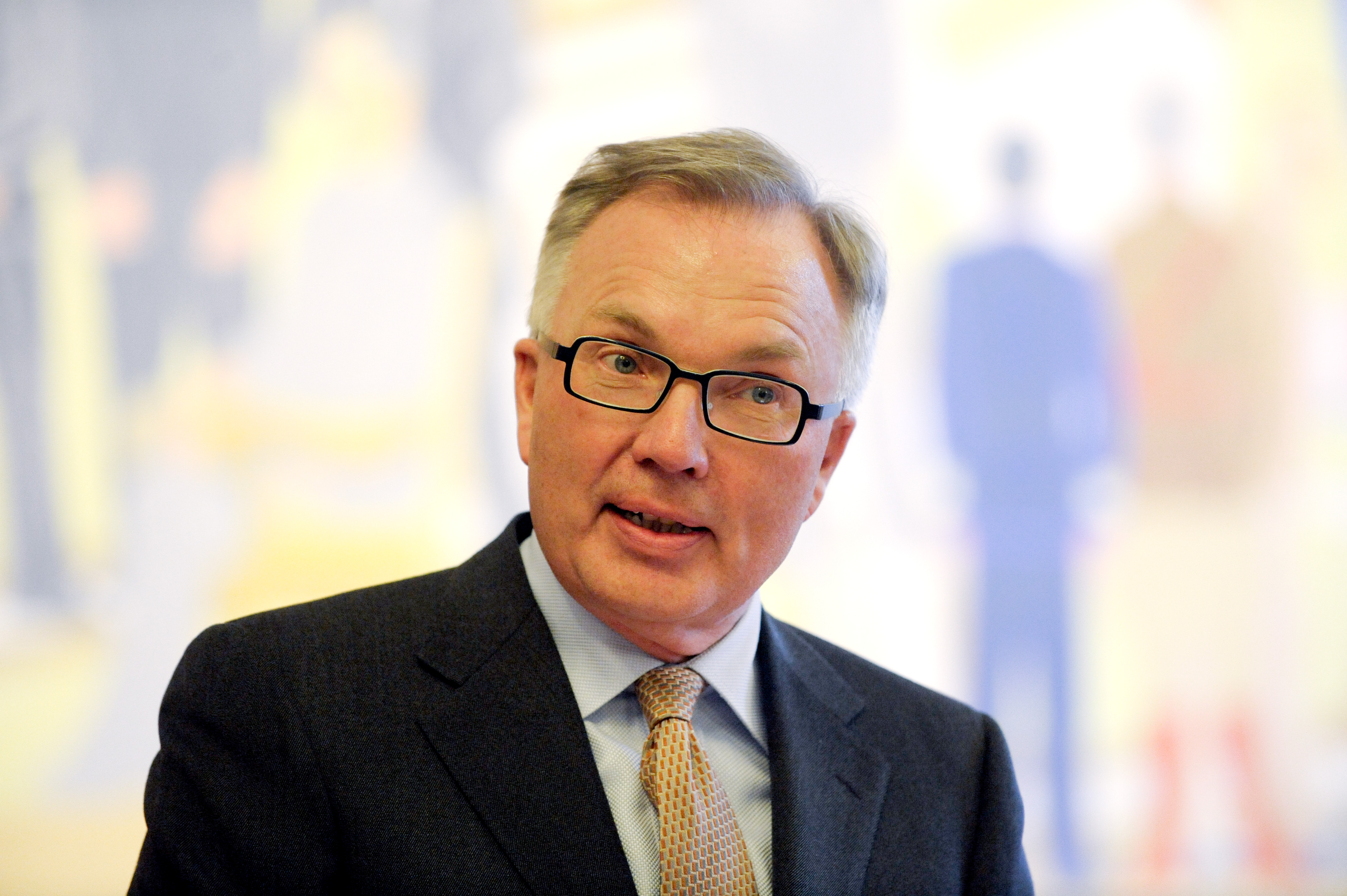
- Fritz Schur
- Born: Fritz Henrik Schur Jr; 27 November 1951 (age 74); Vejle, Denmark
- Occupation: Businessman

Fritz Henrik Schur Junior (born 27 November 1951) is a Danish businessman with ties to both royal, business and political circles in Denmark. Fritz Schur has since 1999 been honorary consul general of Finland to Denmark.

== Early life and education ==
Schur was born in Vejle on 27 November 1951. He is fifth generation of a wealthy merchant family. He grew up in Gentofte and graduated from Ordrup Gymnasium in 1970. He completed a bachelor's degree from Copenhagen Business School in 1973 but never completed his MBA.

== Career ==
During his career Fritz Schur has been chairman of several companies including Ørsted, Uhrenholdt Holding, Fritz Schur Gruppen, Relation-Lab, SAS Group and PostNord.

== Board memberships ==
Schur is a board member of the Alliance of Democracies.

== Personal life ==
Schur lives on the Christiansholm estate in Klampenborg north of Copenhagen.

== Awards ==
On 24 April 2009, Fritz Schur became a Commander of the Order of the Dannebrog. He was granted the honorary Chamberlain title on 11 June 2010. He has also been awarded the Order of the Lion of Finland, the Order of José de Marcoleta and Order of the Polar Star. In 2009, Schur was named Chairman of the Teat in Denmark by PricewaterhouseCoopers.
