= Bernstorffstøtten =

Monument in Gentofte Municipality, Denmark

Coordinates: 55°44′08″N 12°32′34″E

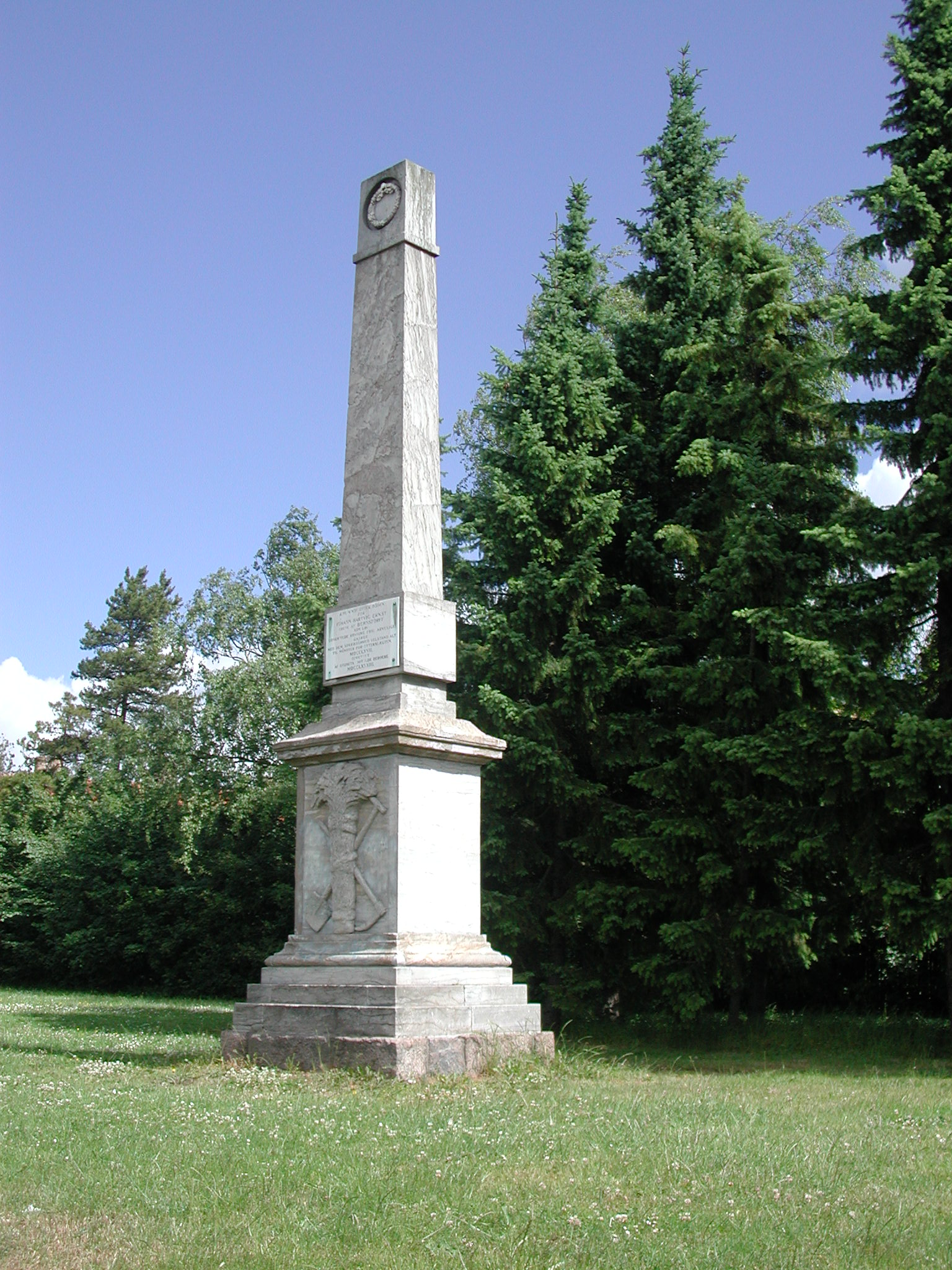
Bernstorffstøtten

The Bernstorff Memorial (Danish: Bernstorffstøtten) is a memorial to Count Johann Hartwig Ernst von Bernstorff located at Lyngbyvej, just south of Kildegårds Plads, Gentofte Municipality, in Copenhagen, Denmark. It was erected by local farmers to a design by Johannes Wiedewelt to commemorate the agricultural reforms that Bernstorff introduced on his estate, Bernstorff Palace.

== History ==
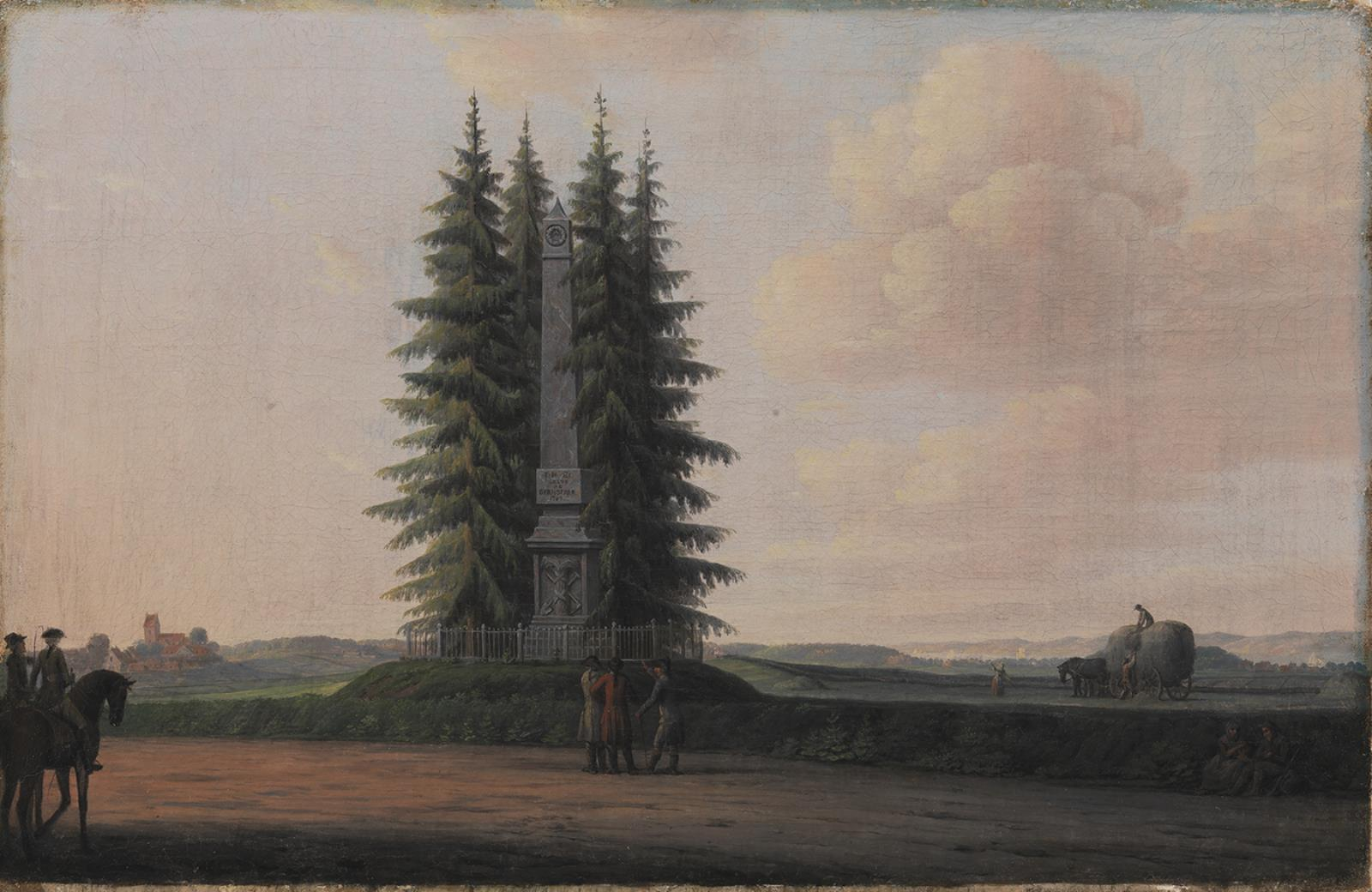
The memorial painted by Erik Pauelsen in 1789

The memorial was inaugurated on a hilltop just south of Gentofte on 28 August 1783. The 100 years anniversary for the agricultural reforms at Bernstorff Palace was celebrated on 20 June 1866. It was listed in 1918.

== Description ==
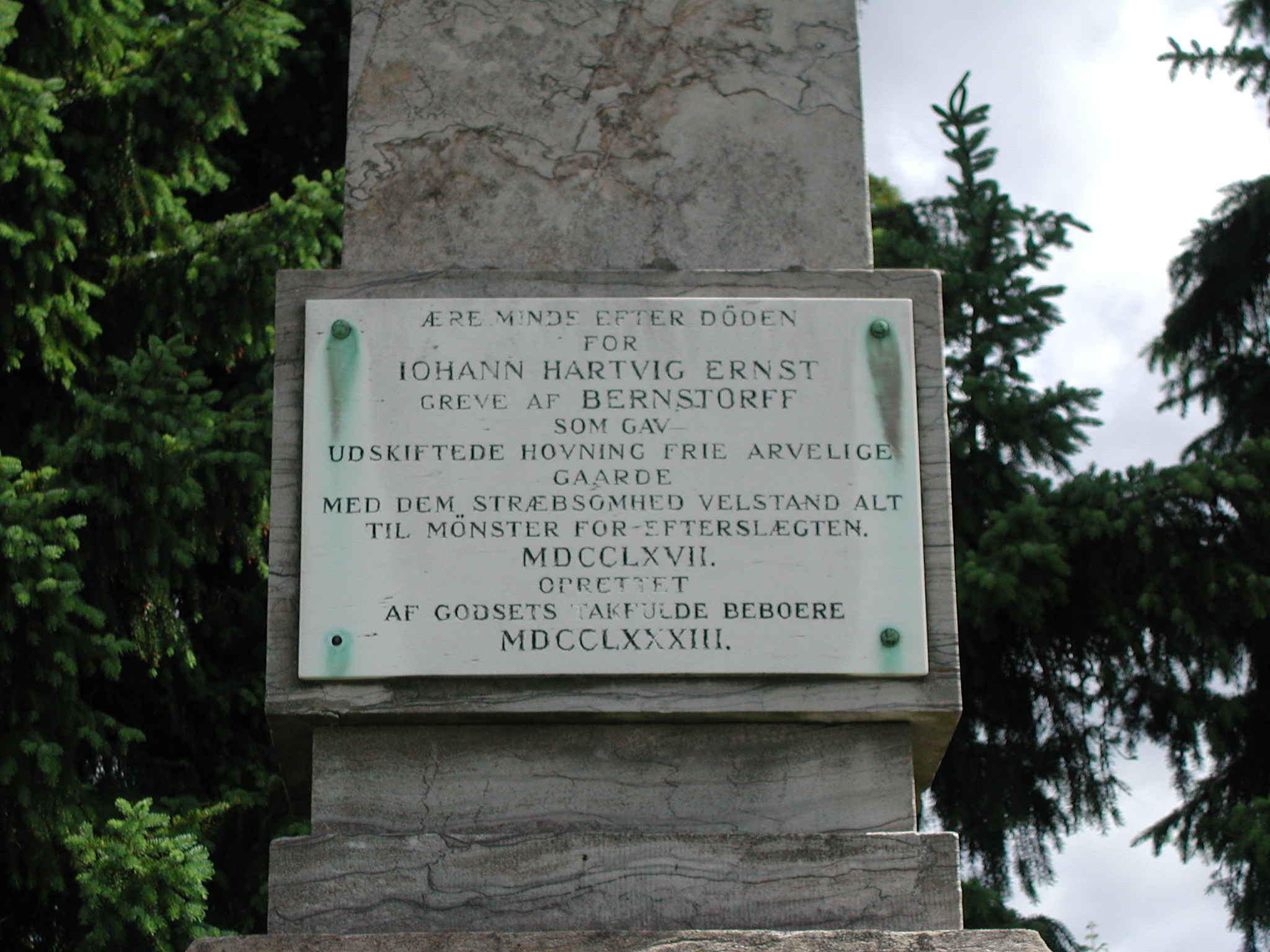
The inscription

The Neoclassical memorial is executed in Norwegian marble and stands on a granite plinth. It features reliefs representing the harvest and a plaque inscription:

Æreminde efter Døden / for / Johan Hartvig Ernst / Greve af Bernstorff / som gav / udskiftede :::hovningsfrie arvelige /Gaarde / med dem Stræbsomhed Velstand alt / til Mønster for Efterslægten / :::MDCCLXVII / oprettet / af Godsets takfulde Beboere MDCCLXXXIII.

== Publication ==
- Møller, N: Kort Beskrivelse over Forfatningen paa Godset Bernstorff for og efter Fælledskabets Ophævelse og Eiendoms Meddelelse, med Forklaring over den af Bønderne oprettede Obelisk, Copenhagen1783.

== See also ==
- Liberty Column, Copenhagen
