= Bernstorff Palace =

Coordinates: 55.7584°N 12.5523°E

- Bernstorff Slot
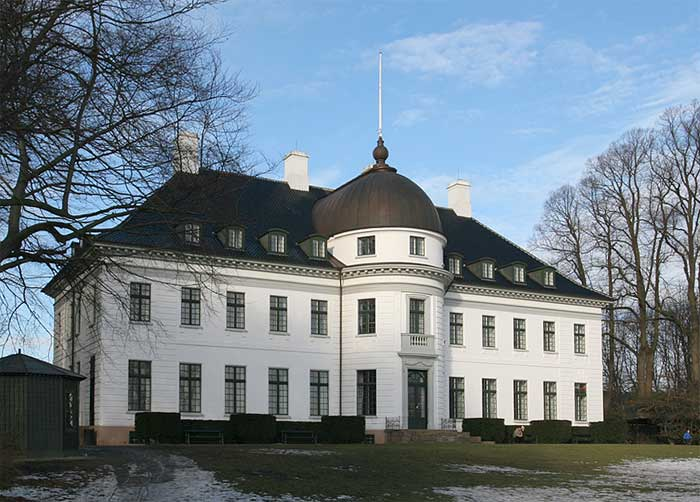
- Bernstorff Palace
- Interactive map of the Bernstorff Palace area

General information
- Type: Country house/royal residence
- Architectural style: Neo-Classicism
- Location: Gentofte, Denmark
- Construction started: 1759
- Completed: 1765
- Client: Count Johann Hartwig Ernst von Bernstorff

Design and construction
- Architect: Nicolas-Henri Jardin

Bernstorff Palace (Danish: Bernstorff Slot) in Gentofte, Copenhagen, Denmark, was built in the middle of the 18th century for Foreign Minister Count Johann Hartwig Ernst von Bernstorff. It remained in the possession of the Bernstorff family until 1812. In 1842, it was bought by Christian VIII. For many years, it was used as a summer residence by Christian IX until his death in 1906.

Since then and until recently, it was used by the Danish Emergency Management Agency as an academy for non-commissioned officers, but it has now opened as a hotel and conference centre.

== History ==
=== Bernstorff family ===
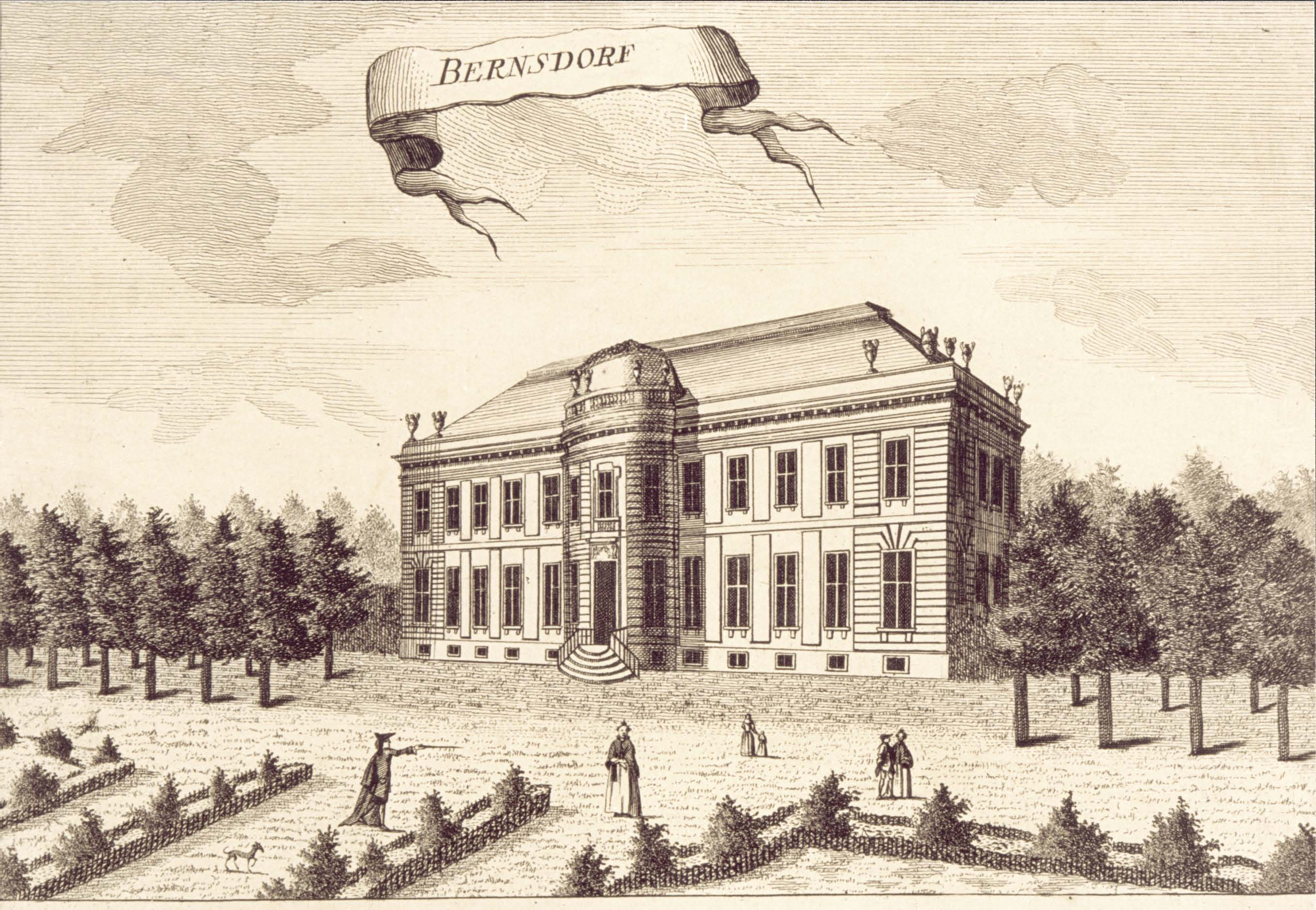
Bernstorff Palace in the 1760s.

The palace was designed by the French architect Nicolas-Henri Jardin, who had been brought to Denmark to complete Frederick's Church in Copenhagen after the death of Nicolai Eigtved in 1754. It is one of the earliest examples of Neoclassical architecture in Denmark. The elaborately decorated two-storeyed building was completed in May 1765 at considerable cost. At the time, it had four small decorative garrets, attics with decorative vases and a wide balcony on the roof ridge itself. On the garden side, there is a dome-covered projection rising the full height of the building.

The palace's many rooms were modest in size and intended primarily for domestic use rather than for display. Most are panelled with parquet floors, large mirrors and decorated ceilings. The four rooms on the south side have overdoors decorated by Johan Edvard Mandelberg.

Bernstorff left Denmark in 1770, after being dismissed by the regent, Johann Friedrich Struensee.

The estate remained in his family's hands until 1812.

=== Changing owners, 1812–1842 ===
In 1812, Bernstorff Palace was sold for 225,000 rigsdaler to Ole Christian Borch. The next year, he sold it for 280,000 rigsdaler to royal president, later gehejmestats- og justitsminister Frederik Julius Kaas.

In 1817, Kaas sold Bernstorff Palace to Christopher MacEvoy Jr., a wealthy plantation owner from the Danish West Indies, who shortly thereafter also bought the Dehn Mansion in Copenhagen. He had the park redesigned in the English garden style. At the time of his death in 1838, Bernstorff Palace had fallen into neglect. Most of the land remained in the hands of the Bernstorff family until 1839 when it was sold to krigsassessor Peter Hilarius Ferdinand Kalko. That same year, at auction, he also purchased Bernstorff Palace for 25,850 rigsdaler. Kalko's intention was to demolish the main building but this plan was never realized.

=== Royal ownership, 1842–1939 ===
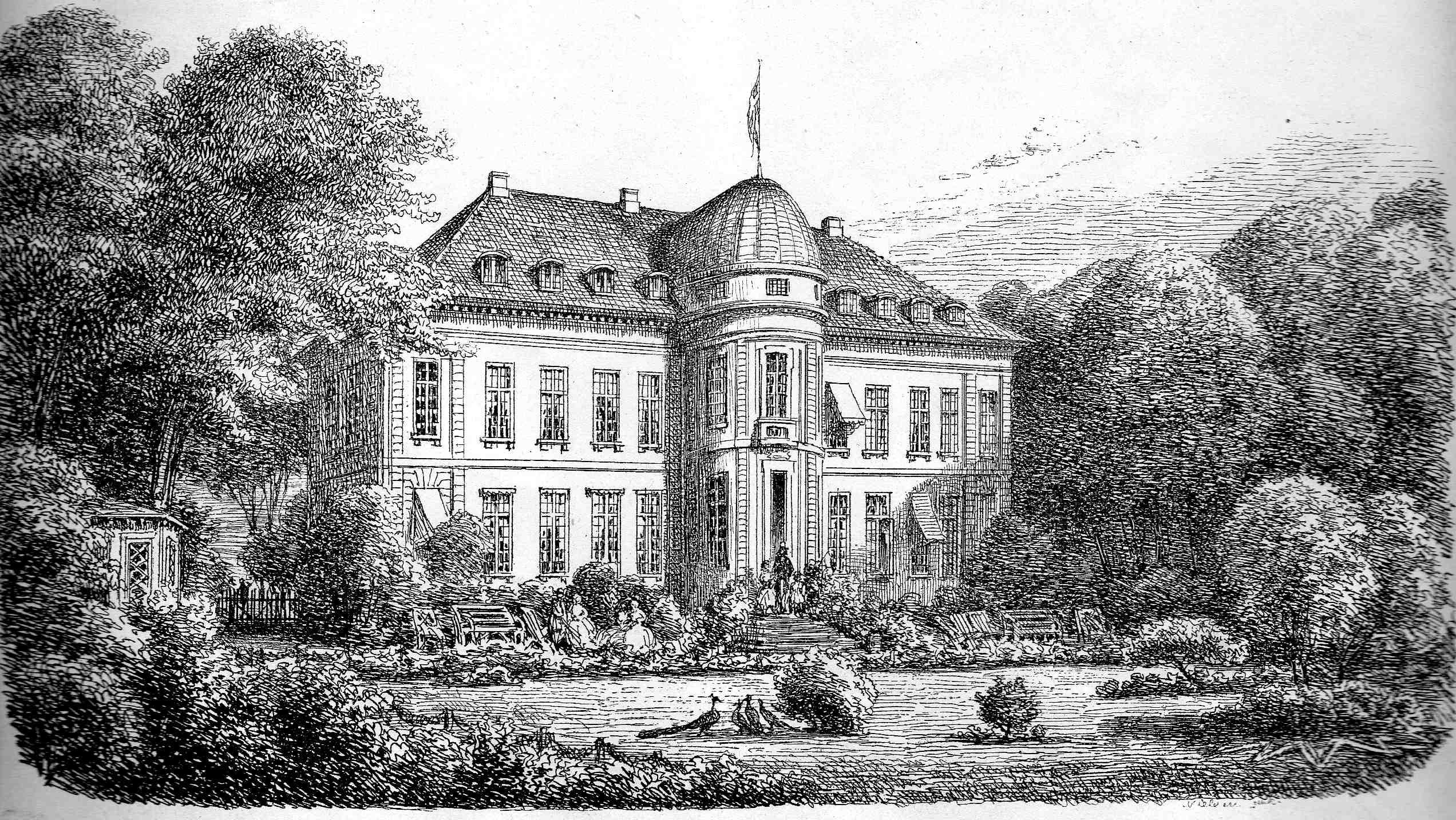
Ferdinand Richardt:Bernstorff Palace in 1867

The Bernstorff Palace was about to be demolished in 1842 when Christian VIII bought it and charged Jørgen Hansen Koch with its comprehensive renovation. A mezzanine was added and the layout of the first-floor rooms was changed.

Fitting Jardin's decorative style, Norwegian marble fireplaces are to be found in three of the larger rooms. A sign above the entrance reads: "Honesto inter labores otio sacrum" or "Reserved for honest rest between periods of work."

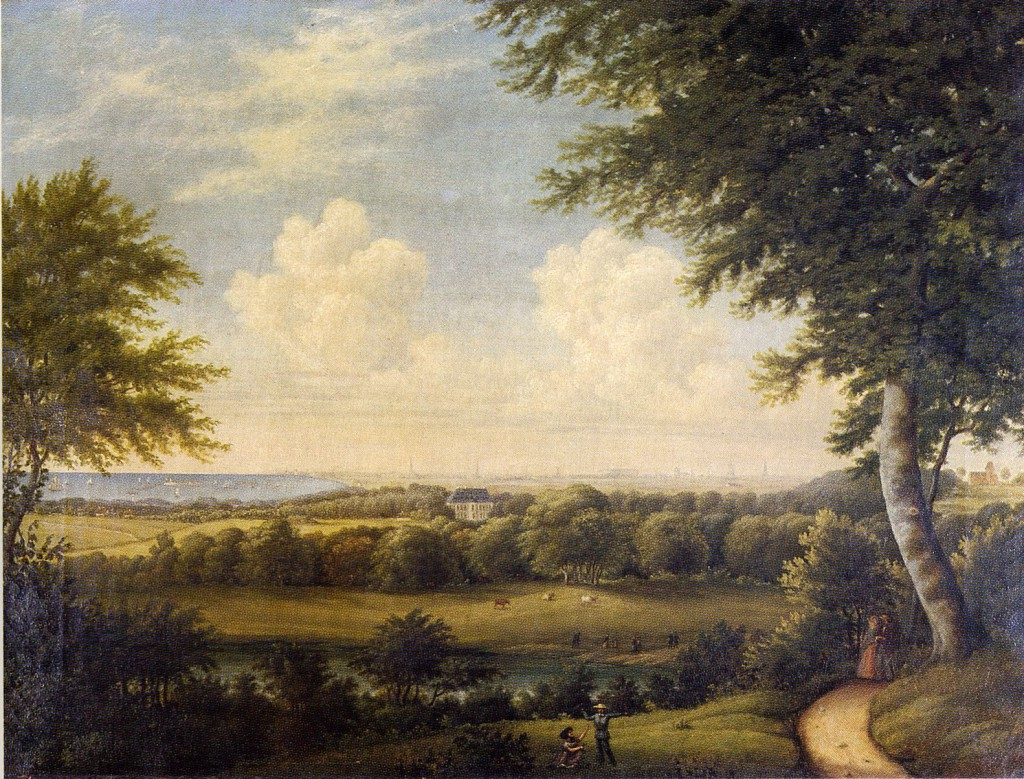
Bernstorff Palace seen from Fortunen in 1860

In 1854, Bernstorff Palace was placed at the disposal of Crown Prince Christian, later King Christian IX, who adopted it as his preferred summer residence. Indeed, it was to become a popular retreat for the royal couple and their extended family during the king's long reign. Visitors included Tsar Alexander III of Russia and Edward VII of the United Kingdom. In 1888, after the Nordic Exhibition, Queen Louise bought the timbered Swedish pavilion and had it fitted out as guest quarters.

On Christian IX's death in 1906, Prince Valdemar of Denmark inherited the palace, continuing to use it as a summer residence until his death in 1939. Princess Margaret of Denmark, Prince Valdemar's youngest child, was born at Bernstorff Palace.

=== Recent history ===
Afterwards, it was used by the Danish Emergency Management Agency as an academy for non-commissioned officers. On 1 May 2009, after an agreement with Gitte Jensen and Kirsten Nielsen, Bernstorff Palace opened as a hotel and conference centre.

== The palace gardens ==
The palace's extensive gardens were laid out in the Romantic landscape style which had just been introduced to Denmark in the 1760s. In addition to the lawns and woods, they include a rose garden, an orchard and a tea house. It is believed that Jardin, who designed the palace, was also responsible for the design of the gardens, especially as his plans refer to the emergence of landscape gardens as a new trend in Denmark.

The Bernstorffs, who took great interest in the gardens, planted apricots, peaches, grapes, rare apple and pear trees, cherries and plums in their kitchen garden, together with rare varieties of cucumbers, artichokes, lettuces and melons from France and the Netherlands. They also acquired a host of rare trees and bushes for the gardens including chestnuts, acacias, holly, tulip trees, plane trees, medlars, azaleas, barberries, quinces and lilacs, many of them completely new to Denmark at the time.

Most of these exotic varieties had withered away by the time Christian IX bought the estate in 1854. He charged Rudolph Rothe, the royal garden inspector, to replace them with Danish oak and beech which can still be seen today.

The beautiful Swedish Villa in the gardens was built in 1888 in the classic Swedish timbered style for the Nordic Exhibition. Run by the Swedish Villa Foundation, it is used for art exhibitions, concerts and as a café.

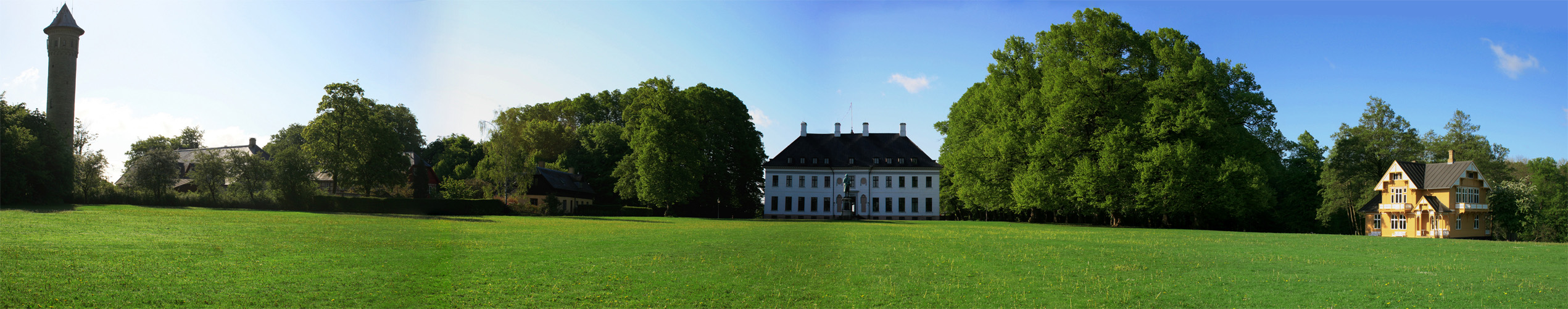
The Bernstorff Palace Gardens

== See also ==
- Bernstorffstøtten
