= Christiansholm, Gentofte Municipality =

Historic house in Klampenborg, Denmark

Christiansholm
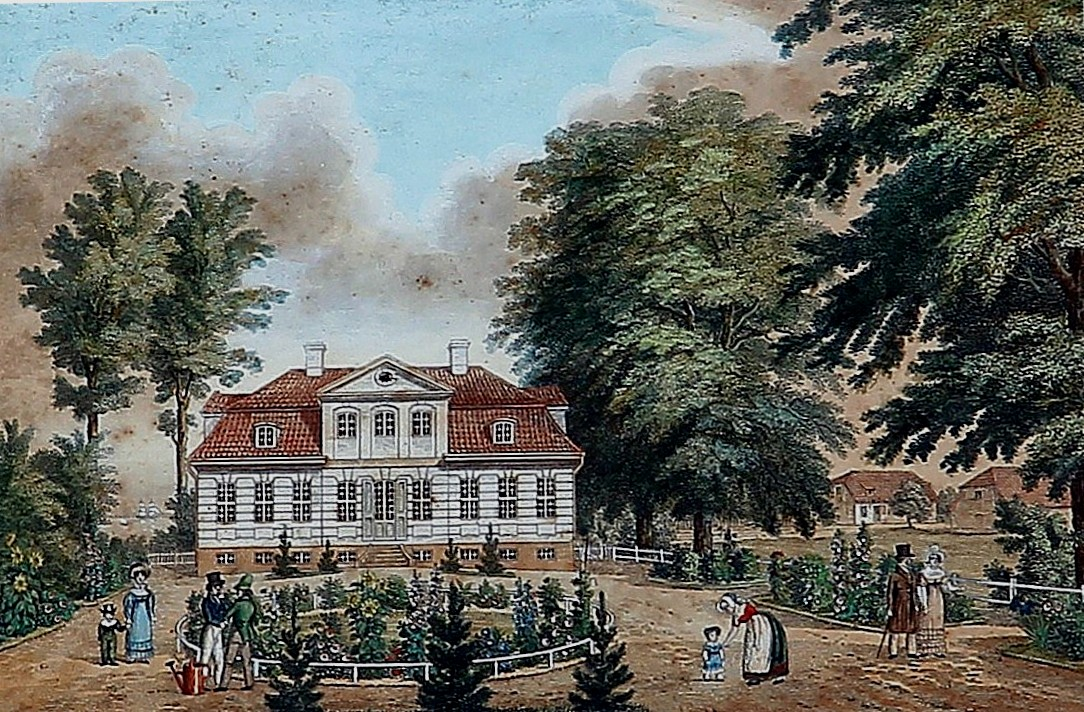
- Christiansholm in c. 1850
- Interactive map of the Christiansholm area

General information
- Architectural style: Johan Christian Conradi
- Location: Klampenborg, Gentofte Municipality, Copenhagen, Denmark
- Coordinates: 55°46′22.12″N 12°35′15.45″E
- Current tenants: Fritz Schur

Christiansholm is a historic house in Klampenborg, Gentofte Municipality, some 10 km north of central Copenhagen, Denmark. It was built by the merchant Just Fabritius and is now owned by the businessman Fritz Schur.

== History ==
=== Early history ===
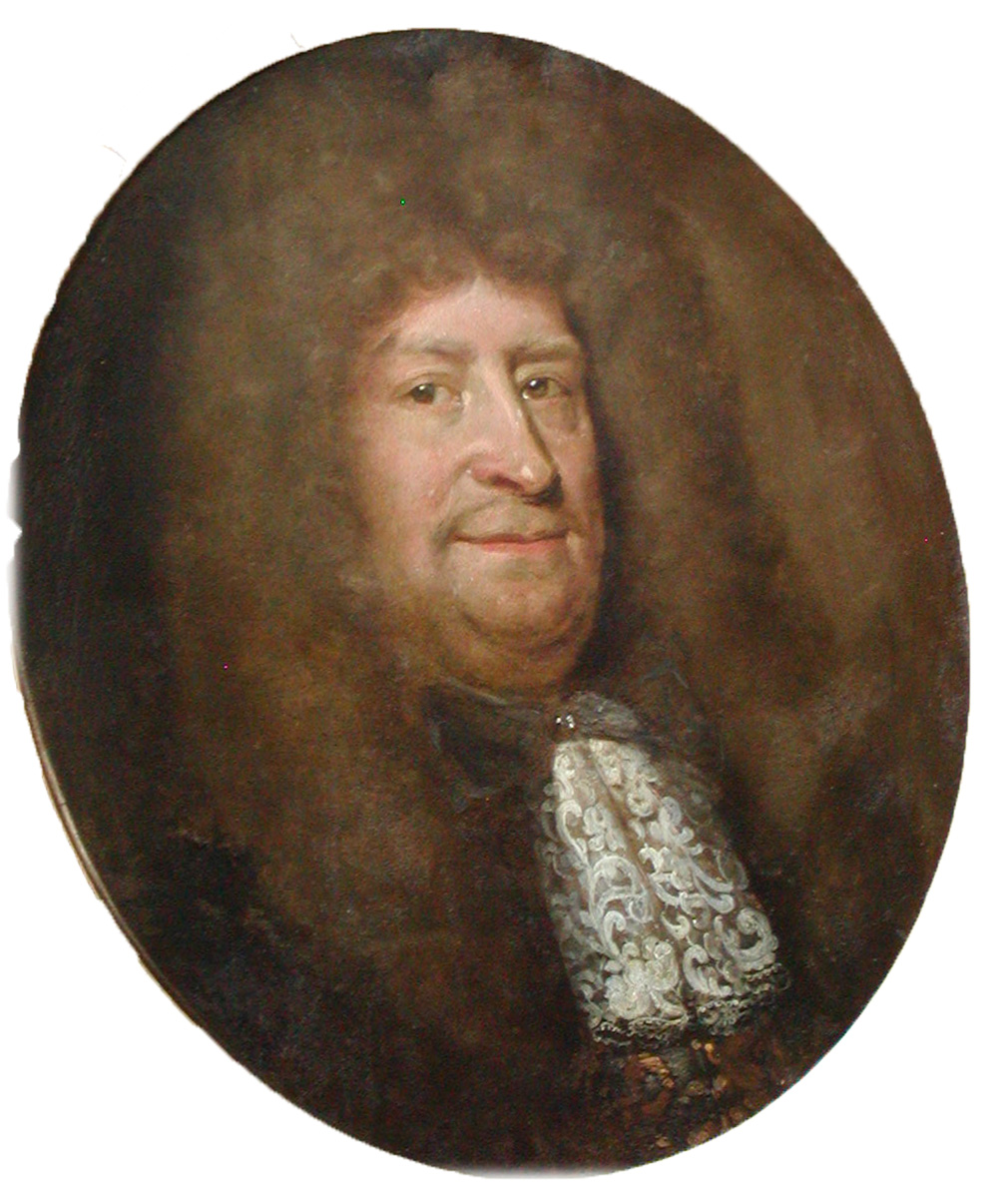
Vitus Bering

The Klampenborg area was in 1666 granted to Historiographer Royal Vitus Bering for life by Christian V. He constructed a modest country house at the site and gave it the name Christians Holm in 1670. It has been described as the earliest country house in Denmark. The estate returned to the crown when Bering died in 1675.

=== The new house ===
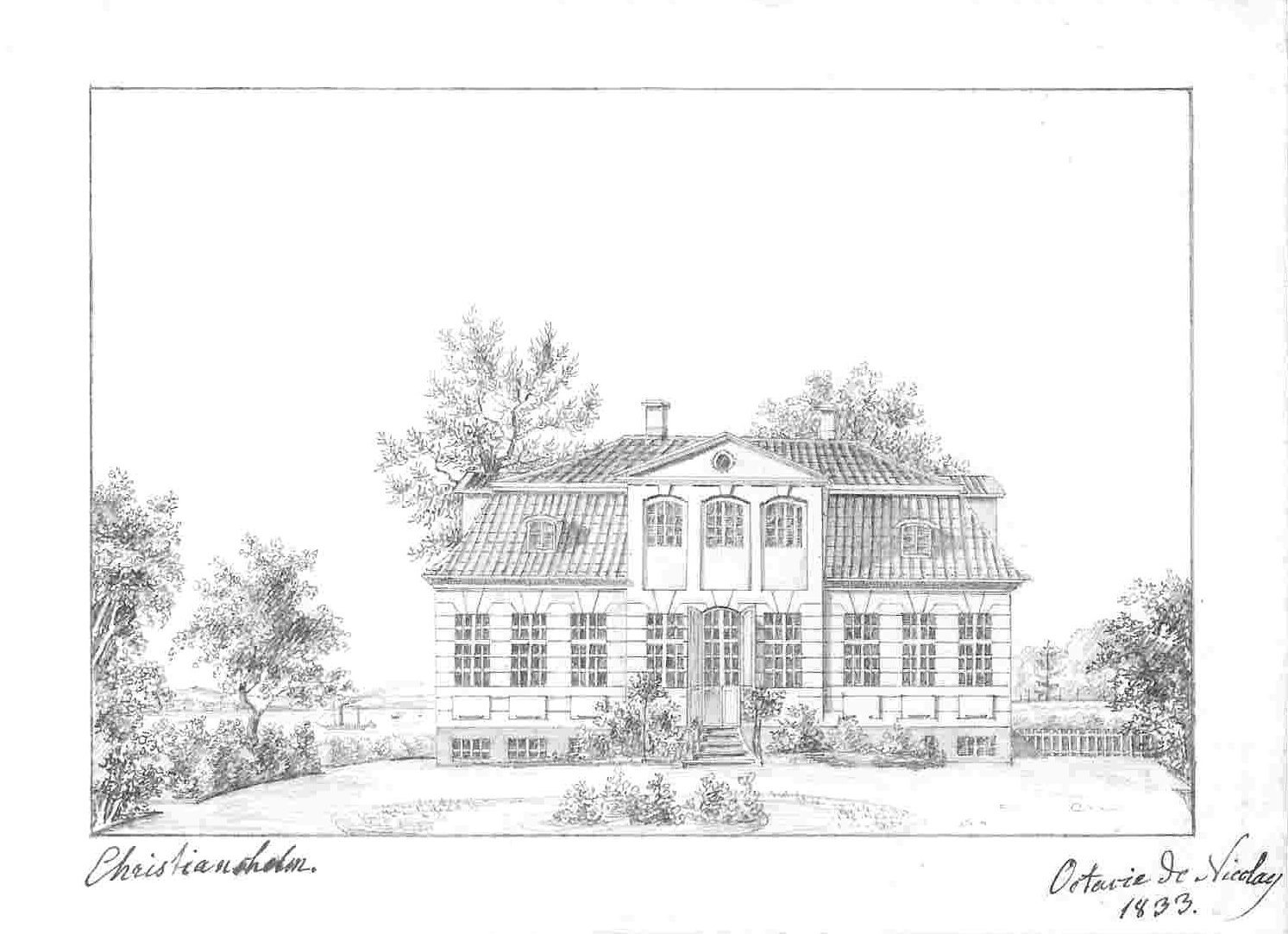
Christiansholm in c. 1830

In 1746, Christiansholm was acquired by the merchant Just Fabritius. He constructed a new house on the land. It is believed that the architect was Johan Christian Conradi, who also worked on Fabritius' townhouse on the street Pustervig in Copenhagen. Fabritius owned Christiansholm until 1763.

Christopher MacEvoy Sr., a wealthy planter and merchant from St. Croix in the Danish West Indies, purchased Christiansholm in c. 1777. In 1783, he sold Christiansholm to Ernst Heinrich von Schimmelmann. Schimmelmann allowed Adam Oehlenschläger to use it as a summer retreat from about 1810.

In 1863, the estate was acquired by count Christian Danneskiold-Samsøe. He was appointed to administrative leader of the Royal Danish Theatre and acquired Nordfeld on the island of Møn in 1894.

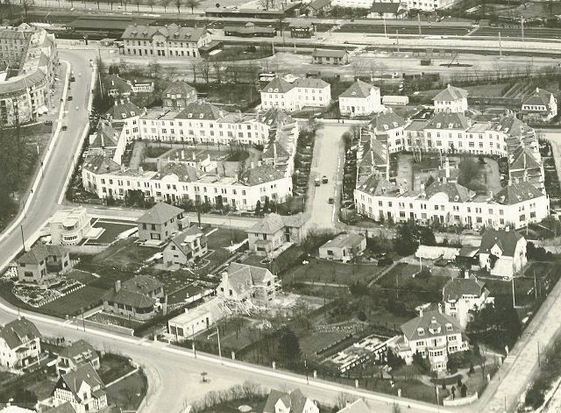
The English Terraces viewed from the air in the 1930s

In 1900, Christiansholm was purchased by count Gustav Adolph Clauson-Kaas and baron Lerche through the company A/S Christiansholm. In 1901–1903, they redeveloped most of the estate with the assistance of architect Tasmus Jensen. The development was, deceptively, marketed as Christiansholms Engelske Villakvarter ("Christiansholm's English Villa Quarter"), although the inspiration was in fact English terraced housing. The original plans comprised nine closed blocks but only two were built. The buildings are the earliest example of terraced housing in Gentofte Municipality.

The main building was sold to count Carl Moltke in 1914. A marshy area portion of the remaining land was acquired by Gentofte Municipality in 1920 and converted into a public parkland in 1929.

The house was put through a major restoration in 1988–1990 undertaken by the architect Ulrich Schirnig from HUS arkitekter.

== Today ==
The property is today owned by the businessman Fritz Schur. Schur has stated that he intends to turn the house into a retreat for Nordic artists after his death.
