= Whim, U.S. Virgin Islands =

Whim, United States Virgin Islands
- Village
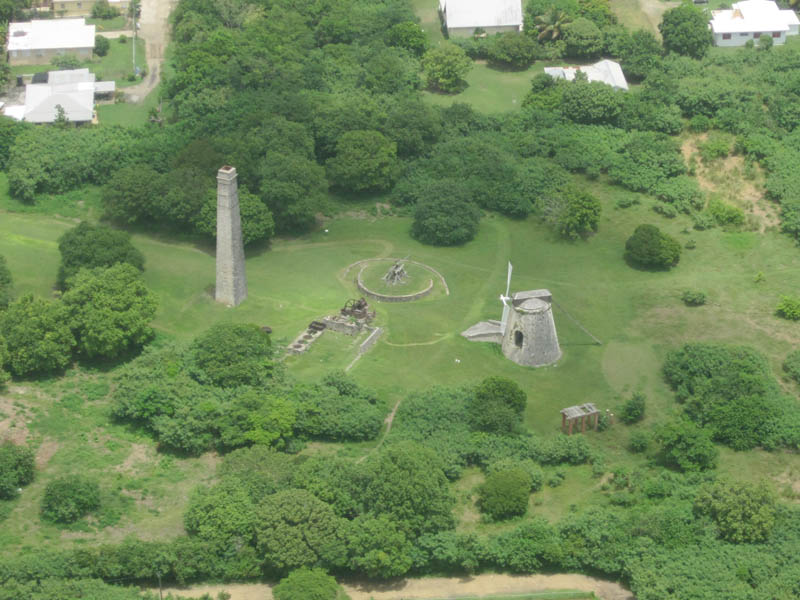
- Old windmill at Whim Plantation
- Interactive map of Whim, United States Virgin Islands
- Country: United States Virgin Islands
- Island: Saint Croix
- Time zone: UTC-4 (AST)
- Whim
- U.S. National Register of Historic Places
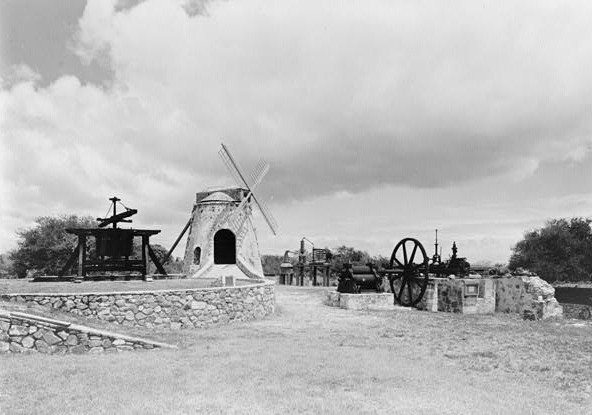

- Location within Saint Croix, U.S. Virgin Islands Location within the U.S. Virgin Islands
- Location: 1.7 miles (2.7 km) southeast of Frederiksted on Centerline Road, Saint Croix, U.S. Virgin Islands
- Coordinates: 17°42′8″N 64°51′49″W
- Area: 10 acres (4.0 ha)
- Built: 1794
- Architect: Mac Evoy, Christopher, Jr.
- Architectural style: Danish neo-classicism
- NRHP reference No.: 76001858
- Added to NRHP: July 30, 1976

Whim is a settlement on the island of Saint Croix in the United States Virgin Islands. It is located about 1.7 miles (2.7 km) southeast of Frederiksted on Centerline Road on Saint Croix, U.S. Virgin Islands. It was listed on the National Register of Historic Places in 1976. The listing included three contributing buildings, one contributing site, and two contributing structures, on 10 acres (4.0 ha).

The estate's Great House was built in about 1794 by Christopher Mac Evoy, Jr., is about "90 by 35 feet (27 m × 11 m) in plan, and is unusual for its "curved ends and complex exterior articulation". The site has steam engines and other features besides original buildings.

It includes Danish neo-classicism architecture.

== History ==
The town is located at the site of Estate Whim, a large sugarcane plantation, sugar mill, and rum distillery during the colonial Danish West Indies era. The Whin estate was in the 18th century owned first by Christopher MacEvoy Sr. and later by his son Christopher MacEvoy Jr. The stone ruins are on the National Register of Historic Places.

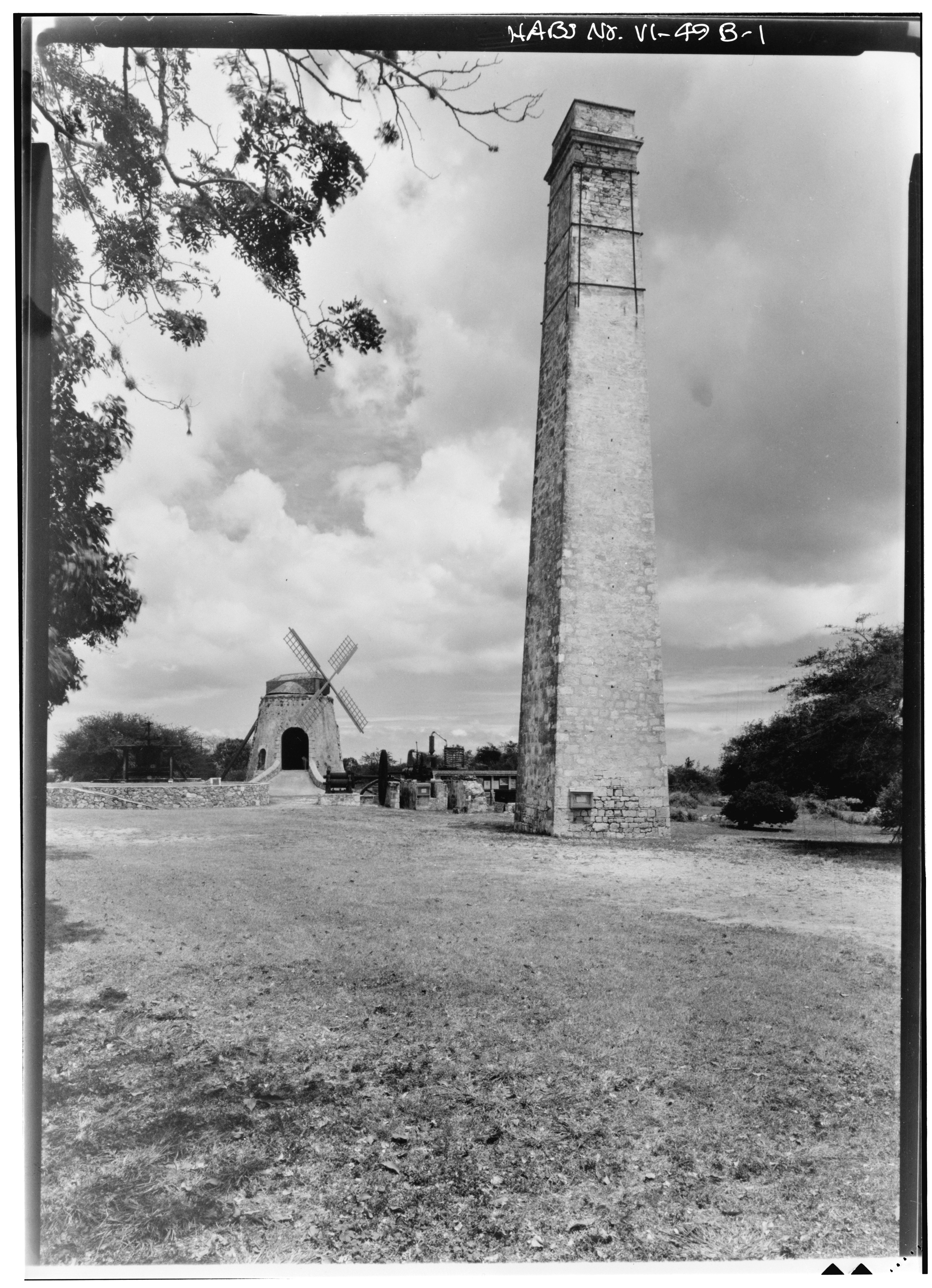
Windmill and chimney of Estate Whim.

== See also ==
- Sugar production in the Danish West Indies
- Sugar plantations in the Caribbean
- National Register of Historic Places listings in the United States Virgin Islands
