= 2008 Taiwanese United Nations membership referendum =

Nationwide referendum proposal 5
- 22 March 2008
- In 1971, the People's Republic of China joined the United Nations, replacing the Republic of China and causing Taiwan to become an orphan in the world. To strongly express the will of the people of Taiwan to enhance Taiwan's international status and participation in international affairs. Do you agree that the government should apply for UN membership under the name "Taiwan"?
- Outcome: Proposition failed due to low turnout

Results
| Choice | Votes | % |
|---|---|---|
| Yes | 5,529,230 | 94.01% |
| No | 352,359 | 5.99% |
| Valid votes | 5,881,589 | 94.84% |
| Invalid or blank votes | 320,088 | 5.16% |
| Total votes | 6,201,677 | 100.00% |
| Registered voters/turnout | 17,313,854 | 35.82% |

Nationwide referendum proposal 6
- 22 March 2008
- Do you agree that our nation should apply to return to the United Nations and join other international organizations based on pragmatic, flexible strategies with respect to the name [under which we apply to and participate in them]? That is: Do you approve of applying to return to the United Nations and to join other international organizations under the name "Republic of China", or "Taiwan", or other name that is conducive to success and preserves our nation's dignity?
- Outcome: Proposition failed due to low turnout

Results
| Choice | Votes | % |
|---|---|---|
| Yes | 4,962,309 | 87.27% |
| No | 724,060 | 12.73% |
| Valid votes | 5,686,369 | 91.91% |
| Invalid or blank votes | 500,749 | 8.09% |
| Total votes | 6,187,118 | 100.00% |
| Registered voters/turnout | 17,313,854 | 35.74% |

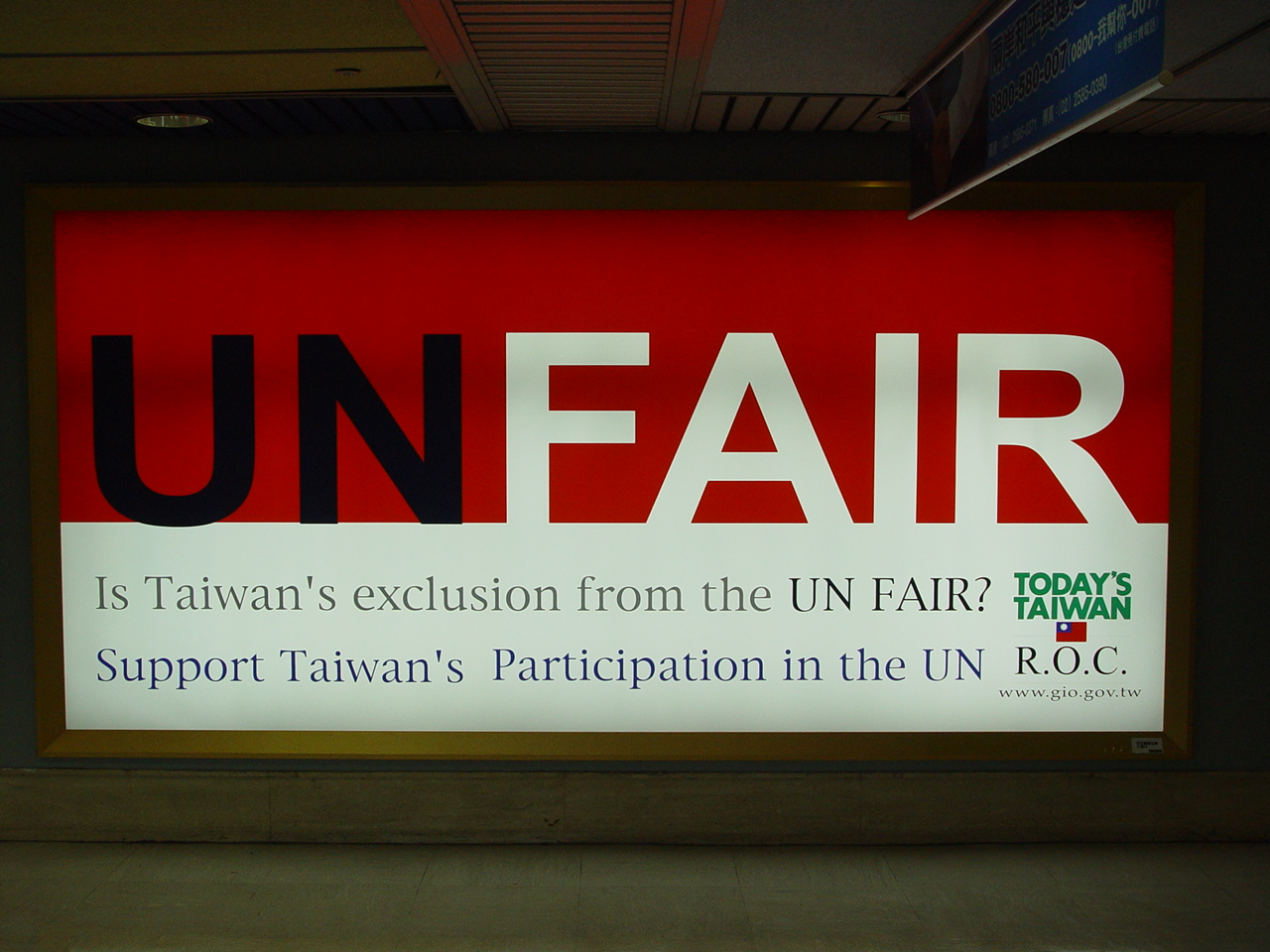
Billboard supporting Taiwan joining the UN in Taiwan Taoyuan International Airport

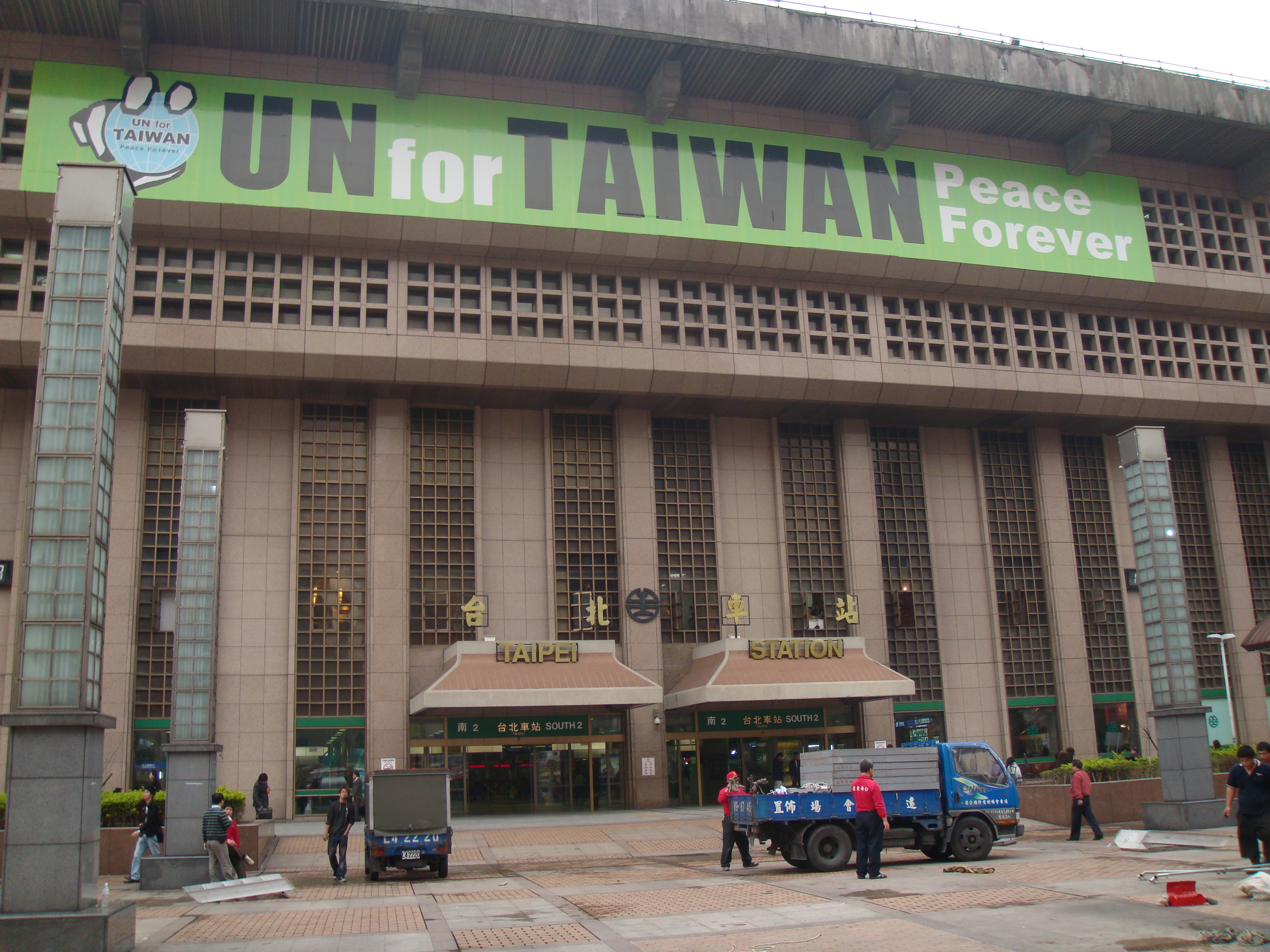
Under Chen Shui-bian, banners supporting Taiwan joining the UN were common in government buildings, such as Taipei Main Station.

Two referendums on submitting a United Nations membership applications were held in Taiwan on 22 March 2008, the same day as the presidential elections.

Taiwan, officially known as the Republic of China, had been a founding member of the United Nations (UN) until 1971, when the People's Republic of China took the Chinese seat. Since then, the country has sought to rejoin the organization.

The first referendum question, supported by the Democratic Progressive Party (DPP) of President Chen Shui-bian, asked whether voters agree that the government should seek United Nations membership under the name "Taiwan". The second referendum question, supported by the Kuomintang (KMT), which on the same day won the presidential election, asked whether voters supported "our nation" seeking to "return" to the United Nations and join other international organisations under "flexible and practical strategies", including joining as "Republic of China", "Taiwan", or any other name that aids success and national dignity.

Although large majorities voted in favour of both proposals, the referendums were invalidated as voter turnout was just 36%, well below the 50% required. In contrast, the simultaneous presidential elections had a turnout of 76%.

== Questions ==
=== Proposal 5 ===
Proposal 5 was initiated by Yu Shyi-kun, former Premier and chairman of the Democratic Progressive Party. The topic was "Application to become a new member of the United Nations under the name "Taiwan""

In 1971, the People's Republic of China joined the United Nations, replacing the Republic of China and causing Taiwan to become an orphan in the world. To strongly express the will of the people of Taiwan to enhance Taiwan's international status and participation in international affairs,

Do you agree that the government should apply for UN membership under the name "Taiwan"?

(Chinese text: 1971年中華人民共和國進入聯合國，取代中華民國，台灣成為國際孤兒。為強烈表達台灣人民的意志，提升台灣的國際地位及參與，您是否同意政府以「台灣」名義加入聯合國？)
(Pinyin: 1971 nián Zhōnghuá Rénmín Gònghéguó jìnrù Liánhéguó, qǔdài Zhōnghuá Mínguó, Táiwān chéngwéi guójì gū'ér. Wèi qiángliè biǎodá Táiwān rénmín de yìzhì, tíshēng Táiwān de guójì dìwèi jí cānyù, nín shìfǒu tóngyì zhèngfǔ yǐ "Táiwān" míngyì jiārù Liánhéguó?)

=== Proposal 6 ===
Proposal 6 was first initiated by Vincent Siew, former Premier and Vice President.

Do you agree that our nation should apply to return to the United Nations and join other international organizations based on pragmatic, flexible strategies with respect to the name [under which we apply to and participate in them]? That is:

Do you approve of applying to return to the United Nations and to join other international organizations under the name "Republic of China", or "Taiwan", or other name that is conducive to success and preserves our nation's dignity?

(Chinese text: 您是否同意我國申請重返聯合國及加入其它組織，名稱採務實、有彈性的策略，亦即贊成以中華民國名義、或以台灣名義、或以其他有助於成功並兼顧尊嚴的名稱，申請重返聯合國及加入其他國際組織？)
(Pinyin: Nín shìfǒu tóngyì wǒguó shēnqǐng chóng fǎn Liánhéguó jí jiārù qítā zǔzhī, míngchēng cǎi wùshí, yǒu tánxìng de cèlüè, yì jí zànchéng yǐ Zhōnghuá Mínguó míngyì, huò yǐ Táiwān míngyì, huò yǐ qítā yǒu zhù yú chénggōng bìng jiāngù zūnyán de míngchēng, shēnqǐng chóng fǎn Liánhéguó jí jiārù qítā guójì zǔzhī?)

== Campaign ==
Although the proposals referendums were both supported by one of the two major parties in Taiwan, they were both formally voter-initiated, rather than government-sponsored. While the KMT initiated one of the two referendums, it encouraged its voters to least boycott the DPP-initiated referendum, and expressed understanding if supporters chose to boycott both referendums. Although KMT officials such as presidential candidate Ma Ying-jeou and chairman Wu Po-hsiung received ballot papers for the KMT-sponsored referendum, their family and other KMT officials, such as chairman emeritus Lien Chan refused to take ballot papers for either referendum. Former president Lee Teng-hui did not take either ballot paper, which he said was because he "forgot" to bring the documentation, although reporters at the scene pointed out to him that he did not need documentation to vote. DPP officials, including president Chen Shui-bian, called on voters to vote in both referendums.

== Opinion polls ==
=== Applying for United Nations membership under the name of "Taiwan" ===
| Pollster | Date | For | Against |
|---|---|---|---|
| TVBS | 17 July 2007 | 46 | 29 |
| United Daily News | 14 September 2007 | 43 | 31 |
| TVBS | 19 September 2007 | 34 | 51 |
| TVBS | 18 January 2008 | 33 | 52 |

=== Flexible participation in international organizations ===
| Pollster | Date | For | Against |
|---|---|---|---|
| TVBS | 19 September 2007 | 18 | 67 |
| TVBS | 18 January 2008 | 17 | 68 |

== Results ==
| Question | For | | Against | | Invalid/ blank | Total | Registered voters | Turnout | Outcome |
| Question | Votes | % | Votes | % | Invalid/ blank | Total | Registered voters | Turnout | Outcome |
|---|---|---|---|---|---|---|---|---|---|
| Proposal 5 | 5,529,230 | 94.01 | 352,359 | 5.99 | 320,088 | 6,201,677 | 17,313,854 | 35.82 | Quorum not reached |
| Proposal 6 | 4,962,309 | 87.27 | 724,060 | 12.73 | 500,749 | 6,187,118 | 17,313,854 | 35.74 | Quorum not reached |
Source: CEC

== Reactions ==
United States: The United States Department of State has stated that it opposed a referendum on membership in the United Nations. While it strongly supports Taiwan's democratic development and is not opposed to referendums in principle, it is against "any initiative that appears designed to change Taiwan's status unilaterally." In September 2007, Zogby International conducted an opinion poll on the support of this referendum, the result shows over 61% of Americans believe that the US government should support the referendum.

Japan: A Japanese company also conducted a poll on the same issue; the result shows over 74% Japanese support Taiwan's entry into the UN, and over 81% support the referendum. However, this referendum has not become a major political issue in either the United States or Japan.

China: China made relatively few comments on the issue. It argued that the referendum would "endanger peace and stability across the Strait and the Asia-Pacific region.", and was "pinning hope on the Taiwan people" and will keep promoting cross-Strait exchanges to strengthen opposition to secessionist forces. It had stated that it appreciated the US opposition to the referendum. After the referendums were defeated due to low voter turnout, the Taiwan Affairs Office of the State Council of the People's Republic of China commented that the results showed the lack of popular support for independence in Taiwan. The Bureau also expressed optimism for the two governments to work together to maintain cross-strait peace and aid development in future.

President Chen Shui-bian accused both the United States and the European Union of caving into Chinese pressure over the referendum.
