= Christopher MacEvoy Jr. =

Danish merchant and planter (1760–1838)

Christopher MacEvoy Jr. (1760 – 1838) was a Danish merchant, landowner and planter. He was born in the Danish West Indies, where MacEvoy owned the Whim plantation, now a museum, on St. Croix. He later moved to Copenhagen where he established a trading house as well as a sugar refinery at Gammel Strand. He owned Bernstorff Palace in Charlottenlund from 1817 and the Dehn Mansion in Copenhagen from 1818.

== Biography ==
MacEvoy was born in 1760 on Saint Croix in the Danish West Indies, the son of Christopher MacEvoy Sr. and Mary Markoe. He inherited the Whim plantation at Frederiksted (now a museum) on St. Croix and lived in England for a few years before settling in Copenhagen. He owned a property at Gammel Strand 29 (then Ved Stranden 4) where he also operated a sugar refinery in the courtyard. The buildings were destroyed in the Copenhagen Fire of 1795 but subsequently rebuilt. He purchased Bernstorff Palace in Charlottenlund north of Copenhagen in 1817. He died on the estate in 1839.
