= Jonas Parello-Plesner =

Danish foreign policy analyst (born 1973)

- Occupation: Security analyst
- Employer: Alliance of Democracies

Jonas Parello-Plesner (born 21 November 1973) is a Danish security policy analyst currently serving as director of the Alliance of Democracies. He is also a visiting fellow at the German Marshall Fund and a non-resident senior fellow at Hudson Institute.

== Career ==
Parello-Plesner is a former diplomat for Denmark specializing on China, the US and Europe.

== Publications ==
He co-authored China's Strong Arm: Protecting Citizens and Assets Abroad, which describes how China's strategic thinking is affected by having Chinese workers and companies on the front lines in fragile states with concrete studies of Chinese evacuations in Libya in 2011, Sudan in 2013 and Yemen in 2015.

His 2025 book The Battle for Taiwan was given a largely positive review by the Taipei Times, and was reviewed by the Foreign Affairs magazine.
