= Alliance of Democracies =

Non-profit organization

Alliance of Democracies Foundation
- Abbreviation: AoD
- Formation: 2017
- Registration no.: 39209349
- Headquarters: Copenhagen, Denmark
- Founder: Anders Fogh Rasmussen (founder);
- Key people: Jonas Parello-Plesner (executive director)
- Website: www.allianceofdemocracies.org

The Alliance of Democracies Foundation (AoD) is a non-profit organisation dedicated to the advancement of democracy and free markets across the globe. It was established in December 2017 by former NATO Secretary General and former Danish Prime Minister Anders Fogh Rasmussen together with businessman Fritz Schur and lawyer Klaus Søgaard.

According to its founder, Anders Fogh Rasmussen, the United States is retreating from the world stage, leaving behind a vacuum that is filled by autocrats like Vladimir Putin, Kim Jong-un, and Bashar al-Assad. Democracy is under pressure from protectionism, populism, nationalism, terrorism, and autocracy. Against this backdrop, the Alliance of Democracies foundation seeks to unite world democracies. According to Rasmussen, the new alliance of democracies would not be a new U.N. but rather an organisation that would supplement it.

The foundation runs three programs: the Copenhagen Democracy Summit, the Expeditionary Economics Program, and the Campaign for Democracy.

AoD and brand perception consultancy Latana produce an annual study, the Democracy Perception Index, on how people worldwide perceive democracy, published ahead of the Copenhagen Democracy Summit.

== History ==
In March 2021, AoD was one of several entities sanctioned by the Chinese government for "severely harm[ing] China's sovereignty and interests and maliciously spread lies and disinformation," subsequent to sanctions imposed by the European Union on Chinese government officials in Xinjiang for their role in what the EU Council called a "large-scale surveillance, detention, and indoctrination program targeting Muslim ethnic minorities."

== Leadership ==
AoD's board members include Anders Fogh Rasmussen, Fritz Schur, and Klaus Søgaard. Jonas Parello-Plesner serves as executive director.

== The Copenhagen Democracy Summit ==
The Copenhagen Democracy Summit is an international conference which is held annually in Copenhagen during the summer. The summit brings together political and business leaders, including current and former heads of government, from the world's democracies. In parallel, a similar conference takes place every winter in Denver, Colorado, United States. In light of a decline of liberal democracies across the world, the aim of the summit is to be a top international forum for analysis on the security and economic challenges facing the democratic world as well as a forum for analysis on the interplay between technology and democratic norms.

The first annual Copenhagen Democracy Summit took place in Copenhagen on July 22, 2018. Among those who attended were the then-Danish Prime Minister Lars Løkke Rasmussen, Joe Biden, Tony Blair, Stephen Harper, Felipe Calderón, José María Aznar, and Toomas Ilves. A total of 350 participants attended from over 40 countries. One of the publications released at the conference concluded that people's trust in government is lower in democracies than in non-democratic states.

The 2020 Copenhagen Democracy Summit included an intervention by then US Secretary of State Michael Pompeo, former US Secretaries of State John Kerry and Madeleine Albright and the President of Taiwan Tsai Ing-wen. In 2021, Zuzana Čaputová, President of Slovakia spoke arguing that democracy needs three basic lines of defence - independent institutions with responsible public officials, active civil society and free media. The 2022 Democracy Summit was closed by former United States President Barack Obama and addressed by Lithuania Prime Minister Ingrida Šimonytė, European Parliament President Roberta Metsola, and Ukraine President Volodymyr Zelenskyy. In 2023, speakers included the newly elected President of the Czech Republic Petr Pavel, Estonia Prime Minister Kaja Kallas, Ukraine President Volodymyr Zelenskyy, NATO Secretary General Jens Stoltenberg, former United Kingdom Prime Minister Liz Truss, and Belarus political activist Sviatlana Tsikhanouskaya.

The 2024 Copenhagen Democracy Summit took place between 14 and 15 May and included Prime minister of Armenia Nikol Pashinyan, President of Ghana Nana Akufo-Addo, President of Kosovo Vjosa Osmani, former United States Secretary of State Hillary Clinton, Prime Minister of Denmark Mette Frederiksen, President of the European Council Charles Michel, President of the European Commission Ursula von der Leyen, among others.

== The Expeditionary Economics Program ==
The Expeditionary Economics Program is rooted in Cold War efforts by the United States to strengthen post-war Europe and create a better economic model than the communist one offered by the Soviet Union. The program supports entrepreneurial projects in developing states, emerging democracies, and post-conflict areas for the purpose of strengthening democracy in fragile states by developing a local economic base.

== The Campaign for Democracy ==
The Campaign for Democracy seeks to connect supporters of democracy across the world and build an intellectual movement for democracy through a network of local associations, online presence, media engagement, and support for dissidents.

On the sidelines of the 2018 Copenhagen Democracy Summit Anders Fogh Rasmussen together with Michael Chertoff launched the Transatlantic Commission on Election Integrity, which has Joe Biden, Nick Clegg, Toomas Ilves, and Felipe Calderón among its members. The commission is tasked with bolstering the defences of Western democracies against outside interference.

== Democracy Perception Index ==
Working with the polling firm Dalia research or the brand research firm Latana, the Alliance has since 2018 published reports on how democracy is perceived in 50 countries around the world.

== Funding ==
In 2023, AoD stated it was principally "funded by private sponsors, governments and individuals." It credited 56 organisations and companies as current and former supporters. The list included Atlantic Council, George W. Bush Institute, European Endowment for Democracy, Freedom House, International Republican Institute, National Democratic Institute, Taiwan Foundation for Democracy and The Chicago Council on Global Affairs.
