= Christopher MacEvoy Sr. =

Danish planter

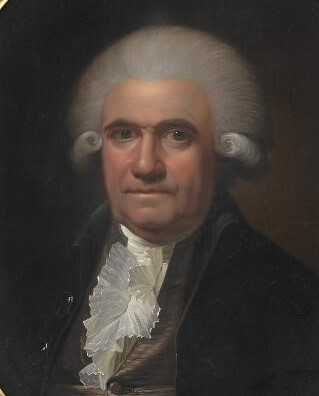
- Detail of portrait painting by Jens Juel, c. 1791.
- Born: C. 1719; Ireland
- Died: 1792; London, Great Britain
- Occupations: Planter, merchant

Christopher MacEvoy Sr. (c. 1719 - 1792) was an Irish-born planter, landowner and merchant on St. Croix in the Danish West Indies. One of the largest landowners on the island, he moved to Europe in 1776, sharing his time between Denmark and England. He owned the country house Christiansholm in Klampenborg north of Copenhagen from c. 1777 to 1783. He was the father of Christopher MacEvoy Jr.

== Biography ==
Older sources state that MacEvoy was originally from Scotland. More recent research indicates that he was of Irish origin. His wife was Mary Markoe (c. 1737-1776). One source states that MacEvoy settled on St. Croix in 1751 but his name is more frequently mentioned in contemporary documents from 1756 onwards.

His holdings on the islands included the Whim Sugar Plantation on Saint Croix. He left St. Croix for Copenhagen and was granted Danish citizenship in 1776. His wife died on 7 December that same year and was buried from Trinitatis Church.

MacEvoy purchased the country house Christiansholm in Klampenborg north of Copenhagen circa 1777.

Back on St. Croix, in 1778, he married Jenny Marie Low (-1812 ). She was a daughter of William and Margaretha Low of St. Christophe (now Saint Kitts) where her father was a physician.

In 1783, MacEvoy sold Christiansholm to count Ernst Heinrich von Schimmelmann. He moved to England where he spent the rest of his life on Wealside Farm, Northumberland. He died in July 1792.
